= M-102 (Michigan highway) =

State highway in Michigan, United States

M-102
- 8 Mile Road
- M-102 highlighted in red

Route information
- Maintained by MDOT
- Length: 20.804 mi (33.481 km)
- Existed: c. 1928–present

Major junctions
- West end: M-5 at Livonia
- US 24 at Southfield; M-39 / M-10 at Southfield; I-75 / M-1 at Detroit; M-53 / M-97 at Warren; M-3 at Eastpointe
- East end: I-94 at Harper Woods

Location
- Country: United States
- State: Michigan
- Counties: Wayne, Oakland, Macomb

Highway system
- Michigan State Trunkline Highway System; Interstate; US; State; Byways
← US 102	→ M-103

M-102 is an east–west state trunkline highway in the US state of Michigan that runs along the northern boundary of Detroit following 8 Mile Road. The highway follows the Michigan Baseline, a part of the land survey of the state, and the roadway is also called Base Line Road in places. As a county road or city street, 8 Mile Road extends both east and west of the M-102 designation, which leaves 8 Mile on the eastern end to follow Vernier Road. The western terminus of M-102 is at the junction of 8 Mile Road and M-5 (Grand River Avenue) and the opposite end is at Vernier Road and Interstate 94 (I-94). The 8 Mile Road name extends west to Pontiac Trail near South Lyon with a discontinuous segment located west of US Highway 23 (US 23). The eastern end of 8 Mile Road is in Grosse Pointe Woods, near I-94, with a short, discontinuous segment east of Mack Avenue.

The highway was first designated in the late 1920s, connecting US 10 (Woodward Avenue, now M-1) with US 25 (Gratiot Avenue, now M-3). Extensions to the highway designation moved the termini in the 1930s and 1940s east to M-29 (Jefferson Avenue) and US 16 (Grand River Avenue, now M-5). A change in the 1960s added a section of north–south roadway to the eastern end of M-102; that change was reversed within about a year. A western extension along Grand River Avenue in 1977 was reversed in 1994, and M-102 has remained the same since.

As the long northern border of the city of Detroit, 8 Mile Road has carried major cultural significance; since the mid-20th century parts of the road has served as a physical and cultural dividing line between the wealthier, predominantly white northern suburbs of Detroit and the poorer, predominantly black city. The racial patterns have changed somewhat as middle-class African Americans have also moved north of 8 Mile, but the socioeconomic divide between the city and suburbs remains.

== Route description ==
Starting at an intersection with Hamburg Road along the Livingston–Washtenaw county line, 8 Mile Road runs eastward to an interchange with US 23 near Whitmore Lake. There is a gap before 8 Mile Road resumes at Pontiac Trail along the Oakland–Washtenaw county line. Near the suburb of Northville, the road curves northward into Oakland County, and Base Line Road follows the county line for about one mile (1.6 km). The road meets I-96/I-275 at that freeway's exit 167 along the border between Livonia and Farmington Hills. As its name implies, 8 Mile Road runs east–west eight miles (13 km) north of the origin of the Mile Road System at Michigan and Woodward avenues.

M-102 starts at the intersection between M-5 (Grand River Avenue) and 8 Mile Road and runs eastward along 8 Mile Road. The highway widens out into a boulevard setup with each direction divided by a central median. Motorists that want to make a left turn along 8 Mile Road have to perform a Michigan left to do so. Starting at the Inkster Road intersection, M-102 forms the boundary between Redford to the south and Southfield to the north. East of Five Points Road, the 8 Mile follows the northern city limits of Detroit. On either side of 8 Mile Road, the area is filled with residential neighborhoods of the two cities with commercial businesses immediately adjacent to the highway. About two miles (3.2 km) east of its starting point, M-102 intersects US 24 (Telegraph Road) at a cloverleaf interchange near Frisbee-Pembroke Park and Plum Hollow Country Club. Along the length of the eight-lane highway, there are large power line towers in the median.

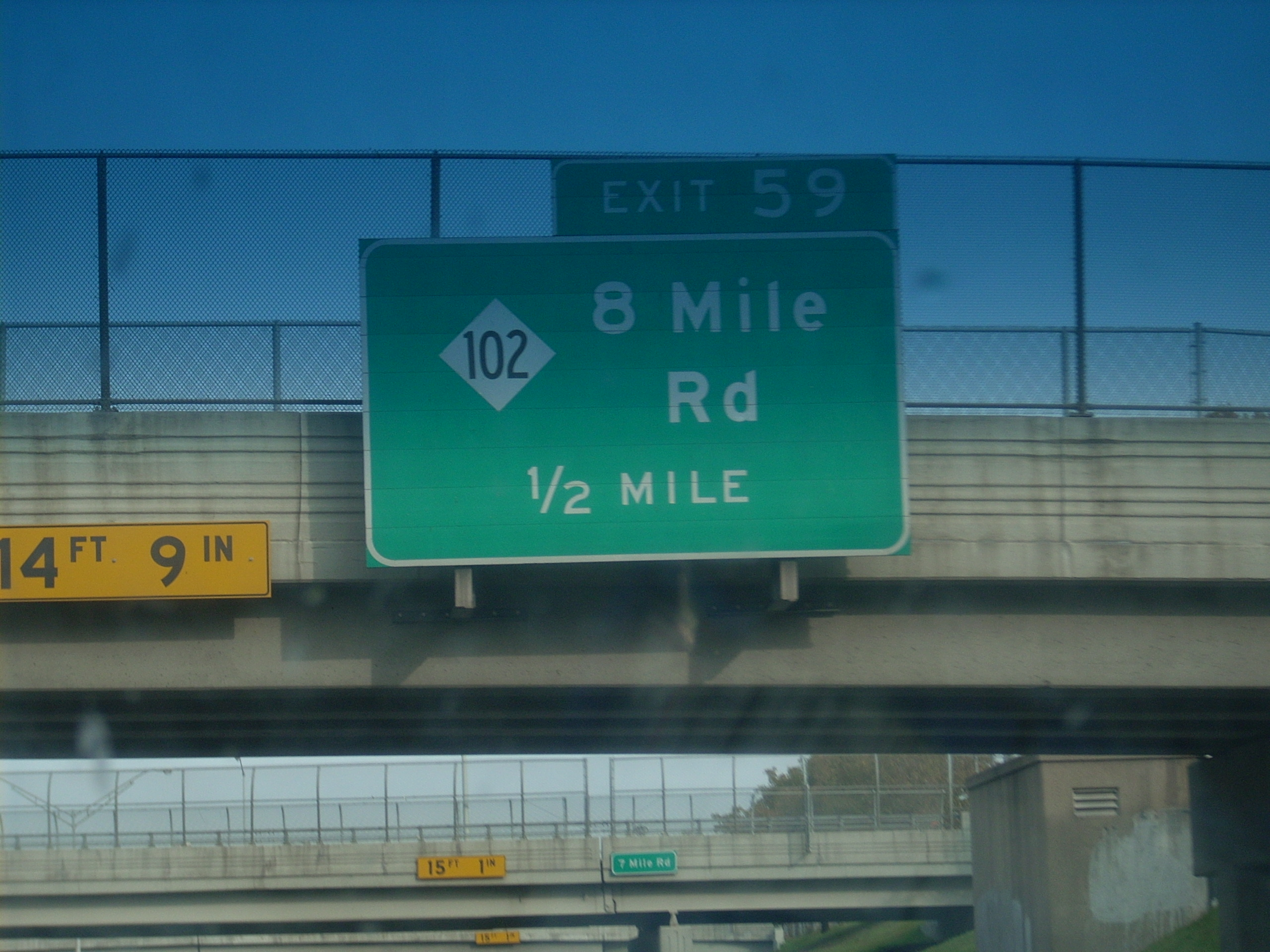
8 Mile Road exit sign on I-75, at 7 Mile Road in Detroit

Continuing east, M-102 intersects M-39 (Southfield Freeway) and M-10 (Lodge Freeway) south of the Southfield campus of Oakland Community College and the Northland Center Mall. As the highway approaches M-1 (Woodward Avenue), there are a pair of service drives that split from the main roadway in each direction to provide access through the interchange with M-1. The main lanes of M-102 pass under M-1 and its ramp connections before the service drives merge back in on the other side. This interchange is located adjacent to the Michigan State Fairgrounds, former site of the now-defunct Michigan State Fair, and Woodlawn Cemetery. East of the fairgrounds, the highway crosses a line of the Canadian National Railway that also carries Amtrak passenger traffic; the line is south of a rail terminal in Ferndale. Further east, M-102 meets I-75 before intersecting Dequindre Road. Dequindre is the boundary between Oakland and Macomb counties.

Now following the Wayne–Macomb county line, M-102 separates Warren from Detroit. The highway also runs parallel to, and about a half mile (0.8 km) north of Outer Drive, the original beltway highway proposed in 1918 to encircle Detroit. The road passes the Mound Road Engine facility, a former Chrysler plant next to the Mound Road intersection. East of the plant, the highway crosses a branch line of the Conrail Shared Assets Operations on the east side of the plant complex before intersecting M-53 (Van Dyke Road). Further east, 8 Mile Road passes north of the Bel Air Center Shopping Center before crossing another Canadian National Railway line next to the intersection with M-97 (Groesbeck Highway).

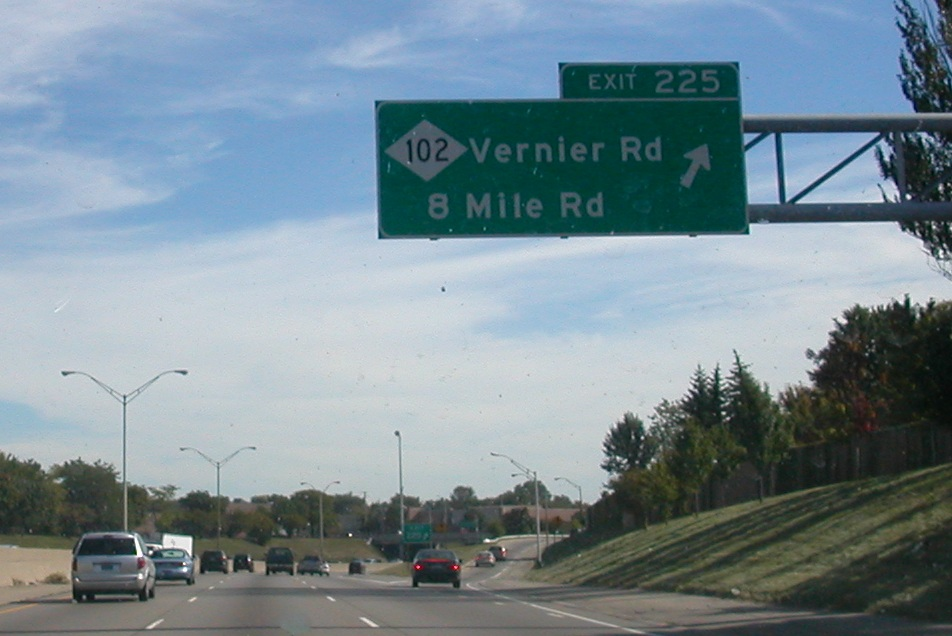
8 Mile Road exit off I-94

On the far east side of Detroit, M-102 separates the city from the suburb of Eastpointe once near the intersection with M-3 (Gratiot Avenue). Near Kelly Road and the Eastland Center, the highway turns southeasterly along Vernier Road to enter Harper Woods in Wayne County; 8 Mile Road continues due eastward along the county line in this suburb as a four-lane undivided urban arterial street. The eastern terminus of M-102 is at the interchange between Vernier Road and I-94 about 1,700 feet (520 m) south of 8 Mile Road near the boundary with Grosse Pointe Woods.

== History ==
M-102 was first designated along 8 Mile Road from US 10 (Woodward Avenue, now M-1) to US 25 (Gratiot Avenue, now M-3) in late 1928 or early 1929. In 1939, the eastern terminus was moved as M-102 was extended along 8 Mile and Vernier Roads to end in Grosse Pointe Shores at M-29 (Jefferson Avenue). The highway was extended in the early 1940s from Woodward westward to US 16 (Grand River Avenue, now M-5).

During 1963, the M-102 designation was extended northerly along Jefferson Avenue through St. Clair Shores, replacing the M-29 designation to the Shook Road interchange at the northern end of the then-existing I-94 freeway. That extension was reversed the next year, and M-102 was scaled back to end at US 25 (Gratiot Avenue); the rest of 8 Mile and Vernier roads plus the Jefferson Avenue segment are added to M-29 instead. M-102 was re-extended along 8 Mile and Vernier roads to the I-94 interchange in Harper Woods in 1970 replacing M-29; the remainder of that other highway along Vernier Road and Jefferson Avenue to Shook Road that was once part of M-102 was transferred to local control.

When I-96 was completed in 1977, several highway designations were shifted in the Metro Detroit area. The Business Spur I-96 designation that had replaced US 16 was removed from Grand River Avenue. That roadway was signed as M-5 southward between 8 Mile Road and its present eastern terminus at I-96 while the remainder of Grand River Avenue and the stub freeway formerly part of I-96 that continued out to I-275 became part of M-102. This extension to M-102 was reversed in October 1994 when M-5 was extended northwesterly along Grand River Avenue, the freeway and up the Haggerty Connector north of I-96 in Novi, replacing part of M-102 in the process.

== Cultural impact ==
=== Racial and economic divide ===
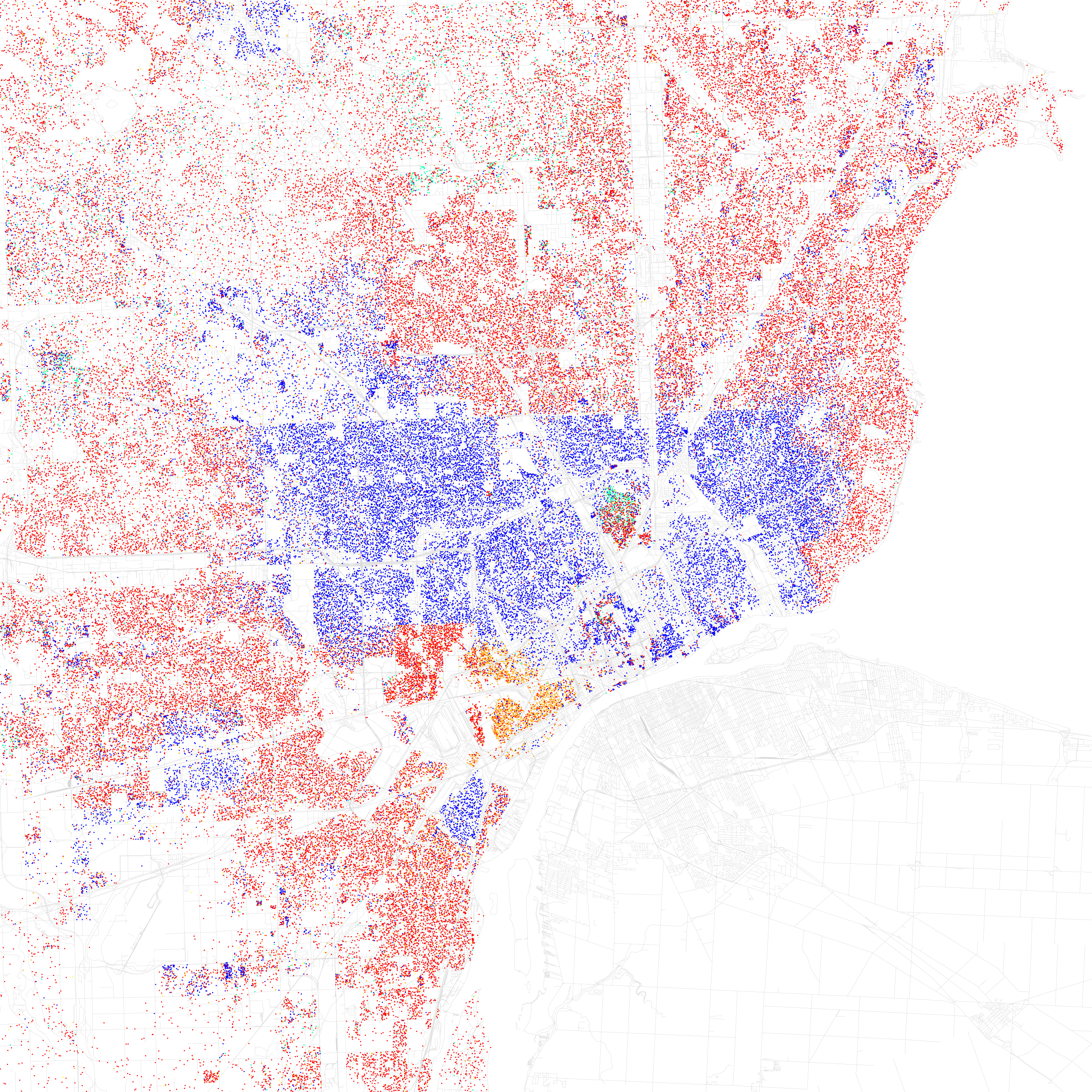
Racial distribution of Metro Detroit from the 2010 census White Black Asian Hispanic Other (Each dot represents 25 people)

The road has long served as a de facto cultural dividing line between the predominantly black and poorer city and its wealthier, predominantly white northern suburbs. The perception of 8 Mile as the chief dividing line between racial groups and socioeconomic classes persists, in part because the suburban counties of Oakland and Macomb remain, on the whole, significantly whiter and more prosperous than the city of Detroit. However, in recent years increasing numbers of whites have moved into Detroit, especially around the downtown area, while other neighborhoods throughout the region have become more ethnically diverse.

According to the 2000 United States census, the median family income in Detroit, whose population was 81.55% black, was $33,853, and 26.1% of the population lived below the poverty line. By contrast, Oakland County, whose population was 82.75% white, had a median family income of $75,540, and 5.5% of residents lived below the poverty line. Researchers from Brown University and Florida State University calculated an Index of Dissimilarity of 85.9 using the 2000 Census, the highest score among metropolitan areas in the United States. Using data from the 2010 Census, the index declined to 79.6, which the study's authors described as a "substantial decline".

The film 8 Mile, starring Detroit-area hip-hop artist Eminem, who lived near 8 Mile Road as a child, and his songs "Lose Yourself" and "8 Mile" draw on the roadway's name and cultural significance.

=== Surveying ===
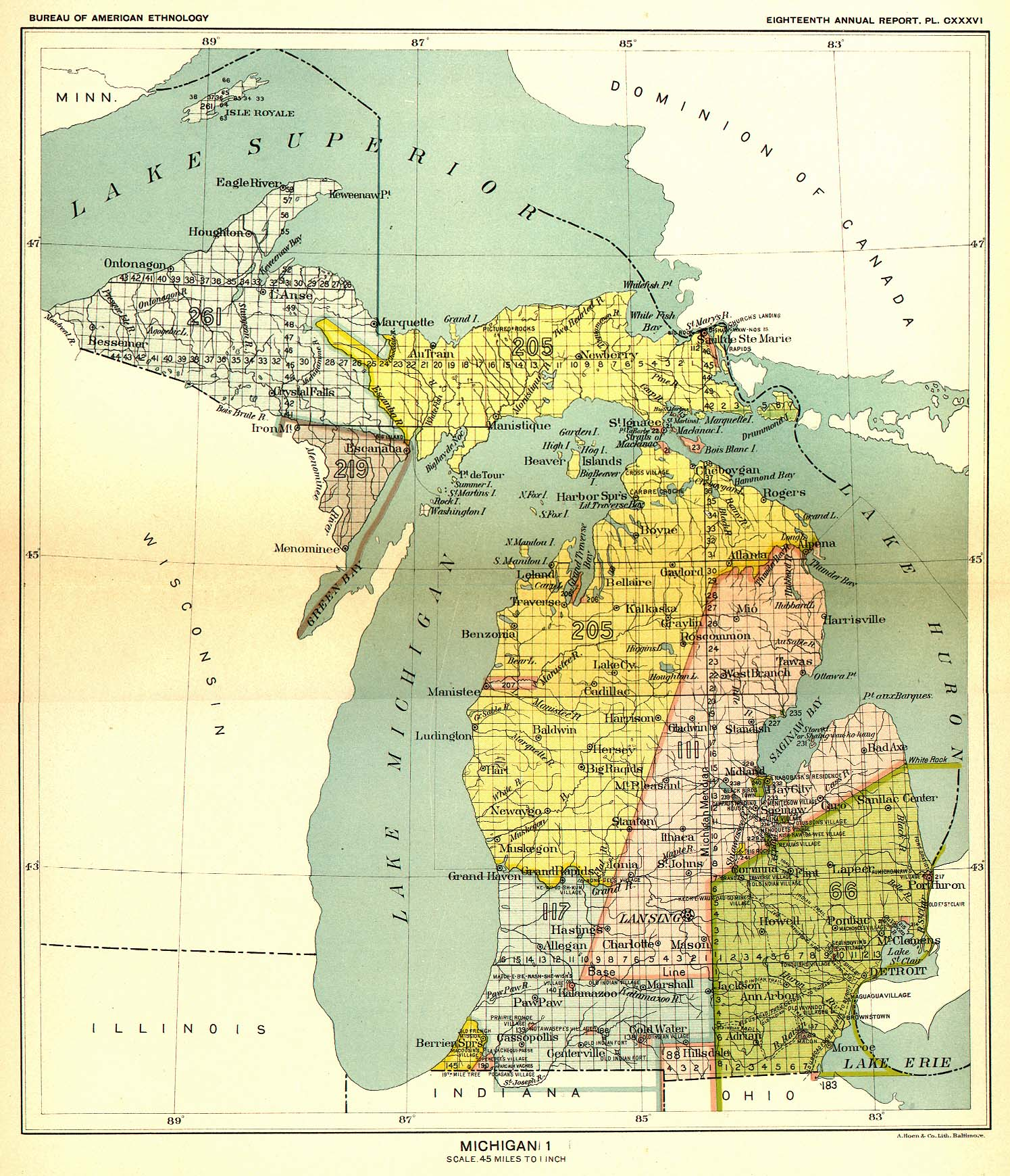
Map of Michigan showing the Michigan Baseline used for survey purposes

8 Mile Road is also known as Base Line Road because it was used as the baseline for Michigan's Public Land Survey System. The system helped establish orderly county boundaries, whereas boundaries in many other states were based on natural features such as rivers, hills, and trees and were therefore often irregular. Today, the baseline forms the northern or southern boundary of many counties in southern Michigan.

== Major intersections ==
County	Location	mi	km	Destinations	Notes
Oakland–Wayne county line	Farmington Hills–Livonia city line	0.000	0.000	M-5 (Grand River Avenue) to I-96 – Lansing; 8 Mile Road west	8 Mile Road extends westward to Pontiac Trail
Oakland–Wayne county line	Southfield–Detroit city line	2.187	3.520	US 24 (Telegraph Road) – Pontiac, Detroit	Diverging diamond interchange
Oakland–Wayne county line	Southfield–Detroit city line	5.198	8.365	M-39 (Southfield Freeway) – Southfield, Detroit	Exit 15 on M-39
Oakland–Wayne county line	Southfield–Detroit city line	6.015	9.680	M-10 (Lodge Freeway) / Greenfield Road – Lansing, Detroit	Exit 13 on M-10; no control cities eastbound; grade separation at Greenfield Road with access via M-10 ramps
Oakland–Wayne county line	Ferndale–Detroit city line	10.059	16.188	M-1 (Woodward Avenue) – Pontiac, Detroit	Three-level diamond interchange
Oakland–Wayne county line	Hazel Park–Detroit city line	11.577	18.631	I-75 (Chrysler Freeway) – Flint, Detroit	Exit 59 on I-75
Macomb–Wayne county line	Warren–Detroit city line	15.159	24.396	M-53 (Van Dyke Road) – Warren, Detroit	
Macomb–Wayne county line	Warren–Detroit city line	16.290	26.216	M-97 (Groesbeck Highway) – Mount Clemens, Detroit	
Macomb–Wayne county line	Eastpointe–Detroit city line	18.096	29.123	M-3 (Gratiot Avenue) – Mount Clemens, Detroit	
Macomb–Wayne county line	Eastpointe–Harper Woods city line	19.731	31.754	8 Mile Road east	M-102 follows Vernier Road; 8 Mile continues east to Mack Avenue
Wayne	Harper Woods	20.804	33.481	I-94 – Port Huron, Detroit; Vernier Road east	Exit 225 on I-94; Vernier Road continues east to Lake Shore Drive
1.000 mi = 1.609 km; 1.000 km = 0.621 mi
