= Outer Drive =

Bypass road

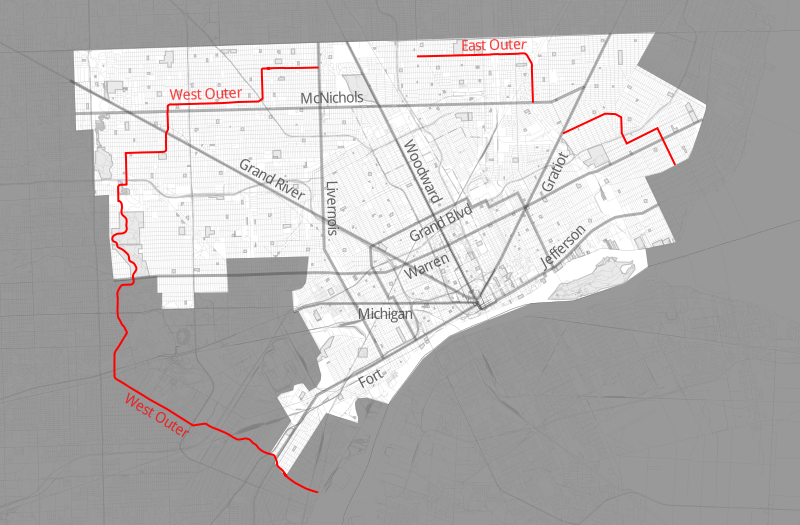
- Outer Drive highlighted in red
- Length: 40 mi (64 km)
- South end: Jefferson Avenue in Ecorse
- Major junctions: M-85 in Lincoln Park / Detroit I-75 in Lincoln Park / Detroit; I-94 in Allen Park; M-39 in Allen Park / Dearborn; US 12 in Dearborn; M-153 in Dearborn; I-96 in Detroit; M-3 / M-5 / M-10 / M-39 in Detroit I-94 in Detroit
- Eastern end: Mack Avenue – border of Detroit and Grosse Pointe Park

Outer Drive is a bypass road which encircles both the eastern and western portions of the Detroit, Michigan region. It resembles a jagged horseshoe and was not originally intended to move traffic as much as it was to provide a pleasurable drive around the City of Detroit and some of its suburbs.

A boulevard for the vast majority of its length, Outer Drive includes travel through beautiful subdivisions, school sites, and park areas. First proposed in 1918, it immediately won acceptance and eventually evolved into the thoroughfare which exists today. A 1929 article in Michigan Women magazine, predicted a "...great pleasure boulevard..." that would be "...like a necklace around Detroit...." However, in an article dated August 4, 2004, in the Metro Times, Michigan author Curt Guyette described Outer Drive as "...one of the oddest city thoroughfares in the country." Outer Drive was once famous for the elm trees that lined the wandering roadway at one time, but in a circa-1983 WXYZ-TV report about Outer Drive, reporter Erik Smith of the local ABC affiliate, declared that "...now, it may be more famous for its potholes."

While mostly within the Detroit city limits, Outer Drive also ventures into the cities of Allen Park, Dearborn, Dearborn Heights, Ecorse, Lincoln Park, and Melvindale.

At its western starting point at Jefferson Avenue in Ecorse near the Detroit River, the thoroughfare meanders northwesterly to Michigan Avenue, where it makes a northeast bend along the River Rouge; it then continues northeasterly with several 90-degree-angle turns until Outer Drive ends at Livernois Avenue. Outer Drive then resumes on Detroit's east side, over-taking State Fair Avenue, Conner Avenue, Alter Road, Chandler Park Drive, and Whittier Avenue, with its eastern terminus at Mack Avenue at the northern edge of the City of Grosse Pointe Park, but not actually entering that city. Outer Drive is notable for having several isolated divided portions. There are three such segments. The largest is the westernmost section, beginning at Jefferson Avenue in Ecorse and ending at Livernois Avenue in Detroit—this particular sector is 23.6 miles (38.0 km). The middle section is between Dequindre Road (at East State Fair Avenue) and at East McNichols Road (between the Mount Olivet Cemetery and the Coleman A. Young International Airport); that section is 4.9 miles (7.9 km) entirely within Detroit. The easternmost section is between Conner Avenue (near Gratiot Avenue) and Mack Avenue; this portion is 5.3 miles (8.5 km) and likewise completely inside Detroit.

== See also ==
- Grand Boulevard (Detroit)
