= M-39 (Michigan highway) =

State highway in Michigan, United States

M-39
- Southfield Road, Southfield Freeway
- M-39 highlighted in red

Route information
- Maintained by MDOT
- Length: 17.006 mi (27.369 km)
- Existed: c. 1959–present

Major junctions
- South end: Lafayette Boulevard in Lincoln Park
- I-75 in Lincoln Park; I-94 in Allen Park; US 12 in Dearborn; I-96 in Detroit; M-102 on the Detroit–Southfield border
- North end: M-10 in Southfield

Location
- Country: United States
- State: Michigan
- Counties: Wayne, Oakland

Highway system
- Michigan State Trunkline Highway System; Interstate; US; State; Byways
← M-38	→ M-40

M-39 is a 16-mile-long (26 km) north–south state trunkline highway in Metro Detroit area of the US state of Michigan that runs from Lincoln Park, on the south end, to Southfield on the north. The official southern terminus of M-39 is at the corner of Southfield Road and Lafayette Boulevard in Lincoln Park, one block southeast of the junction of Interstate 75 (I-75, Fisher Freeway) and two blocks northwest of M-85 (Fort Street). From there the highway heads northward. The first 2.3 miles (3.7 km) of the highway follows Southfield Road, a divided highway in the Downriver area. It then transitions into the Southfield Freeway, which is a 13.7-mile-long (22.0 km) freeway that runs from I-94 in Allen Park north through Dearborn, and then the west side of Detroit, to Southfield. The northern terminus is at M-10 (Lodge Freeway) in Southfield.

The current M-39 is the third highway to bear the designation. The first dated back to the origins of the state highway system in 1919 and ran between Grand Rapids and Lansing. This highway was replaced in segments through the 1920s and 1930s by realignments or extensions of other highways in the area. The second was part of Schaefer Highway in the Detroit area from 1939 until the end of the 1950s. The current highway was commissioned when the M-39 designation was moved to Southfield Road from Schaefer Highway. During the 1960s, it was converted into a freeway in stages. Afterwards, it was extended to end at M-85 (Fort Street) before a change in the 1980s gave the trunkline its present termini.

== Route description ==
M-39 begins at Lafayette Boulevard a block east of its junction with I-75 in Lincoln Park along Southfield Road, which continues east-southeasterly past the start of the M-39 designation under local maintenance. From there the road is a six-lane boulevard through residential areas as it runs west-northwesterly to pass under I-75 and an adjacent Conrail Shared Assets Operations rail line. In Allen Park, the highway continues through residential and commercial areas. Southfield Road crosses lines of the Canadian National Railway and Norfolk Southern Railway near the location where the highway turns to the northeast and transitions into a six-lane limited-access freeway. Immediately after this transition, the Southfield Freeway, as M-39 is now called, has an interchange with I-94. There is a second, adjacent interchange that connects to Van Born Road, and the freeway winds its way northeasterly through Dearborn. The freeway is bordered by service drives that carry one-way traffic and bear the Southfield Road name on either side. M-39 meets Outer Drive next to the Fairlane Green power center. The adjoining properties are residential to the west and commercial to the east. Near Greenfield Village, the freeway curves to the northwest around the Ford Proving Grounds before turning to the north, a direction it will maintain until the end of its run. The freeway crosses the River Rouge, passes under the line used by the Amtrak Wolverine, and meets US Highway 12 (US 12, Michigan Avenue) next to the Fairlane Town Center and Ford Motor Company's former world headquarters in Dearborn (the Henry Ford II World Center, also known as the Glass House) near the campus of the University of Michigan–Dearborn.

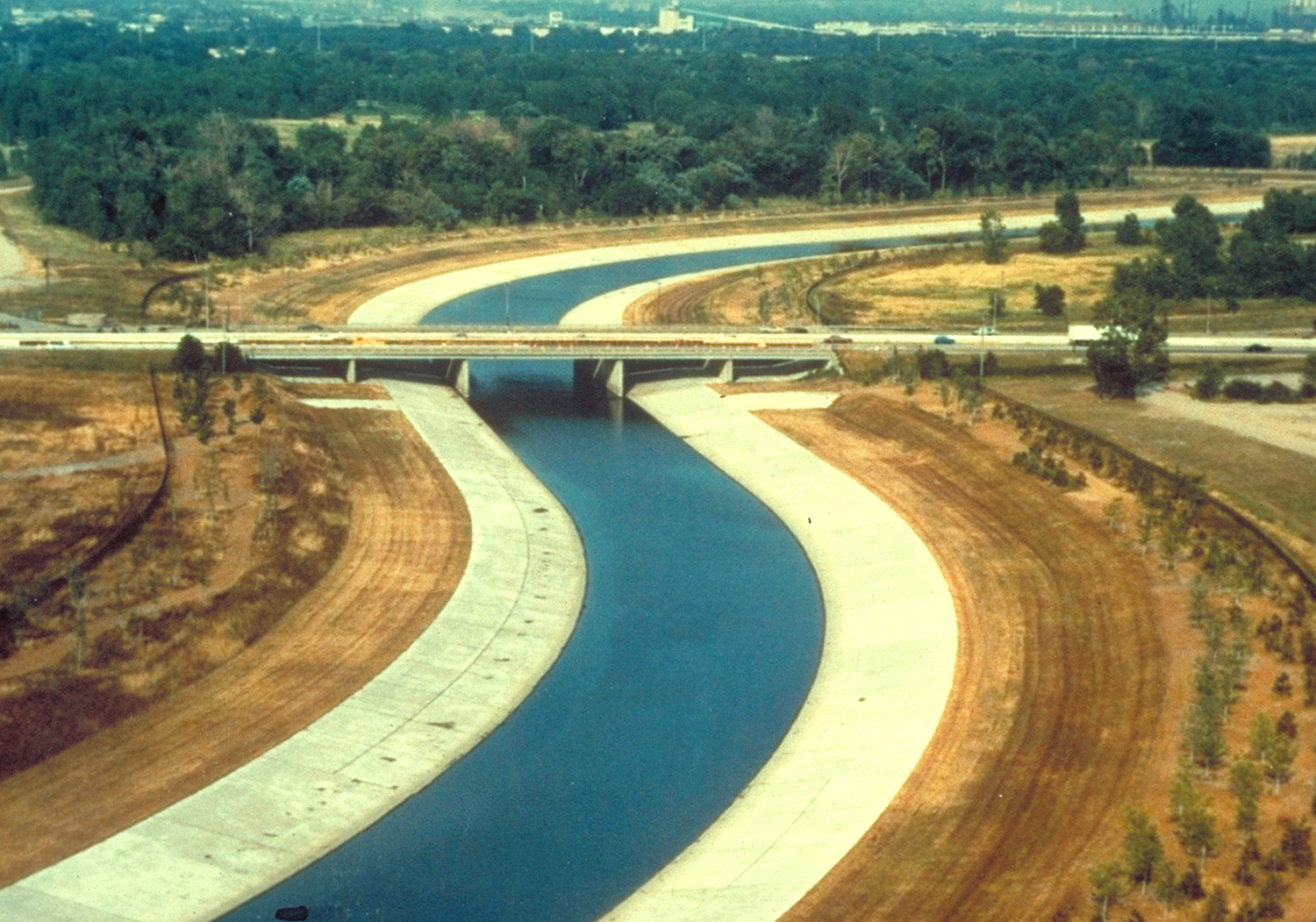
M-39 bridge over the River Rouge in Dearborn

North of the interchange for M-153, (Ford Road), M-39 crosses into Detroit. From there the road continues through the densely populated areas of the west side of the city. Next to the Chicago Road overpass, the freeway runs under a CSX Transportation rail line. The trunkline continues traveling to the north through a series of interchanges. The first is a partial interchange for Plymouth Road; northbound traffic exiting here is directed to use the service drive northbound to access Schoolcraft Road, and traffic can enter M-39 southbound. Next is the stack interchange with I-96 (Jeffries Freeway) with access to both the local and express lanes of that freeway. The last of the series is another partial interchange with Schoolcraft Road. As a counterpart to the Plymouth Road interchange, this one provides access from southbound M-39 to the cross street with a signed connection along the southbound service drive to Plymouth Road and an entry point for northbound traffic. Continuing north, M-39 comes to an interchange with M-5 (Grand River Avenue) which also connects to Fenkell Avenue, the 5 Mile Road equivalent on Detroit's mile road system.

There are three more interchanges along M-39 in Detroit as the freeway continues through the residential upper west side. Near the Wayne Community College District, the freeway meets McNichols Road (6 Mile). There is another interchange approximately one mile (1.6 km) north at 7 Mile Road as well. The road then crosses the border between Wayne and Oakland counties to enter Southfield at the interchange with M-102 (8 Mile Road). The Southfield Freeway, and M-39, terminates at an interchange with M-10 (John C. Lodge Freeway) near 9 Mile Road. Southfield Road continues northward from the end of the freeway under local maintenance.

M-39 is maintained by the Michigan Department of Transportation (MDOT) like other state highways in Michigan. As a part of these maintenance responsibilities, the department tracks the volume of traffic that uses the roadways under its jurisdiction. These volumes are expressed using a metric called annual average daily traffic, which is a statistical calculation of the average daily number of vehicles on a segment of roadway. MDOT's surveys in 2010 showed that the highest traffic levels along M-39 were the 159,400 vehicles daily between Schoolcraft Road and Grand River Avenue in Detroit; the lowest counts were the 20,400 vehicles per day between the I-94 and Van Born Road interchanges. All of M-39, and Southfield Road on either end that is not under state maintenance, has been listed on the National Highway System, a network of roads important to the country's economy, defense, and mobility.

== History ==
=== Previous designations ===
Two previous highways bore the M-39 designation. When the state highway system was first signed in 1919, the number was assigned to a highway that ran between Grand Rapids and Lansing. The westernmost end in Kent County near Alto was replaced by a realigned M-16. Within the next few years, the western end was scaled back further to the Woodbury area when M-50 was extended, with the remainder replaced by an extended M-43 around 1938.

The next trunkline to be designated M-39 was Schaefer Highway in 1939, running north–south from US 25/M-17 (at the five-way intersection of Schaefer, Oakwood Boulevard, and Francis Street) in Melvindale to US 16 (Grand River Avenue) in western Detroit. Since M-39 was moved to Southfield Road in the end of the 1950s, Schaefer Highway has been a locally maintained road.

=== Current designation ===
M-39 was reassigned to Southfield Road, which parallels Schaefer Highway two miles (3.2 km) to the west, connecting I-94 with Northwestern Highway in 1958-59. By 1961, the freeway was marked as under construction on maps. The first section opened in December 1961 was 2.7 miles (4.3 km) from Ford Road north to Chicago Road. The remainder of the freeway between I-94 and the Lodge Freeway and 9 Mile Road was opened by the middle of 1964 at a total cost of $40 million. The highway designation was extended southeasterly along Southfield Road to the new I-75 freeway and a terminus at M-85 (Fort Street) in 1966. In 1987, the M-39 designation was truncated slightly so that the trunkline no longer officially connects to M-85.

== Exit list ==
County	Location	mi	km	Exit	Destinations	Notes
Wayne	Lincoln Park	0.000	0.000		Lafayette Boulevard; Southfield Road south	Roadway continues southeast as Southfield Road
Wayne	Lincoln Park	0.172– 0.186	0.277– 0.299		I-75 – Detroit, Toledo	Exit 41 on I-75
Wayne	Allen Park	2.169	3.491	Southern end of freeway		
Wayne	Allen Park	2.423– 2.444	3.899– 3.933	1	I-94 – Detroit, Chicago	Exit 204 on I-94
Wayne	Dearborn Heights	2.593– 2.600	4.173– 4.184	2	Van Born Road	Northbound exit and southbound entrance; northbound exit ramp attached to exit 1; southbound exit and northbound entrance are at exit 3
Wayne	Dearborn	3.254– 3.269	5.237– 5.261	3	Outer Drive	Signed as Outer Drive and Van Born Road southbound
Wayne	Dearborn	4.258	6.853	4	Oakwood Boulevard	
Wayne	Dearborn	4.901	7.887	5	Rotunda Drive	Additional northbound entrance at exit 6
Wayne	Dearborn	5.885– 5.904	9.471– 9.502	6	US 12 (Michigan Avenue)	Access to U of M-Dearborn, Henry Ford CC, and Fairlane Town Center; northbound access to Hubbard Drive
Wayne	Dearborn	7.141– 7.152	11.492– 11.510	7	M-153 (Ford Road)	Access to Fairlane Town Center; southbound access to Hubbard Drive
Wayne	Detroit	8.138	13.097	8	Warren Avenue	
Wayne	Detroit	9.137	14.705	9	Joy Road	
Wayne	Detroit	10.131	16.304	10	Plymouth Road, Schoolcraft Avenue	Northbound exit and southbound entrance; connection to Schoolcraft Avenue by way of the service drive
Wayne	Detroit	10.556– 10.629	16.988– 17.106	11A	I-96 (Jeffries Freeway) – Lansing, Downtown Detroit	Exit 183 on I-96
Wayne	Detroit	11.130	17.912	11B	Schoolcraft Avenue, Plymouth Road	Southbound exit and northbound entrance; connection to Plymouth Road by way of the service drive
Wayne	Detroit	12.094	19.463	12	M-5 (Grand River Avenue) / Fenkell Avenue	
Wayne	Detroit	13.122	21.118	13	McNichols Road	
Wayne	Detroit	14.744	23.728	14	7 Mile Road	
Wayne–Oakland county line	Detroit–Southfield city line	15.721– 15.745	25.300– 25.339	15	M-102 (8 Mile Road)	
Oakland	Southfield	16.631– 17.006	26.765– 27.369	16	M-10 north (Lodge Freeway) to I-696 west – Lansing; Southfield Road north	Directional access from M-39 to M-10 (northbound to northbound and southbound to southbound only); exit 14C on M-10; roadway continues north as Southfield Road
1.000 mi = 1.609 km; 1.000 km = 0.621 mi: Incomplete access
