= M-5 (Michigan highway) =

State highway in Michigan, United States

M-5
- M-5 highlighted in red

Route information
- Maintained by MDOT
- Length: 27.890 mi (44.885 km)
- Existed: 1977–present

Major junctions
- North end: Pontiac Trail in Commerce Township
- I-96 / I-275 / I-696 in Novi; M-102 in Livonia-Farmington Hills; US 24 in Detroit; M-39 / M-10 in Detroit; I-96 / I-94 / I-75 in Detroit
- East end: Cass Avenue and Middle Street in Detroit

Location
- Country: United States
- State: Michigan
- Counties: Oakland, Wayne

Highway system
- Michigan State Trunkline Highway System; Interstate; US; State; Byways
← M-4	→ M-6

M-5, commonly referred to as Grand River Avenue and the northern section as the Haggerty Connector, is a 27.9-mile-long (44.9 km) state trunkline highway in the Metro Detroit area of the US state of Michigan. The highway runs through suburbs in Oakland and Wayne counties in addition to part of Detroit itself. It starts in Commerce Township as a north–south divided highway and freeway called the Haggerty Connector and connects with Interstate 96 (I-96) in Novi. The freeway then turns southeasterly to bypass the suburb of Farmington as an east–west highway. The freeway ends on the southeast side of Farmington, and M-5 follows Grand River Avenue as a boulevard into Detroit. The eastern terminus is at the five-way intersection between Grand River Avenue, Cass Avenue, and Middle Street in Downtown Detroit, where it had been extended to in May 2016 from an interchange with I-96 on the northwest side of the city. The trunkline passes between suburban residential subdivisions and along urban commercial areas while serving 17,200–68,800 vehicles on average each day.

Grand River Avenue started as the path of an early wagon trail in the Michigan Territory, carrying settlers from Detroit inland along a route previously used by Native Americans. It was later a plank road that helped to connect Detroit with the state capital of Lansing and Grand Rapids. When the state highway system was signed in 1919, the avenue was numbered as part of M-16. Later it became US Highway 16 (US 16). Grand River Avenue was supposed to be the path for I-96 from Novi into downtown Detroit, and a section of freeway now used by M-5 was constructed as part of I-96 before the Interstate was rerouted to a different location. In the 1990s another section of freeway, which was originally proposed for a northern extension of I-275, was opened. This freeway called the Haggerty Connector was added to M-5. Additional projects have extended the highway farther north and added a roundabout to the northern terminus. A different highway was previously designated M-5 in another area of the state in the 1930s.

== Route description ==
M-5 starts at a roundabout intersection with Pontiac Trail in Commerce Township. It runs south-southwesterly from here in Oakland County as a divided highway between suburban residential subdivisions in the township. South of Maple Road, the highway is bordered by commercial developments to the east and Long Park to the west as it angles southeasterly. Between 14 and 13 Mile roads, the highway is once again bounded by subdivisions. Along this part of the trunkline, access to the road is limited to major intersections only, making the highway an expressway. Immediately south of the 13 Mile Road intersection, M-5's median widens out as the highway transitions to a full freeway called the Haggerty Connector. Traffic can only access the highway at grade-separated interchanges instead of at-grade intersections. A collector-distributor lane setup parallels the main freeway lanes providing access to the ramps at the 12 Mile Road interchange as well as ramps from the massive interchange with I-96, I-275 and I-696. Through this interchange complex that straddles the Novi–Farmington Hills city line, M-5 turns to the southeast, and signage changes direction. The Haggerty Connector is signed north–south, while the rest of M-5 is signed east–west. M-5 has direct connections with ramps to I-696 and I-96 east/I-275 south as it crosses over into Farmington Hills.

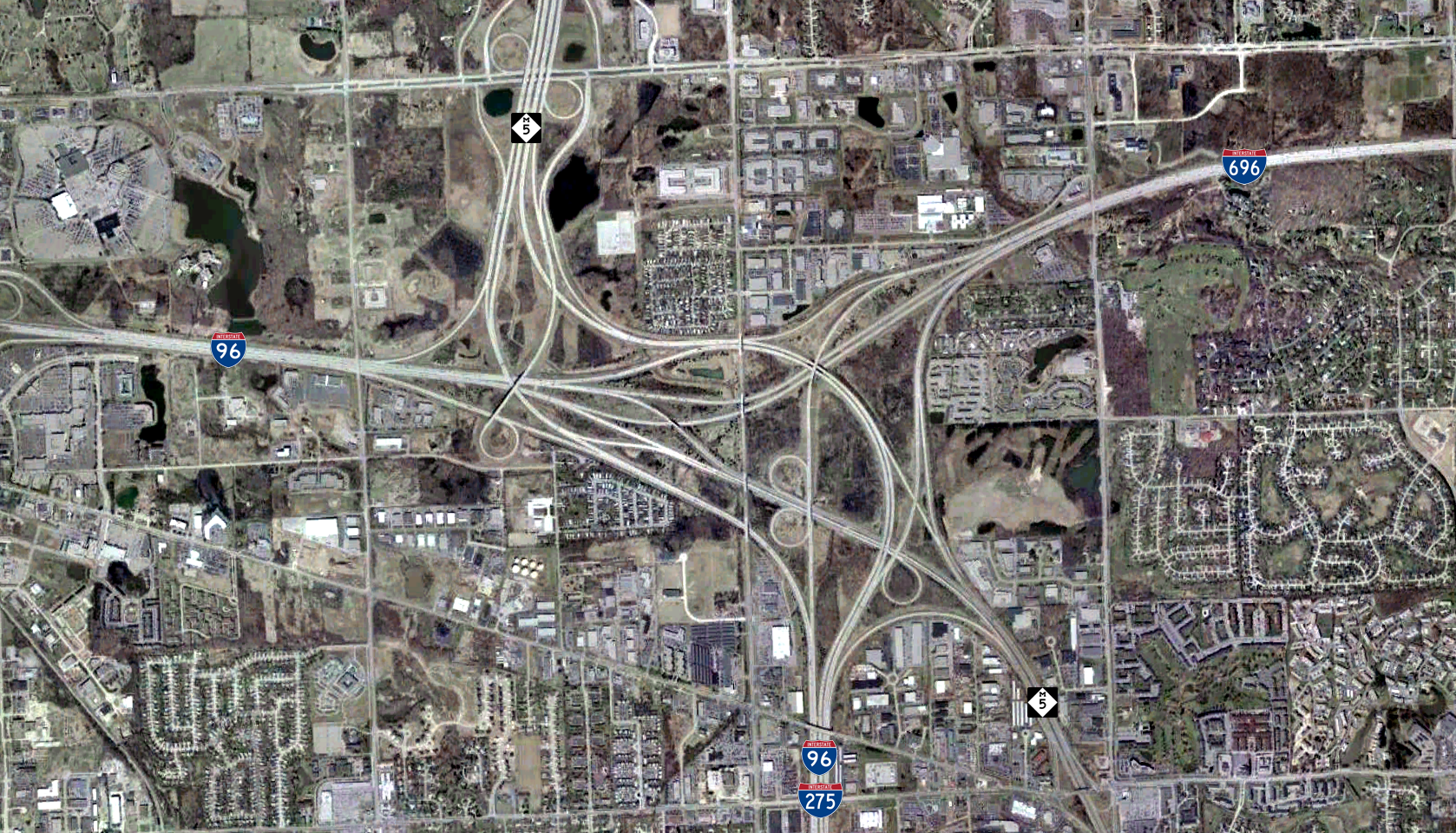
Satellite view of the interchange between I-96, I-275, I-696 and M-5; M-5 enters from the north (top) and exits to the southeast (lower right).

The next interchange for the M-5 freeway connects to Grand River Avenue and 10 Mile Road. This section of the freeway bypasses residential areas of Farmington Hills. Further east, M-5 crosses into Farmington where it bypasses the downtown area of the suburb. Past 9 Mile Road, the freeway ends at the intersection with Grand River Avenue, and M-5 follows Grand River southeasterly as a boulevard, a type of divided street. Traffic that wishes to make left turns must use a Michigan left maneuver along this section of the highway. Additionally, traffic that needs to change sides of the street must use crossovers in the median to perform a U-turn. Once again running through suburban Farmington Hills, the trunkline passes Botsford Hospital before intersecting 8 Mile Road. This intersection marks the place where M-5 crosses into Wayne County, and the western terminus of the M-102 designation on 8 Mile Road. Grand River Avenue runs through the northern section of Redford Township in Wayne County and crosses into Detroit at the intersection with 7 Mile Road and 5 Points Street.

The northwest corner of Detroit is mostly residential as M-5 intersects US 24 (Telegraph Road). Past Telegraph, Grand River Avenue forms the northern boundary of the Grand Lawn Cemetery and later the southern boundary of the New Rogell Golf Course. The properties bordering M-5 transition to commercial use past these two green spaces, and the highway continues southeasterly through the city as an undivided street. Grand River Avenue intersects Outer Drive near several businesses. M-5 crosses over M-39 (Southfield Freeway) near the intersection with Fenkell Street, which would be 5 Mile Road in the Detroit grid system. The residential areas off the adjacent side streets increase in density east of the Southfield Freeway. Although a few sources still indicate M-5 ending at the interchange with I-96 between Schoolcraft and Plymouth roads in the middle of another larger commercial zone; M-5 continues past this location along a portion of Grand River Avenue that until April–May 2016 was part of unsigned highway Old BS I-96. About a mile and three-quarters (2.8 km) along, M-5 crosses I-96 again near Livernois Avenue, and I-96 from here into the downtown area parallels Grand River Avenue. It passes Bishop Park near Grand Boulevard and then crosses I-94. In the North Corktown neighborhood, Grand River Avenue crosses M-10 (Lodge Freeway) near the MotorCity Casino. About a half mile (0.7 km) past M-10, M-5 crosses I-75 (Fisher Freeway) and enters Downtown Detroit's Foxtown neighborhood. State maintenance ends at the five-way intersection between Grand River Avenue, Cass Avenue, and Middle Street. Grand River Avenue continues another five blocks to Woodward Avenue and another four blocks as it curves in an arc around Grand Circus Park.

M-5 is maintained by the Michigan Department of Transportation (MDOT) like other state highways in Michigan. As a part of these maintenance responsibilities, the department tracks the volume of traffic that uses the roadways under its jurisdiction. These volumes are expressed using a metric called annual average daily traffic, which is a statistical calculation of the average daily number of vehicles on a segment of roadway. MDOT's surveys in 2010 showed that the highest traffic levels along M-5 were the 68,793 vehicles daily between 12 and 13 Mile roads; the lowest counts were the 17,176 vehicles per day southeast of Schoolcraft Road to I-96. All of M-5 has been listed on the National Highway System, a network of roads important to the country's economy, defense, and mobility. The trunkline is six- or eight-lanes wide along the freeway section to the north and west of the Grand River Avenue interchange; south and east of there it is a four-lane freeway or five- or six-lane wide highway all the way to Cass Avenue.

== History ==
=== Previous designation ===
Starting in 1933, M-5 was used as the designation along a section of highway that was previously part of US 2 in Mackinac and Chippewa counties in the Upper Peninsula. This designation was in use until 1939 when it was replaced by M-129.

=== Current designation ===
==== Grand River Avenue ====
Grand River Avenue was previously M-16 and US 16 in the early 20th century.

The chief transportation routes in 1701 were the Indian trails that crossed the future state of Michigan; the Grand River Trail was one of these thirteen trails at the time. Detroit created 120-foot (37 m) rights-of-way for the principal streets of the city, Grand River Avenue included, in 1805. This street plan was devised by Augustus Woodward and others following a devastating fire in Detroit. A ten-year project to construct a plank road between Detroit and Howell was authorized in 1820 along the Grand River Trail. Grand River Avenue was included as one of Five Great Military Roads in 1825, along with the River Road, Michigan Avenue, Woodward Avenue and Gratiot Avenue. The Grand River Road, precursor to the modern Grand River Avenue was named by Benjamin Williams, cofounder of Owosso; it was named for La Grande Riviere, the French name for the river.

The opening of the Erie Canal in New York in 1826 brought new settlers to the Great Lakes region, and to the future state of Michigan. Many of these settlers began their inland journeys in Detroit. At first the Grand River Road was a "deep rutted, ditch bordered road". The Grand River Road was a major route for settlers headed inland to Grand Rapids in 1836, as the shortest route for travelers coming from Detroit.

In 1850, the Michigan State Legislature established the Lansing and Howell Plank Road Company, which set about converting various Indian trails into the Lansing–Howell Plank Road, a task the company completed by 1853. At Howell the road connected with the Detroit–Howell Plank Road, establishing the first improved connection direct from the state capital to Michigan's largest metropolis. The Lansing–Detroit Plank Road was a toll road until the 1880s. It eventually evolved into the eastern part of the modern Grand River Avenue.

By 1900, only a short stretch of the Detroit–Howell Plank Road was still made of planks; most of the other plank roads had been converted to gravel by this time. When the Michigan State Highway Department (MSHD) had numbered and signed highways in the state in 1919, it applied the M-16 number to Grand River Avenue across the state between Grand Haven and Detroit.

The M-16 designation lasted for seven years. As the states were meeting with the American Association of State Highway Officials (AASHO, now AASHTO) to plan the United States Numbered Highway System, the route of M-16 was originally planned to be included in US 18. When the system was announced on November 11, 1926, Grand River Avenue and M-16 became part of US 16. The first change to the US 16 routing in the Detroit area was made in 1933 when the highway was moved to bypass Farmington, with the old routing retained as a state highway.

==== Metro Detroit freeways ====
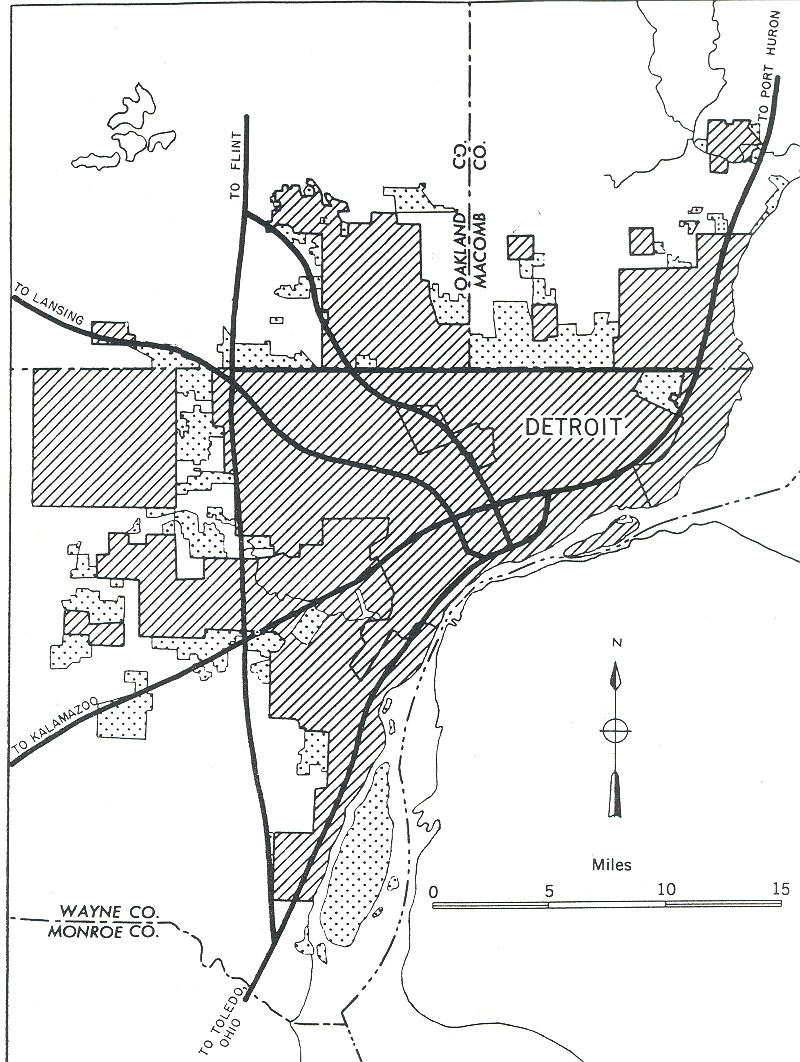
Planning map for the Detroit area freeways from 1955

MSHD had plans to upgrade the US 16 corridor to freeway standards in the middle of the 20th century. The first planning map in 1947 for what later became the Interstate Highway System showed a highway in the corridor. The General Location of National System of Interstate Highways Including All Additional Routes at Urban Areas Designated in September 1955, or Yellow Book after the cover color, showed generalized plans for the locations of Interstate Highways as designated in 1955. This also included a highway in the US 16 corridor. The 1957 approval for the Interstate Highway System replaced much of US 16 with a portion of Interstate 94 (I-94). MSHD submitted a recommended numbering plan for the Interstates in 1958 that showed I-96 following the US 16 corridor.

The segments of the road between Brighton and Farmington were upgraded in 1956. The MSHD initially signed the various freeways as Interstates in 1959, and US 16 through the Farmington area gained the additional I-96 numbering. Two years later, the business route through Farmington was redesignated as a business loop of I-96 instead of US 16. The final connection for I-96 between Lansing and Brighton was completed in late 1962, and the US 16 designation was decommissioned in the state. The sections of highway through the Detroit metro area were given Business Loop (BL) or Business Spur (BS) I-96 designations.

Until the 1970s, the freeway section of M-5 was part of I-96

When I-96 was completed in 1977, several highway designations were shifted in the Metro Detroit area. The BS I-96 designation was removed from Grand River Avenue. Rather than revert to its original number, M-16, MDOT selected M-5 as the new highway designation. Grand River was signed as M-5 between 8 Mile Road and I-96 exit 185 while leaving Grand River Avenue southeast of I-96 an unsigned state trunkline, OLD BS I-96. Both the portion of BS I-96 north of 8 Mile Road and the stub of I-96 that continued out to I-275 became part of M-102. In 2016, as part of a street light replacement project along Grand River Avenue, M-5 trailblazers were installed along Grand River between its previous eastern terminus at I-96 exit 185 and Old BS I-96's former eastern terminus in Downtown Detroit. New signage for M-10 exit 2C (serving Grand River Avenue) installed in 2018 included M-5 trailblazers, further cementing this extension.

==== Haggerty Connector ====
A freeway running north of Novi to the Davisburg area was included in the original Interstate Highway plans for Michigan. Originally included in the corridor for I-275, the Michigan Highway Commission canceled the northern section of the highway on January 26, 1977, after it spent $1.6 million (equivalent to $9.05 million in 2025) the year before purchasing land for the roadway. This northern section was not planned as an Interstate Highway at that time, bearing the designation M-275 instead. Opposition to construction came from various citizen's groups and different levels of local government. Additionally, both The Detroit News and Detroit Free Press opposed the project. The Detroit City Council, led by then-Chairman Carl Levin opposed the plan. Levin said at the time, "At last I think people are waking up to the dangers of more and more expressways. At some point we've got to say enough. And I think we've reached it." The US Department of the Interior reviewed the state's environmental impact study of the project and stated the project, "will cause irreparable damages on recreation lands, wetlands, surface waters and wildlife habitat." The total project to link Farmington Hills with Davisburg with the 24-mile (39 km) freeway would have cost $69.5 million (equivalent to $369 million in 2025) and saved drivers an estimated eight minutes off travel time around the city of Detroit.

After many years of inactivity, further work began along this same route, but the resulting highway was designated as a northern extension of M-5 rather than I-275 or M-275. The first section of this freeway extension was opened in October 1994. This extended the route from M-5's previous terminus at M-102 (8 Mile Road) over the latter highway's alignment west and north to 12 Mile Road. A plan enacted by then Governor John Engler in 1995 angered road officials when funding was diverted from county road commissions to help complete state highway projects like the M-5 Haggerty Connector project. In 1999, a second extension of M-5 was completed to 14 Mile Road, but only as an expressway. The final two miles (3.2 km) between 14 Mile Road and Pontiac Trail opened to traffic on November 1, 2002. In 2011, a roundabout was placed at the northern terminus of M-5. This last project also included a northern extension of roadway into the Eldorado Golf Course in Commerce Township to better serve the community. This extension does not carry the M-5 designation.

== Exit list ==
County	Location	mi	km	Exit	Destinations	Notes
Oakland	Commerce Township	0.000	0.000		Pontiac Trail; Martin Parkway	Roundabout; roadway continues from the north as Martin Parkway
Oakland	Novi	3.464	5.575		North end of freeway	
Oakland	Novi	4.094	6.589		12 Mile Road	Collector-distributor lanes for 12 Mile also connect to the ramps for I-96 westbound
Oakland	Novi	4.935	7.942		I-96 west – Lansing	Exits 163 (from westbound M-5) or 164 (from eastbound M-5) on I-96
Oakland	Novi	5.116	8.233		I-96 east / I-275 south – Detroit, Toledo	Exit 165 on I-96/I-275
Oakland	Farmington Hills	6.122	9.852		I-696 east (Reuther Freeway) – Port Huron	Exit 1 on I-696
Oakland	Farmington Hills	6.966	11.211	13	Grand River Avenue, 10 Mile Road	
Oakland	Farmington	9.198– 9.657	14.803– 15.541	16	9 Mile Road, Farmington Road	Eastbound exit and entrance
Oakland	Farmington Hills	11.070	17.815	—	Grand River Avenue – Farmington	Westbound exit and eastbound entrance at east end of freeway; M-5 joins Grand River Avenue eastbound and departs westbound
Oakland–Wayne county line	Farmington Hills–Livonia city line	12.346– 12.368	19.869– 19.904		M-102 east (8 Mile Road)	8 Mile Road is the county line; western terminus of M-102
Wayne	Detroit	14.891– 14.916	23.965– 24.005		US 24 (Telegraph Road)	
Wayne	Detroit	18.340– 18.351	29.515– 29.533		M-39 (Southfield Freeway)	Exit 12 on M-39
Wayne	Detroit	20.791– 20.807	33.460– 33.486		I-96 (Jeffries Freeway)	Exit 185 on I-96
Wayne	Detroit	22.591– 22.615	36.357– 36.395		I-96 (Jeffries Freeway)	Westbound entrance and eastbound exit from I-96; exit 187 on I-96
Wayne	Detroit	25.483– 25.493	41.011– 41.027		I-94 (Edsel Ford Freeway)	Exit 214 on I-94
Wayne	Detroit	27.187– 27.204	43.753– 43.781		M-10 (Lodge Freeway)	Southbound exit from and northbound entrance to M-10; exit 2C on M-10
Wayne	Detroit	27.600– 27.617	44.418– 44.445		I-75 (Fisher Freeway)	Exit 50 on I-75
Wayne	Detroit	27.890	44.885		Grand River Avenue; Cass Avenue; Middle Street	Roadway continues as Grand River Avenue
1.000 mi = 1.609 km; 1.000 km = 0.621 mi: Incomplete access
