= M-114 (Michigan highway) =

Former state highway in Kent County, Michigan, United States

M-114
- M-114 highlighted in red on a modern map

Route information
- Maintained by MSHD
- Length: 13.454 mi (21.652 km)
- Existed: c. 1929–by 1945

South leg
- South end: Byp. US 16 in Paris Township
- North end: 3 Mile Road & East Beltline Avenue near Comstock Park

West leg
- West end: 3 Mile Road & Coit Avenue in Comstock Park
- East end: 3 Mile Road & East Beltline Avenue near Comstock Park

North leg
- South end: 3 Mile Road & East Beltline Avenue near Comstock Park
- North end: US 131 near Comstock Park

Location
- Country: United States
- State: Michigan
- Counties: Kent

Highway system
- Michigan State Trunkline Highway System; Interstate; US; State; Byways
← M-113	→ M-115

M-114 was the designation of a former state trunkline highway and planned beltline in the US state of Michigan around the city of Grand Rapids. It was designated by the end of 1929 on various streets in adjoining cities and townships. By the 1940s, sections of it on the west and south sides of Grand Rapids were given new designations and the segment along the east side of town was finished. By late 1945 the highway designation was completely decommissioned in favor of other numbers. M-114 split into two branches, one running east–west and the other running north–south. The east–west spur routing is now local streets while the rest is part of state highways.

== History ==
The first segments of M-114 were completed by January 1, 1930, and ran along the west side of Grand Rapids, on what is now Wilson Avenue between Lake Michigan Drive and Leonard Street. At the same time, what would become a spur was also finished from the town of Cascade to US Highway 131 (US 131, Division Avenue). By July 1 that same year, the southern segment was extended west to Clyde Park Avenue in Wyoming Township. By the end of 1936 M-114 was a three-legged trunkline around the Grand Rapids area. It started at US 16 in Walker Township and ran south to Grandville where it turned to run eastward to the community of Cascade. The third leg was shown on maps as under construction from a junction in Paris Township north to a junction with US 16 in East Grand Rapids; the trunkline continued north from US 16 to a junction with US 131 in Plainfield Township north of Grand Rapids.

By June 15, 1942, the highways in the Grand Rapids area were reconfigured. A Bypass US 16 (Byp. US 16) designation was assigned to the portion of M-114 that traveled around the southwest side of Grand Rapids (now M-11), leaving just the east and unfinished north segments left. The section along the east side of the city was completed as M-114. A northern leg was added along 3 Mile Road at the same time. By 1945, the northern leg of M-114 was turned back to local control and removed from the highway system. The eastern leg was assigned a Byp. US 131 designation, thereby eliminating the last remaining portion of M-114. A Byp. M-21 designation was also used along part of the southern and eastern legs. East Beltline now carries M-37 and M-44.

== Route description ==
As it existed before the designation was removed, M-114 started at the corner of Byp. US 16 (28th Street) and what is now East Beltline Avenue in Paris Township (now Kentwood) and ran northward. The trunkline intersected the mainline for US 16/M-50 at Cascade Road and the mainline for M-21 at Fulton Street near East Grand Rapids in Grand Rapids Township. Further north, the highway split into two. In Plainfield Township, a leg of M-114 continued west along the modern 3 Mile Road through an intersection with US 131 to terminate at Coit Avenue near the Grand River and the other leg continued north to a terminus with US 131 at Northland Drive and Plainfield Avenue.

== Major intersections ==
South leg

The entire highway was in Kent County.

Location	mi	km	Destinations	Notes
Paris Township	0.000	0.000	Byp. US 16 (28th Street) – Muskegon, Lansing	Southern terminus
Grand Rapids Township	3.089	4.971	US 16 / M-50 (Cascade Road) – Muskegon, Lansing	
Grand Rapids Township	3.522	5.668	M-21 (Fulton Street) – Grand Rapids, Flint	
Grand Rapids Township	4.930	7.934	M-114 west (3 Mile Road) M-114 north (East Beltline Avenue)	Tri-point
1.000 mi = 1.609 km; 1.000 km = 0.621 mi

West leg

The entire highway was in Grand Rapids Township, Kent County.

mi	km	Destinations	Notes
0.000	0.000	M-114 south (East Beltline Avenue) M-114 north (East Beltline Avenue)	Tri-point
2.824	4.545	US 131 – Grand Rapids, Cadillac	
3.389	5.454	Coit Avenue	Western terminus
1.000 mi = 1.609 km; 1.000 km = 0.621 mi

North leg

The entire highway was in Kent County.

Location	mi	km	Destinations	Notes
Grand Rapids Township	4.930	7.934	M-114 south (East Beltline Avenue) M-114 west (3 Mile Road)	Tri-point
Plainfield Township	10.065	16.198	US 131 – Grand Rapids, Cadillac	Northern terminus
1.000 mi = 1.609 km; 1.000 km = 0.621 mi
