= U.S. Route 16 in Michigan =

Former U.S. Highway in Michigan

US Highway 16
- US 16 highlighted in red on a modern map

Route information
- Maintained by MSHD
- Length: 210.643 mi (338.997 km)
- Existed: November 11, 1926–1962
- History: Replaced by I-96

Major junctions
- West end: Car ferry docks in Muskegon
- US 31 near Muskegon; US 131 in Grand Rapids; US 27 in Lansing; US 23 near Brighton; US 24 in Detroit
- East end: US 10 / US 12 / US 25 in Detroit

Location
- Country: United States
- State: Michigan
- Counties: Muskegon, Ottawa, Kent, Ionia, Clinton, Ingham, Livingston, Oakland, Wayne

Highway system
- United States Numbered Highway System; List; Special; Divided; Michigan State Trunkline Highway System; Interstate; US; State; Byways
| ← M-15 | US 16, M-16 | → M-17 |
| ← M-125 | M-126 | → US 127 |

US Highway 16 (US 16), also called Grand River Avenue for much of its length in the state, was a principal road prior to the post-World War II construction of freeways in the state of Michigan. Before the creation of the United States Numbered Highway System in 1926, the highway had been designated as a state highway numbered M-16. The modern route of Grand River Avenue cuts across the Lower Peninsula in a northwest–southeast fashion from near Grand Rapids to Detroit. Before the late 1950s and early 1960s, US 16 followed other roads between Muskegon and Grand Rapids, and then Grand River Avenue through Lansing to Detroit. In the years immediately preceding the creation of the Interstate Highway System, US 16 was shifted from older roads to newer freeways. Later, it was co-designated as an Interstate Highway. When the gap in the freeway was filled in around Lansing, the US 16 designation was decommissioned in the state. The freeway was solely designated Interstate 96 (I-96) east of Grand Rapids and I-196 west of that city.

The original pathway along the Grand River Avenue corridor was an Indian trail, a footpath used by the native population. The first European settlers to the area also used this trail and in some areas enlarged it for the passage of wagons. In Detroit, Grand River is one of five major avenues (along with Woodward, Michigan, Gratiot, and Jefferson) planned by Judge Augustus Woodward in 1805 that extended from Downtown Detroit in differing radial directions; Grand River Avenue extends northwesterly from the city's downtown. In the middle of the 19th century, the trail was expanded into a plank road that formed the basis for one of the first state trunkline highways as M-16 in the early 20th century. Later, the highway was rerouted to replace M-126 and create M-104. Current segments of the roadway are still part of the state highway system as sections of M-5, M-11, M-43 or business loops off I-96. The portion of Grand River Avenue in Detroit between I-96 and the intersection with Cass Avenue and Middle Street in Downtown Detroit was formerly an unsigned state trunkline, sometimes referred to as Old Business Spur I-96 (Old BS I-96) until 2016 when it was designated as an extension of M-5.

== Route description ==
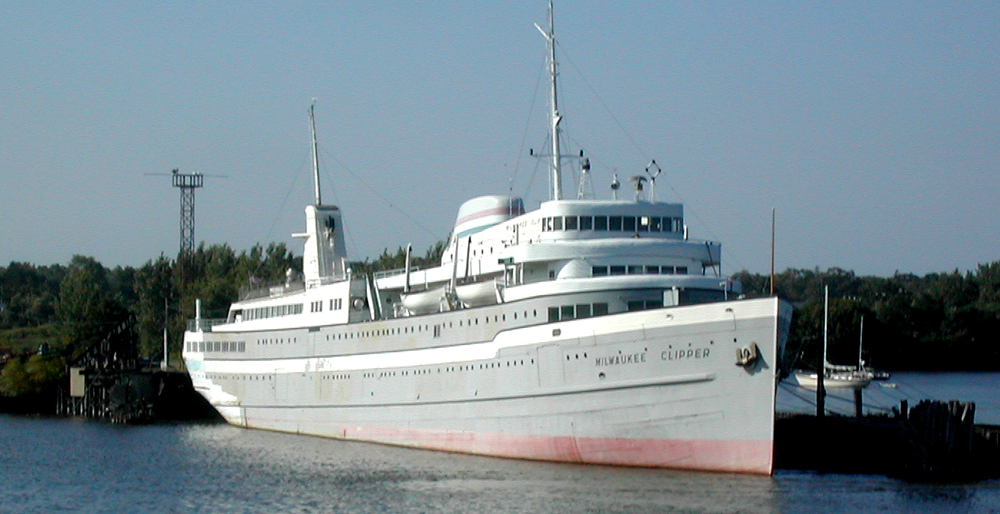
SS Milwaukee Clipper docked in Muskegon

At the time of its decommissioning, US 16 started its run through Michigan at the Grand Trunk Western Railroad docks in Muskegon. The SS Milwaukee Clipper operated as a car ferry across Lake Michigan, connecting Muskegon to Milwaukee, Wisconsin, where US 16 continued to the west. From the docks, US 16 and M-46 traveled concurrently south and then east through downtown Muskegon. At Peck Street, US 16 turned south along Business US 31 (Bus. US 31). These two highways ran concurrently out of town to the south through Muskegon Heights to Norton Shores. There, the business loop ended at US 31, and US 16 joined the I-196 freeway headed east. (Later, the I-96 and I-196 designations west of Grand Rapids would be flipped, but at the time leading up to US 16's decommissioning in the state of Michigan, this had not yet been approved.) The I-196/US 16 freeway traveled southeast of Norton Shores through woodlands in rural Muskegon County parallel to the former US 16 routing through Fruitport to Nunica in Ottawa County. The freeway turned more directly east in Nunica past the eastern terminus of M-104, and continued through more mixed forest and grassland terrain to serve the communities of Coopersville and Marne.

As the freeway approached Kent County, it met the western terminus of M-11 which was the former routing of US 16 through the Grand Rapids metropolitan area. I-196/US 16 continued eastward around the north side of the metropolitan area through the suburbs of Walker and Comstock Park. The freeway intersected the contemporaneous routing of US 131 along the East Beltline and curved south through the eastern edge of Grand Rapids to meet the end of I-96 east of downtown. There I-196 ended and US 16 was transferred to the I-96 freeway. I-96/US 16 continued southward intersecting Cascade Road, which was previously US 16. Cascade Road east of this interchange meets the westernmost part of Grand River Avenue, which carried US 16 east continuously to Downtown Detroit. (Note: Grand River Avenue ends at Cascade Road, but the historic routing carried it through Ada and Plainfield Township along the Grand River. The western end is at East Beltline, short of its westernmost extent in Grand Rapids.)

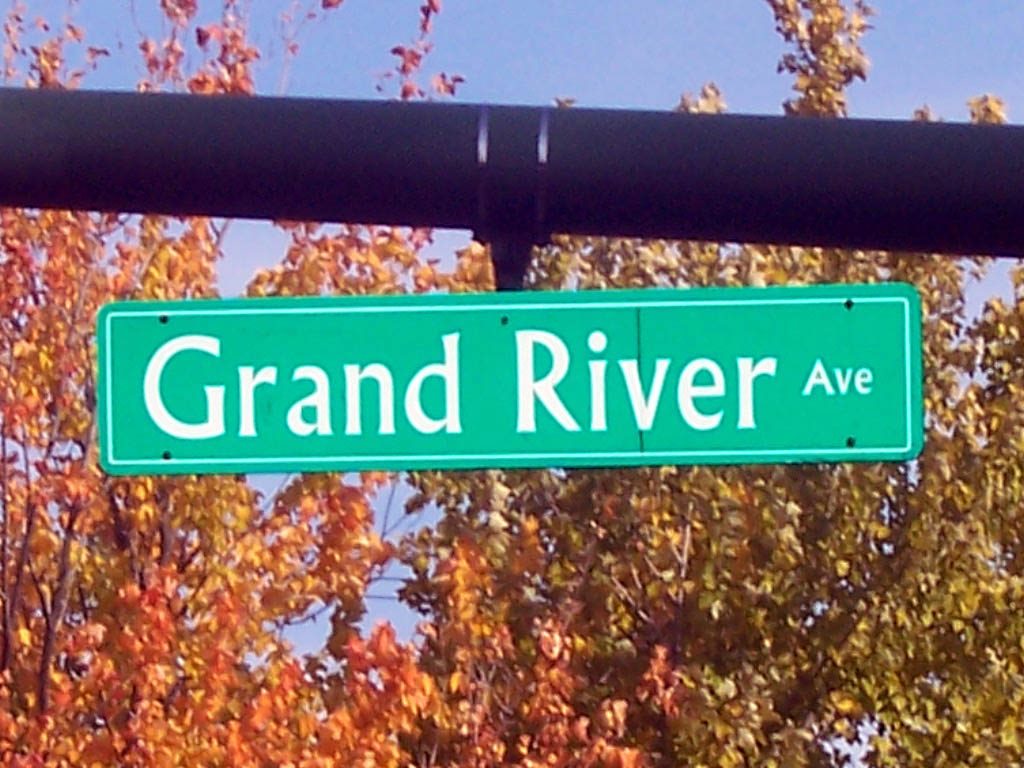
Grand River Avenue sign in East Lansing

M-50 also joined the freeway at Cascade Road headed east, and together I-96/US 16/M-50 continued through eastern Kent County. M-50 departed to the south near Lowell, and the freeway crossed into southern Ionia County. Passing south of Portland, the freeway crossed east into Clinton County. North of Grand Ledge, I-96 ended and US 16 followed Wright Road off the freeway to Grand River Avenue. From there east, US 16 resumed its historic routing into the city of Lansing. Grand River Avenue carried the highway past the Capital City Airport and east to Larch Street, where US 16 turned south along US 27 north of downtown Lansing. At Saginaw Street, eastbound US 16 turned east on the one-way street, while westbound traffic ran a block north on Grand River Avenue. The two directions of travel merge at the east end of Saginaw Street in East Lansing. Grand River Avenue through East Lansing follows a tree-lined boulevard that forms the division between the campus of Michigan State University to the south and the rest of the city to the north. US 16 continued east in Ingham County through Okemos and rural parts of the county through Williamston and Webberville.

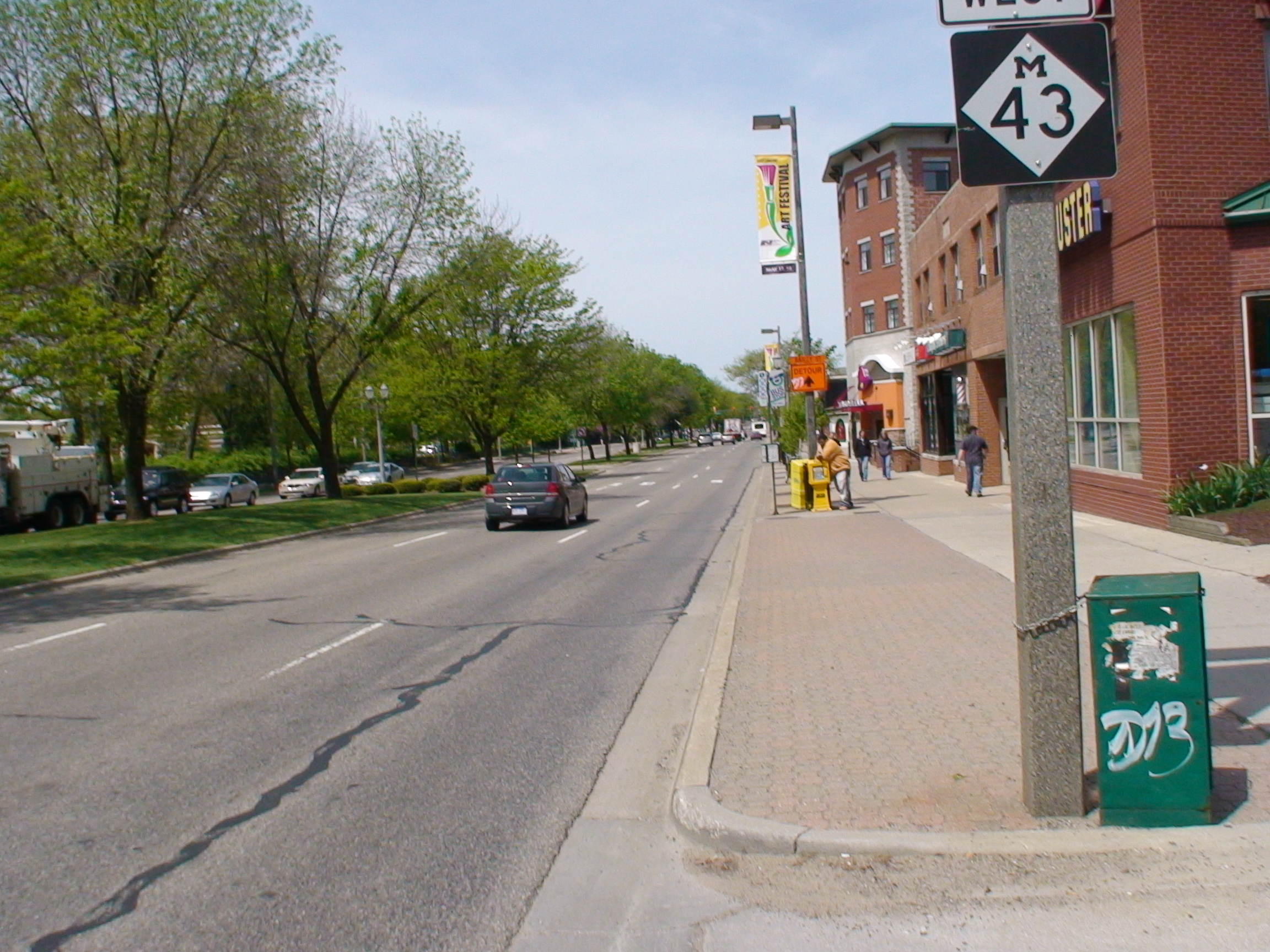
Modern M-43 running along Grand River Avenue at Collingwood Drive in East Lansing (2008)

Grand River Avenue crosses to the east into Livingston County through Fowlerville to Howell. In Howell, Grand River Avenue meets Hartland Road which carries M-59; the highway also met M-155 in downtown, which at the time provided access to the Howell State Hospital. In the approach to Brighton, Grand River Avenue passes through rural southeast Michigan lake country. In Brighton, Grand River Avenue crossed the western end of the I-96 freeway. US 16 merged onto the freeway, and I-96/US 16 met the northern end of the US 23 freeway. I-96/US 16 continued east into Oakland County through Wixom and Novi.

Near Farmington, I-96/US 16 continued to the southeast of the present-day I-96/I-275/I-696/M-5 interchange along the current M-5 freeway. Grand River Avenue through there was Business Loop I-96 (BL I-96). The freeway ends at a junction with Grand River Avenue that also marked the end of the business loop and the eastern end of I-96 at the time. From there, US 16 continued along Grand River Avenue the rest of way into Downtown Detroit. Along that routing, it intersected US 24 at Telegraph Road and M-39 at Southfield Road. US 16 continued past the eastern terminus of M-14 at Plymouth Road, which until 1956 had carried US 12, which had then been concurrent with US 16 to Cadillac Square. There US 16 terminated at a common point with US 10 (Woodward Avenue) and US 12 (Michigan Avenue), which had replaced US 112 less than a year earlier. US 25 ran through the square on Fort Street and Gratiot Avenue.

== History ==
The history of Grand River Avenue, and US 16 in Michigan, dates back to before the earliest settlement of Michigan by Europeans. The route has been the basis for an Indian trail, a pathway for European settlers, a state highway, a part of the US Highway System, and a section of the Interstate Highway System.

=== Indian trail to state highway ===
M-16
- Location: Muskegon–Detroit
- Existed: c. July 1, 1919–November 11, 1926

The chief transportation routes in 1701 were the Indian footpaths that crossed the future state of Michigan; the Grand River Trail was one of these thirteen trails at the time. In 1805, Detroit created 120-foot (37 m) rights-of-way for the principal streets of the city, Grand River Avenue included. This street plan was devised by Augustus Woodward and others following a devastating fire in Detroit. A ten-year project to construct a plank road between Detroit and Howell was authorized in 1820 along the Grand River Trail. Grand River Avenue was included as one of Five Great Military Roads by Governor Lewis Cass in 1825, along with the River Road, Michigan Avenue, Woodward Avenue and Gratiot Avenue. The Grand River Road, precursor to the modern Grand River Avenue was named by Benjamin Williams, cofounder of Owosso. The original Native American name for the river was Wash-ten-ong sibi meaning "the river that extends far off", or "far into the interior", which was translated as La Grande Riviere, the French name for the river; this name was then applied to the name of the trail that paralleled at least half of the river's length.

The opening of the Erie Canal in New York in 1826 brought new settlers to the Great Lakes region, and to the future state of Michigan. Many of these settlers began their inland journeys in Detroit. At first the Grand River Road was a "deep rutted, ditch bordered road". The road branched into two at Rouge (now Redford); the southern branch roughly followed the modern route of Grand River Avenue and the northern route ran by way of Pontiac along Woodward Avenue and the modern M-21 to the north of the Lansing area. From Bancroft, several trails branched off, including the northern branch of the Grand River Road and the Saginaw Trail. The two branches merged back together near Dewitt and continued west toward Ionia and on to Grand Rapids and Newton (now Grand Haven). The early travelers plied the road in wagons pulled by oxen or horses, and drivers charged between four and seven cents a mile (equivalent to $1.11–1.94/mi in 2024). The horses were exchanged every 12–15 miles (19–24 km) with the speed averaging around 8–10 miles per hour (13–16 km/h) with few obstacles.

Congress further aided the road in 1835 with an appropriation of $25,000 (equivalent to $800,000 in 2024) for a 20-foot-wide (6 m) road on 100 feet (30 m) of right-of-way. These improvements included removing brush and debris and the construction of bridges across the Rouge, Shiawassee, Red Cedar and Grand rivers. The Grand River Road was a major route for settlers headed inland to Grand Rapids in 1836, as the shortest route for travelers coming from Detroit. An economic panic in 1837 drove settlers from New York to Michigan; these were the travelers who followed the Grand River Road. New settlements were created along the route, every six miles (9.7 km) or so, that distance being a good day's travel by horse. Approximately 120 wagons left Detroit each day between August and November 1843.

After statehood in 1837, Michigan assumed the costs for construction work to the Grand River Trail. At that time, about 60 miles (97 km) had been surveyed from Detroit westward. The new state lacked the money to continue improvements to the road, and Michigan petitioned Congress for the better part of the next decade for money to complete the work. When the state capital was moved to Lansing in 1847, an improved road was needed to the capital city. The first segments of roadway were privatized starting in 1844. In 1850, the Michigan State Legislature established the Lansing and Howell Plank Road Company, which set about converting various Indian trails into the Lansing–Howell Plank Road, a task the company completed by 1853. At Howell the road connected with the Detroit–Howell Plank Road, establishing the first improved connection direct from the state capital to Michigan's largest metropolis. The Lansing–Detroit Plank Road was a toll road until the 1880s, and it eventually evolved into the eastern part of the modern Grand River Avenue.

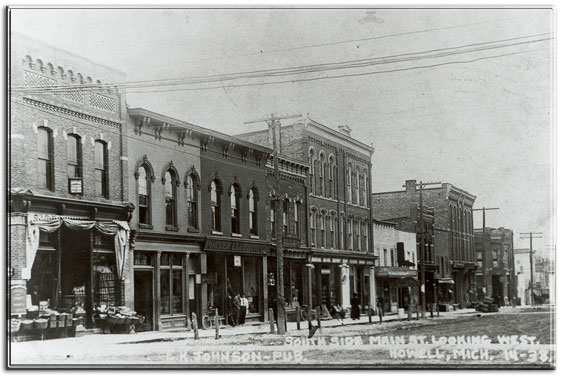
West Grand River Avenue in Howell, 1900

By 1900, only a short stretch of the Detroit–Howell Plank Road was still made of planks; most of the other plank roads had been converted to gravel by this time. On May 13, 1913, the Michigan Legislature passed the State Reward Trunk Line Highway Act (Public Act 334 of 1913) that created the original state highway system. In that act, Grand River Avenue between Detroit and Grand Rapids was included as Division 9 of the system. The state highways were signposted starting in 1919, and on the first maps published on July 1 of that year, the Michigan State Highway Department (MSHD) had applied the M-16 number to Grand River Avenue across the state between Grand Haven and Detroit. M-16 was rerouted in the Lansing area in 1925, running along Grand River Avenue from Grand Ledge to East Lansing. The former routing through Downtown Lansing on Michigan Avenue became part of M-39 and the section north of Grand Ledge was eventually redesignated M-100. A second realignment moved M-16 to follow Grand River Avenue from Ionia through Ada. The former alignment became a part of M-21. On August 7, 1926, the state completed paving on M-16, opening it to traffic as "the first paved highway across the state".

The M-16 designation lasted for seven years. As the states were meeting with the American Association of State Highway Officials (AASHO, now AASHTO) to plan the United States Numbered Highway System, the route of M-16 was originally planned for inclusion in US 18. When the system was created on November 11, 1926, Grand River Avenue and M-16 became part of US 16.

=== US Highway to Interstate ===
M-126
- Location: Muskegon Heights–Nunica
- Length: 11.94 mi (19.22 km)
- Existed: 1934–1940

In 1929, Allan Williams placed a picnic table on the side of the road along US 16 south of Saranac. Williams was the Ionia County engineer in charge of the various roads in the county, and that location is "what many consider to be the nation's first roadside table". (Note: Other sources state that the first roadside park in the United States was created by Herbert Larson along what is now US 2 near Iron River in 1919–20.) The first change to the US 16 routing was made in 1933 when the highway was moved to bypass Farmington, with the old routing retained as a state highway. The next year, in 1934, M-126 was created between Nunica and Muskegon. In 1940, US 16 was rerouted to replace M-126, and the former route of US 16 between Nunica and Grand Haven was redesignated M-104. Two further changes during 1941–42 rerouted the western end in Muskegon to end at the car ferry docks. Previously, motorists had to navigate from the western end along other roads to the ferry connection to the rest of US 16 in Wisconsin. The second change routed Bypass US 16 (Byp. US 16) along 28th Street and Wilson (previously the South Beltline and West Beltline sections of M-114) in the Grand Rapids area. The US 16 designation was moved in 1953 to replace Byp. US 16 while the former routing through downtown Grand Rapids was redesignated Business US 16 (Bus. US 16).

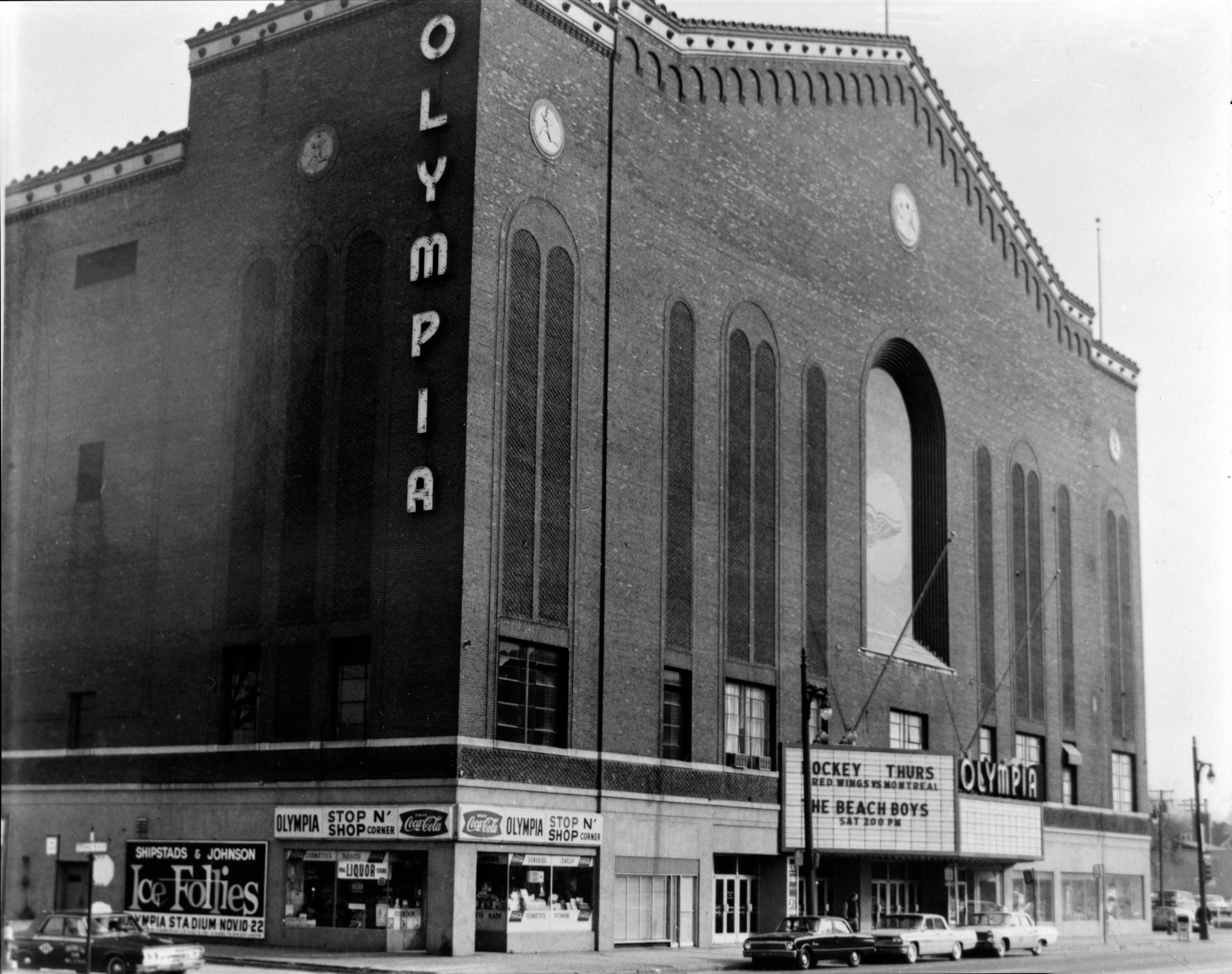
Olympia Stadium on Grand River Avenue, home of the Detroit Red Wings from 1927 to 1979

MSHD had plans to upgrade the US 16 corridor to freeway standards in the middle of the 20th century. The first planning map in 1947 for what later became the Interstate Highway System showed a highway in the corridor. The General Location of National System of Interstate Highways Including All Additional Routes at Urban Areas Designated in September 1955, showed generalized plans for the locations of Interstate Highways as designated in 1955. This also included a highway in the US 16 corridor. The 1957 approval for the Interstate Highway System replaced the Grand Rapids–Detroit section of US 16 with a portion of Interstate 94 (I-94), with the remainder to be I-94N. MSHD submitted a recommended numbering plan for the Interstates in 1958 that showed I-96 following the US 16 corridor. When initially approved, the Muskegon–Grand Rapids segment of US 16 was to be numbered as I-196 while the remainder was part of I-96.

Segments of the road were upgraded in 1956 between Coopersville and Marne, Portland and Eagle, and Brighton and Farmington. By 1962, freeway construction allowed motorists to travel between Muskegon and the Lansing area on a freeway, bypassing the old Grand River Avenue route. The final connection between Lansing and Brighton was completed in late 1962. At that time, the US 16 designation, which had been applied alongside the I-96 and I-196 designations, was decommissioned. Segments of the old highway were retained in the state highway system under different numbers. Sections through Portland, Lansing, Howell, Farmington and Detroit were given Business Loop (BL) or Business Spur (BS) I-96 designations. The section between Lansing and Webberville became part of an extended M-43. Other sections in the Detroit area became parts of M-102, M-5, or unsigned state highway.

=== Post-Interstate era ===
External image
- Old Plank Road demolition, facing west in East Lansing near Bailey Street in early 1996

After US 16 was transferred to the new freeway, Grand River Avenue lost its state highway status along most of its length. Today the roadway remains the "Main Street" of over a dozen Michigan cities and a scenic route through one of the state's most populated corridors. In 1995, major reconstruction work along Grand River Avenue in East Lansing uncovered rotting logs, buried about 2 feet (0.61 m) below the present grade, that had been used as underlayment for the plank road surface in a low, swampy area. The logs had been in place for nearly 150 years. In 2004, the state transferred several blocks at the eastern end of Grand River Avenue to the City of Detroit. State trunkline control now ends at the corner of Grand River Avenue, Middle Street, and Cass Avenue.

Community leaders in Lansing have proposed renaming a section of Grand River Avenue in Old Town Lansing for César Chávez, the Mexican American civil rights activist. The group "Lansing for Cesar E. Chavez" was raising funds to rename the section between Oakland and Pine streets in Old Town. Previously, a section of Grand Avenue was renamed for Chávez in 1994, but the voters overturned the decision. The renaming proposal was even mentioned as a way to untangle a maze of different branches of Grand River Avenue running through Old Town. Currently, East Grand River Avenue and North Grand River Avenue bridge between sections of Grand River Avenue, in addition to Grand Avenue which runs along the Grand River near downtown. While Lansing's Latino community supported the proposal, the business community opposed it. One shop owner said she would have $10,000 in costs associated with a name change, adding, "I think there's many beautiful ways to honor such an incredible man. Changing five blocks of a street doesn't seem to do justice." Another business owner cited the work the Old Town Commercial Association has done to market the area using the Grand River Avenue name, marketing that would be useless after a name change. The compromise solution reached in August 2010 was to rename lot 56, where Old Town holds festivals, to Cesar Chavez Plaza. Street signs would be installed marking parts of Grand River Avenue as Cesar E. Chavez Avenue, but only in a memorial capacity; the street would still be officially named Grand River Avenue.

== Memorial highway designations ==
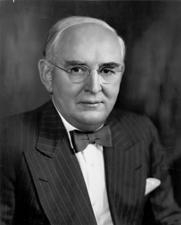
Arthur H. Vandenberg

Born in Grand Rapids in 1884, Arthur H. Vandenberg was appointed to the United States Senate upon the death in office of Woodbridge N. Ferris in 1928. Vandenberg, a Republican, served as a member of the "isolationist bloc", and was an active opponent of the New Deal policies of Franklin D. Roosevelt. The senator declined a nomination for Vice President in 1936. In the aftermath of World War II, Vandenberg's world view changed significantly. He helped to draft the United Nations Charter and worked to secure its unanimous ratification in the Senate. He also worked to secure passage of the Marshall Plan and helped to establish the North Atlantic Treaty Organization. After his death in 1951, Michigan residents wanted to memorialize Vandenberg. The following year, the Michigan Legislature dedicated the length of US 16 from Muskegon to Detroit as the Arthur Vandenberg Memorial Highway by enacting Public Act 70 of 1952.

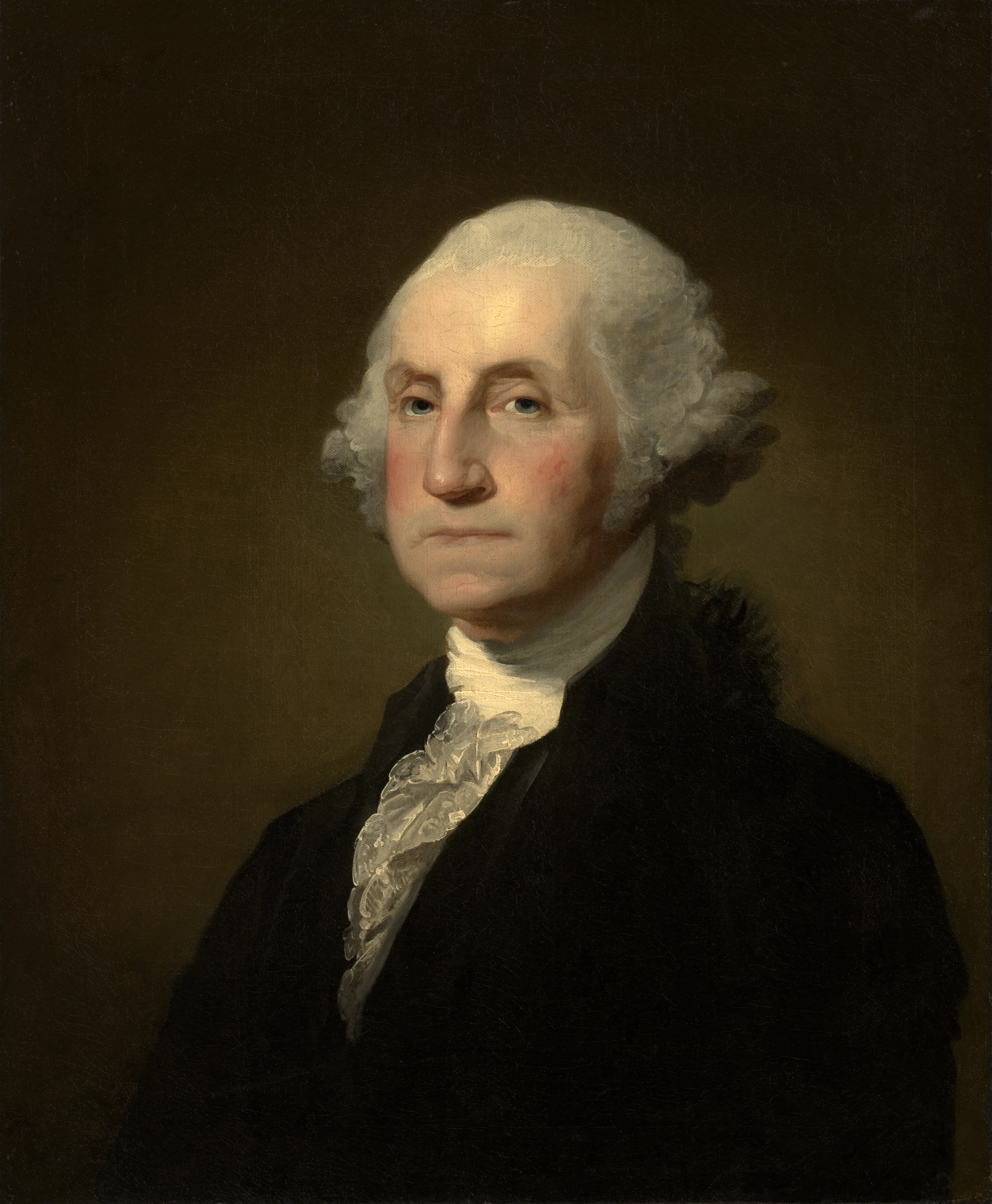
George Washington

Vandenberg was not the only national figure honored with a memorial designation along the route of US 16 in Michigan. For a period from the 1930s through the 1950s, the highway used a few blocks of Washington Boulevard to connect between Grand River and Michigan avenues on its route through Detroit to its terminus at Cadillac Square. This street was named in honor of George Washington for his service as the "father of his country". The street was named by Judge Woodward as a part of his general street plan for the city of Detroit in 1807.

== Major intersections ==
| County | Location | mi | km | Destinations | Notes |
|---|---|---|---|---|---|
| Muskegon | Muskegon | 0.000 | 0.000 | Car ferry docks M-46 east (Mart Street) | SS Milwaukee Clipper connected to US 16 in Wisconsin; western terminus of M-46 |
| Muskegon | Muskegon | 1.100 | 1.770 | Bus. US 31 north / M-46 east (Peck Street) | Northern end of Bus. US 31 concurrency; eastern end of M-46 concurrency |
| Muskegon | Norton Shores | 6.160 | 9.914 | I-196 east US 31 – Ludington, Holland Bus. US 31 north (Airline Highway) | Western end of I-196 concurrency; southern end of Bus. US 31 concurrency |
| Ottawa | Nunica | 15.452 | 24.868 | M-104 west – Grand Haven | Eastern terminus of M-104 |
| Ottawa | Tallmadge Township | 30.099 | 48.440 | Bus. US 16 east / M-11 east (Remembrance Road) – Grand Rapids | Western terminus of M-11 |
| Kent | Walker | 36.455 | 58.669 | M-37 north (Alpine Avenue) – Traverse City | Western end of M-37 concurrency |
| Kent | Grand Rapids | 39.223 | 63.123 | Bus. US 131 (Plainfield Avenue) | |
| Kent | Grand Rapids | 43.233 | 69.577 | I-196 west I-96 east | Eastern end of I-196 concurrency; western end of I-96 concurrency |
| Kent | Grand Rapids | 43.961 | 70.748 | US 131 / M-37 south (East Beltline Avenue) – Cadillac, Kalamazoo, Hastings | Eastern end of M-37 concurrency |
| Kent | Grand Rapids Township | 44.897 | 72.255 | M-21 (Fulton Street) – Holland, Flint | |
| Kent | Grand Rapids Township | 46.174 | 74.310 | Bus. US 16 west / M-50 west (Cascade Road) – Grand Rapids | Western end of M-50 concurrency |
| Kent | Cascade Township | 49.146 | 79.093 | M-11 west (28th Street) | Eastern terminus of M-11 |
| Kent | Lowell Township | 58.463 | 94.087 | M-50 east / M-91 north – Jackson, Greenville | Eastern end of M-50 concurrency; southern terminus of M-91 |
| Ionia | Berlin Township | 73.587 | 118.427 | M-66 – Ionia, Battle Creek | |
| Clinton | Eagle Township | 92.578 | 148.990 | I-96 west M-100 – Grand Ledge | I-96 temporarily ended here; US 16 follows Grand River Avenue east |
| Ingham | Lansing | 101.738 | 163.731 | M-174 north (Logan Street) | |
| Ingham | Lansing | 103.103 | 165.928 | US 27 (Larch Street) – Clare | Northern end of US 27 concurrency |
| Ingham | Lansing | 103.630 | 166.776 | M-43 west / M-78 (Saginaw Street) – Hastings US 27 south (Larch Street) | Eastern terminus of M-43; southern end of US 27 concurrency |
| Ingham | Leroy Township | 121.099 | 194.890 | M-47 north | Southern terminus of M-47 |
| Livingston | Howell | 157.476 | 253.433 | M-59 east – Pontiac | Western terminus of M-59 |
| Livingston | Howell | 160.154 | 257.743 | M-155 west | Eastern terminus of M-155 |
| Livingston | Brighton | 168.676 | 271.458 | I-96 east | Western end of I-96 freeway concurrency |
| Livingston | Brighton Township | 171.212 | 275.539 | US 23 – Flint, Ann Arbor | |
| Oakland | West Novi | 182.782 | 294.159 | M-218 east (Wixom Road) – Pontiac | Western terminus of M-218 |
| Oakland | Farmington | 189.210 | 304.504 | BL I-96 east | |
| Oakland | Farmington | 193.314 | 311.109 | I-96 west BL I-96 west | Eastern end of I-96 freeway concurrency |
| Oakland–Wayne county line | Farmington Township–Livonia city line | 194.590 | 313.162 | M-102 east (8 Mile Road) | 8 Mile Road is the county and city line; western terminus of M-102 |
| Wayne | Detroit | 197.135 | 317.258 | US 24 (Telegraph Road) – Toledo | |
| Wayne | Detroit | 200.584 | 322.809 | M-39 (Southfield Road) | |
| Wayne | Detroit | 204.499 | 329.109 | M-14 west (Plymouth Road) – Ann Arbor | Eastern terminus of M-14 |
| Wayne | Detroit | 207.727 | 334.304 | I-94 (Edsel Ford Freeway) | |
| Wayne | Detroit | 209.431 | 337.047 | BS I-696 (John C. Lodge Freeway) | |
| Wayne | Detroit | 210.643 | 338.997 | US 10 west (Woodward Avenue) – Pontiac US 12 west (Michigan Avenue) – Ypsilanti US 25 (Fort Street, Gratiot Avenue) – Port Huron, Toledo | Cadillac Square served as the common terminus for US 10, US 12 and US 16 |
1.000 mi = 1.609 km; 1.000 km = 0.621 mi: Concurrency terminus

== Related trunklines ==
=== Grand Rapids bypass ===
Bypass US Highway 16
- Location: Grand Rapids
- Length: 20.197 mi (32.504 km)
- Existed: 1942–1953

Bypass US Highway 16 (Byp. US 16) was a bypass route of US 16 in the Grand Rapids area. The highway became a part of the state highway system c. 1930 as a part of M-114, which was a beltline around the Grand Rapids area. By 1942, the trunkline was completed and reassigned a Byp. US 16 designation along the southern and western legs. The designation connected to US 16 in Walker Township (now the city of Walker) and ran south along what is now Wilson Avenue over the Grand River into Grandville. From there it turned easterly along what is now 28th Street through Wyoming and Paris townships (now the cities of Wyoming and Kentwood) before terminating at US 16 in Cascade Township. The designation was used until the mainline US 16 was rerouted over the bypass in 1953.

=== Grand Rapids business loop ===
Business US Highway 16
- Location: Grand Rapids
- Length: 17.102 mi (27.523 km)
- Existed: 1953–1962

Business US Highway 16 (Bus. US 16) was a business route in the Grand Rapids area in the 1950s and 1960s. When US 16 was rerouted to replace Byp. US 16 around the southern and western sides of the city in 1953, the former route of the mainline through downtown was redesignated as the business loop. That loop followed Remembrance Avenue southeasterly to Leonard Avenue in Walker Township. From there, the loop turned easterly on Leonard over the Grand River to Monroe Avenue before turning south parallel to the river along Monroe into downtown. In downtown Grand Rapids, Bus. US 16 turned eastward on Fulton Avenue into East Grand Rapids. There the loop followed Cascade Road into Cascade Township where it reconnected to US 16 at the intersection with 28th Street. Bus. US 16 lasted until 1962 when US 16 was decommissioned in Michigan.

=== Farmington alternate route ===
US Highway 16A
- Location: Farmington
- Length: 3.863 mi (6.217 km)
- Existed: 1933–1956

US Highway 16A (US 16A) was an alternate route for US 16 that bypassed Farmington. It was designated in 1933 for a new highway that bypassed downtown along what is now Freedom Road. In 1956, the designation was decommissioned when mainline US 16 was rerouted out of downtown Farmington, replacing US 16A. At the same time, the former route of the mainline through downtown was redesignated Bus. US 16.

=== Farmington business loop ===
Business US Highway 16
- Location: Farmington
- Length: 4.129 mi (6.645 km)
- Existed: 1956–1961

Business US Highway 16 (Bus. US 16) was a business loop through downtown Farmington along Grand River Avenue. Its western terminus was at the junction of US 16 and Grand River Avenue west of the city, and the eastern terminus was at the intersection between US 16 and Grand River Avenue southeast of Farmington. This highway was the original route of US 16 through downtown Farmington. In 1933, US 16 was routed onto a bypass route which had been constructed south of the city (the present-day Freedom Road) and the route through Farmington was retained as state trunkline. In 1956, a new bypass freeway was built just to the south of the old bypass as part of the "Brighton–Farmington Expressway" and the route through downtown was designated Bus. US 16. The original plans for I-96 called for it to replace US 16 and to run parallel to Grand River Avenue all the way from Farmington into downtown Detroit. In 1959, the Farmington bypass freeway was given the I-96 designation in addition to the US 16 moniker, and the business route was redesignated as Business Loop I-96 two years later.

== Notes ==
US Highway 16
| Previous state: Wisconsin | Michigan | Next state: Terminus |
