= M-10 (Michigan highway) =

State highway in Wayne and Oakland counties in Michigan, United States

M-10
- M-10 highlighted in red

Route information
- Maintained by MDOT
- Length: 22.881 mi (36.823 km)
- Existed: 1986–present

Major junctions
- South end: M-3 / BS I-375 in Detroit
- I-75 in Detroit; M-5 in Detroit; I-94 in Detroit; M-8 near Highland Park; M-102 in Detroit; M-39 in Southfield; I-696 / US 24 in Southfield
- North end: Orchard Lake Road in West Bloomfield Township

Location
- Country: United States
- State: Michigan
- Counties: Wayne, Oakland

Highway system
- Michigan State Trunkline Highway System; Interstate; US; State; Byways
← Bus. US 10	→ M-11
← M-4	M-4	→ M-5

M-10 is a state trunkline highway in the Metro Detroit area of Michigan in the United States. Nominally labeled north-south, the route follows a northwest-southeast alignment. The southernmost portion follows Jefferson Avenue in downtown Detroit, and the southern terminus is at the intersection of Jefferson and M-3 (Randolph Street) next to the entrance to the Detroit–Windsor Tunnel. The northern terminus is in West Bloomfield Township at the intersection with Orchard Lake Road. The highway has several names as it runs through residential and commercial areas of the west side of Detroit and into the suburb of Southfield. It is called the John C. Lodge Freeway (The Lodge), James Couzens Highway, and Northwestern Highway. One segment has also been named the Aretha Franklin Memorial Highway.

M-10 was built in segments through the late 1950s and early 1960s. It carried several different names before the entire route was finally officially named the John C. Lodge Freeway in 1987. The freeway has carried a few other highway designations. The southern segment was part of US Highway 12 (US 12) and the whole road was later renumbered Business Spur Interstate 696 (BS I-696). From 1970 until 1986, it was part of US 10, and the freeway has been M-10 since. The non-freeway segment that runs between I-696 in Southfield and Orchard Lake Road was previously numbered M-4. M-10 was named after John C. Lodge, an influential Detroiter and mayor of Detroit from 1927–28.

== Route description ==
Running about 22.8 miles (36.7 km) in the Metro Detroit area, M-10 runs roughly northwest–southeast from Downtown Detroit into the northern suburbs in Oakland County. The entire length of the highway is listed as a part of the National Highway System, a system of roads importance to the nation's economy, defense and mobility. As a state trunkline highway, the roadway is maintained by the Michigan Department of Transportation (MDOT), and it includes approximately 18.5 miles (29.8 km) of freeway. M-10 has six lanes from Detroit to Inkster Road in Farmington Hills, where it drops to four; a few segments have eight lanes for short distances between interchanges. According to the department, 28,964 vehicles use M-10 on average near on Jefferson Avenue in Detroit, and 139,800 vehicles do so between US 24 (Telegraph Road) and Lahser Road in Southfield, the lowest and highest traffic counts along the highway in 2013, respectively.

=== Detroit ===
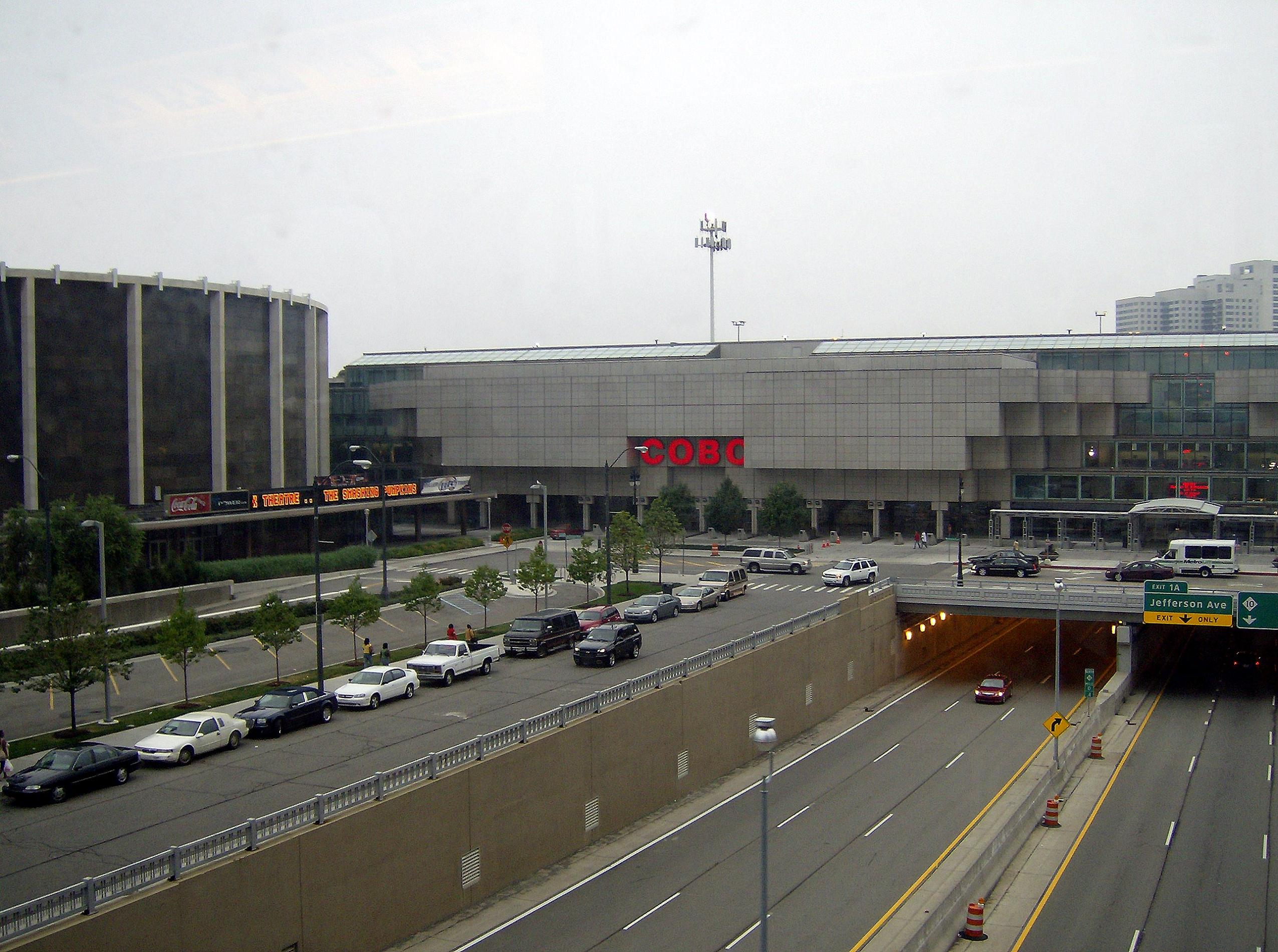
M-10 passing under Cobo Center (now Huntington Place) in 2007

M-10 starts at the corner of Jefferson Avenue and Randolph Street in Downtown Detroit, an intersection that also marks the southern end of M-3 and the western end of Business Spur I-375. This intersection is also the access to the Detroit–Windsor Tunnel between the Renaissance Center and the Old Mariners' Church. From here, M-10 runs west-southwesterly parallel to the Detroit River on Jefferson Avenue past Hart Plaza. At the intersection with Woodward Avenue, M-10 transitions onto the John C. Lodge Freeway, which runs under Huntington Place, home of the North American International Auto Show each January. The freeway turns north-northwesterly and away from the Detroit River next to the former site of Joe Louis Arena. North of this curve, M-10 forms the boundary between Downtown Detroit to the east and the Corktown neighborhood to the west. The freeway has a pair of service drives as it leaves the commercial areas near the MGM Grand Detroit and the interchange with I-75 (Fisher Freeway).

North of I-75, M-10 forms the border between North Corktown (west) and Midtown Detroit (east). The freeway passes the MotorCity Casino at the interchange with M-5 (Grand River Avenue). The rest of its route in this part of the city passes through residential zones. Near the interchange with I-94 (Edsel Ford Freeway), M-10 passes the campus of Wayne State University. M-10 intersects I-94 at the first freeway-to-freeway interchange in the United States. North of I-94, the Lodge Freeway is the border between the West Side and New Center. This area is residential on either side of the freeway north of the campus of the Henry Ford Hospital. North of Clairmount Avenue, M-10 curves to the northwest before resuming its north-northwesterly course near Chicago Boulevard. North of Webb Avenue, the freeway follows the western city limits of Highland Park, an enclave within the city of Detroit. M-10 intersects M-8 where it transitions between Davison Avenue and the Davison Freeway on the western edge of Highland Park before the Lodge Freeway curves around to run due west.

M-10 runs for about two miles (3.2 km) on this due westward course before it intersects Wyoming Avenue and turns northwest. The frontage roads change names from John C. Lodge Service Drive to James Couzens Freeway at the Wyoming Avenue interchange. The freeway continues for another 3 1/2 miles (5.6 km) with interchanges for local streets in this part of Detroit, including 7 Mile Road. At the interchange with M-102 (8 Mile Road), the freeway crosses out of Detroit and Wayne County into Southfield in Oakland County.

=== Oakland County ===
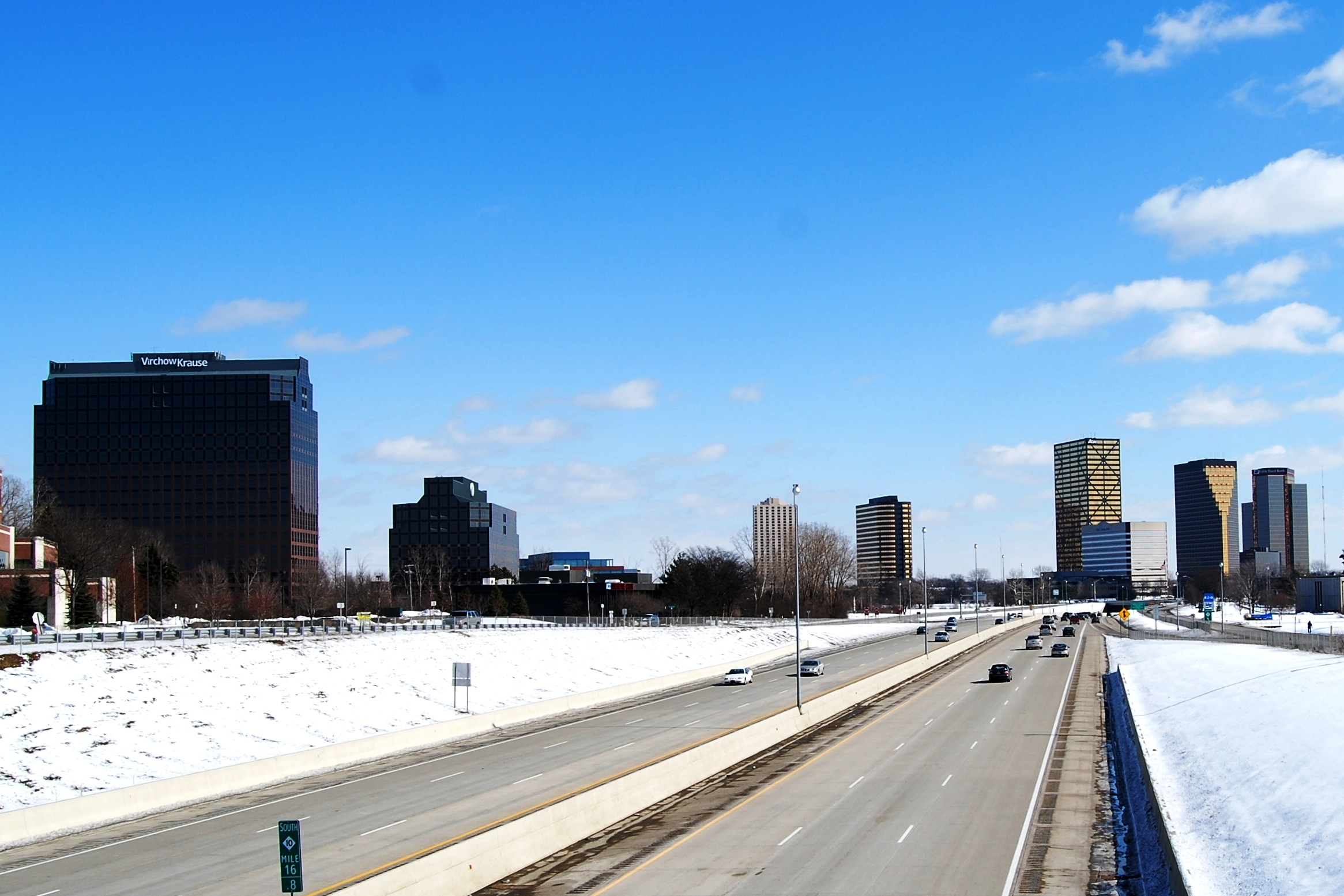
Looking southbound

The service drives change names again to Northwestern Highway upon crossing into Oakland County. The east side of M-10 is flanked by the former Northland Shopping Center and a campus of Oakland Community College; the west side is residential. About 1 1/4 miles (2.0 km) into Southfield, M-10 intersects the northern end of M-39 (Southfield Freeway) and 9 Mile Road. The adjacent properties are mostly residential, but there are some commercial areas centered around the various Mile Roads, such as the campus of Lawrence Technological University at 10 Mile Road. Near Lahser and 11 Mile roads, M-10 meets I-696 (Reuther Freeway) and US 24 (Telegraph Road) in a complex interchange called the Mixing Bowl. This interchange spans over two miles (3.2 km) near the American Center. The carriageways for I-696 run in the median of M-10 while partial interchanges connect to Lahser and Franklin roads on either end of the various ramps that connect to I-696 and US 24.

Northwest of this interchange, M-10 transitions to a boulevard with Michigan lefts. Called just Northwestern Highway, M-10 runs through suburban residential areas of Southfield. At the intersection with Inkster Road, the highway clips the southwest corner of the city of Franklin and enters the northeastern corner of Farmington Hills. The roadway is lined with commercial properties while just behind them are residential subdivisions and two golf courses. At the intersection with 14 Mile Road, Northwestern Highway crosses into West Bloomfield Township, and 1/4 mile (0.40 km) further on, the highway ends at Orchard Lake Road.

== History ==
=== Previous designations ===
M-10
- Location: Ohio state line–Mackinaw City
- Existed: c. July 1, 1919–November 11, 1926

In 1919, the state numbered its highways for the first time. In the initial allocation of numbers, M-10 was assigned to a highway that started at the Ohio state line south of Monroe, ran northeasterly along Telegraph Road into Dearborn and turned easterly into Detroit. From there, the highway turned north along Woodward Avenue through Pontiac and Dixie Highway through Flint and Saginaw to Bay City. Then M-10 ran along the Saginaw Bay to Standish and turned to follow the Lake Huron shoreline, with some substantial deviations inland. The highway generally followed the lakeshore as far north as Alpena and Rogers City, and from there, M-10 ran due west through Onaway before turning north into Cheboygan. The last section of M-10 followed the Lake Huron shoreline to Mackinaw City, where it terminated. This designation lasted until November 11, 1926, when the United States Numbered Highway System was created. In Michigan's initial allocation of highways, four new designations replaced M-10: US 24 from the state line north to Dearborn, US 112 between Dearborn and Detroit, US 10 from Detroit to Saginaw, and US 23 from Saginaw to Mackinaw City. At the time, no M-10 designation was reassigned to any other roads.

M-10
- Location: Grand Blanc–Mt. Morris
- Length: 14.767 mi (23.765 km)
- Existed: 1929–1941

The second iteration of M-10 was designated in 1929 on a much shorter segment of the original M-10 through the Flint area, serving as a business connection for the city as the through route, US 10, bypassed it on the east. It was later redesignated as Business US 10 (Bus. US 10) in 1941, and then as Bus. M-54 in 1962 before being turned back to local control in 1974.

=== Current designation ===
During the 1950s, the Lodge Freeway was proposed to run from Detroit as far as the Fenton–Clio Expressway (US 23) at Fenton and was to play a significant role in the city’s greater plan for urban renewal. Ardent supporters of freeway construction, such as Mayor Albert Cobo, argued that improved access to the city's downtown from the suburbs and outer residential areas would allow for the easy transportation of goods, services, and workers, ultimately bolstering the city's economy. The Lodge Freeway portion carved through mostly white, upper middle class neighborhoods of central and northwestern Detroit as well as economically distressed white areas closer to downtown and the western edge of Detroit's Chinese neighborhood. Although Detroit city planners were careful to not disrupt middle-class White residential areas in construction, they showed little concern for Black neighborhoods, especially those that stood in the way of the main thoroughfare into downtown, which were small. In fact, the destruction of Black communities in many cases was seen to be positive, "a handy device for razing slums". The first three-mile (4.8 km) stretch of the Lodge Freeway leveled large portions of the densely populated Lower West Side, the increasingly Black area bordering Twelfth Street, and a 15-block area of mixed Black and Jewish bordering Highland Park. The construction of the freeway partitioned communities in half and by 1950, 423 single family residences, 109 businesses, 22 manufacturing plants, and 93 vacant lots had been condemned. By 1958, from its terminus in downtown Detroit to Wyoming Ave (about seven miles [11 km]), 2,222 more buildings had been destroyed.

The interchange with the Edsel Ford Freeway, next to Wayne State University, occasionally called the Ford–Lodge interchange, was built in 1953; it was the first full freeway-to-freeway interchange built in the United States. Engineers at the time rejected the conventional design to connect two freeways, the cloverleaf as too hazardous, instead initially preferring a rotary interchange. Such a design would only accommodate 3,000 vehicles per hour, far less than what the Michigan engineers anticipated, so the design was changed to a full interchange, with ramps on both the right and left sides of the roadways. This "right-to-go-right-left-to-go-left" design was considered progressive for its time. The interchange, which cost $15.3 million (equivalent to $139 million in 2024) to build and used 14 bridges to complete its connections, was heralded as an engineering marvel. The interchange opened in stages during 1955. At the time, The Detroit News reported that the rush of traffic created "a haze of concrete dust" as traffic passed through, but by the next day, the interchange was the site of traffic jams and head-on collisions because of bad design, according to the Detroit Free Press.

The freeway was dedicated on November 7, 1957, and opened without any state trunkline designation between downtown and the Wyoming Curve. The section from the Edsel Ford Freeway (now I-94) into downtown Detroit was designated as US 12 by the middle of 1960.

Between September 5 and December 5, 1961, the Lodge Freeway's partial interchange with Greenlawn Avenue was closed on a 90-day trial basis, due to concerns from local citizens over an exit leading directly into a residential area. When the trial basis expired, the Detroit Streets and Traffic Commission ruled to keep the ramps permanently closed.

Business Spur Interstate 696
- Location: Detroit–Southfield
- Length: 17.538 mi (28.225 km)
- Existed: 1962–1970

The freeway was then redesignated Business Spur I-696 (BS I-696) in 1962, and the next year the freeway was extended northwesterly along James Couzens Highway and Northwestern Highway into Southfield, connecting with the completed first phase of I-696 that opened in 1963-64. That designation remained until 1970 when US 10 was shifted off Woodward Avenue to follow the Lodge Freeway between downtown Detroit and Telegraph Road, replacing the BS I-696 designation.

M-4
- Location: Farmington Hills–Southfield
- Length: 4.687 mi (7.543 km)
- Existed: 1979–1986

An extension to the Northwestern Highway was again proposed in 1966 to connect with the proposed I-275 extension. The I-275 project was then cancelled in 1977. The section of Northwestern Highway under state control between the West Bloomfield Township–Farmington Hills border into Southfield was numbered M-4 in 1979.

The Michigan Department of Transportation (MDOT) petitioned the American Association of State Highway and Transportation Officials in the mid-1980s to truncate US 10 to Bay City. The request was approved on October 11, 1985, and the signage was changed the next year. After the change, the Lodge Freeway was redesignated M-10. The non-freeway Northwestern Highway, until then designated M-4, was also renumbered as M-10. The southernmost portion of the Lodge Freeway was also initially redesignated as a portion of BS I-375 from I-75 south. By the next year however, the southern end of M-10 was moved to the corner of Jefferson and Randolph, placing all of the Lodge Freeway as part of M-10.

From 2006 to 2007, the Lodge underwent major reconstruction to ease traffic congestion in the metro area, temporarily closing down much of the freeway. The $133 million project (equivalent to $193 million in 2024) included concrete pavement reconstruction and rehabilitation, new barrier walls, repairs or replacements to 50 bridges, upgrades to 22 ramps, utility upgrades, and replacement of freeway signs between Lahser Road in Southfield and Jefferson Avenue in Detroit.

== Memorial highway names ==
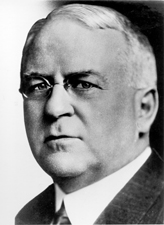
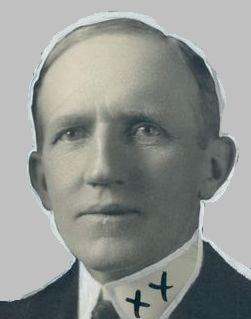
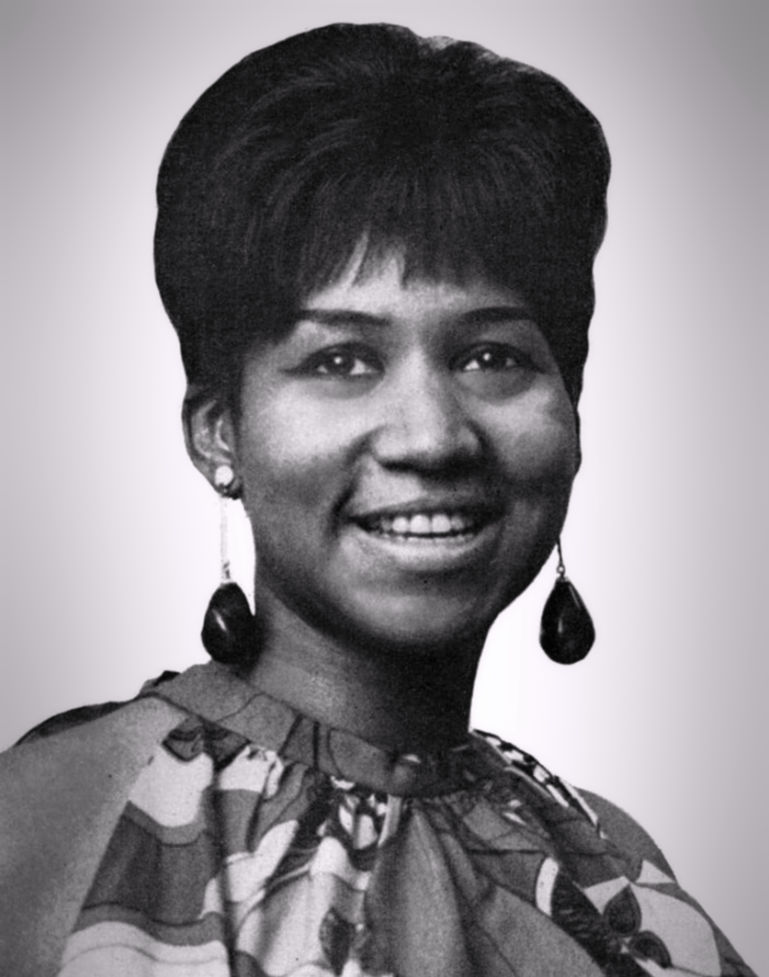
James J. Couzens (left), John C. Lodge (center), and Aretha Franklin (right) have been namesakes for parts of M-10 in Detroit

Starting in 1924, officials in southeastern Michigan proposed building a highway from Detroit to run northwesterly across the state to Ludington, bisecting the angle created by Woodward and Grand River avenues. This roadway was named Northwestern Highway when it was built in 1929 to an endpoint at 14 Mile Road. Further construction on Northwestern Highway was halted by the Great Depression.

The freeway segment northwest of Wyoming Avenue to the county line was previously known as James Couzens Highway after the street it replaced. That street was named after the death of James J. Couzens. Couzens was a former Commissioner of Detroit's Department of Street Railways from 1913 through 1915, after which he served as Police Commissioner from 1916 until 1918. He was Mayor of Detroit from 1919 until 1922 and United States Senator from Michigan from 1922 until his death on October 22, 1936. During his years of public service, he is said not to have accepted a salary, giving it all to charity. After his death, Detroit renamed its section of Northwestern Highway after Couzens.

John C. Lodge was a member of the constitutional convention which drafted the Michigan Constitution of 1908, a former member of the Michigan Legislature and Detroit alderman and councilman. He later served as Mayor of Detroit in 1918–1919 before returned to the City Common Council from 1932 to 1947. He was then elected to the Wayne County Board of Supervisors from 1948 until 1950. In total, he held elective office longer than anyone in city history. He died on February 6, 1950, and the future Lodge Freeway was named in his honor on January 20, 1953. The entire freeway, including segments previously named for James Couzens and the Northwestern Highway was named the John C. Lodge Freeway in 1987, although the service drives retained their original names.

In 2019, the section between Livernois and I-94 was named the Aretha Franklin Memorial Highway after Detroit native Aretha Franklin. The singer, who died the previous year, got her start in Detroit singing at a local church before embarking on a six-decade career that earned her 18 Grammy Awards. She was the first woman to be inducted into the Rock and Roll Hall of Fame in 1987 and received the National Medal of Arts (1999), the Kennedy Center Honors (1994) and the Presidential Medal of Freedom (2005). Franklin was also an activist in the Civil Rights Movement.

== Exit list ==
County	Location	mi	km	Exit	Destinations	Notes
Wayne	Detroit	0.000	0.000		Jefferson Avenue east (BS I-375 north) M-3 north (Randolph Street); Detroit–Windsor Tunnel – Canada	Southern termini of M-10, M-3 and unsigned BS I-375; Jefferson Avenue continues east as unsigned BS I-375
Wayne	Detroit	0.590– 0.722	0.950– 1.162	1B	Larned Street – Downtown	Southern end of freeway; southbound left exit and northbound entrance
Wayne	Detroit	0.590– 0.722	0.950– 1.162	1A	West Jefferson Avenue – Joe Louis Arena	Left exit northbound; no northbound entrance; to Joe Louis Parking Center and Riverfront Apartments
Wayne	Detroit	1.131	1.820	1C	Howard Street – Downtown	Southbound exit and northbound entrance
Wayne	Detroit	1.533	2.467	2B	Bagley Avenue	Southbound left exit and northbound left entrance
Wayne	Detroit	1.775	2.857	—	Vernor Highway	Interchange removed for construction of I-75 interchange
Wayne	Detroit	1.775	2.857	2A	I-75 (Fisher Freeway) – Flint, Toledo	Exit 49 on I-75; includes direct southbound exit and northbound, southbound entrance ramps for Trumbull Avenue; ramps to I-75 southbound also directly connect to I-96
Wayne	Detroit	2.052	3.302	2C	M-5 (Grand River Avenue)	Southbound exit and northbound entrance
Wayne	Detroit	2.919	4.698	3	Forest Avenue, Warren Avenue	
Wayne	Detroit	3.127	5.032	4	I-94 (Edsel Ford Freeway) – Port Huron, Chicago	Signed as exits 4A (east) and 4B (west); exit 215 on I-94
Wayne	Detroit	3.737	6.014	4C	Milwaukee Avenue, West Grand Boulevard	Southbound signed as West Grand Boulevard only
Wayne	Detroit	4.332	6.972	5A	Pallister Avenue	Southbound exit and northbound entrance
Wayne	Detroit	4.751	7.646	5B	Clairmount Avenue	Northbound exit and southbound entrance
Wayne	Detroit	5.391	8.676	5C	Hamilton Avenue, Chicago Boulevard	Hamilton Avenue signed northbound only
Wayne	Detroit	5.652	9.096	6A	Webb Avenue	No southbound exit
Wayne	Detroit	6.051	9.738	6B	Elmhurst Avenue	Southbound exit only; closed 2021
Wayne	Detroit	6.194	9.968	7A	Glendale Avenue	Northbound exit and southbound entrance
Wayne	Detroit–Highland Park city line	6.406– 6.777	10.309– 10.907	7	M-8 (Davison Freeway)	Signed as exits 7B (east) and 7C (west) northbound and 7B (east) southbound; no access from southbound M-10 to westbound M-8 or eastbound M-8 to northbound M-10
Wayne	Detroit	7.453	11.994	8	Linwood Avenue	
Wayne	Detroit	8.107	13.047	9	Livernois Avenue	
Wayne	Detroit	7.571	12.184	—	Greenlawn Avenue	Former northbound exit and southbound entrance; ramps closed 1961
Wayne	Detroit	9.146	14.719	10	Wyoming Avenue	
Wayne	Detroit	9.868	15.881	11	Meyers Road, McNichols Road	Northbound exit and southbound entrance
Wayne	Detroit	11.337	18.245	12	7 Mile Road	
Wayne–Oakland county line	Detroit–Southfield city line	12.872	20.715	13	M-102 (8 Mile Road) / Greenfield Road	8 Mile Road is the city and county line
Oakland	Southfield	13.817	22.236	14	9 Mile Road, Northland Center	Signed as exits 14A (Northland) and 14B (9 Mile Road); complete access to Northland Center, no entrances from 9 Mile Road; 14B exit is north of 14C southbound; 14A and 14B ramps are combined northbound
Oakland	Southfield	14.310	23.030	14C	M-39 south (Southfield Freeway); Southfield Road	Exit 16 on M-39; signed as Southfield Road northbound only; directional access (northbound to northbound or southbound to southbound) only; northern terminus of M-39
Oakland	Southfield	15.629	25.152	15	Evergreen Road, 10 Mile Road	
Oakland	Southfield	16.787	27.016	16	Lahser Road	Northbound access to eastbound I-696
Oakland	Southfield	17.538	28.225	17	I-696 east (Reuther Freeway) – Port Huron	Exit 10 on I-696; southbound left exit and northbound entrance
Oakland	Southfield	18.194	29.280	18	US 24 (Telegraph Road) – Dearborn, Pontiac	Signed as exits 18A (north) and 18B (south); I-696 is located in the median of M-10
Oakland	Southfield	18.562	29.873	18C	I-696 west (Reuther Freeway) – Lansing	Exit 8 on I-696; northbound left exit and southbound entrance; north end of freeway
Oakland	West Bloomfield Township	22.881	36.823		Orchard Lake Road north	Northern terminus
1.000 mi = 1.609 km; 1.000 km = 0.621 mi: Closed/former; Incomplete access
