= M-153 (Michigan highway) =

State highway in Washtenaw and Wayne counties in Michigan, United States

M-153
- Ford Road
- M-153 highlighted in red

Route information
- Maintained by MDOT
- Length: 25.127 mi (40.438 km)
- Existed: December 2, 1930–present

Major junctions
- West end: M-14 near Ann Arbor
- I-275 in Canton; US 24 in Dearborn; M-39 in Dearborn
- East end: I-94 / US 12 at Detroit western city line

Location
- Country: United States
- State: Michigan
- Counties: Washtenaw, Wayne

Highway system
- Michigan State Trunkline Highway System; Interstate; US; State; Byways
← M-152	→ M-154

M-153 is an east–west state trunkline highway in the Metro Detroit area of the US state of Michigan. It is also known as Ford Road for nearly its entire length, except for its westernmost portion where the highway follows a short expressway to M-14. Named for William Ford, father of Henry Ford, Ford Road runs from near Dixboro to the Dearborn–Detroit border. The M-153 designation continues along Wyoming Avenue where it terminates at a junction with Interstate 94 (I-94) and US Highway 12 (US 12) on the city line.

Ford Road has been a part of the state highway system since December 2, 1930. Since the state has maintained the roadway as M-153, it has been extended westward from Wayne County into Washtenaw County and upgraded in sections to expressway conditions. The first of these improvements were made in the 1930s with additional upgrades in the 1960s and 1970s. The last change was made by 1980 to create the modern routing.

== Route description ==
M-153 starts at a trumpet interchange with M-14's exit 10 in Superior Township east of Ann Arbor. The highway starts as a four-lane divided expressway curving southeasterly to meet Ford Road near Frains Lake Road. Ford Road continues as a local road west of here to end at Plymouth Road south of the M-14 freeway. At Frains Lake Road, M-153 narrows to a two-lane undivided road, passing through rural areas until the Washtenaw–Wayne county line at Napier Road, where it enters Canton.

In Canton, M-153 initially runs through a residential area, widening to five lanes west of Beck Road. Retail stores line the corridor by the time it reaches Canton Center Road. The segment of M-153 between Canton Center and I-275 is Canton's main commercial corridor, and one of the busiest corridors in Detroit's western suburbs. Numerous strip malls and retail stores line the corridor, and it widens to seven lanes near Haggerty Road. M-153 meets I-275 at the east end of Canton, at a partial cloverleaf interchange built over the western crossing of Willow Creek, a tributary of the River Rouge. M-153 then narrows back to five lanes as it crosses into Westland between Lotz and Hix roads.

Just after entering Westland, an overpass carries M-153 over a railroad track, flanked on either side by an at-grade frontage road. Ford Road continues east, forming a section of the Garden City boundary near Venoy Road. The trunkline crosses into Dearborn Heights at Inkster Road. It forms the boundary between Dearborn and Dearborn Heights between Gulley and Evergreen roads, crossing US 24 (Telegraph Road) in between. East of Telegraph Road, M-153 is built to expressway standards complete with interchanges at Edward N. Hines Drive, Evergreen Road, M-39 (Southfield Freeway) and Greenfield Road. The highway crosses the River Rouge north of the Dearborn Country Club west of Evergreen Road. Ford Road ends at Wyoming and McGraw avenues. M-153 turns south along Wyoming Avenue to cross I-94 at exit 210. This interchange is also the location where I-94 and US 12 (Michigan Avenue) cross, marking the eastern end of M-153 at Michigan Avenue.

Ford Road serves as the zero-mile line for the Detroit area's Mile Road System, though it is rarely referred to as such, nor is any other road south of 5 Mile on the grid. From the Canton Center Road intersection eastward, all of M-153 is a part of the National Highway System. M-153 is maintained by the Michigan Department of Transportation (MDOT) like other state highways in Michigan. As a part of these maintenance responsibilities, the department tracks the volume of traffic that uses the roadways under its jurisdiction. MDOT's surveys in 2010 showed that the highest traffic levels along M-153 were the 64,956 vehicles daily between the River Rouge and the Southfield Freeway in Dearborn, on average; the lowest counts were the 10,380 vehicles per day between Plymouth Road and the end of the expressway in Superior Township.

== History ==
Ford Road was named for William Ford, father of automobile pioneer Henry Ford. The elder Ford was born in Ireland and settled in Dearborn Township in 1847. William's carpentry business lead him around to regional businesses and neighbors, traveling the area until he took up the family business of farming after marriage to Mary Litogot. They settled on a farm near the intersection of modern-day Ford Road and Greenfield Avenue; this farm was Henry's birthplace in 1863. Settling into his family life, William started serving the local community. He was a road commissioner, school board member and a justice of the peace. In honor of his accomplishments, Ford Road was named in his honor before his death in March 1905.

Ford Road remained in township jurisdiction until August 29, 1924, when it was transferred to Wayne County control. It was transferred to state control on December 2, 1930. The Michigan State Highway Department designated it M-153 upon transfer to their responsibility. The highway designation was determined to continue west of the county line into Washtenaw County as a northerly bypass of Ann Arbor, but the segment between Canton Center Road and US 12 on Plymouth Road was not built at the time. The first extension west was finished in 1933 from the county line to Napier Road. The road was widened into a major thoroughfare between Detroit and Ann Arbor in 1934, to relieve congestion on Michigan Avenue. The highway bypass of Ann Arbor was cancelled by 1935, leaving the western terminus at US 12 (Plymouth Road).

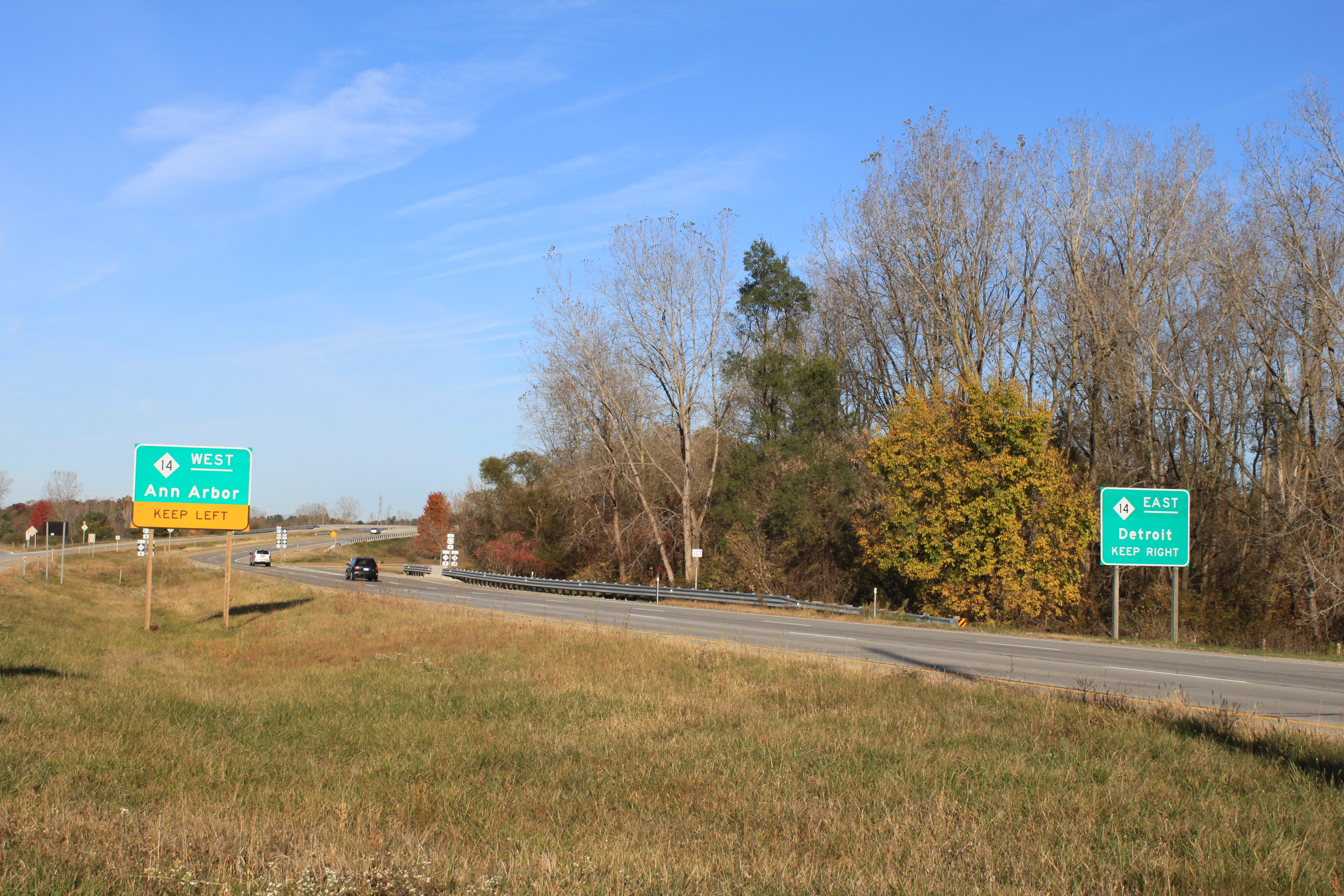
Intersection of M-153 and M-14, facing west viewed from intersection at Plymouth Road

Construction of a northerly freeway bypass of Ann Arbor along M-14 to M-153 was completed by 1965. A second freeway section was built between Ford Road at Frains Lake Road to the contemporary end of the M-14 freeway. This second freeway was assigned as part of M-153 and the former routing along Ford Road west to Plymouth Road was removed from the state trunkline highway system. A reconstruction project along M-153 in Dearborn in 1973 was completed, bringing that section of the highway up to expressway standards. Several interchanges were built along the segment including Hines Drive, Evergreen Road, M-39 (Southfield Freeway) and Greenfield Road. The last extension moved the western terminus in early 1980 when the M-14 freeway was completed, and M-153 was extended along a section of freeway used to connect the previous end of the M-14 freeway to Plymouth Road.

== Major intersections ==
All exits are unnumbered.

County	Location	mi	km	Destinations	Notes
Washtenaw	Superior Township	0.000	0.000	M-14 – Ann Arbor, Detroit	Exit 10 on M-14
Wayne	Canton	10.337	16.636	I-275 – Flint, Toledo	Exit 25 on I-275
Wayne	Dearborn	14.005	22.539	US 24 (Telegraph Road)	
Wayne	Dearborn	15.404	24.790	Edward N. Hines Drive north	Westbound exit and eastbound entrance
Wayne	Dearborn	15.967	25.696	Evergreen Road	Interchange
Wayne	Dearborn	19.012	30.597	M-39 (Southfield Freeway)	Exit 7 on M-39
Wayne	Dearborn	17.963	28.909	Greenfield Road	Interchange
Wayne	Dearborn–Detroit city line	25.050– 25.127	40.314– 40.438	I-94 – Detroit, Chicago; US 12 (Michigan Avenue)	Exit 210 on I-94
1.000 mi = 1.609 km; 1.000 km = 0.621 mi
