= Capitol Loop =

Former state highway in Lansing, Michigan, United States

Capitol Loop
- Capitol Loop I-496 (CL I-496), Connector 496
- Capitol Loop highlighted in red

Route information
- Auxiliary route of I-496
- Maintained by MDOT
- Length: 2.398 mi (3.859 km) Eastbound length is 2.088 mi (3.360 km); Westbound length is 2.398 mi (3.859 km)
- Existed: October 13, 1989–March 26, 2024
- History: Proposed in 1986
- NHS: Entire route

Major junctions
- West end: I-496 / M-99 in Lansing
- BL I-96 in Lansing
- East end: I-496 / BL I-96 in Lansing

Location
- Country: United States
- State: Michigan
- Counties: Ingham

Highway system
- Michigan State Trunkline Highway System; Interstate; US; State; Byways
← I-496	→ M-553

The Capitol Loop was a state trunkline highway running through Lansing, Michigan, in the United States that was commissioned on October 13, 1989. It formed a loop route off Interstate 496 (I-496) through downtown near the Michigan State Capitol complex, home of the state legislature and several state departments. The Michigan Department of Transportation (MDOT) had labeled it as Capitol Loop I-496 or CL I-496 on some maps, similar to the Business Loop Interstate nomenclature. However, unlike other business loops in Michigan, it had unique reassurance markers—the signs that served as regular reminders of the name and number of the highway. It was known internally at MDOT as Connector 496 for inventory purposes. (Note: It was previously known internally as Connector 81.) The route followed a series of one-way and two-way streets through downtown Lansing, directing traffic downtown to the State Capitol and other government buildings. Unlike the other streets downtown, the seven streets comprising the Capitol Loop were under state maintenance and jurisdiction.

The loop was originally proposed in 1986 as part of a downtown revitalization effort. Almost from the beginning before the highway was commissioned in 1989, it was affected by controversial proposals. Several suggestions by community leaders to rename city streets in honor of Martin Luther King Jr. were rejected. In the end, Logan Street was given a second name, Martin Luther King Jr. Boulevard, and the original name was eventually dropped.

Meetings beginning in 1999 dealt with rebuilding the streets as part of a downtown beautification project. The project was delayed to accommodate replacing the sewer system under the roadway at the same time as the streetscaping. The downtown business community protested the original scope of construction, and the Lansing City Council threatened to cancel the project in response to the controversy. Instead of losing the investment in the downtown area, the scope of the project was reduced in scale, and the project was completed in 2005, three months ahead of schedule. In 2010, additional controversies surfaced regarding the posting and enforcement of speed limits on city streets in Michigan, including the streets that make up the Capitol Loop. A newer controversy over speed limits was related to compliance with a 2006 state law aimed at eliminating speed traps. The designation was decommissioned on March 26, 2024, when MDOT transferred jurisdiction over the trunkline to the city, which planned to convert the one-way segments to two-way traffic.

== Route description ==
The Capitol Loop served as a connection between the other state highways in Lansing and the Michigan State Capitol complex. The trunkline started at the northern end of M-99 at exit 5 on I-496. It ran north on Martin Luther King Jr. Boulevard, where the street is divided into north- and south-bound sections, each three lanes wide, separated by the Union Missionary Baptist Church off St. Joseph Street. A block north of the church, the sections of the street are divided by a central median north of Lenawee Street.

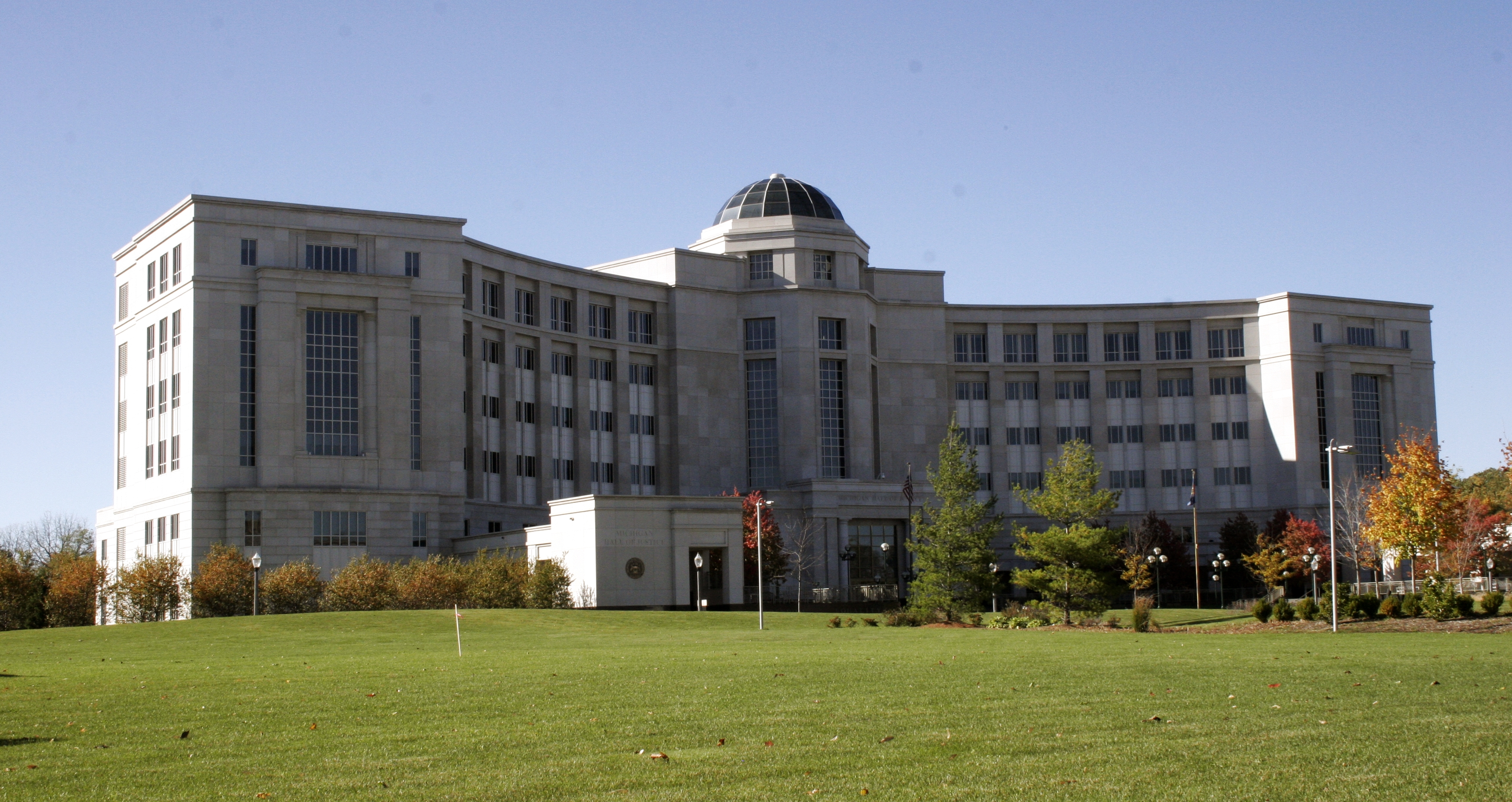
The Hall of Justice is home to the Michigan Supreme Court at the west end of the Capitol Loop.

At Allegan Street, the Capitol Loop became a one-way pair. Eastbound traffic continued on Allegan Street, passing to the south of the Hall of Justice, home to the Michigan Supreme Court. Westbound traffic was carried on Ottawa Street, one block to the north of Allegan Street. The Hall faces Butler Boulevard, which provides access from Allegan and Ottawa streets. Past Butler Boulevard, traffic passed the north side of the Library of Michigan and Historical Center complex. Between Pine Street and Capitol Avenue, Allegan Street continues south of the Michigan State Capitol. Allegan Street ends at a one-way street, Grand Avenue, and eastbound Capitol Loop turned north on this three-lane street.

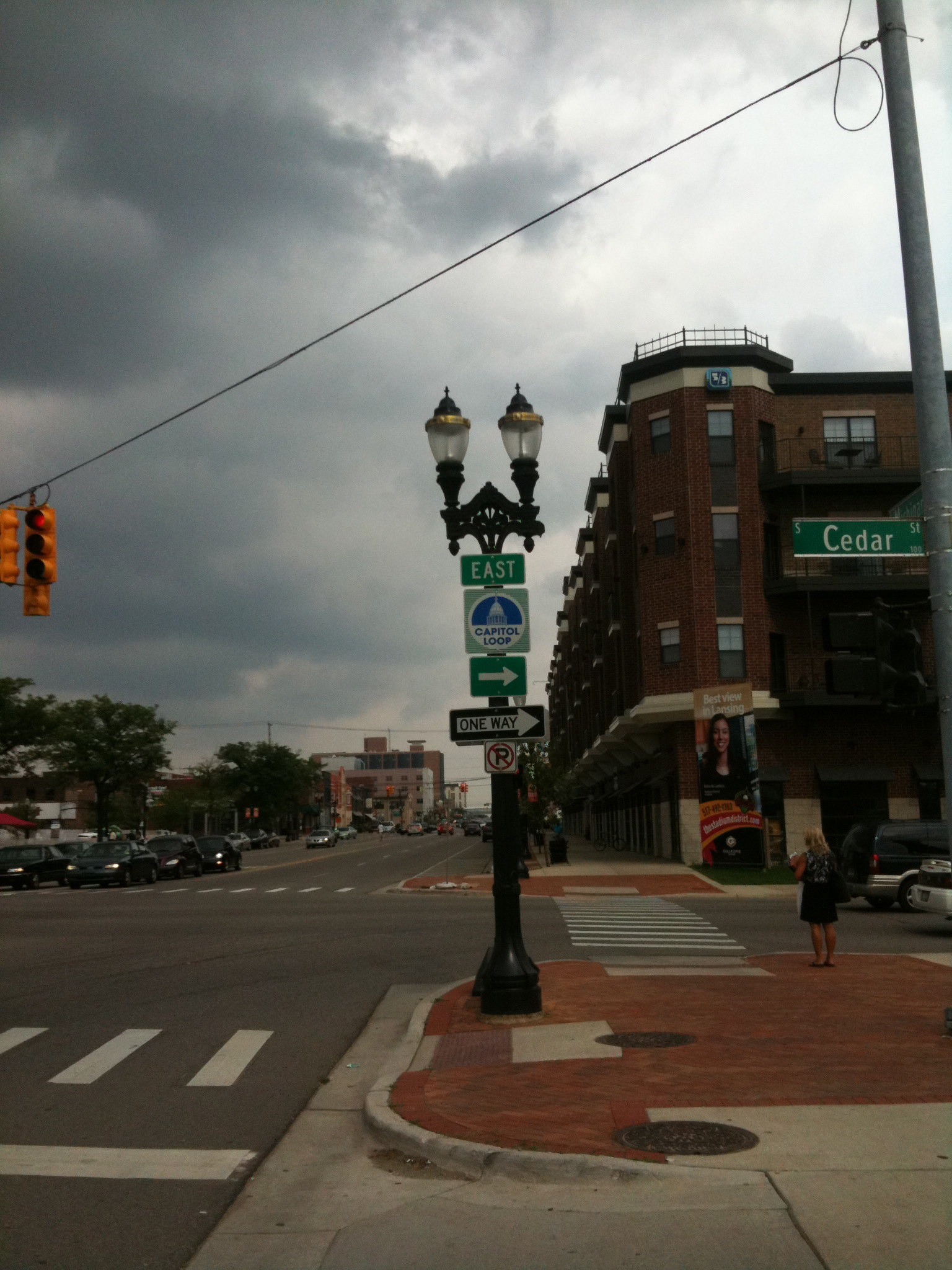
A reassurance marker at the corner of Michigan Avenue and Cedar Street

The two directions of traffic on the Capitol Loop were reunited at the two-way Michigan Avenue. Eastbound traffic turned east along Michigan Avenue; westbound traffic turned north off Michigan onto Grand Avenue. Michigan Avenue runs with two lanes in each direction and a center turn lane, crossing the Grand River. East of the river, it approaches a complex of museums on Museum Drive, including the Michigan Museum of Surveying, R.E. Olds Transportation Museum (named for Oldsmobile founder, R.E. Olds) and the Impression Five Science Museum south of Riverwalk Park.

The Capitol Loop met the one-way pairing of Cedar and Larch streets on Michigan Avenue near Cooley Law School Stadium, home of the Lansing Lugnuts minor league baseball team. Cedar and Larch carry Business Loop Interstate 96 (BL I-96). The two highway designations merged and ran concurrently along the pair of streets. Eastbound Capitol Loop and eastbound BL I-96 followed Cedar Street southerly; westbound Capitol Loop and westbound BL I-96 were routed northerly on Larch Street. Cedar Street runs southeasterly along the Grand River angling toward Larch Street. The two streets merge where they meet I-496. This interchange at exit 7 along I-496 marked the eastern end of the Capitol Loop, but BL I-96 continues south of I-496 on Cedar Street. All the Capitol Loop is included on the National Highway System, a system of roads important to the country's economy, defense, and mobility.

=== Traffic counts ===
In 2022, MDOT conducted one of its annual surveys to measure the traffic levels on Michigan trunklines. These surveys calculate the average annual daily traffic (AADT), which is a computation of the average traffic levels for a segment of roadway on any given day of the year. Along the Capitol Loop, the highest traffic counts were measured on Martin Luther King Jr. Boulevard. A daily average of 20,476 vehicles used that section of the route. This figure included an AADT of 697 commercial vehicles. Traffic volume drops along Allegan and Ottawa streets, where 2,577 and 1,253 vehicles used those streets, including 116 and 56 commercial vehicles, respectively.

== History ==
=== Proposal and creation ===
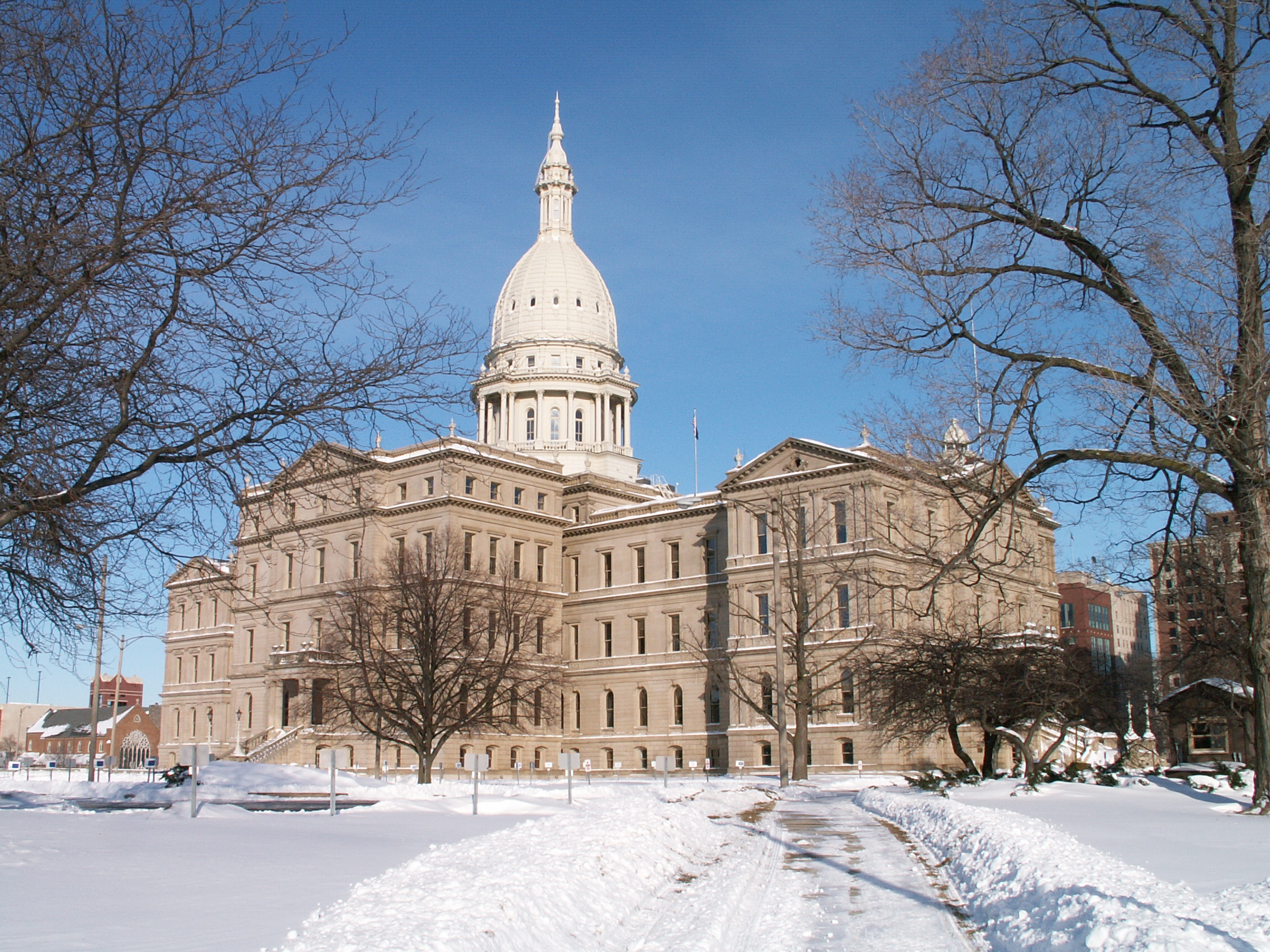
The Michigan State Capitol in Lansing near the Capitol Loop

MDOT proposed the Capitol Loop in 1986. The highway designation was part of a partnership between the State of Michigan and the City of Lansing to revitalize the downtown area. The designation of this highway provided drivers with a signed route to various attractions in the downtown Lansing area. MDOT started implementing plans for the Capitol Loop in May 1986 with improvements to Michigan Avenue. This project included an initial $80,000 investment (equivalent to $194,000 in 2024) to streetscaping between the State Capitol and the Grand River. The City of Lansing transferred jurisdiction over the streets involved to MDOT on October 13, 1989, allowing the state to commission the trunkline.

The route serves the Capitol Park, which was created by an act of the Michigan Legislature in 1984 with the boundaries of Ottawa, Allegan and Logan streets. The fourth side is the vacated section of Sycamore Street between Ottawa and Allegan. The current Library of Michigan building was opened in 1989. The State Capitol, previously listed on the National Register of Historic Places on January 25, 1971, was renovated as part of this revitalization effort. The extensive, three-year renovation of the Capitol was completed in 1992, the same year in which it was designated as a National Historic Landmark. The Hall of Justice was opened in October 2002, giving the Michigan Supreme Court a permanent home for the first time since the court had vacated the Capitol in 1970.

=== Street name changes ===
Various proposals to honor Martin Luther King Jr. in Lansing were floated around 1986. The Pastor's Conference of Lansing put forward renaming Logan Street in honor of the civil rights leader, but residents were not supportive of this idea at the time. Another proposal in October 1988 would have renamed Allegan Street because it was shorter and would affect fewer residents. Allegan Street also passes through the city's black community. Residents objected because the city's east–west streets were all named for the counties in the state when the city was platted in 1847. The last failed proposal would have renamed the entire Capitol Loop in King's honor. This idea failed because the route's unique markers had already been designed, made and were about to be installed.

The conference proposed renaming Logan Street again in 1989. This time residents objected over the $32,000 (equivalent to $70,000 in 2024) to replace the signs. Logan Street was already named for Gen. John A. Logan, who served as a colonel with a Michigan regiment and later as a general in the American Civil War. A compromise by the mayor was adopted by the city council on April 24, 1989, to allow both names to be used on the street. This dual-naming arrangement was dropped by the city council on March 28, 1994, removing the "Logan Street" name from the street after two years of debate.

=== Reconstruction controversy ===
Officials from the City of Lansing and MDOT announced a two-year, $22 million project (in 2003, equivalent to $35.8 million in 2024) to reconstruct the Capitol Loop on May 22, 2003. The project would have closed downtown streets in 2004 and 2005 after preparatory work in late 2003. MDOT was seeking to rebuild the streets to improve the downtown area around the State Capitol, adding decorative sidewalks, lighting and planting new trees. The city planned to upgrade the sewer system at the same time as part of a 30-year project to separate the storm and sanitary sewers. MDOT stated that the project would completely close streets along the loop, with the exception of one lane of traffic in each direction along Michigan Avenue. The project was called the "most ambitious since the Interstate 496 construction project in 2001" by the Lansing State Journal.

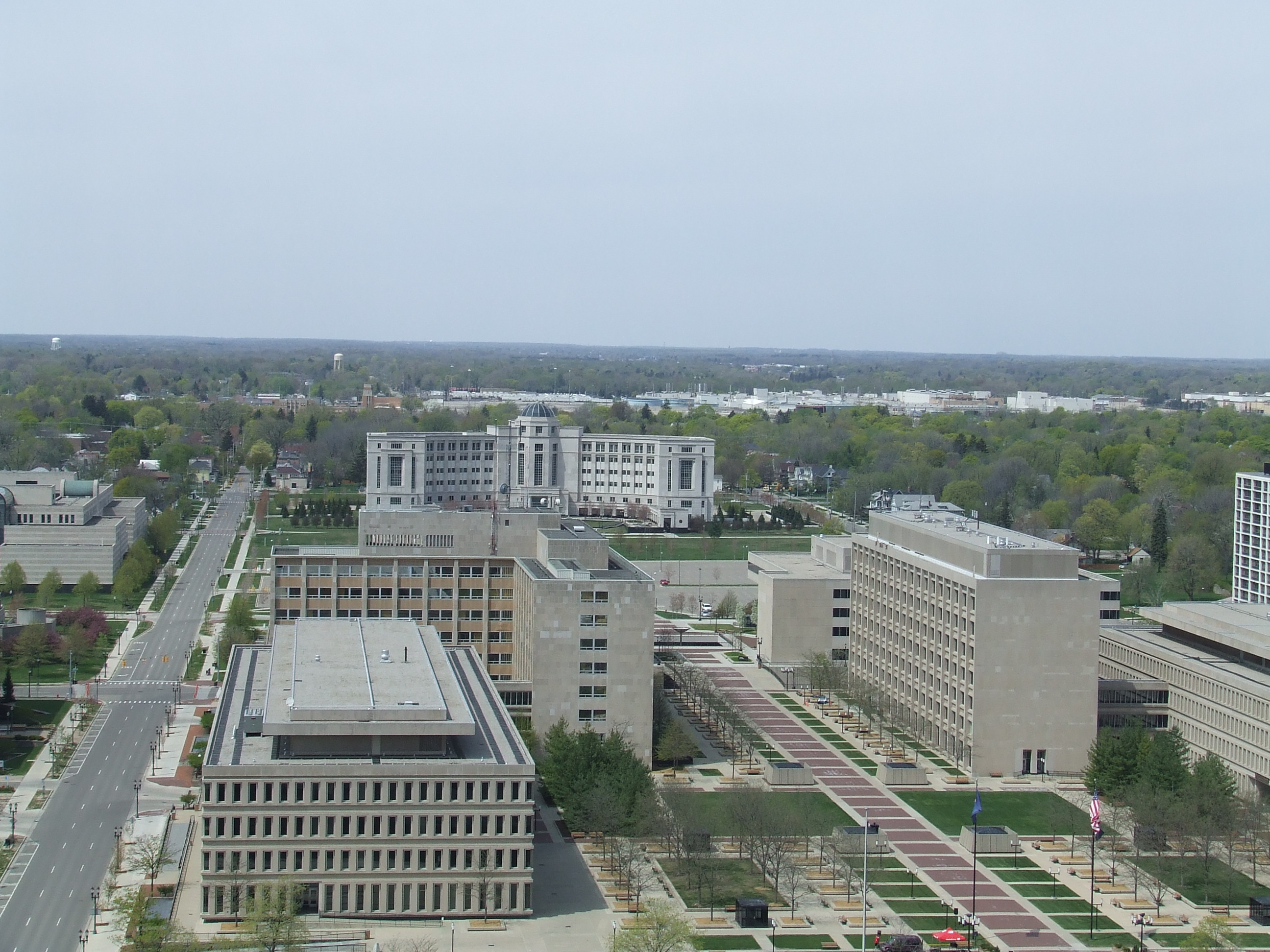
Looking west from the top of the Boji Tower showing Allegan Street and the state government office buildings complex between halves of the Capitol Loop

In the weeks leading up to the November 3, 2003, Lansing City Council meeting, businesses that would be affected by the project raised objections to the scope of the project. One business owner circulated a petition signed by 23 businesses asking the city to delay part of the overall project. The project was nicknamed in the press "Lansing's 'Big Dig'" because the sewer and utility work required 30-foot (9.14 m) excavations in the streets downtown. Some initial opposition was based on a false assumption that the project would close the entire length of the streets at once, instead of in stages. MDOT's original beautification project was delayed five years, and the city's mandated sewer separation project was fast-tracked. This combined project, planned for 2004–2005, was planned to prevent digging up the same streets twice within 10–15 years. Most of the business owners expressed concerns that at the end of the project their businesses might not survive to enjoy the benefits of the downtown beautification. The mayor attempted to get the city council to postpone a vote to stop the issuance of bonds for the city's portion of the overall project. City council members criticized MDOT's "[inflexibility] about changing the plans to accommodate businesses." MDOT replied that the contract bids were already out and that it was too late to change the scope of the project.

The city council tabled the project, postponing a final decision on approving it until the businesses' concerns could be addressed. City officials stated a need to redesign the project to accommodate the business community downtown. The project was originally planned in 1999 with votes and hearings by the city council starting in 2001. The city did not kill the project outright which would have risked the city losing the investment in the downtown infrastructure. Instead, the final decision was delayed for two weeks. Had the project been killed outright, MDOT could have reallocated the funding to any project elsewhere in the state. After the decision to delay the project, Mayor Tony Benavides appointed a task force to work with the businesses to address their concerns. Even the local papers pushed all parties concerned to solve the issues and salvage the project. The city announced a revised plan on November 19, 2003, to move parts of the sewer project to a separate timeline so that they would take 16 years to complete. The original 2004–2005 project was scaled down to encompass the sewer and water main work with the beautification project on Ottawa, Allegan, Pine and Walnut streets with additional work possible on Capitol Avenue. The revised plan drew praise from members of the business community. The revised project, now budgeted at $12 million (in 2003, equivalent to $19.6 million in 2024) involved work on 14 fewer blocks of the downtown area. The project was approved on December 13, 2004. The bids on the contract work were opened on January 21, 2004, with the bid awarded to E.T. MacKenzie Company of Grand Ledge.

=== Reconstruction project ===
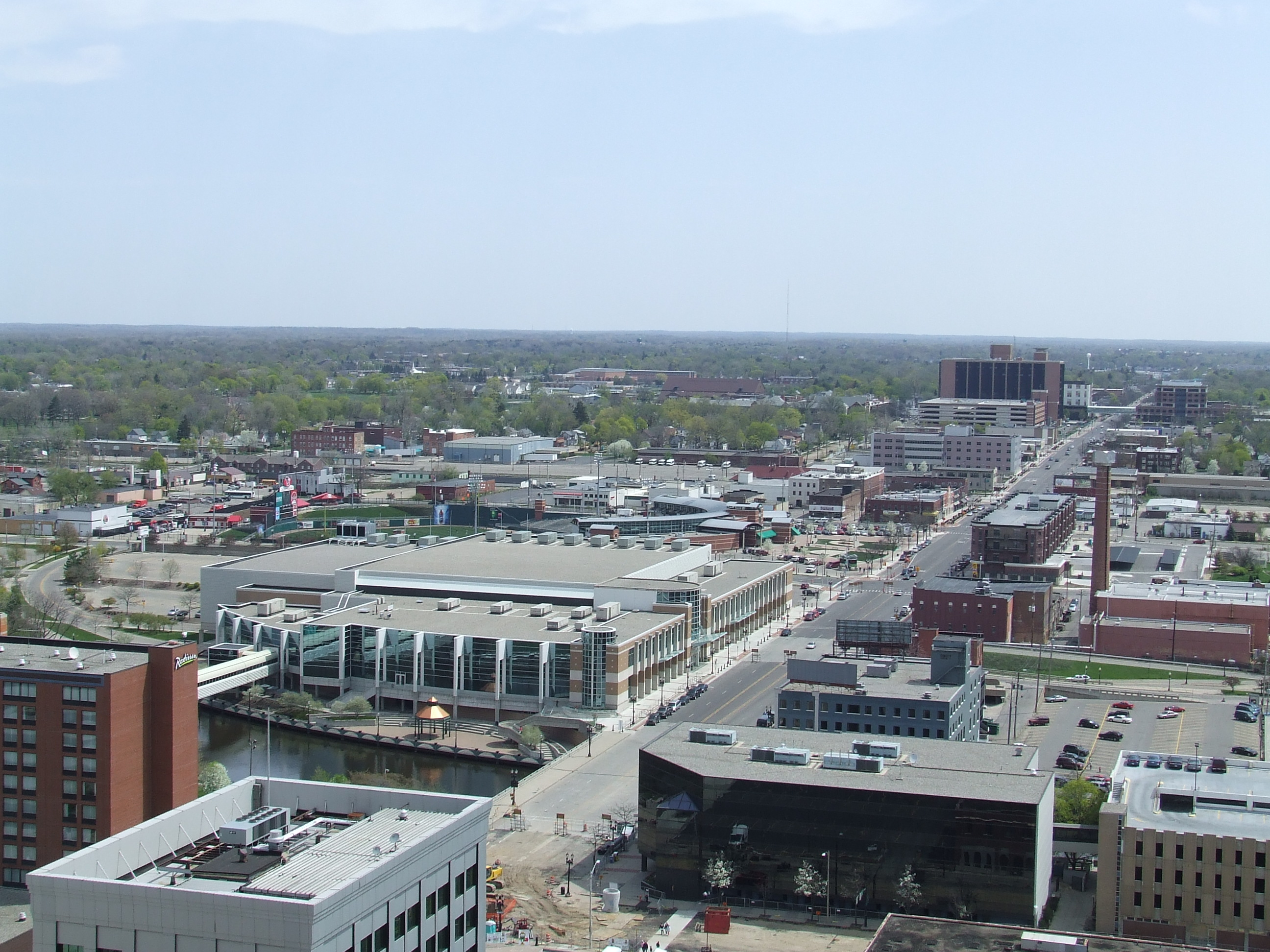
Looking east from the top of the Boji Tower showing construction on the corner of Michigan and Grand avenues

Work on the scaled-down Capitol Loop reconstruction project started on April 5, 2004. Area businesses prepared in advance of the project for disruptions. The Michigan Supreme Court distributed color-coded brochures to alert employees of changes as a result of the project. The Central Methodist Church at the corner of Capitol Avenue and Ottawa Street lost access to its parking lot, but the city reserved on-street parking for parishioners. The initial stage of the project closed Ottawa Avenue in stages and converted adjacent one-way streets to two-way traffic to accommodate state employees working next to the construction zone. Several sidewalks were closed on one side of affected streets, while the opposite sidewalks remained open. The revised project earned praise in newspaper editorials after construction started. This praise was tempered with caution to motorists and the officials in charge of the project. The former were advised to remember that the scaled-down project was redesigned to accommodate them; the latter were reminded to get the job done as soon as practical.

Business reported that the project did not affect them as much as they had feared before the project. Minor inconveniences were reported, with some commuters recounting only minor delays in trips downtown. The noise was cited as the worst side effect of the project by several residents in media reports. The work on Allegan Street that was originally planned for 2005 was scheduled by MDOT for the 2004 construction season. The project wrapped up for the year in November. Construction resumed on the remaining sections of the project on March 14, 2005. This phase included the remaining work on Allegan and Walnut streets. By May, the affected streets were reduced to gravel and completed streets had been reopened. Additional work scheduled for 2005 included streetscaping improvements to Cedar and Larch streets.

The project wrapped up three months ahead of the original October completion date. The project cost MDOT $15.4 million (in 2005, equivalent to $23.7 million in 2024) with an additional $5.6 million paid by the City of Lansing for the sewer work (in 2003, equivalent to $8.62 million in 2024). Lansing's share of the costs included the reconstruction costs for Walnut and Pine streets, since those streets are not part of the state trunkline system. The completion of the project was marked with a ribbon-cutting ceremony to open the streets to traffic on June 30, 2005.

=== Speed limit controversy ===
A 2006 Michigan law was enacted to reform how cities in the state set speed limits. Under this law, the streets that comprise the Capitol Loop were mismarked according to the Michigan State Police (MSP). The law was designed to eliminate speed traps in the state by basing the determination of speed limits on scientific criteria. Unless a roadway is in a downtown business district or subdivision, the limit is based on the number of access points, either cross streets or driveways, along the roadway. Exceptions to these classifications can be made based on a technical study by traffic engineers. Lansing city officials stated in March 2009 that by adopting the Uniform Vehicle Code instead of the state's Motor Vehicle Code, Lansing is immune from the change in law and can enforce the 25-mile-per-hour (40 km/h) limits.

The Lansing city attorney was dismissing speeding tickets issued on the Capitol Loop in June 2010. The loop was not signed with speed-limit signs, making the tickets unenforceable. The city cannot install the signs on its own because of the state trunkline status of the streets that make up the Capitol Loop; the MSP and MDOT are in charge of setting and signing the speed limits on state trunklines in Michigan. City Attorney Brig Smith stated that until the state agencies complete the speed study and erect the signs, he cannot enforce any tickets for speeding on the Capitol Loop. MSP and MDOT officials stated that the study is complete and the new signs are on order. The limits were raised from 25 to 30 mph (40 to 48 km/h) on the eastern half of the loop and 35 mph (56 km/h) on the western half as a result of the MDOT and MSP speed studies. State Representative Rick Jones from Grand Ledge has been pushing for scientifically set speed limits in the state to limit speed traps, and he has proposed new legislation to force cities to comply with the 2006 law, ending any loopholes used by cities to set lower limits. As Jones explained to reporters, the current situation is one where "... streets are artificially posted too low for the purpose of writing tickets."

=== Decommissioning ===
The length of the Capitol Loop that ran independent of BL I-96 was transferred to the City of Lansing on March 26, 2024. The city has been converting streets from one-way traffic to two-way since 2022, including plans to convert Ottawa and Allegan streets during 2024. With the transfer, the Capitol Loop designation was removed from the state highway system.

== Major intersections ==
The entire highway was in Lansing, Ingham County.

Eastbound

mi	km	Destinations	Notes
0.000	0.000	I-496 (Ransom E. Olds Freeway) M-99 south (Martin Luther King Jr. Boulevard)	Exit 5 on I-496; northern terminus of M-99
0.451	0.726	Allegan Street	Capitol Loop turned eastward; one-way traffic started
1.263	2.033	Grand Avenue	Capitol Loop turned northward
1.331	2.142	Michigan Avenue	Capitol Loop turned eastward; two-way traffic resumed
1.537	2.474	BL I-96 west (Cedar Street)	Northern end of BL I-96 concurrency; Capitol Loop turned southward; one-way traffic resumed
2.088	3.360	I-496 (Ransom E. Olds Freeway) BL I-96 east (Cedar Street)	Southern end of BL I-96 concurrency as Cedar Street continues south as BL I-96 only; exit 7 on I-496
1.000 mi = 1.609 km; 1.000 km = 0.621 mi: Concurrency terminus

Westbound

mi	km	Destinations	Notes
2.398	3.859	I-496 (Ransom E. Olds Freeway) BL I-96 east (Larch Street)	Southern end of BL I-96 concurrency; exit 7 on I-496
1.857	2.989	Michigan Avenue BL I-96 west (Larch Street)	Northern end of BL I-96 concurrency as Larch Street continues northward as BL I-96 only; Capitol Loop turned westward; two-way traffic started
1.553	2.499	Grand Avenue	Capitol Loop turned northward; one-way traffic resumed
1.481	2.383	Ottawa Street	Capitol Loop turned westward
0.638	1.027	Martin Luther King Jr. Boulevard	Capitol Loop turned southward; two-way traffic resumed
0.000	0.000	I-496 (Ransom E. Olds Freeway) M-99 south (Martin Luther King Jr. Boulevard)	Exit 5 on I-496; Martin Luther King Jr. Boulevard continues south as M-99
1.000 mi = 1.609 km; 1.000 km = 0.621 mi: Concurrency terminus

== See also ==
- List of state trunkline highways in Michigan § Connectors for other signed connector routes in the state
