= M155 =

M155 may refer to:

- M-155 highway (Michigan), a spur route from BL I-96 in Howell in Livingston County to the Hillcrest Center
- Mercedes-Benz M155 engine, a car engine
- M155 (Cape Town), a Metropolitan Route in Cape Town, South Africa
