= Business routes of Interstate 96 =

List of highways in Michigan

Business Loop Interstate 96
- Business routes of Interstate 96 highlighted

Location
- Country: United States
- State: Michigan

Highway system
- Interstate Highway System; Main; Auxiliary; Suffixed; Business; Future; Michigan State Trunkline Highway System; Interstate; US; State; Byways
← I-96	→ M-96

There have been six business routes of Interstate 96 (I-96) in the US state of Michigan. There are two business loops designated Business Loop Interstate 96 (BL I-96): one through Lansing and one through Howell. Both follow the old route of US Highway 16 (US 16), with appropriate connections to I-96. There are three former business spurs that were designated Business Spur Interstate 96 (BS I-96). One connected to the carferry docks in Muskegon, running concurrently with part of Business US 31 (Bus. US 31) along former US 16, but it has been eliminated. The second spur ran into downtown Portland until it was decommissioned in 2007. Two routes in the Detroit area—a loop through Farmington and a spur into Detroit—both using Grand River Avenue, and meeting at the temporary end of I-96 near Purdue Avenue, were eliminated when I-96 was moved to the completed Jeffries Freeway in 1977. The Farmington business route is still state-maintained as an unsigned highway, while the Detroit business route remained unsigned until it was decommissioned in 2016 and replaced by an extension of M-5.

== Muskegon ==
Business Spur Interstate 196
- Location: Muskegon
- Length: 6.160 mi (9.914 km)
- Existed: 1962–1963

Business Spur Interstate 96
- Location: Muskegon
- Length: 6.160 mi (9.914 km)
- Existed: 1963–1984

Business Spur Interstate 96 (BS I-96) was a business spur of I-96 in the Muskegon area. It was formerly the route of US 16 from the carferry docks in Muskegon to the end of I-96 in Norton Shores. The spur ran concurrently with M-46 southeasterly from the docks along Mart Street and Sixth Street. At the intersections with the one-way pairing of Webster Avenue (southbound) and Muskegon Avenue (northbound) in downtown Muskegon, BS I-96 separated from M-46 and turned southward to follow Bus. US 31 while M-46 turned northward along Bus. US 31. From there, BS I-96/Bus. US 31 ran southwesterly along the one-way pair for a few blocks before the two directions of traffic merged onto the north–south section of Seaway Drive southwest of downtown. The business route then ran due south along Seaway Drive, exiting Muskegon at Sherman Drive and crossing onto a section of the Norton Shores–Muskegon Heights city line. South of Norton Avenue, Seaway Drive turned eastward along the southern edge of Muskegon Heights. BS I-96/Bus. US 31 ran along the northern edge of Mona Lake and crossed the Black Creek in Norton Shores. Southwest of the lake, the business route came to an end at the interchange along US 31 that marked the western starting point of I-96.

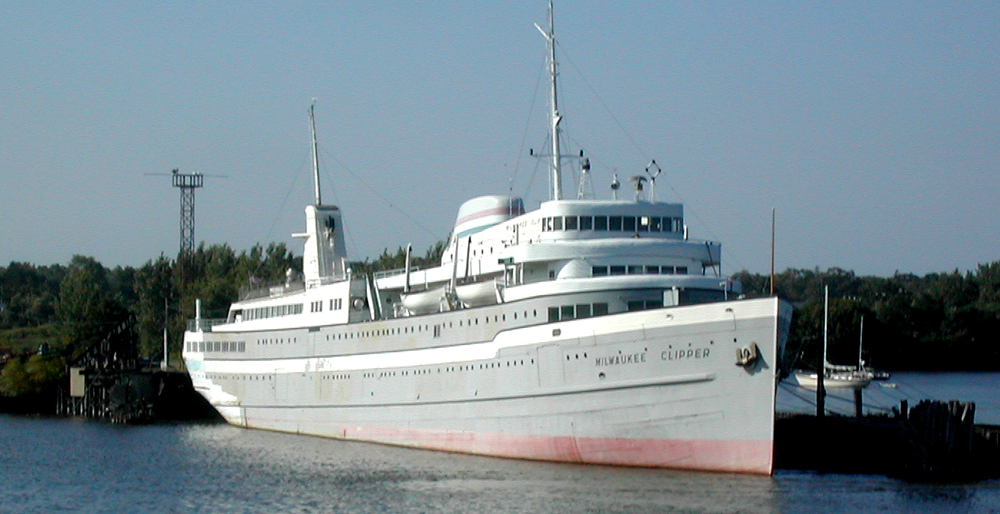
SS Milwaukee Clipper docked in Muskegon

When the state highway system was first signposted in 1919, the east–west highway from Grand Haven through Nunica to Detroit was assigned the M-16 designation; there was no state highway between Muskegon and Nunica, This was redesignated US 16 in 1926. By 1934, a state highway numbered M-126 was designated between Muskegon and Nunica, and this was replaced by a rerouted US 16 in 1940. On December 12, 1962, the freeway that is now I-96 was initially completed across the state of Michigan from Muskegon to the Detroit area. After this completion, US 16 was decommissioned. West of Grand Rapids, the freeway was originally I-196, and the route of former US 16 past the end of the freeway to the ferry dock was numbered BS I-196. The freeway was redesignated I-96 on October 21, 1963, and BS I-196 became BS I-96 thereafter. In 1970, the SS Milwaukee Clipper across Lake Michigan ceased to run. In 1984, the section of BS I-96/M-46 between the ferry docks and Bus. US 31 was turned over to local control. The BS I-96 designation was decommissioned and removed from its concurrency with Bus. US 31, and M-46 was truncated to end at its other junction with Bus. US 31.

Major intersections
The entire highway was in Muskegon County.

Location	mi	km	Destinations	Notes
Muskegon	0.000	0.000	Carferry docks M-46 east	Carferries connected to Milwaukee, Wisconsin; western terminus of M-46
Muskegon	1.100	1.770	Bus. US 31 north / M-46 east	Northern end of Bus. US 31 concurrency; eastern end of M-46 concurrency
Norton Shores	6.160	9.914	I-96 – Grand Rapids; US 31 – Holland, Ludington Bus. US 31 north	Southern end of Bus. US 31 concurrency; western terminus of I-96
1.000 mi = 1.609 km; 1.000 km = 0.621 mi: Concurrency terminus

== Portland ==
Business Spur Interstate 96
- Location: Portland
- Length: 1.289 mi (2.074 km)
- Existed: September 18, 1978–October 31, 2007

Business Spur Interstate 96 (BS I-96) was a business spur of I-96 through the city of Portland. The western terminus was at the corner of Grand River Avenue and Kent Street in downtown Portland. From there the highway followed Grand River Avenue eastward through downtown and past businesses roughly parallel to the Looking Glass River. East of downtown, the spur turned southeasterly past another commercial area. The highway's eastern terminus was at exit 77 south of the city.

When the state highway system was first signposted in 1919, the east–west highway across the Lower Peninsula through Portland to Detroit was assigned the M-16 designation, This was redesignated US 16 in 1926. The section of US 16 through Portland was decommissioned on March 7, 1960. It would remain under local control until the first quarter-mile (0.4 km) section was transferred to state control on September 18, 1978. The route was first marked on state highway maps in 1982 along the full mile and a quarter (2.0 km). It was transferred back to local control on October 31, 2007.

Major intersections
The entire highway was in Portland, Ionia County.

mi	km	Destinations	Notes
0.000	0.000	Grand River Avenue west Kent Street	Roadway continued west as Grand River Avenue
1.289	2.074	I-96 – Grand Rapids, Lansing	Exit 77 on I-96
1.000 mi = 1.609 km; 1.000 km = 0.621 mi

== Lansing ==
Business Loop Interstate 96
- Location: Lansing
- Length: 10.259 mi (16.510 km)
- Existed: 1962–present

Business Loop Interstate 96 (BL I-96) is a business loop of I-96 through the city of Lansing. The western terminus is at I-96's exit 90 northwest of Lansing in Watertown Township in Clinton County near the I-96/I-69 junction. From there, it follows Grand River Avenue under I-96. East of I-96, BL I-96 intersects Francis Road, which provides access to I-69, and then passes under I-69. Grand River Avenue is three lanes, one in each direction divided by a central turn lane, and runs past light industrial areas, crossing into Lansing and Eaton County near the Capital Region International Airport. The area around the airport is commercial, but east of there North Grand River Avenue runs through residential neighborhoods. Near the intersection with Martin Luther King Jr Boulevard, the business loop runs along the Grand River and then BL I-96 turns eastward on North Street to an interchange with Cedar and Larch streets. The business loop turns and splits onto the one-way pairing of the three-lane Cedar (southbound) and Larch (northbound). As it runs southward, the highway runs parallel to the Grand River through Old Town Lansing. At Oakland Avenue (westbound) and Saginaw Avenue (eastbound), BL I-96 intersects the two one-way streets that carry BL I-69. It continues south through the eastern edge of downtown Lansing.

Near Jackson Field at the intersection with Michigan Avenue, BL I-96 meets the Capitol Loop, Lansing's third business loop. The two highways run concurrently south of Michigan Avenue as Cedar Street angles southeasterly. The two directions of BL I-96 merge at an interchange with I-496 that also marks the end of the Capitol Loop. South of this interchange, Cedar Street continues as a five-lane street through a commercial corridor on the south side of Lansing. The business loop crosses the Red Cedar River three blocks south of the I-496 interchange. On either side of the business loop, the adjacent neighborhoods are residential in character. South of an intersection with Jolly Road, Cedar Street starts angling southeasterly. BL I-96 ends at an indirect interchange with I-96 near the Edgewood Town Center.

When the state highway system was first signposted in 1919, the east–west highway across the Lower Peninsula through Lansing to Detroit was assigned the M-16 designation. M-16 was rerouted in the Lansing area in 1925, running along Grand River Avenue from Grand Ledge to East Lansing. The former routing through Downtown Lansing on Michigan Avenue became part of M-39. This was redesignated US 16 in 1926. With the completion of I-96 in between Lansing and Brighton, US 16 was decommissioned in Michigan in 1962. The former routing of US 16 on the north side of Lansing was redesignated as BL I-96. Through downtown, it followed the former US 27 on Larch Street. There, BL I-96 joined US 27 along a one-way pairing of Larch and Cedar streets. Where US 27 turned to join M-78 at Main Street, BL I-96 continued along US 127 along Cedar Street to terminate at I-96 south of the city at exit 104. In 1963, BL I-96 was rerouted onto the first portion of the I-496 freeway to be constructed southeast of the city. This rerouting would last until 1966 when it was transferred back to the original routing with the completion of the US 127 freeway between Lansing and Mason. BL I-96 was rerouted along M-43/Bus. M-78 to the I-496/M-78 freeway and back to I-96 at exit 106. Once the US 127 freeway was completed, BL I-96 was rerouted back along the former US 127 routing to I-96.

Major intersections

County	Location	mi	km	Destinations	Notes
Clinton	Watertown Township	0.000	0.000	I-96 – Grand Rapids, Detroit	Exit 90 on I-96
Ingham	Lansing	3.552– 3.784	5.716– 6.090	Cedar Street north North Street east	Interchange where BL I-96 transitions between North and Cedar/Larch streets; Cedar Street is a former routing of US 27 now designated as unsigned Bus. US 127
Ingham	Lansing	4.194	6.750	BL I-69 / M-43 west (Oakland Avenue)	Oakland Avenue is a one-way street westbound
Ingham	Lansing	4.393	7.070	BL I-69 (Saginaw Avenue) / M-43 east	Saginaw Avenue is a one-way street eastbound
Ingham	Lansing	4.893	7.875	Capitol Loop west	Northern end of Capitol Loop concurrency
Ingham	Lansing	5.444– 5.458	8.761– 8.784	I-496 Capitol Loop west	Southern end of Capitol Loop concurrency and eastern terminus of the Capitol Loop; exit 7 on I-496
Ingham	Lansing	10.240– 10.259	16.480– 16.510	I-96 – Grand Rapids, Detroit	Exit 104 on I-96; indirect access via trumpet interchange
1.000 mi = 1.609 km; 1.000 km = 0.621 mi: Concurrency terminus

== Howell ==
Business Loop Interstate 96
- Location: Howell
- Length: 7.803 mi (12.558 km)
- Existed: 1962–present

Business Loop Interstate 96 (BL I-96) is a business loop of I-96 through the city of Howell. The western terminus is at the M-59 interchange with I-96 northwest of Howell. BL I-96 runs concurrently with M-59 along a four-lane divided highway for about a one mile (1.6 km) before turning southeasterly onto Grand River Avenue near the Livingston County Airport. The business loop passes through a residential neighborhood on the western side of Howell before entering downtown. In downtown, BL I-96 runs along a four-lane street and meets the northern end of the unsigned M-155 at Michigan Avenue. Southeast of downtown, the business loop passes through more residential areas before following a commercial corridor to a partial interchange with I-96 south of Lake Chemung.

When the state highway system was first signposted in 1919, the east–west highway across the Lower Peninsula through Howell to Detroit was assigned the M-16 designation. This was redesignated US 16 in 1926. In 1962, I-96 was completed between Lansing and Brighton, and US 16 was decommissioned in Michigan. At the time, a new limited-access connector road was constructed between I-96 and Grand River Avenue, providing access for the business loop and M-59 to I-96. Afterwards, the former route of US 16 along Grand River Avenue through Howell was redesignated BL I-96.

Major intersections
The entire highway is in Livingston County.

Location	mi	km	Destinations	Notes
Howell Township	0.000	0.000	I-96 – Lansing, Detroit M-59 east	Western end of M-59 concurrency; exit 133 on I-96
Howell Township	1.004	1.616	M-59 east (Highland Road) – Pontiac	Eastern end of M-59 concurrency
Howell	3.645	5.866	M-155 south (Michigan Avenue)	Northern terminus of the unsigned M-155
Howell	7.803	12.558	I-96 east – Detroit	Westbound entrance and eastbound exit; exit 141 on I-96
1.000 mi = 1.609 km; 1.000 km = 0.621 mi: Concurrency terminus; Incomplete access

== Farmington ==
Business Loop Interstate 96
- Location: Farmington
- Length: 4.129 mi (6.645 km)
- Existed: 1961–present
- History: Signage removed in 1977

Old Business Loop I-96 (Old BL I-96) is a 4.129-mile-long (6.645 km) segment of unsigned state trunkline highway and was a former business loop of I-96 along Grand River Avenue through the city of Farmington. The western terminus is at the interchange between M-5 and Grand River Avenue west of the city. From there, the highway runs eastward through residential areas on the border of Farmington and Farmington Hills. At the intersection with Shiawasee Road, Grand River Avenue turns southeasterly into downtown Farmington. The highway is bounded by businesses from downtown southeasterly to its eastern terminus is at the intersection between M-5 and Grand River Avenue southeast of Farmington.

When the state highway system was first signposted in 1919, the east–west highway across the Lower Peninsula through Lansing to Detroit was assigned the M-16 designation. This highway was the original route of US 16 though downtown Farmington. In 1933, US 16 was routed onto a bypass route which had been constructed south of the city (the present-day Freedom Road) and the route through Farmington was retained as state trunkline. In 1956, a new bypass freeway was built just to the south of the old bypass as part of the Brighton–Farmington Expressway and the route through downtown was designated Business US 16. (Bus. US 16)

The original plans for I-96 called for it to replace US 16 and to run parallel to Grand River Avenue all the way from Farmington into downtown Detroit. In 1959, the Farmington bypass freeway was given the I-96 designation in addition to the US 16 moniker, and the business route was redesignated as BL I-96 two years later. In 1977, as the Jeffries Freeway was completed, I-96 was rerouted south through Livonia and then east into Detroit, the portion of freeway bypassing Farmington was redesignated M-102. Simultaneously, the BL I-96 designation through downtown Farmington was removed, and Grand River Avenue became an unsigned state trunkline, a status it has retained to this day.

Major intersections
The entire highway is in Oakland County.

Location	mi	km	Destinations	Notes
Farmington Hills	0.000	0.000	M-5	Interchange
Farmington	1.723	2.773	Shiawassee Road	
Farmington	2.166	3.486	Farmington Road	
Farmington Hills	4.129	6.645	M-5 / Grand River Avenue	Roadway continues as M-5
1.000 mi = 1.609 km; 1.000 km = 0.621 mi

== Detroit ==
Business Spur Interstate 96
- Location: Detroit
- Length: 7.083 mi (11.399 km)
- Existed: 1962–May 2016
- History: Most signage removed in 1977, remaining signage gradually removed 2000–mid 2010s

Old Business Spur I-96 (Old BS I-96) was the section of Grand River Avenue in Detroit between I-96 and the intersection with Cass Avenue and Middle Street in downtown Detroit and an unsigned state trunkline highway. It was previously a business spur of I-96. Picking up where M-5 ended at the interchange with I-96, Old BS I-96 followed Grand River Avenue southeasterly. The road itself was bounded by businesses as it passed through residential neighborhoods on Detroit's West Side. About a mile and three-quarters (2.8 km) along, the highway crossed I-96 again, and I-96 from here into the downtown area paralleled Grand River Avenue. Old BS I-96 here was mostly residential. It passed Bishop Park near Grand Boulevard and then crossed I-94. In the North Corktown neighborhood, Grand River Avenue crossed M-10 (Lodge Freeway) near the MotorCity Casino. About a half mile (0.7 km) past M-10, Old BS I-96 crossed I-75 (Fisher Freeway) and entered Downtown Detroit's Foxtown neighborhood. State maintenance ended at the five-way intersection between Grand River Avenue, Cass Avenue, and Middle Street. Grand River Avenue continued another five blocks to Woodward Avenue and another four blocks as it curved in an arc around Grand Circus Park.

When the state highway system was first signposted in 1919, the east–west highway across the Lower Peninsula through Grand Rapids and Lansing to Detroit was assigned the M-16 designation. The section of highway had previously been part of US 16. When US 16 was decommissioned in 1962, Grand River Avenue was redesignated BS I-96. Upon completion of I-96 (Jeffries Freeway) in Detroit in 1977, portions were re-designated M-102 and M-5. From I-96 southeast into downtown Detroit, Grand River Avenue remained under state control as an unsigned state trunkline highway, though some BS I-96 trailblazers in downtown Detroit remained afterwards. Most of these leftover BS I-96 trailblazers were removed around 2000 after the City of Detroit transferred maintenance of state trunkline highways within the city to the state, though a few trailblazers remained along downtown Detroit streets that remained under city jurisdiction into the 2010s. In 2004, the state transferred several blocks at the eastern end of Grand River Avenue to the City of Detroit. State jurisdiction now ended at the corner of Grand River Avenue, Middle Street, and Cass Avenue. In April–May 2016, a street light replacement project on Grand River Avenue ended Old BS I-96's status as a state trunkline highway as the project also included the installation of M-5 trailblazers along Old BS I-96's route.

Major intersections
The entire highway was in Detroit, Wayne County.

mi	km	Destinations	Notes
0.000	0.000	I-96 (Jeffries Freeway) – Lansing, Bridge to Canada M-5 west	Exit 185 on I-96; eastern terminus of M-5
1.784– 1.808	2.871– 2.910	I-96 (Jeffries Freeway) – Lansing, Bridge to Canada	Westbound entrance and eastbound exit from I-96; exit 187 on I-96
4.676– 4.686	7.525– 7.541	I-94 (Edsel Ford Freeway) – Ann Arbor, Port Huron	Exit 214 on I-94
6.380– 6.397	10.268– 10.295	M-10 (Lodge Freeway)	Southbound exit from and northbound entrance to M-10; exit 2C on M-10
6.793– 6.810	10.932– 10.960	I-75 (Fisher Freeway) – Toledo, Flint	Exit 50 on I-75
7.083	11.399	Grand River Avenue; Cass Avenue; Middle Street	Roadway continued as Grand River Avenue
1.000 mi = 1.609 km; 1.000 km = 0.621 mi: Incomplete access
