= Jackson Field (Lansing) =

Baseball park in Michigan, United States

- Lugnuts Stadium

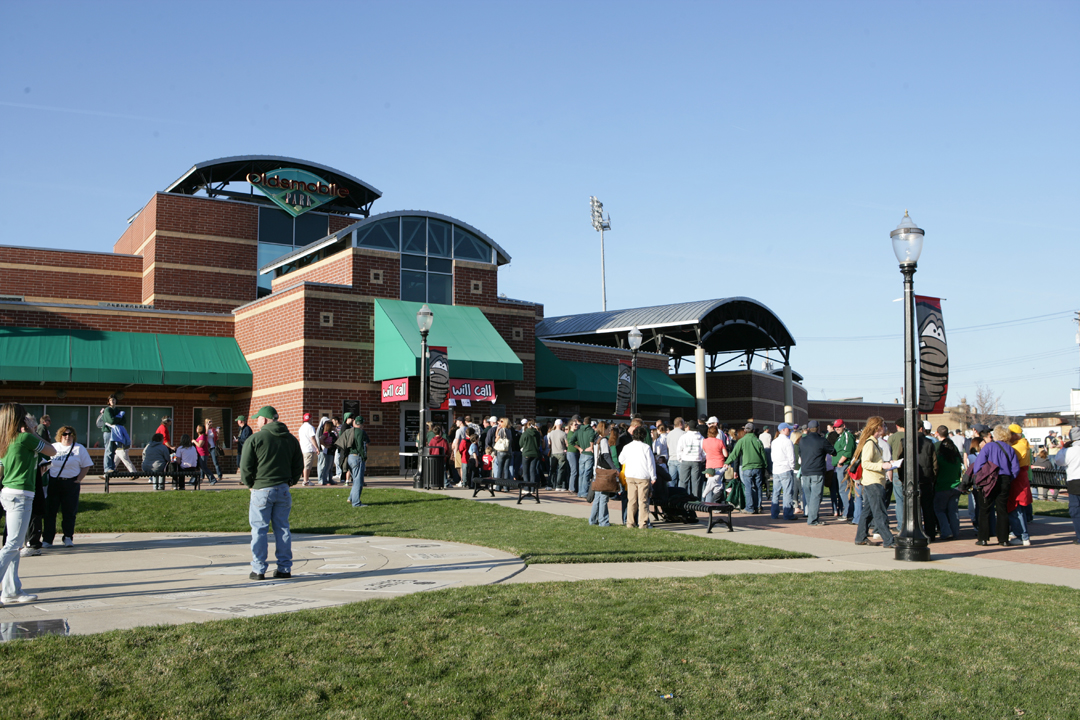

- Location within Michigan Location within the United States
- Interactive map of Jackson Field
- Former names: Cooley Law School Stadium (2011–2020); Jackson Field at Thomas M. Cooley Law School Stadium (2010); Oldsmobile Park (1996–2009)
- Address: 505 East Michigan Avenue; Lansing, MI 48912
- Coordinates: 42°44′5″N 84°32′43″W
- Owner: City of Lansing
- Operator: Lansing Entertainment & Public Facilities Authority (LEPFA)
- Capacity: 7,527 (+ 2,000 lawn, patio and standing room)
- Surface: Grass
- Field size: Left field: 305 feet (93 m); Left-center: 380 feet (120 m); Center field: 404 feet (123 m); Right-center: 412 feet (126 m); Right field: 305 feet (93 m)

Construction
- Groundbreaking: April 3, 1995
- Opened: April 3, 1996
- Cost: $12.8 million ($26.3 million in 2025 dollars)
- Architect: HNTB Corporation (Kansas City)
- Structural engineers: J&S Structural Engineers
- General contractor: Clark Construction

Tenants
- Lansing Lugnuts (MWL) 1996–present Michigan State Spartans (NCAA) 1996–present Lansing Ignite FC (USL1) 2019

Jackson Field is a baseball stadium in Lansing, Michigan, home field of the Lansing Lugnuts minor league baseball team. The Michigan State Spartans college baseball team also plays select home games at Jackson Field. The stadium is situated in downtown Lansing in the Stadium District on a relatively narrow strip of land between and below Larch and Cedar streets.

It is primarily used for baseball, though it has also hosted an ice skating rink, an outdoor movie theater, a haunted house, and served as a concert venue for the annual Common Ground Music Festival. Due to the dimensions of the city block in which the stadium was constructed, the right and left field fences 'notch' sharply into distances of 305 feet (93 m) at each foul pole.

== History ==
The stadium replaced a block of storefronts along Michigan Avenue. Originally budgeted $10 million for construction, the construction costs rose slightly to $12.8 million.

Groundbreaking for the stadium took place on April 3, 1995, and it was officially opened exactly one year later on April 3, 1996, as Oldsmobile Park. Its first game was between the college baseball teams of the University of Michigan and Michigan State University. Two days later, the Lansing Lugnuts had their first game at the venue against the Rockford Cubbies.

On February 22, 2010, Lansing mayor Virgil Bernero announced that the stadium would be renamed Thomas M. Cooley Law School Stadium, a result of the park's new sponsorship agreement. In March 2010, Lansing-based Jackson National Life Insurance Company purchased the rights to name the field "Jackson Field" for 1 year. Thus, the full name of the venue was Jackson Field at Thomas M. Cooley Law School Stadium.

On March 12, 2014, a $22 million renovation proposal for the stadium was announced named "The Outfield." It would include $11 million in public bonds for renovation of the actual stadium structure including new turf, and updated locker rooms, concessions and new box seats. $11 million in additional private investments which would include 80 apartments, a year-round bar and grill, and a new scoreboard. The proposal also includes the city negotiating a new contract with the team which is proposed to bring in an additional 25% revenue for the city.

On September 1, 2020, the stadium announced an official name change to Jackson Field after a 7-year naming rights agreement was signed with Jackson National Life Insurance Company.

== Other uses ==
=== Rugby ===
On October 19, 2018, the Michigan State Spartans and Michigan Wolverines had their rivalry match, the Battle for the Mitten, at Cooley Law School Stadium. Michigan State defeated Michigan 25-15.

=== Soccer ===
On October 25, 2018, the newly planned Lansing Ignite soccer team announced it would begin playing its home games at the stadium. The Ignite ceased operations after just one season.

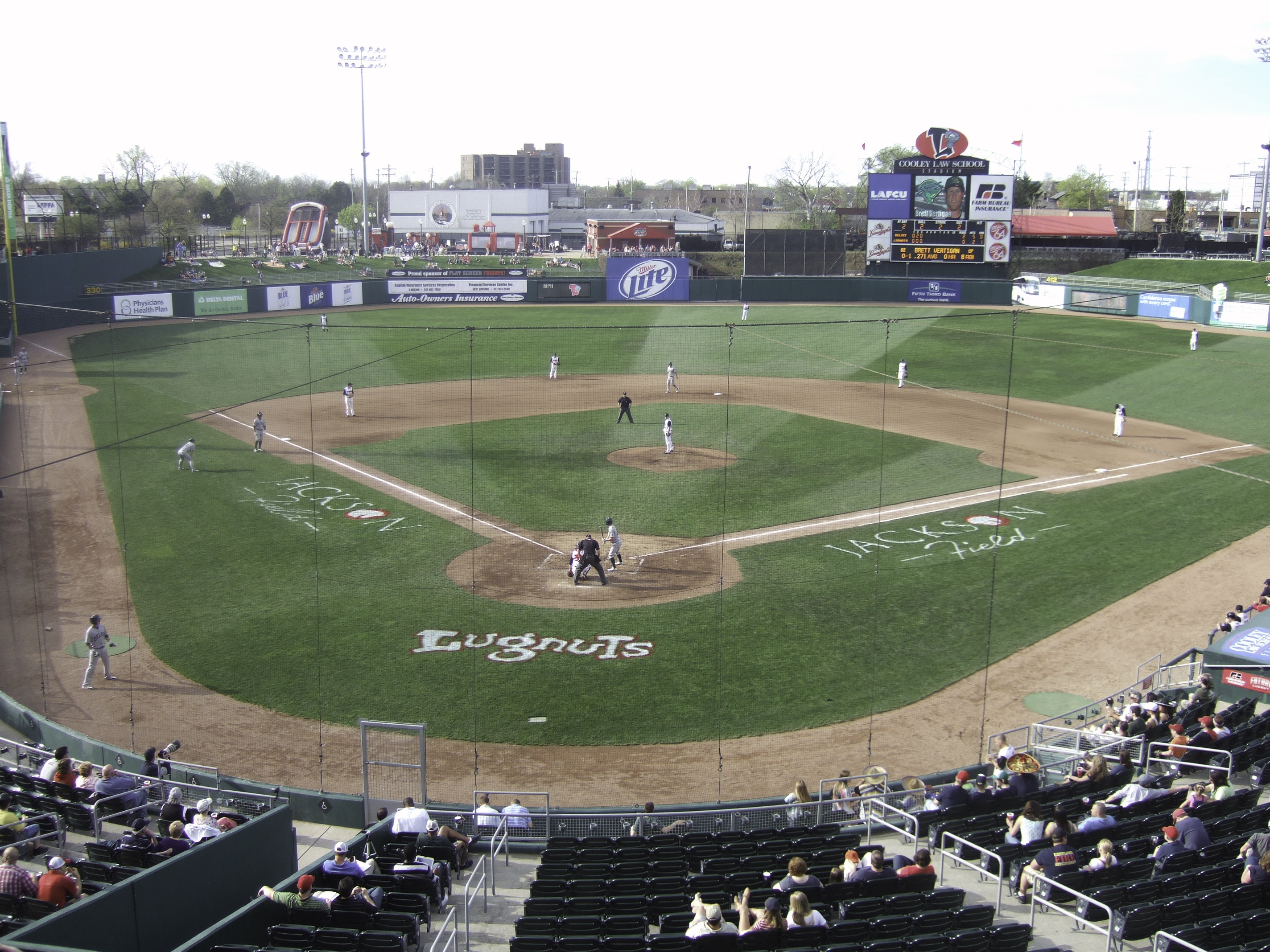
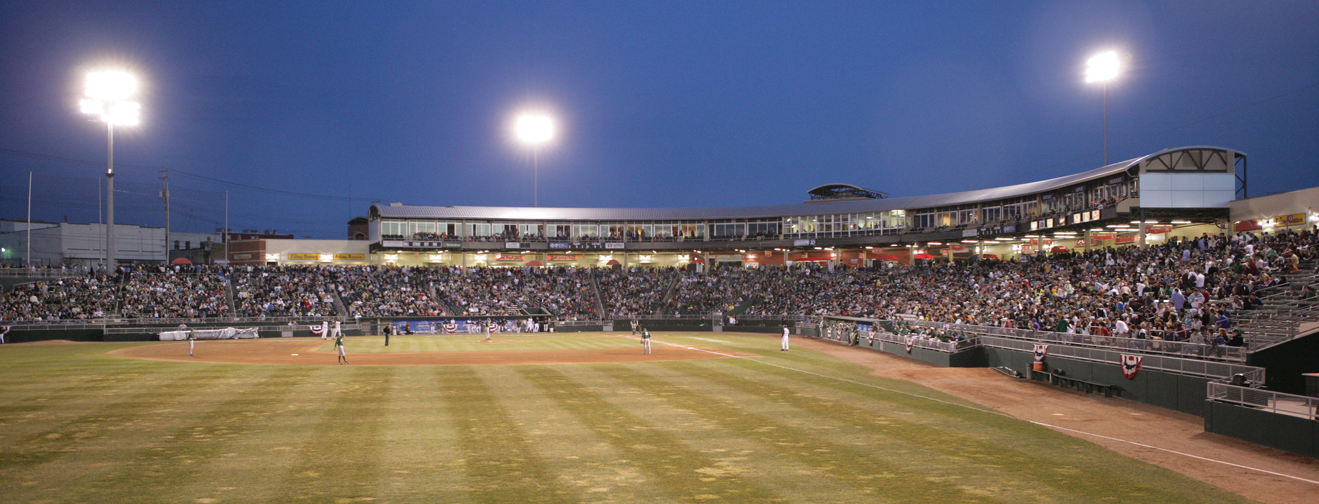
Views of Jackson Field from behind home plate (left) and from the outfield (right)

== See also ==
- List of NCAA Division I baseball venues
