= Boji Tower =

Historic building in Lansing, Michigan, United States

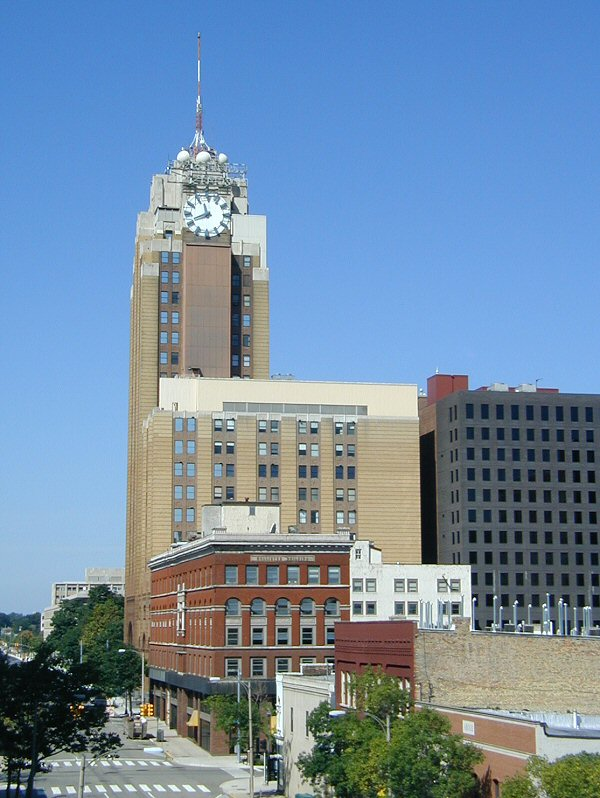
- Boji Tower as seen looking west over Allegan Street
- Interactive map of the Boji Tower area

General information
- Type: Office
- Location: 124 West Allegan Street, Lansing, Michigan, USA
- Construction started: 1929
- Completed: 1931

Height
- Antenna spire: 110.9 m (364 ft)
- Roof: 90.5 m (297 ft)

Technical details
- Floor count: 23 above ground & 2 underground
- Floor area: 185,188.77 sq ft (17,204.600 m^{2})

Design and construction
- Architect: Hopkins & Dentz

Website
- bojigroup.com
- Capital Bank Tower
- U.S. National Register of Historic Places
- Location: 124 West Allegan Street, Lansing, Michigan
- Coordinates: 42°43′58″N 84°33′11″W
- Area: less than one acre
- Built: 1931
- Architect: Hopkins and Dentz; Builder: Hutter Construction Co.
- Architectural style: Art Deco, Skyscraper
- MPS: Downtown Lansing MRA
- NRHP reference No.: 05001357
- Added to NRHP: December 6, 2005

The Boji Tower, also known as the Michigan National Bank Building, is a historic 23-story building located at 124 Allegan Street, in Lansing, Michigan. It has been the tallest building in Lansing since its completion in 1931. On December 6, 2005, the building was added to the National Register of Historic Places as the Capital Bank Tower.

== History ==
The tower was originally constructed as the Olds Tower, named after the automotive industrialist, Ransom Eli Olds, who was the main financier of the tower project, assisted by Edmund C. Shields of the local law firm of Thomas Shields & Silsbee. Shortly thereafter it was renamed Capital Bank Tower, after the bank that Ransom Eli Olds helped form. The cornerstone was laid on November 14, 1929 and the tower opened on April 6, 1931.

It became the Michigan National Bank Tower in 1954, and held that name until 2001 when Standard Federal Bank purchased Michigan National Bank. At the request of Standard Federal, the owners of the tower removed the historic neon 'Michigan National' sign in that year. After four-and-a-half years without a name, the Boji family, a father and son development team of Iraqi descent who owned the tower since 1998, renamed it the Boji Tower in 2005.

The tower has been through one major expansion which occurred between 1965 and 1967, which include the addition of an 11-story annex built directly adjacent to the front of the tower. The tower has undergone multiple minor renovations since 1998 under the Boji Group's ownership. In November 2007, the building's original antenna tower for WITL-FM was replaced via helicopter with a new antenna for WJZL (Now WLMI).

== Description ==
At 23 stories, and 297 feet (91 m), the brick and limestone-faced tower, with its tall, narrow profile topped with a spire and beacon, is a typical American skyscraper design of the Art Deco era of high-rise architecture. It includes four engraved panels in the portals of the main passenger elevators that reflect themes of labor and industry. The tower's facade consists of 654,000 bricks of 17 different colors. The building is occupied by a mix of office, retail, and government tenants. The two-story former banking lobby was used for several years as a hearing room for the Michigan Senate, but in late 2023 the lobby was converted to Senate offices.

The sculpture on the building, including the doors, was created by Ulysses Ricci.

== Photo gallery ==
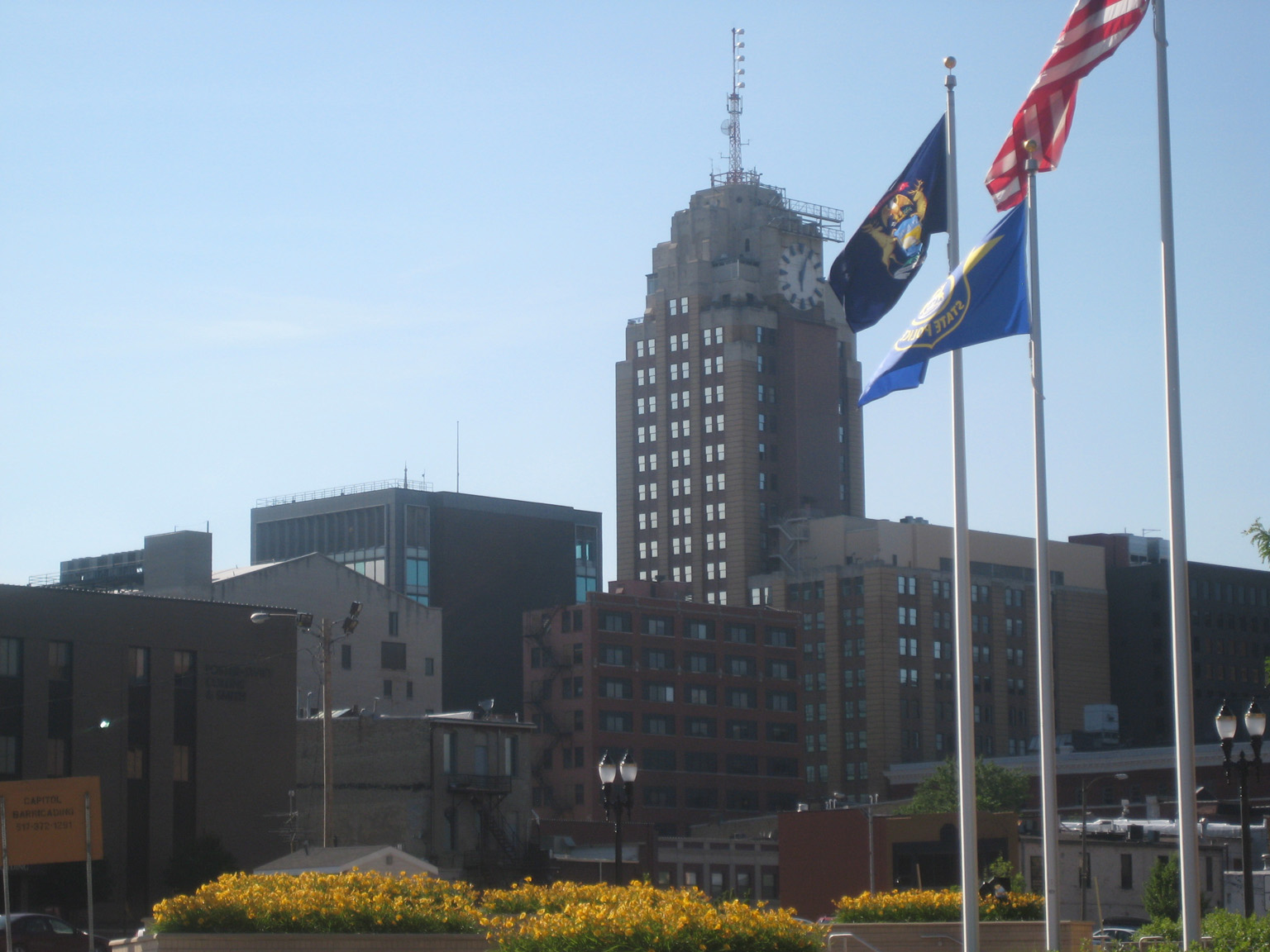
View from Grand Avenue

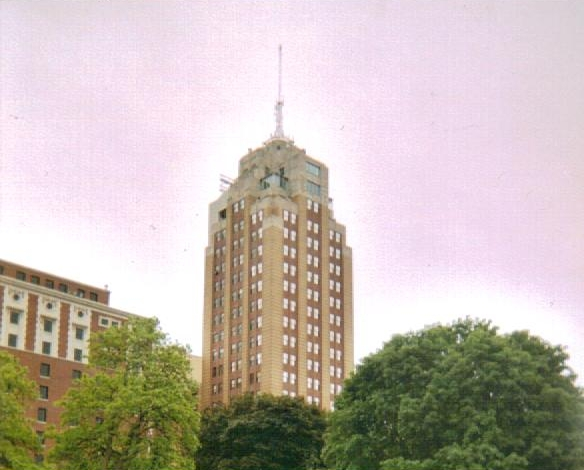

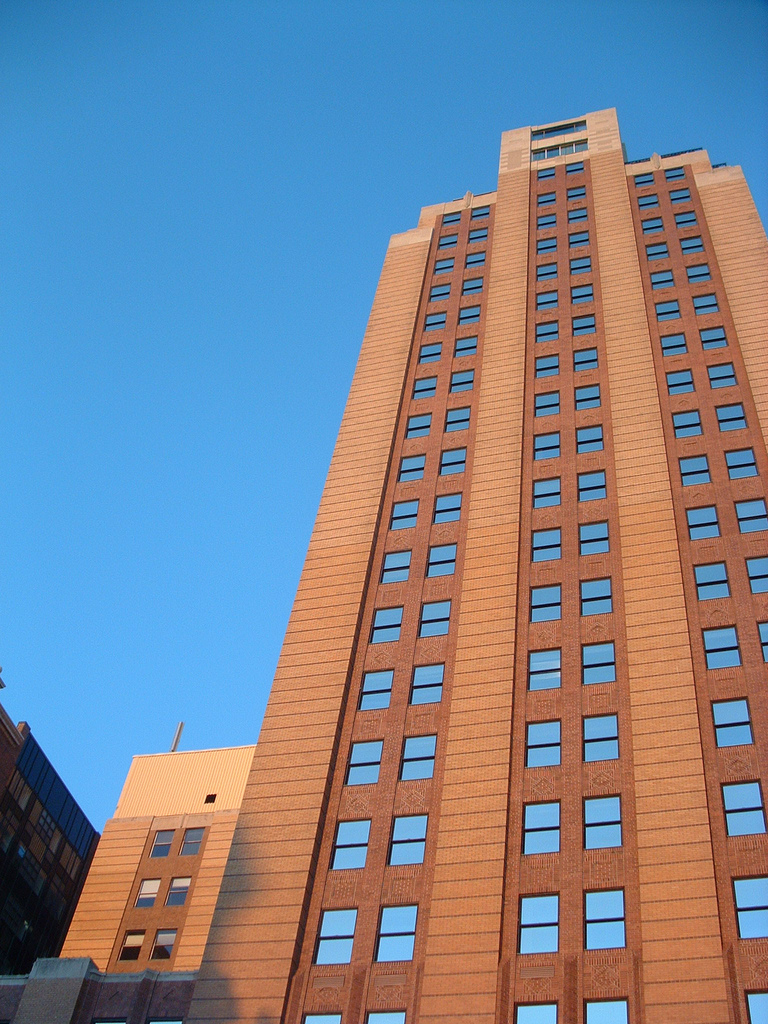
West side

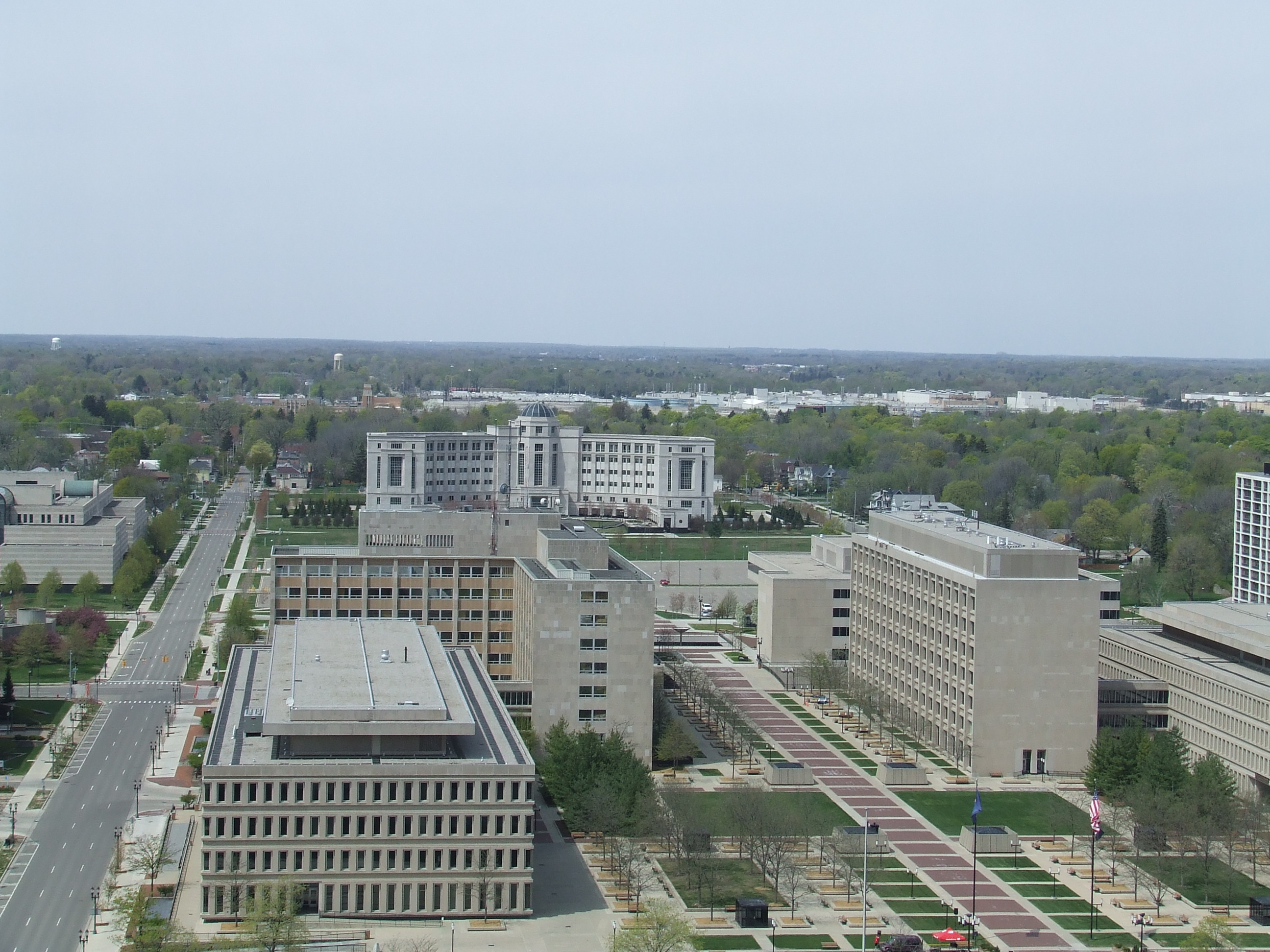
View of State Government Complex from Boji Tower
