= Interstate 496 =

Interstate Highway in Eaton and Ingham counties in Michigan, United States

Interstate 496
- R.E. Olds Freeway
- Lansing area with I-496 highlighted in red

Route information
- Auxiliary route of I-96
- Maintained by MDOT
- Length: 11.907 mi (19.162 km)
- Existed: December 1963–present
- History: Completed on December 18, 1970
- NHS: Entire route

Major junctions
- West end: I-69 / I-96 in Delta Township
- M-99 in Lansing; US 127 near East Lansing
- East end: I-96 / US 127 in Delhi Township

Location
- Country: United States
- State: Michigan
- Counties: Eaton, Ingham

Highway system
- Interstate Highway System; Main; Auxiliary; Suffixed; Business; Future; Michigan State Trunkline Highway System; Interstate; US; State; Byways
← I-475	→ Capitol Loop

Interstate 496 (I-496) is an auxiliary Interstate Highway that passes through downtown Lansing in the US state of Michigan. Also a component of the State Trunkline Highway System, the freeway connects I-96 to the downtown area. It has been named the R.E. Olds Freeway (sometimes just Olds Freeway) for Ransom E. Olds, the founder of Oldsmobile and the REO Motor Car Company. I-496 runs east–west from I-96/I-69 near the downtown area and north–south along a section that runs concurrently with US Highway 127 (US 127). The trunkline also passes a former assembly plant used by Oldsmobile and runs along or crosses parts of the Grand and Red Cedar rivers.

Construction of I-496 started in 1963, and the freeway opened on December 18, 1970. Segments of the freeway south of downtown Lansing were built in the location of a historically black neighborhood. In the opinion of some, this neighborhood was formed based on the segregationist practices of the early 20th century. Community leaders worked for different housing opportunities for the black residents displaced by I-496 rather than fight the freeway. As the trunkline neared completion, competing proposals to name it resulted in two similar, but separate designations applied to I-496. The city originally approved one name in honor of a former mayor. The local historical society proposed that the state name it as a memorial to Olds after the demolition of the Olds Mansion. The city renamed it the Oldsmobile Expressway, the name under which it opened in December 1970. Two years later, the Michigan Legislature restored its preferred name and it has been the Olds Freeway since.

== Route description ==
I-496 starts at an interchange with I-96/I-69 at that freeway's exit 95 in Delta Township in Eaton County. The freeway runs eastward through suburban areas of the township adjacent to some residential subdivisions. Continuing eastward, there is an interchange for Creyts Road before I-496 angles to the northeast. At the interchange with Waverly Road, I-496 crosses into Ingham County. The freeway then runs parallel to the Grand River. Near a partial interchange with Lansing Road (old US 27), the freeway gains a pair of service drives: St. Joseph Street runs one-way westbound on the north side, and Malcolm X Street runs eastbound to the south. The next interchange is for the connection to M-99, which runs along Martin Luther King Jr. Boulevard. South of this interchange, M-99 connects to the Lansing Car Assembly plant, a former facility for Oldsmobile.

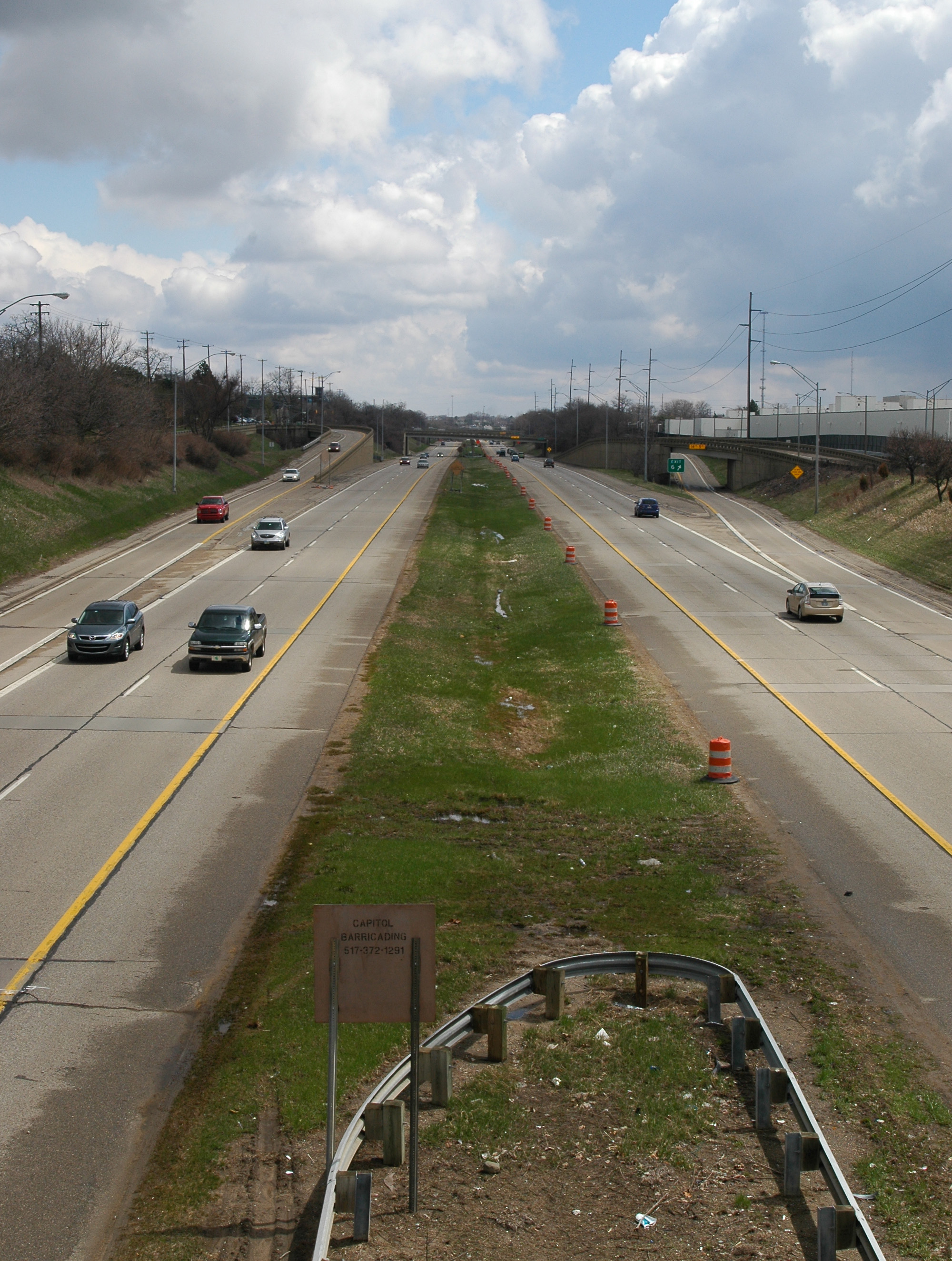
Looking east from the Martin Luther King Jr. Boulevard overpass

Continuing eastward, I-496 passes north of the assembly plant complex and south of the central business district. East of a partial interchange with Walnut Street, the freeway passes the Michigan Women's Hall of Fame, which is located on I-496's southern service drive. The south side of the freeway is adjacent to Cooley Gardens near the confluence of the Grand and Red Cedar rivers. I-496 crosses the Grand River downstream from the confluence and meets the interchange to Business Loop I-96 (BL I-96, Cedar and Larch streets) and Pennsylvania Avenue. St. Joseph Street ends after the connection to Pennsylvania Avenue. The main freeway crosses a rail line owned by CSX Transportation. I-496 runs parallel to the north side of the rail line while Malcolm X Street follows to the south as far as the Clemens Avenue overpass. The freeway then crosses into East Lansing near the Red Cedar Natural Area.

After crossing the city line, I-496 turns southward and merges with US 127. The two highways run concurrently, and they cross a line of the Canadian National Railway. The freeway runs along the western edge of the campus of Michigan State University. South of campus, I-496/US 127 crosses back into Lansing and has an interchange with Jolly Road before entering Delhi Township. About two-thirds of a mile (1.1 km) south of Jolly Road, I-496 meets I-96 and terminates; US 127 continues southward as a freeway toward Jackson.

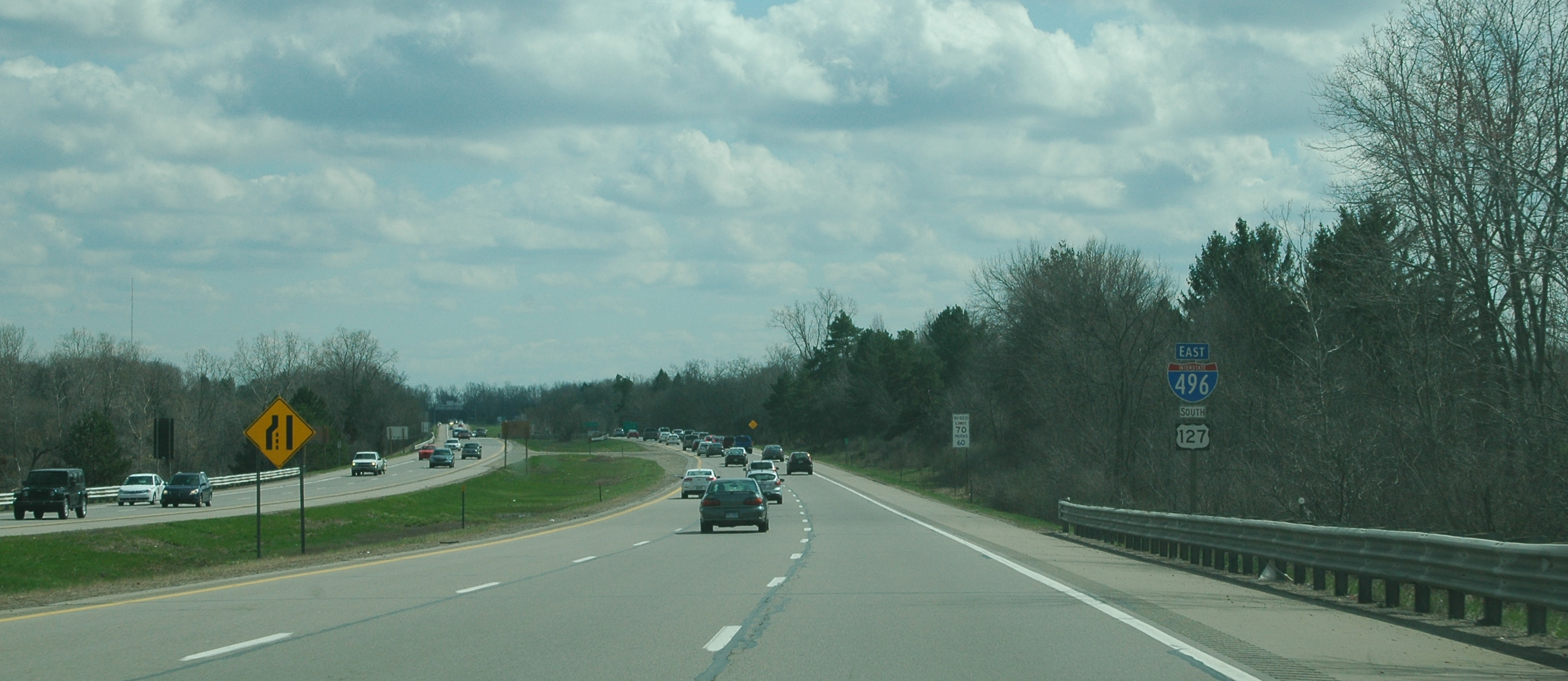
Southbound I-496/US 127 in East Lansing

Like other state highways in Michigan, I-496 is maintained by the Michigan Department of Transportation (MDOT). In 2011, the department's traffic surveys showed that on average, 61,082 vehicles used the freeway between BL I-96 and the Trowbridge Road interchange south of US 127, the highest traffic count along I-496. West of Creyts Road, 17,600 vehicles did so each day, which was the lowest count along the trunkline. As an Interstate Highway, all of I-496 is listed on the National Highway System, a network of roads deemed important to the country's economy, defense, and mobility.

== History ==
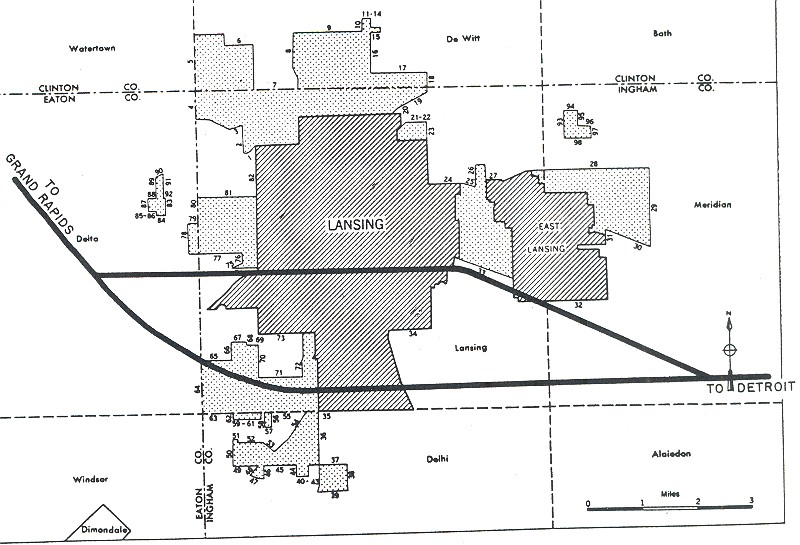
1955 planning map for Lansing's Interstates

An east–west freeway was originally planned as an Interstate Highway allowing traffic to access downtown Lansing in the 1955 General Location of National System of Interstate Highways (Yellow Book), an early proposal for what would become the Interstate Highway System. As originally proposed by the Michigan State Highway Department in 1958, the freeway was to be called I-296. The department was waiting on approval of a final numbering scheme the next year, before the first Interstates were signed in the state in 1959. By the time construction started on the Lansing freeway, it was numbered I-496.

The section near downtown was to be built through a historically African-American neighborhood. The neighborhood was formed through "unwritten rules of segregation" as real estate agents and mortgage brokers guided black residents to the area when they were looking to buy homes. When the state and federal governments were planning the freeway, the area was chosen for the path of I-496. The neighborhood boasted a community center and several businesses that catered to the black population of Lansing, including the only record store that sold rhythm and blues music. Community leaders did not fight the freeway and instead lobbied for affordable housing and relocation assistance. The construction spurred integration of blacks into the wider community; some were able to move into neighborhoods previously closed to them, purchasing "newer houses near better schools." In total, the construction of the freeway required the demolition or removal of nearly 600 homes, 60 businesses, and 15 farms.

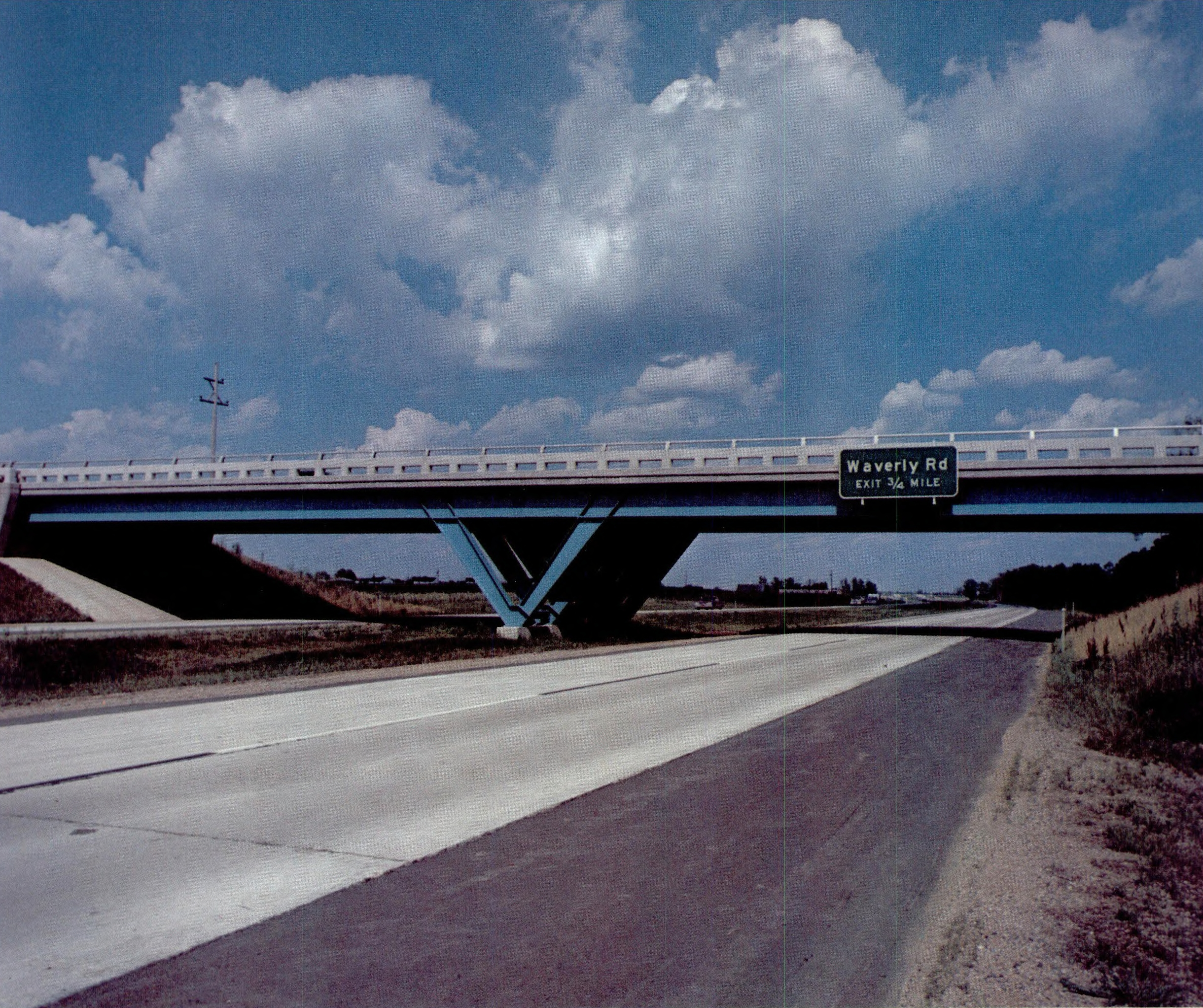
Snow Road bridge over I-496 in the 1970s

The first section of I-496 was opened in December 1963, and ran from I-96 northerly to M-43/M-78 (Saginaw and Kalamazoo streets) between Lansing and East Lansing. The freeway, comprising the southern two-thirds, was designated I-496/M-78/BL I-96 while the northern portion was on city streets as M-78/BL I-96. Some 50 men completed the work by year's end; they went entirely without vacation time to accomplish the feat. Another section of freeway was opened in 1966, and US 127 was rerouted to follow I-496/M-78. BL I-96 was removed from I-496/US 127/M-78 and routed along the former US 127. The freeway segment north of the Trowbridge Road interchange continuing northward as part of US 127 was opened in 1969. Another section opened at the same time was the western section from I-96 to Lansing Road (then US 27) in 1969. The remaining section between M-99 (then Logan Street, now Martin Luther King Jr. Boulevard) and I-496/US 127 opened on December 18, 1970, completing construction.

The freeway underwent a $42.4 million reconstruction (equivalent to $69.7 million in 2023) between April and November 2001 which included the rehabilitation or reconstruction of 35 bridges, 8.5 miles (13.7 km) of freeway, and the addition of a weave-merge lane between Pennsylvania Avenue and US 127. Speed limits were raised along I-496 from 55 to 70 mph (89 to 113 km/h) in 2007 to reflect the speeds motorists were driving during studies conducted by MDOT and the Michigan State Police.

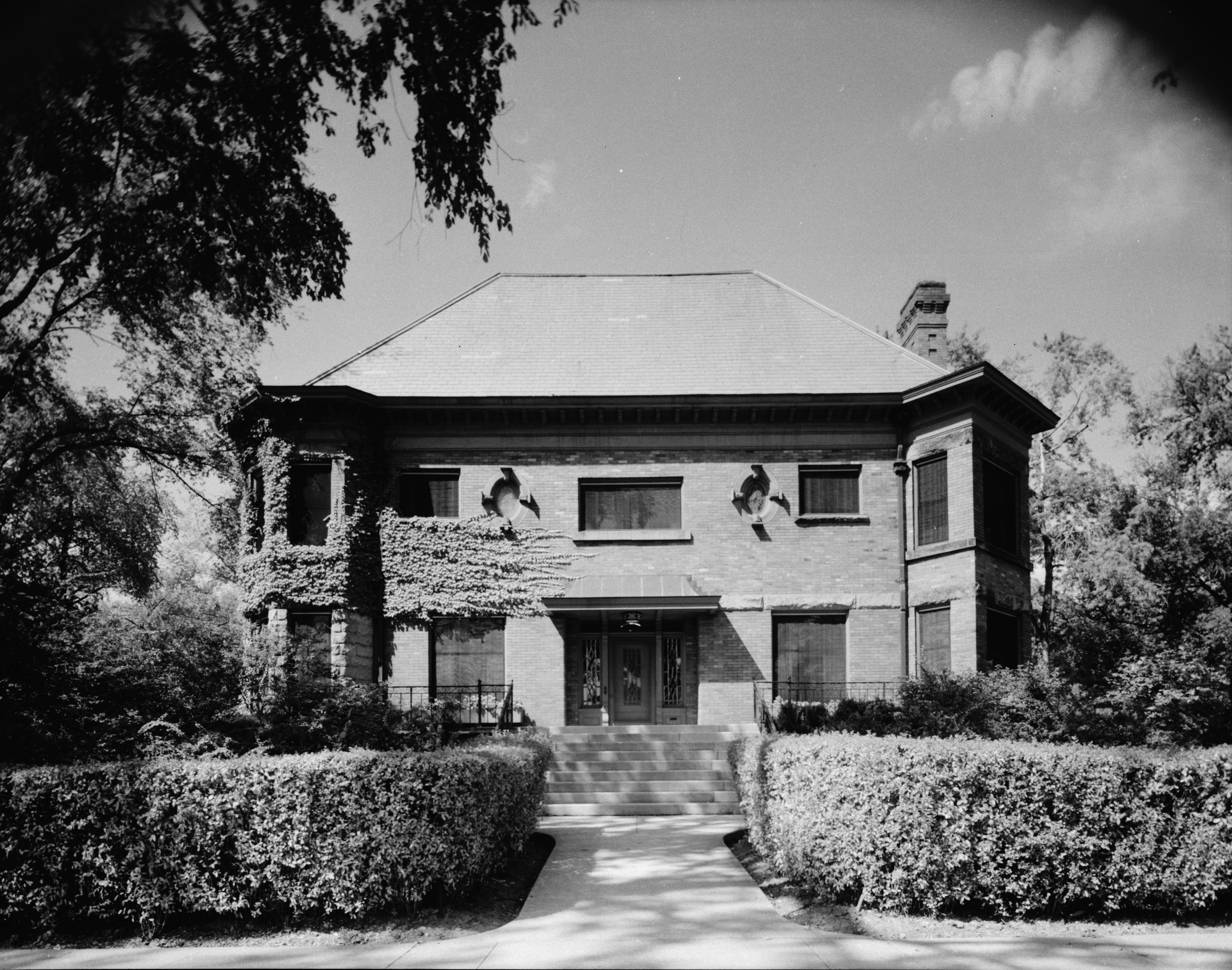
Olds Mansion

The name applied to the freeway was not without controversy. The Lansing City Council named it in September 1966 after Ralph W. Crego, a former city council member and the longest-serving mayor in the city's history. The Historical Society of Greater Lansing wanted it named the "R.E. Olds Expressway", in part because the new road brought about the demolition of the Olds Mansion, which was listed on the National Register of Historic Places, and to "recogniz[e] the contributions of R.E. Olds to the industries of the city." The society approached the Michigan Legislature, which introduced House Resolution 48 in February 1970 using the historical society's preferred name. The city council realized that they had been bypassed and conveniently discovered that their original resolution was not "formally adopted". They named a park for Crego instead in October 1970 and adopted a resolution to name I-496 the "Oldsmobile Expressway". The Legislature approved its resolution resulting in two names, one for the founder of the car company, and one for the company itself. The council member who introduced the city's resolution criticized the Legislature for taking action without consultation. The state resolution was intercepted before it could be sent to the Michigan Department of State Highways, and the freeway opened on December 18, 1970, with the "Oldsmobile Expressway" name. On August 21, 1972, during the celebrations for the 75th anniversary of Oldsmobile, Senate Concurrent Resolution 345 renamed I-496 the "R.E. Olds Freeway".

== Future ==
The portion of I-496 shared with US 127 is being renovated throughout 2024 and 2025 as a part of the US 127 Corridor Project. The work will widen the highway to three lanes in each direction, reconfigure interchanges, improve bridges, and upgrade lighting conditions, among other changes. As of December 2024, construction on the northbound stretch of I-496/US 127 is complete outside of the Trowbridge Road interchange, and improvements to the southbound stretch are slated to begin in early 2025.

In January 2025, the city of Lansing was awarded a $1 million federal grant to develop a plan to cap portions of I-496. According to city officials, the current plan is to cap the portion of I-496 between Martin Luther King Jr. Boulevard and Walnut Street. The grant does not cover construction costs.

== Exit list ==
County	Location	mi	km	Exit	Destinations	Notes
Eaton	Delta Township	0.000	0.000	—	I-96 / I-69 – Grand Rapids, Flint, Detroit, Ft. Wayne	Exit 95 on I-96/I-69
Eaton	Delta Township	1.637	2.634	1	Creyts Road	Signed as exits 1A (south) and 1B (north) westbound
Eaton–Ingham county line	Delta Township–Lansing city line	3.561	5.731	3	Waverly Road	
Ingham	Lansing	4.545	7.314	4	Lansing Road	Westbound exit and eastbound entrance
Ingham	Lansing	5.306– 5.403	8.539– 8.695	5	M-99 south (Martin Luther King Jr. Boulevard)	Northern terminus of M-99
Ingham	Lansing	5.802– 5.950	9.337– 9.576	6	Pine Street, Walnut Street – Downtown Lansing	
Ingham	Lansing	6.273	10.095	7A	Grand Avenue – Downtown Lansing	Westbound exit and eastbound entrance
Ingham	Lansing	6.567– 6.921	10.569– 11.138	7	BL I-96	Separate exits for Cedar Street and Pennsylvania Avenue, connected by collector-distributor roads eastbound only; exit 7A is also attached to collector-distributor roads westbound only
Ingham	Lansing	8.576	13.802	8	US 127 north – Flint, East Lansing	Northern end of US 127 concurrency
Ingham	East Lansing	8.748	14.079	9	Trowbridge Road	
Ingham	Lansing	10.912	17.561	11	Dunckel Road, Jolly Road	
Ingham	Delhi Township	11.907	19.162	—	I-96 – Detroit, Grand Rapids US 127 south – Jackson	Exit 106 on I-96; exit 73 on US 127; freeway continues south as US 127
1.000 mi = 1.609 km; 1.000 km = 0.621 mi: Concurrency terminus; Incomplete access

== Related trunkline ==
Capitol Loop
- Location: Lansing
- Length: 2.381 mi (3.832 km)
- Existed: October 13, 1989–March 26, 2024

The Capitol Loop was a state trunkline highway running through Lansing that was commissioned on October 13, 1989. It formed a loop route off I-496 through downtown near the Michigan State Capitol complex, home of the state legislature and several state departments. However, unlike other business loops in Michigan, it had unique reassurance markers—the signs that serve as regular reminders of the name and number of the highway. It was known internally at MDOT as Connector 496 for inventory purposes. The highway followed a series of one-way and two-way streets through downtown Lansing, directing traffic downtown to the State Capitol and other government buildings. Unlike the other streets downtown, the seven streets composing the Capitol Loop were under state maintenance and jurisdiction.

The loop was originally proposed in 1986 as part of a downtown revitalization effort. Almost from the beginning before the highway was commissioned in 1989, it was affected by controversial proposals. The first was related to suggestions by community leaders to rename city streets in honor of Martin Luther King Jr. Another controversy dealt with rebuilding the streets as part of a downtown beautification project; the downtown business community protested the original scope of construction, and the Lansing City Council threatened to cancel the project in response to the controversy. In 2010, additional controversies surfaced regarding the posting and enforcement of speed limits on city streets in Michigan, including the streets that make up the Capitol Loop.

The length of the Capitol Loop that ran independent of BL I-96 was transferred to the City of Lansing on March 26, 2024. The city has been converting streets from one-way traffic to two-way since 2022, including plans to convert Ottawa and Allegan streets during 2024. With the transfer, the Capitol Loop designation was removed from the state highway system.
