= Lansing Central United Methodist Church =

Historic church in Michigan, United States

- Central Methodist Episcopal Church
- U.S. National Register of Historic Places
- Michigan State Historic Site
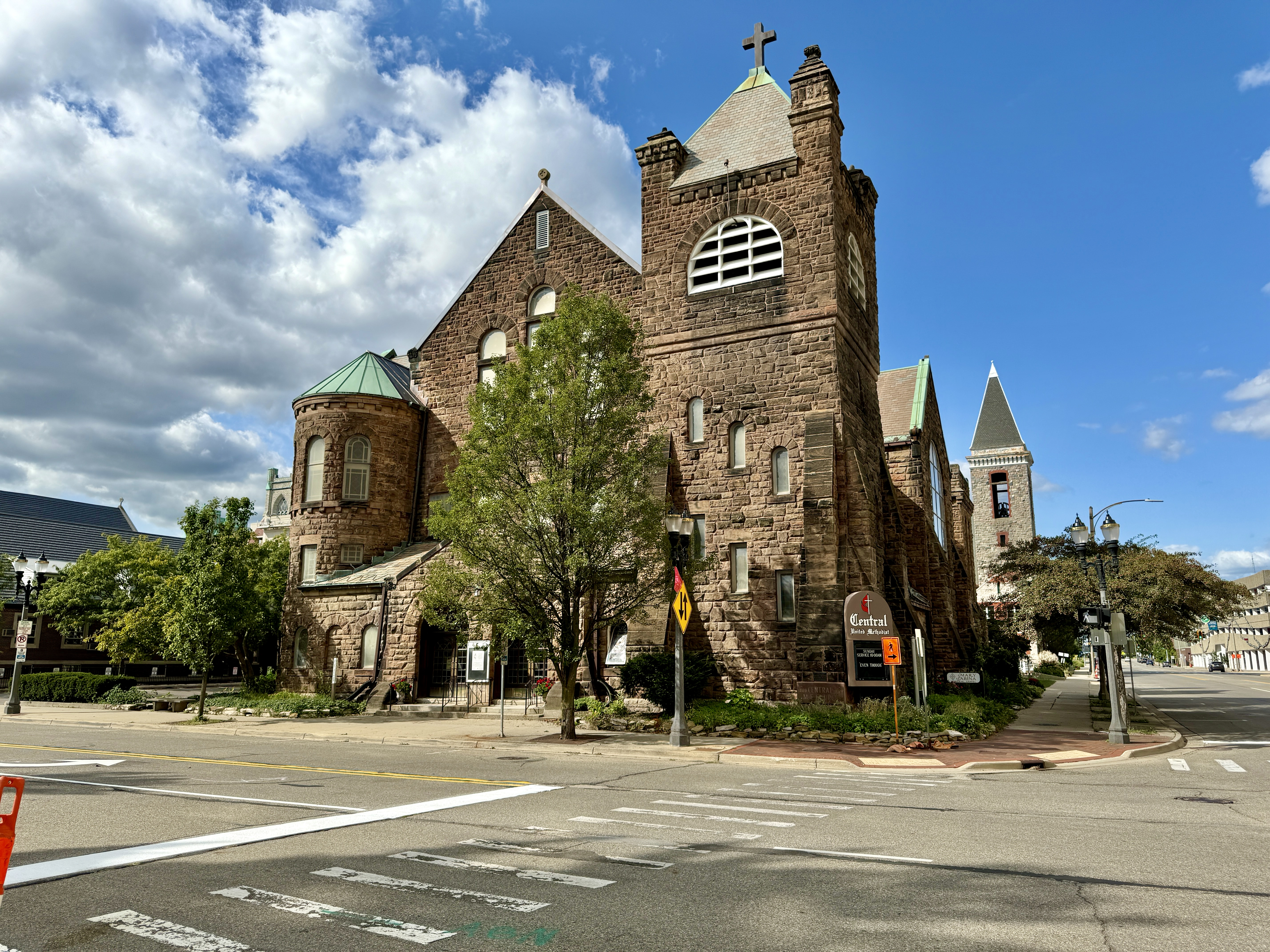
- Interactive map of Central Methodist Episcopal Church
- Location: 215 N. Capitol Ave., Lansing, Michigan
- Coordinates: 42°44′6″N 84°33′16″W
- Area: 1 acre (0.40 ha)
- Built: 1889
- Built by: H.W. Coddington
- Architect: Elijah E. Myers; Lee Black
- Architectural style: Richardsonian Romanesque
- MPS: Downtown Lansing MRA
- NRHP reference No.: 80001864

Significant dates
- Added to NRHP: September 17, 1980
- Designated MSHS: March 19, 1980

The Lansing Central United Methodist Church is a historic church located at 215 North Capitol Avenue in Lansing, Michigan. It was listed on the National Register of Historic Places in 1980 as the Central Methodist Episcopal Church.

== History ==
The first meeting of Methodists in the Lansing area occurred in 1845. In 1861, Central Methodist Episcopal Church was officially organized as an offshoot of the First Methodist Episcopal Church in North Lansing, and the congregation purchased a lot on the corner of what is now Ottawa and Washington to construct a church. The building was completed in 1863, but was quickly outgrown by the growing congregation. In 1882, the church bought a lot for a new church, located on the present church site. A number of architects were considered, and Elijah E. Myers, the architect of the Michigan State Capitol, was finally chosen. H.W. Coddington of Kalamazoo, Michigan was chosen as the builder, and construction commenced in 1889. Construction was completed in 1890 with the new building being formally dedicated on April 20, 1890.

A 4-story temple house, designed by Lee Black, was added onto the north end of the church in 1922-23. The temple house included a banquet hall in the basement, with an auditorium, offices, teaching rooms, lounge, small dormitory and recreation hall which included a bowling alley and basketball court in the floors above.

The Lansing Central Methodist Episcopal Church became Lansing Central United Methodist Church in 1968 when the national Evangelical United Brethren Church and Methodist Church (USA) merged to form the United Methodist Church.

== Description ==
The Central Methodist Episcopal Church is a low, massive, Richardsonian Romanesque structure built from dark red Ionia sandstone. The church measures one hundred fifty feet long by eighty-six feet wide. The main elevation is a broad facade with an eighty-five-foot high square tower located at one corner and a shorter half-round tower located at the other. Inside the church is a broad, open lobby with two U-shaped staircases leading to a second-floor lobby. A broad entryway leads to the sanctuary, which is a wide, low room containing a rear gallery and pews set in concentric rows around a low pulpit. The ceiling is supported by open timber trusses. All the trim is of red oak.

Also on the property is a Temple House, which is a utilitarian, three-story, brick structure faced with stonework which echoing that of the church. The Temple House contains the church offices, a two-story auditorium, Sunday school classrooms, and a gymnasium.
