= M-155 (Michigan highway) =

Unsigned state highway in Livingston County, Michigan, United States

M-155
- Old M-155
- M-155 highlighted in red

Route information
- Maintained by MDOT
- Length: 3.420 mi (5.504 km)
- Existed: 1931–present
- History: Last signed on a state map in 1991

Major junctions
- South end: Hillcrest Center (former Howell State Hospital)
- North end: BL I-96 in Howell

Location
- Country: United States
- State: Michigan
- Counties: Livingston

Highway system
- Michigan State Trunkline Highway System; Interstate; US; State; Byways
← M-154	→ M-156

M-155 was a signed state trunkline in the US state of Michigan that served as a spur route from Business Loop Interstate 96 (BL I-96) in Howell in Livingston County to the Hillcrest Center, the former Howell State Hospital. It was originally designated in the early 1930s and outlasted the hospital which closed in 1982. The roadway was removed from state maps after 1991 but remains under state maintenance as an unsigned trunkline listed as either M-155 or Old M-155.

== Route description ==
Old M-155 begins in front of the former state hospital on High Hillcrest Drive and runs north and northwesterly through a field and out of the property. The road passes some houses in the area as it curves onto Country Farm Road next to Sanatorium Lake, turning northward. From there, the trunkline follows Country Farm Road to Norton Road through Marion Township. The trunkline follows Norton Road east over the South Branch of the Shiawassee River and then northeasterly past a residential subdivision. Old M-155 then turns due east on Mason Road, running along the Marion–Howell township line before crossing into the city of Howell next to I-96. There is no interchange for the unsigned trunkline as it crosses over the freeway. The trunkline runs through more residential subdivisions before it turns northward onto Michigan Avenue. After one-half mile (0.80 km), the trunkline terminates at the intersection with BL I-96 (Grand River Avenue) in downtown Howell.

As the highway is still under state jurisdiction, M-155 is maintained by the Michigan Department of Transportation (MDOT). In 2011, the department's traffic surveys showed that on average, 13,699 vehicles used the highway daily in Howell and 3,960 vehicles did so each day near the southern terminus, the highest and lowest counts along the highway, respectively. No section of Old M-155 is listed on the National Highway System, a network of roads important to the country's economy, defense, and mobility.

== History ==
The Michigan State Sanatorium was opened on September 1, 1907, to treat adult patients with tuberculosis. Children were later treated there starting in 1915. After 1955 the hospital also handled patients with mental illnesses. In 1961 the sanatorium became the Howell State Hospital, and later the Hillcrest Center in 1978. The facility operated until September 30, 1982, when it was closed. and the building finally demolished a few years after. M-155 was designated in 1931; it began at the hospital and ran to a junction with US Highway 16 (modern BL I-96) in Howell. After the hospital was abandoned, the trunkline designation remained on the road. The designation last appeared on official state maps in 1991. The highway remains an unsigned trunkline.

== Major intersections ==
The entire highway is in Livingston County.

Location	mi	km	Destinations	Notes
Marion Township	0.000	0.000	High Hillcrest Drive	Access to former state hospital
Howell	3.420	5.504	BL I-96 – Lansing, Detroit	
1.000 mi = 1.609 km; 1.000 km = 0.621 mi
