= Downtown Lansing =

- Central business district
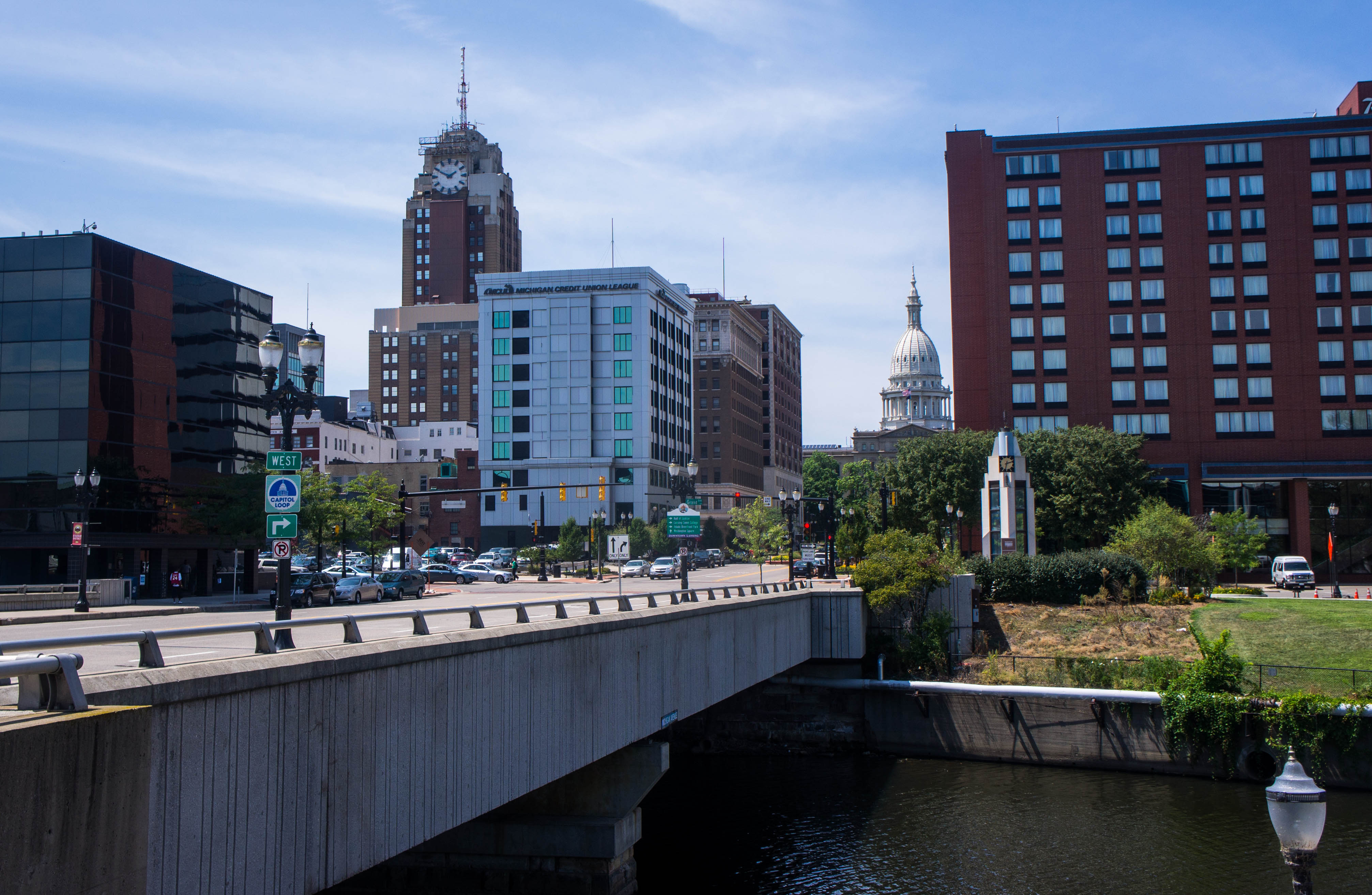
- Downtown Lansing, Michigan along Michigan Avenue
- Country: United States
- State: Michigan
- County: Ingham
- City: Lansing

Area
  - Total: 0.96 sq mi (2.48 km^{2})
- Highest elevation: 870 ft (270 m)
- Lowest elevation: 820 ft (250 m)

Population (2010)
  - Total: 4,847
  - Density: 4,407.9/sq mi (1,701.9/km^{2})
- Time zone: UTC-5 (EST)
  - Summer (DST): UTC-4 (EDT)
- ZIP code(s): 48915, 48933, 48912, 48906
- Area code: 517

Downtown Lansing is the central business district of Lansing, the capital of the U.S. state of Michigan. Located in the west-central part of the city along the banks of the Grand River, downtown Lansing is the primary home of the state's government and three colleges, and also contains sports facilities, museums, entertainment and retail, and a growing residential population.

== History ==
The area that would become downtown was part of the original plat of Lansing. When the city was chosen as the capital of Michigan in 1847, this area – known as Middle Town – was chosen as the site of the state capitol building, but the city's primary and older business district of Old Town – then known as Lower Town – would remain the dominant business district for another decade or so. The building of the first Michigan Avenue Bridge in 1848 and the relocation of the area's post office in 1851 expedited the growth of Middle Town.

== Overview ==
The boundaries of downtown Lansing are formally defined by one organization and one neighborhood association. Downtown Lansing Inc., a business improvement district, is the most narrow definition of the district, and only includes the office core of the downtown. Its boundaries are Larch Street on the east, St. Joseph Street to the south, Capitol Avenue to the west, and Shiawassee Street to the north. A 16-block portion of this area was added to the National Register of Historic Places as the Lansing Downtown Historic District on July 31, 2009.

The Downtown Lansing Neighborhood Association defines the district as being bounded by the Grand River to the east, I-496 to the south, MLK Boulevard to the west, and Oakland Avenue to the north. This neighborhood association actually overlaps and includes in full other neighborhood association boundaries. It overlaps parts of the Walnut and Old Forest neighborhoods to the north, and includes the neighborhoods of Cherry Hill in the southeast corner of the neighborhood, Renaissance in the southwest corner, and Genesee in the northwest corner.

== Government & infrastructure ==
The offices of the city's government are located in Lansing City Hall at the corner of West Michigan Avenue and Capitol Avenue across the street from the Michigan State Capitol, which is the seat of the state government. Despite not being the county seat, downtown Lansing is home to some Ingham County offices.

=== Transportation ===
Downtown is one of two hubs for the Capital Area Transportation Authority. The CATA Transportation Center (CTC) is the central and western hub of the system, and also intercity bus companies including Greyhound and Indian Trails.

== Education ==
There are no existing primary or secondary education facilities located in downtown.

=== Colleges & universities ===
Downtown is home to three institutions of higher learning. The largest is Lansing Community College, which reported an enrollment of 14,739 students for the 2020-21 academic year. Cooley Law School, the largest law school in the nation by enrollment, is located just south of the capitol. The Lansing campus of Davenport University, a private, non-profit university, is located in the Cherry Hill neighborhood of downtown, but is currently renovating a facility along East Allegan Avenue two blocks east of the capitol to relocate to.

=== Libraries ===
The headquarters and main library of the Capital Area District Library are located along Kalamazoo Street and Capitol Avenue. Library of Michigan & Historical Center is located along Kalamazoo Street in the west end of downtown. The library also includes the Archives of Michigan and State Law Library. Thomas E. Brennan Law Library, a part of Cooley Law School, sits at the corner of Kalamazoo and Washington Square in the central business district. It is one of the largest law libraries in the country.
