= Coopersville Area Public Schools =

School district in Michigan

Address
- 198 East St. Coopersville, Ottawa, Michigan, 49404; United States

District information
- Grades: Pre-Kindergarten-12
- Superintendent: Matt Spencer
- Schools: 6
- Budget: $47,442,000 2022-2023 expenditures
- NCES District ID: 2610830

Students and staff
- Students: 2,487 (2024-2025)
- Teachers: 150.59 (on an FTE basis) (2024-2025)
- Staff: 365.34 FTE (2024-2025)
- Student–teacher ratio: 16.52 (2024-2025)

Other information
- Website: coopersvillebroncos.org

Coopersville Area Public Schools is a public school district headquartered in Coopersville, Michigan, and serving portions of Ottawa and Muskegon counties in West Michigan. In Ottawa County, in addition to the city of Coopersville, it serves all of Polkton Township, most of Tallmadge and Wright townships, much of southwestern Chester Township (including Conklin) and a sliver of Crockery Township. In Muskegon County, it serves southwestern Ravenna Township and the southeast corner of Sullivan Township.

All five schools in the mostly rural district, along with the administrative offices, share a campus (and mailing address) at 198 East Street in Coopersville, although they are in different buildings.

== History ==
Coopersville's first school was built in 1853. It was painted brown and, therefore, called the Brown School. In 1869, a two-story brick school was built, which contained all grades. The high school graduated its first class in 1892.

The 1869 building was replaced in 1908. An addition was built in 1937, which contained the high school, while the lower grades were housed in the 1908 section. When the current high school was built in 1959, the former high school became a junior high school.

In 1970, the high school's home construction class built the district's administration building.

Construction began in November 1999 to renovate and expand the district's schools, paid for with a bond issue passed in March 1999. The renovated high school was dedicated in October, 2002. The first touring act to play at the high school's new performing arts center was Shemekia Copeland in 2003.

Coopersville Middle School opened in fall 2009.

== Schools ==
Schools in Coopersville Area Public Schools district
School	Notes
Coopersville High School	Grades 9-12. Built 1959, renovated 2002.
Coopersville Middle School	Grades 6-8. Built 2009.
South Elementary	Grades 4-5
East Elementary	Grades 2-3
West Early Childhood Center	Grades PreK-1
