= Michigan's 3rd congressional district =

U.S. House district for Michigan

Coordinates: 42°43′12″N 85°14′14″W

- Interactive map of district boundaries since January 3, 2023
- Representative: Hillary Scholten; D–Grand Rapids
- Distribution: 68.54% urban; 31.46% rural
- Population (2025): 797,671
- Median household income: $79,300
- Ethnicity: 70.1% White; 11.1% Black; 10.7% Hispanic; 4.4% Two or more races; 3.0% Asian; 0.7% other
- Cook PVI: D+4

Michigan's 3rd congressional district is a U.S. congressional district in West Michigan. From 2003 to 2013, it consisted of the counties of Barry and Ionia, as well as all except the northwestern portion of Kent, including the city of Grand Rapids. In 2012 redistricting, the district was extended to Battle Creek. In 2022, the district was condensed to the greater Grand Rapids and Muskegon areas, including portions of Kent, Muskegon, and Ottawa counties. Redistricting removed Barry, Calhoun, and Ionia counties.

The district is currently represented by Hillary Scholten, a member of the Democratic Party.

== Counties and municipalities ==
For the 118th and successive Congresses (based on redistricting following the 2020 census), the district contains all or portions of the following counties and municipalities:

Kent County (15)

Ada Township, Alpine Township, Byron Township, Cannon Township, Cascade Charter Township, East Grand Rapids, Gaines Charter Township, Grand Rapids, Grand Rapids Charter Township, Grandville, Kentwood, Plainfield Charter Township, Rockford, Walker, Wyoming

Muskegon County (12)

Fruitport, Fruitport Charter Township, Laketon Township (part; also 2nd), Muskegon, Muskegon Charter Township (part; also 2nd), Muskegon Heights, North Muskegon (part; also 2nd), Norton Shores, Ravenna, Ravenna Township, Roosevelt Park, Sullivan Township

Ottawa County (13)

Allendale Charter Township, Coopersville, Crockery Township, Ferrysburg, Georgetown Charter Township (part; also 2nd), Grand Haven, Grand Haven Charter Township, Polkton Charter Township, Robinson Township, Spring Lake, Spring Lake Township, Tallmadge Charter Township, Wright Township

== Recent election results from statewide races ==
Year	Office	Results
2008	President	Obama 52% - 46%
2012	President	Romney 51% - 48%
2014	Senate	Lynn Land 50% - 46%
2014	Governor	Snyder 59% - 38%
2014	Secretary of State	Johnson 60% - 36%
2014	Attorney General	Schuette 59% - 37%
2016	President	Clinton 46.9% - 46.8%
2018	Senate	Stabenow 51% - 47%
2018	Governor	Whitmer 52% - 45%
2018	Attorney General	Leonard 48% - 47%
2020	President	Biden 53% - 45%
2020	Senate	Peters 50% - 48%
2022	Governor	Whitmer 55% - 43%
2022	Secretary of State	Benson 57% - 41%
2022	Attorney General	Nessel 55% - 43%
2024	President	Harris 53% - 45%
2024	Senate	Slotkin 52% - 45%

== History ==
Prior to 1993, the 3rd congressional district largely consisted of Calhoun and Eaton counties, about half of Lansing and surrounding Ingham County, and most of Kalamazoo County (including the city of Kalamazoo, but not Portage and the adjacent south-ward township). With the redistricting, the old 3rd district was split between the 6th and 7th congressional districts, with Kalamazoo going to the 6th district and most of Lansing going to the 8th district. Meanwhile, the new 3rd district was redrawn to become the Grand Rapids-based district, covering much of the territory which had previously constituted the 5th district from 1873 to 1993.

No Democrat had represented Grand Rapids in Congress since Richard Vander Veen from 1974 to 1977, prior to redistricting due to the 1990 census, which took effect in 1993 and moved Grand Rapids from the 5th to the 3rd congressional district. However, following the 2020 census, the 3rd district was redrawn once again. It lost the more rural portions of Kent County, and was pushed westward to grab the more urban portion of Muskegon County along with northern Ottawa County, which had previously been in the 2nd district. In the 2022 midterm elections Democratic candidate Hillary Scholten was chosen to represent the district.

== List of members representing the district ==
Member	Party	Years	Cong ress	Electoral history	Location
District created March 4, 1843
James B. Hunt (Pontiac)	Democratic	March 4, 1843 – March 3, 1847	28th 29th	Elected in 1843. Re-elected in 1844. Retired.	1843–1853 [data missing]
Kinsley S. Bingham (Kensington)	Democratic	March 4, 1847 – March 3, 1851	30th 31st	Elected in 1846. Re-elected in 1848. Retired.	1843–1853 [data missing]
James L. Conger (Mount Clemens)	Whig	March 4, 1851 – March 3, 1853	32nd	Elected in 1850. Retired.	1843–1853 [data missing]
Samuel Clark (Kalamazoo)	Democratic	March 4, 1853 – March 3, 1855	33rd	Elected in 1852. Lost re-election.	1853–1863 [data missing]
David S. Walbridge (Kalamazoo)	Republican	March 4, 1855 – March 3, 1859	34th 35th	Elected in 1854. Re-elected in 1856. Retired.	1853–1863 [data missing]
Francis William Kellogg (Grand Rapids)	Republican	March 4, 1859 – March 3, 1863	36th 37th	Elected in 1858. Re-elected in 1860. Redistricted to the 4th district.	1853–1863 [data missing]
John W. Longyear (Lansing)	Republican	March 4, 1863 – March 3, 1867	38th 39th	Elected in 1862. Re-elected in 1864. Retired.	1863–1873 [data missing]
Austin Blair (Jackson)	Republican	March 4, 1867 – March 3, 1873	40th 41st 42nd	Elected in 1866. Re-elected in 1868. Re-elected in 1870. Retired to run for Governor of Michigan.	1863–1873 [data missing]
George Willard (Battle Creek)	Republican	March 4, 1873 – March 3, 1877	43rd 44th	Elected in 1872. Re-elected in 1874. Retired.	1873–1883 [data missing]
Jonas H. McGowan (Coldwater)	Republican	March 4, 1877 – March 3, 1881	45th 46th	Elected in 1876. Re-elected in 1878. Retired.	1873–1883 [data missing]
Edward S. Lacey (Charlotte)	Republican	March 4, 1881 – March 3, 1885	47th 48th	Elected in 1880. Re-elected in 1882. Retired.	1873–1883 [data missing]
Edward S. Lacey (Charlotte)	Republican	March 4, 1881 – March 3, 1885	47th 48th	Elected in 1880. Re-elected in 1882. Retired.	1883–1893 [data missing]
James O'Donnell (Jackson)	Republican	March 4, 1885 – March 3, 1893	49th 50th 51st 52nd	Elected in 1884. Re-elected in 1886. Re-elected in 1888. Re-elected in 1890. Redistricted to the 2nd district and lost re-election.	1883–1893 [data missing]
Julius C. Burrows (Kalamazoo)	Republican	March 4, 1893 – January 23, 1895	53rd 54th	Redistricted from the 4th district and re-elected in 1892. Re-elected in 1894. Resigned when elected U.S. Senator.	1893–1903 [data missing]
Vacant		January 23, 1895 – December 2, 1895	53rd 54th		1893–1903 [data missing]
Alfred Milnes (Coldwater)	Republican	December 2, 1895 – March 3, 1897	53rd 54th	Elected to finish Burrows's term. Lost re-election.	1893–1903 [data missing]
Albert M. Todd (Kalamazoo)	Democratic	March 4, 1897 – March 3, 1899	55th	Elected in 1896. Lost re-election.	1893–1903 [data missing]
Washington Gardner (Albion)	Republican	March 4, 1899 – March 3, 1911	56th 57th 58th 59th 60th 61st	Elected in 1898. Re-elected in 1900. Re-elected in 1902. Re-elected in 1904. Re-elected in 1906. Re-elected in 1908. Lost renomination.	1893–1903 [data missing]
Washington Gardner (Albion)	Republican	March 4, 1899 – March 3, 1911	56th 57th 58th 59th 60th 61st	Elected in 1898. Re-elected in 1900. Re-elected in 1902. Re-elected in 1904. Re-elected in 1906. Re-elected in 1908. Lost renomination.	1913–1933 [data missing]
John M. C. Smith (Charlotte)	Republican	March 4, 1911 – March 3, 1921	62nd 63rd 64th 65th 66th	Elected in 1910. Re-elected in 1912. Re-elected in 1914. Re-elected in 1916. Re-elected in 1918. Retired.	1913–1933 [data missing]
William H. Frankhauser (Hillsdale)	Republican	March 4, 1921 – May 9, 1921	67th	Elected in 1920. Died.	1913–1933 [data missing]
Vacant		May 9, 1921 – June 28, 1921	67th		1913–1933 [data missing]
John M. C. Smith (Charlotte)	Republican	June 28, 1921 – March 30, 1923	67th 68th	Elected to finish Frankhauser's term. Re-elected in 1922. Died.	1913–1933 [data missing]
Vacant		March 30, 1923 – June 19, 1923	68th		1913–1933 [data missing]
Arthur B. Williams (Battle Creek)	Republican	June 19, 1923 – May 1, 1925	68th 69th	Elected to finish Smith's term. Re-elected in 1924. Died.	1913–1933 [data missing]
Vacant		May 1, 1925 – August 18, 1925	69th		1913–1933 [data missing]
Joseph L. Hooper (Battle Creek)	Republican	August 18, 1925 – February 22, 1934	69th 70th 71st 72nd 73rd	Elected to finish Williams's term. Re-elected in 1926. Re-elected in 1928. Re-elected in 1930. Re-elected in 1932. Died.	1913–1933 [data missing]
Joseph L. Hooper (Battle Creek)	Republican	August 18, 1925 – February 22, 1934	69th 70th 71st 72nd 73rd	Elected to finish Williams's term. Re-elected in 1926. Re-elected in 1928. Re-elected in 1930. Re-elected in 1932. Died.	1933–1943 [data missing]
Vacant		February 22, 1934 – January 3, 1935	73rd		1933–1943 [data missing]
Henry M. Kimball (Kalamazoo)	Republican	January 3, 1935 – October 19, 1935	74th	Elected in 1934. Died.	1933–1943 [data missing]
Vacant		October 19, 1935 – December 17, 1935	74th		1933–1943 [data missing]
Verner Main (Battle Creek)	Republican	December 17, 1935 – January 3, 1937	74th	Elected to finish Kimball's term. Lost renomination.	1933–1943 [data missing]
Paul W. Shafer (Battle Creek)	Republican	January 3, 1937 – August 17, 1954	75th 76th 77th 78th 79th 80th 81st 82nd 83rd	Elected in 1936. Re-elected in 1938. Re-elected in 1940. Re-elected in 1942. Re-elected in 1944. Re-elected in 1946. Re-elected in 1948. Re-elected in 1950. Re-elected in 1952. Died.	1933–1943 [data missing]
Paul W. Shafer (Battle Creek)	Republican	January 3, 1937 – August 17, 1954	75th 76th 77th 78th 79th 80th 81st 82nd 83rd	Elected in 1936. Re-elected in 1938. Re-elected in 1940. Re-elected in 1942. Re-elected in 1944. Re-elected in 1946. Re-elected in 1948. Re-elected in 1950. Re-elected in 1952. Died.	1943–1953 [data missing]
Paul W. Shafer (Battle Creek)	Republican	January 3, 1937 – August 17, 1954	75th 76th 77th 78th 79th 80th 81st 82nd 83rd	Elected in 1936. Re-elected in 1938. Re-elected in 1940. Re-elected in 1942. Re-elected in 1944. Re-elected in 1946. Re-elected in 1948. Re-elected in 1950. Re-elected in 1952. Died.	1953–1963 [data missing]
Vacant		August 17, 1954 – January 3, 1955	83rd		1953–1963 [data missing]
August E. Johansen (Battle Creek)	Republican	January 3, 1955 – January 3, 1965	84th 85th 86th 87th 88th	Elected in 1954. Re-elected in 1956. Re-elected in 1958. Re-elected in 1960. Re-elected in 1962. Lost re-election.	1953–1963 [data missing]
August E. Johansen (Battle Creek)	Republican	January 3, 1955 – January 3, 1965	84th 85th 86th 87th 88th	Elected in 1954. Re-elected in 1956. Re-elected in 1958. Re-elected in 1960. Re-elected in 1962. Lost re-election.	1963–1973 [data missing]
Paul H. Todd Jr. (Kalamazoo)	Democratic	January 3, 1965 – January 3, 1967	89th	Elected in 1964. Lost re-election.	1963–1973 [data missing]
Garry E. Brown (Schoolcraft)	Republican	January 3, 1967 – January 3, 1979	90th 91st 92nd 93rd 94th 95th	Elected in 1966. Re-elected in 1968. Re-elected in 1970. Re-elected in 1972. Re-elected in 1974. Re-elected in 1976. Lost re-election.	1963–1973 [data missing]
Garry E. Brown (Schoolcraft)	Republican	January 3, 1967 – January 3, 1979	90th 91st 92nd 93rd 94th 95th	Elected in 1966. Re-elected in 1968. Re-elected in 1970. Re-elected in 1972. Re-elected in 1974. Re-elected in 1976. Lost re-election.	1973–1983 [data missing]
Howard Wolpe (Lansing)	Democratic	January 3, 1979 – January 3, 1993	96th 97th 98th 99th 100th 101st 102nd	Elected in 1978. Re-elected in 1980. Re-elected in 1982. Re-elected in 1984. Re-elected in 1986. Re-elected in 1988. Re-elected in 1990. Redistricted to the 6th district and retired.	1973–1983 [data missing]
Howard Wolpe (Lansing)	Democratic	January 3, 1979 – January 3, 1993	96th 97th 98th 99th 100th 101st 102nd	Elected in 1978. Re-elected in 1980. Re-elected in 1982. Re-elected in 1984. Re-elected in 1986. Re-elected in 1988. Re-elected in 1990. Redistricted to the 6th district and retired.	1983–1993 [data missing]
Paul B. Henry (Grand Rapids)	Republican	January 3, 1993 – July 31, 1993	103rd	Redistricted from the 5th district and re-elected in 1992. Died.	1993–2003
Vacant		July 31, 1993 – December 7, 1993	103rd		1993–2003
Vern Ehlers (Grand Rapids)	Republican	December 7, 1993 – January 3, 2011	103rd 104th 105th 106th 107th 108th 109th 110th 111th	Elected to finish Henry's term. Re-elected in 1994. Re-elected in 1996. Re-elected in 1998. Re-elected in 2000. Re-elected in 2002. Re-elected in 2004. Re-elected in 2006. Re-elected in 2008. Retired.	1993–2003
Vern Ehlers (Grand Rapids)	Republican	December 7, 1993 – January 3, 2011	103rd 104th 105th 106th 107th 108th 109th 110th 111th	Elected to finish Henry's term. Re-elected in 1994. Re-elected in 1996. Re-elected in 1998. Re-elected in 2000. Re-elected in 2002. Re-elected in 2004. Re-elected in 2006. Re-elected in 2008. Retired.	2003–2013
Justin Amash (Cascade Township)	Republican	January 3, 2011 – July 4, 2019	112th 113th 114th 115th 116th	Elected in 2010. Re-elected in 2012. Re-elected in 2014. Re-elected in 2016. Re-elected in 2018. Retired.	2003–2013
Justin Amash (Cascade Township)	Republican	January 3, 2011 – July 4, 2019	112th 113th 114th 115th 116th	Elected in 2010. Re-elected in 2012. Re-elected in 2014. Re-elected in 2016. Re-elected in 2018. Retired.	2013–2023
Justin Amash (Cascade Township)	Independent	July 4, 2019 – April 28, 2020	112th 113th 114th 115th 116th	Elected in 2010. Re-elected in 2012. Re-elected in 2014. Re-elected in 2016. Re-elected in 2018. Retired.	2013–2023
Justin Amash (Cascade Township)	Libertarian	April 28, 2020 – January 3, 2021	112th 113th 114th 115th 116th	Elected in 2010. Re-elected in 2012. Re-elected in 2014. Re-elected in 2016. Re-elected in 2018. Retired.	2013–2023
Peter Meijer (Grand Rapids)	Republican	January 3, 2021 – January 3, 2023	117th	Elected in 2020. Lost renomination.	2013–2023
Hillary Scholten (Grand Rapids)	Democratic	January 3, 2023 – present	118th 119th	Elected in 2022. Re-elected in 2024. Re-elected in 2026.	2023–present

== Recent election results ==
=== 2012 ===
Michigan's 3rd congressional district, 2012
Party	Candidate	Votes	%
Republican	Justin Amash (incumbent)	171,675	52.6
Democratic	Steve Pestka	144,108	44.2
Libertarian	Bill Gelineau	10,498	3.2
Independent	Steven Butler (write-in)	2	0.0
Total votes		326,283	100.0
Republican hold			

=== 2014 ===
Michigan's 3rd congressional district, 2014
Party	Candidate	Votes	%
Republican	Justin Amash (incumbent)	125,754	57.9
Democratic	Bob Goodrich	84,720	39.0
Green	Tonya Duncan	6,691	3.1
Total votes		217,165	100.0
Republican hold			

=== 2016 ===
Michigan's 3rd congressional district, 2016
Party	Candidate	Votes	%
Republican	Justin Amash (incumbent)	203,545	59.5
Democratic	Douglas Smith	128,400	37.5
U.S. Taxpayers'	Ted Gerrard	10,420	3.0
Total votes		342,365	100.0
Republican hold			

=== 2018 ===
Michigan's 3rd congressional district, 2018
Party	Candidate	Votes	%
Republican	Justin Amash (incumbent)	169,107	54.4
Democratic	Cathy Albro	134,185	43.2
U.S. Taxpayers'	Ted Gerrard	7,445	2.4
Independent	Joe Farrington (write-in)	3	0.0
Total votes		310,740	100.0
Republican hold			

=== 2020 ===
Michigan's 3rd congressional district, 2020
Party	Candidate	Votes	%
Republican	Peter Meijer	213,649	53.0
Democratic	Hillary Scholten	189,769	47.0
Independent	Richard Fuentes (write-in)	1	0.0
Total votes		403,419	100.0
Republican gain from Libertarian			

=== 2022 ===
Michigan's 3rd congressional district, 2022
Party	Candidate	Votes	%
Democratic	Hillary Scholten	185,989	54.8
Republican	John Gibbs	142,229	41.9
Libertarian	Jamie Lewis	6,634	1.9
Working Class	Louis Palus	4,136	1.2
Total votes		338,988	100.0
Democratic gain from Republican			

=== 2024 ===
Michigan's 3rd congressional district, 2024
Party	Candidate	Votes	%
Democratic	Hillary Scholten (incumbent)	225,510	53.7
Republican	Paul Hudson	183,952	43.8
Working Class	Louis Palus	5,546	1.3
Libertarian	Alex Avery	5,281	1.2
Total votes		420,289	100.0
Democratic hold			

== See also ==
- Michigan's congressional districts
- List of United States congressional districts
