= M-11 (Michigan highway) =

State highway in Ottawa and Kent counties in Michigan, United States

M-11
- M-11 highlighted in red

Route information
- Maintained by MDOT
- Length: 20.840 mi (33.539 km)
- Existed: 1961–present

Major junctions
- West end: I-96 near Marne
- M-45 at Walker; I-196 in Grand Rapids; US 131 at Wyoming; M-37 near Kentwood
- East end: I-96 near Cascade

Location
- Country: United States
- State: Michigan
- Counties: Ottawa, Kent

Highway system
- Michigan State Trunkline Highway System; Interstate; US; State; Byways
← M-10	→ US 12

M-11 is a state trunkline highway in the US state of Michigan in the Grand Rapids metropolitan area. The highway runs through the western and southern sides of the metro area, starting over the border in Ottawa County at an interchange with Interstate 96 (I-96). It runs through both rural woodlands and busy commercial areas before it terminates at another interchange with I-96 in Cascade Township. Locally known as Wilson Avenue and 28th Street, the trunkline is listed on the National Highway System. M-11 carries between 8,000 and 42,000 vehicles on average each day.

When the original state trunklines were designated, an M-11 ran the length of the Lake Michigan shoreline from the Indiana state line to Mackinaw City. That highway was replaced in 1926 by two of the then-newly created US Highways. A second highway was given the M-11 designation at that time in the Saline area. This highway was removed from the highway system and the designation decommissioned in 1954. The current M-11 was designated in 1961 along a set of roads in the Grand Rapids area that includes portions of a former route of US Highway 16 (US 16) in Michigan.

== Route description ==
The western terminus is at exit 24 on I-96, one mile (1.6 km) east of Marne. In Ottawa County, the road is called Ironwood Drive. Beginning at the Kent County border, the street is called Remembrance Road (in honor of those who died in battle). From its western terminus, the road angles southeast–northwest for about a mile and a half (2.4 km). Then M-11 turns south on Wilson Avenue to run north–south through Walker. Wilson Avenue intersects M-45 (Lake Michigan Drive) in the Standale Business District. South of Lake Michigan Drive, the trunkline continues on Wilson Avenue through the edge of a rural area. The highway runs through forest land near Millennium Park until it crosses the Grand River at I-196.

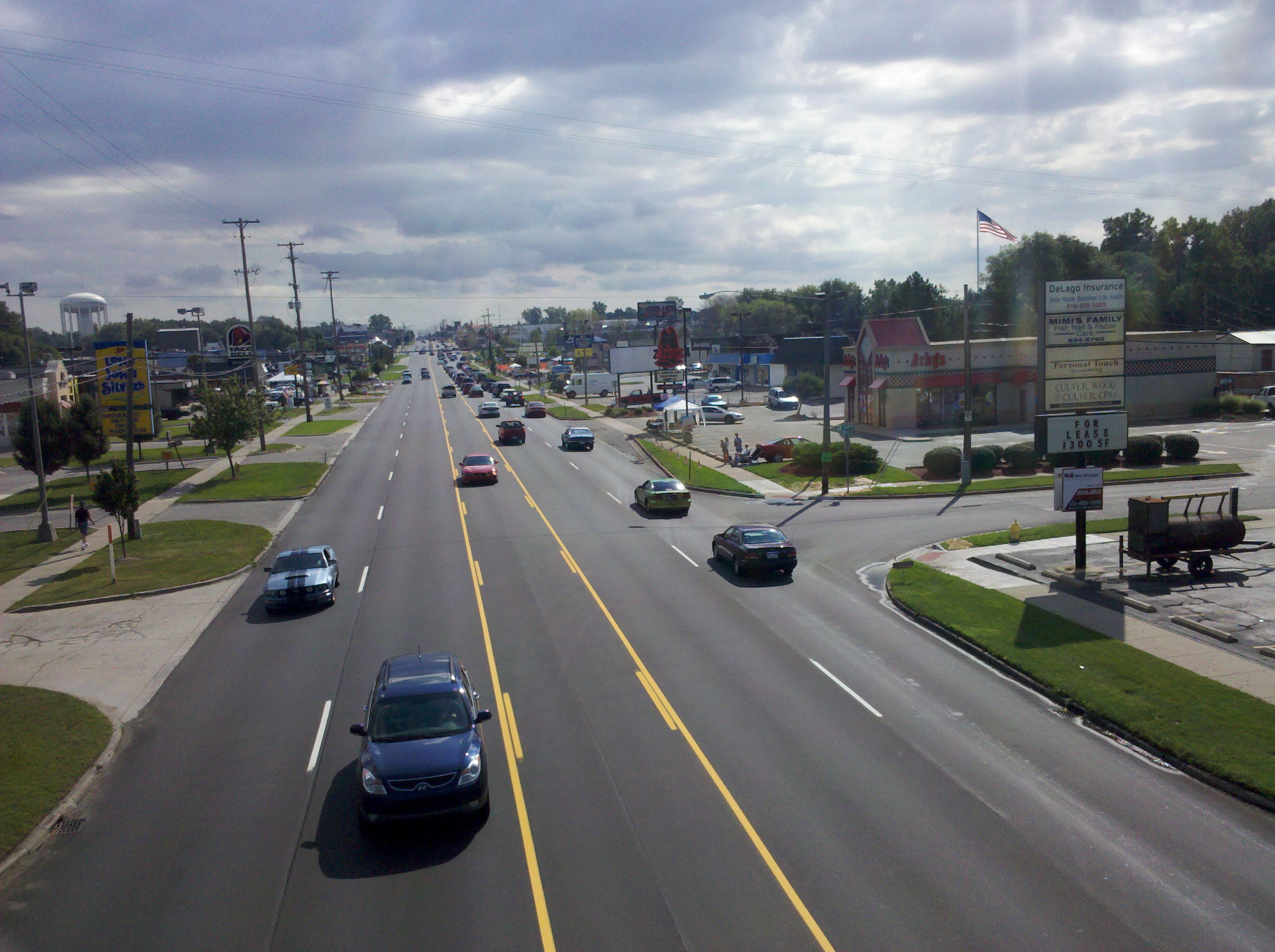
View looking east down 28th Street in Wyoming

Past I-196, M-11 curves to run east–west and becomes 28th Street. Wilson continues southwards as a local road and 28th Street is the route through Grandville and Wyoming. Chicago Drive runs under 28th Street in Grandville; there is a ramp from eastbound Chicago Drive to eastbound 28th Street, but all other connections are through the "28th Street Cutoff" to the east of the grade-separated junction. Continuing eastward through Wyoming, M-11 passes through that city's central business district. The highway intersects US Highway 131 and crosses into Grand Rapids at Division Avenue. Near Kalamazoo Avenue, 28th Street passes the Indian Hills Golf Course. From Breton Avenue eastward, 28th Street is dominated by retail establishments as it continues into Kentwood. M-11 meets an intersection with East Beltline Avenue near the Woodland Mall. East Beltline carries M-37 through the eastern side of the Grand Rapids metro area. M-11 continues eastward to its terminus at exit 44 on I-96 while 28th Street continues farther east to Cascade Road.

M-11 is maintained by the Michigan Department of Transportation (MDOT) like other state highways in Michigan. As a part of these maintenance responsibilities, the department tracks the volume of traffic that uses the roadways under its jurisdiction. These volumes are expressed using a metric called annual average daily traffic, which is a statistical calculation of the average daily number of vehicles on a segment of roadway. MDOT's surveys in 2010 showed that the highest traffic levels along M-11 were the 41,214 vehicles daily between Kalamazoo and Breton avenues in Grand Rapids; the lowest counts were the 8,153 vehicles per day in Ottawa County. All of M-11 has been listed on the National Highway System, a network of roads important to the country's economy, defense, and mobility.

== History ==
=== Previous designations ===
The first M-11 originally ran along Lake Michigan between the Indiana state line near New Buffalo and Mackinaw City on July 1, 1919. On November 11, 1926, the New Buffalo–Benton Harbor segment was used for US 12 and the Watervliet–Mackinaw City section was used for US 31; between Benton Harbor and Watervliet, M-11 was used for a concurrent US 12/US 31. Streets are still designated as Old M-11 in places such as Chikaming Township.

Immediately after the debut of the U.S. Highway System in 1926, M-11 was designated from M-50 at Napoleon to US 112 in Saline. The last section of this highway was fully paved between Bridgewater and Saline in late 1948 or early 1949. In the middle of 1954, M-92 was extended southward from Chelsea to Manchester. From there, that highway replaced M-11 west to Bridgewater before turning south to Clinton; at the same time, the remainder of M-11 was removed from the state highway system and the designation was decommissioned.

=== Current designation ===
The current M-11 was known as Beales Road in the early 1900s and was a sandy road placed over hills where it ended just west of Byron Center Avenue at gravel pits. The modern highway was added to the state highway system as a component of M-114 c. 1930. By 1942, the trunkline was completed and reassigned a Bypass US 16 designation, until the mainline US 16 was rerouted over the bypass in 1953. In the latter half of 1961, the M-11 designation was first assigned in the Grand Rapids area along the current routing when US 16 was moved to the newly opened I-96 freeway. The routing has remained unchanged since.

=== Memorial designations ===
The current M-11 follows Remembrance Road, Wilson Avenue and 28th Street. The first two of these names were chosen to memorialize the roadway in honor of local people. Remembrance Road was dedicated in 1923 on the initiative of the local chapter of the Daughters of the American Revolution. They planted 231 elms in a double row on each side of the highway and erected a boulder bearing a bronze plaque dedicated to the veterans of Kent County. Wilson Avenue was named for Samuel H. Wilson, a local realtor. He had developed a series of local residential subdivisions in the area up until his 1931 death, In 1942, the county road commission named Wilson Avenue in his honor to comply with a state law requiring roads that benefitted from state funds to have proper names.

== Major intersections ==
County	Location	mi	km	Destinations	Notes
Ottawa	Wright–Tallmadge township line	0.000– 0.649	0.000– 1.044	I-96 – Muskegon, Grand Rapids	Exits 24 (eastbound) and 25 (westbound) on I-96
Kent	Walker	5.004	8.053	M-45 (Lake Michigan Drive) – Allendale, Grand Rapids	
Kent	Grandville	9.187– 9.206	14.785– 14.816	I-196 (G.R. Ford Freeway) – Holland, Grand Rapids	Exit 70 on I-196
Kent	Grandville	9.947	16.008	Chicago Drive	Grade separation with a ramp from eastbound Chicago Drive to eastbound 28th Street; remaining connections are made via Wallace Avenue
Kent	Wyoming	13.644– 13.655	21.958– 21.976	US 131 – Kalamazoo, Grand Rapids	Exit 81 on US 131
Kent	Grand Rapids	14.242	22.920	A-45 south / Division Avenue – Kalamazoo	Northern terminus of A-45, the former US 131
Kent	Kentwood	18.430	29.660	M-37 – Hastings, Grand Rapids	
Kent	Cascade Township	20.817– 20.840	33.502– 33.539	I-96 – Grand Rapids, Lansing	Exit 43 on I-96; roadway continues eastward as 28th Street
1.000 mi = 1.609 km; 1.000 km = 0.621 mi: Incomplete access

== See also ==
- M-6, the current South Beltline around Grand Rapids
