= Eastmanville, Michigan =

- Unincorporated community
- Location within the state of Michigan
- Coordinates: 43°01′01″N 85°57′23″W
- Country: United States
- State: Michigan
- County: Ottawa
- Township: Polkton
- Elevation: 600 ft (180 m)
- Time zone: UTC-5 (Eastern (EST))
  - Summer (DST): UTC-4 (EDT)
- Area code: 616
- GNIS feature ID: 625294

Eastmanville is an unincorporated community at the southern edge of Polkton Township of Ottawa County in the U.S. state of Michigan.

== Geography ==
It is centered on the intersection of 68th Ave. and Leonard St. on the north bank of the Grand River at 43°01′00″N 85°57′23″W. 68th Ave. was the first bridge over the Grand River east of Grand Haven until October, 2015, when the first span of the bypass bridge was opened in Robinson Township. A junction with I-96 in Coopersville is three miles to the north and M-45 in Allendale is three miles south. Westbound Leonard goes to Spring Lake, while eastbound goes to Grand Rapids.

== History ==
The first white settler in the community was Dr. George W. Scranton, who went there in 1835. The place was at first known as Scranton. A post office by that name opened on July 11, 1838 with Dr. Scranton as postmaster. The office closed on March 1, 1842. However, another early settler had a more lasting influence on the community. Dr. Timothy Eastman of Maine moved to Grand Haven in 1835, where he established a medical practice. Eastman moved to Scranton in 1842. The state legislature organized Polkton Township, named after U.S. President James K. Polk, on March 19, 1845. The first township meeting took place at Eastman's residence on April 17, 1845. Eastman was elected Township Supervisor for several years afterwards, as well as serving as a county judge and various other township offices and continuing his medical practice. He also became the first postmaster of Polkton on May 28, 1846.

With his sons, Galen and Mason, Eastman platted the village of Eastmanville in 1855. On March 8, 1856, the name of the Polkton post office was changed to Eastmanville. In 1857, Eastmanville nearly became the county seat, having gained the assent of the County Board of Supervisors, but was unable to secure popular support.

Although initially prosperous, Eastmanville was soon outpaced by Coopersville, when a railway route developed through that town. Eastmanville had been offered a deal by the Detroit and Milwaukee Railway but turned it down. Benjamin Cooper offered a right-of-way through his 640-acres, provided that the depot on his land was the only one within five or six miles in any direction. A 1941 Michigan Writers Project publication described the community as "a small colony of summer homes on the north bank of the Grand River." (The writers group apparently ignored the permanence of several homes and at least one farm in Eastmanville by characterizing it as constituted of "summer homes.")

A carved stone at the northeast corner explains the area's history.
