= Polkton =

Polkton can refer to:

- Polkton Township, Michigan
- Polkton, North Carolina
