= Grand Valley =

Grand Valley may refer to:

United States

- Grand Valley (Colorado-Utah), along the Colorado River
  - Grand Valley AVA, Colorado wine region
  - Grand Valley, Colorado, town now named Parachute, Colorado
- Grand Valley, Michigan
- Grand Valley, Pennsylvania
- Grand Valley State University in Allendale, Michigan
  - Grand Valley State Lakers, this school's athletic program

Canada

- Grand Valley, Ontario
- Grand Valley, Saskatchewan

Indonesia

- Grand Valley, better known as the Baliem Valley, Western New Guinea, home of the Dani people

Fictional

- Grand Valley Speedway, a track in the Gran Turismo series of videogames
