= Chester Township, Ottawa County, Michigan =

Chester Township, Michigan
- Civil township
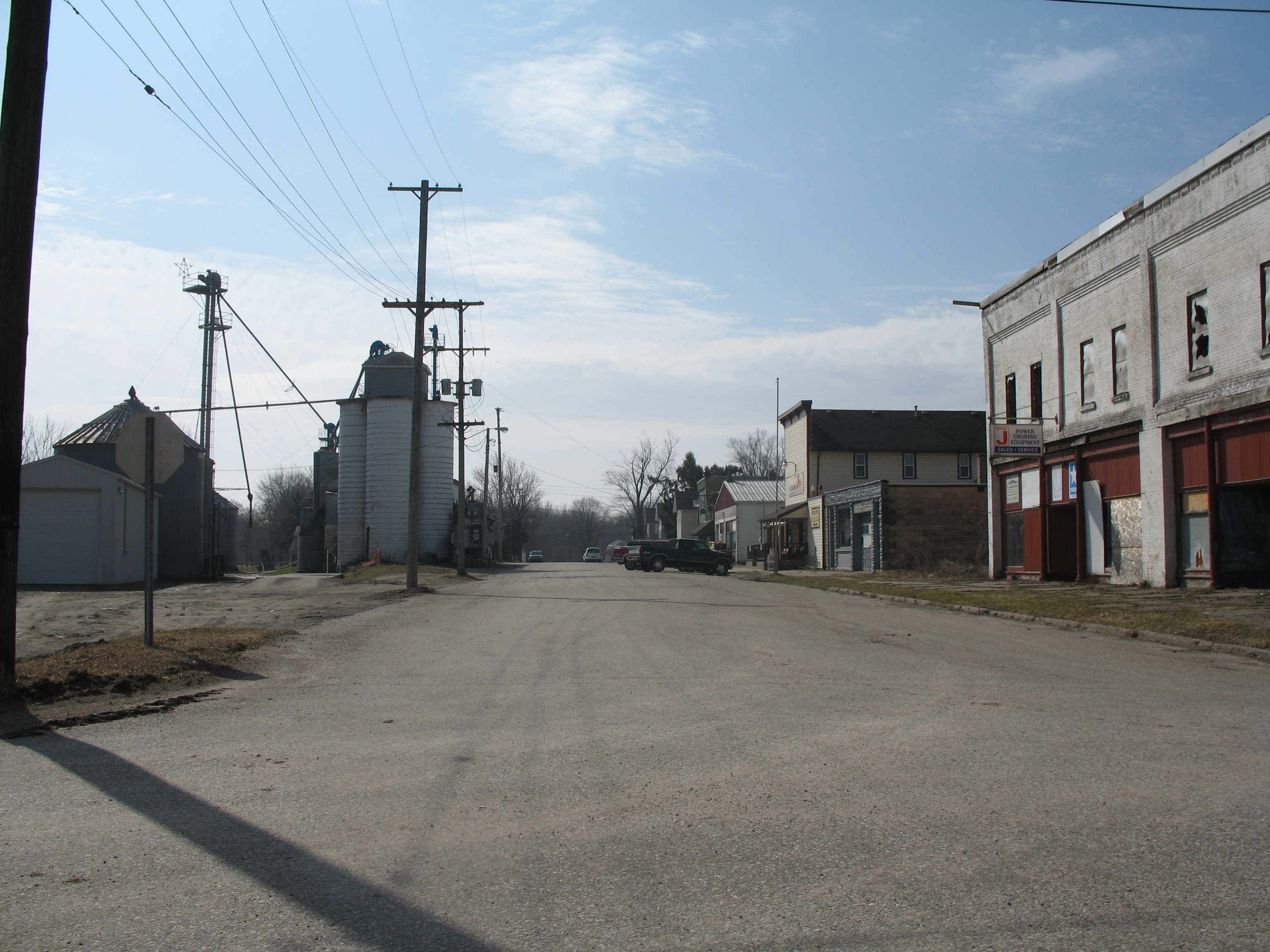
- Unincorporated community of Conklin

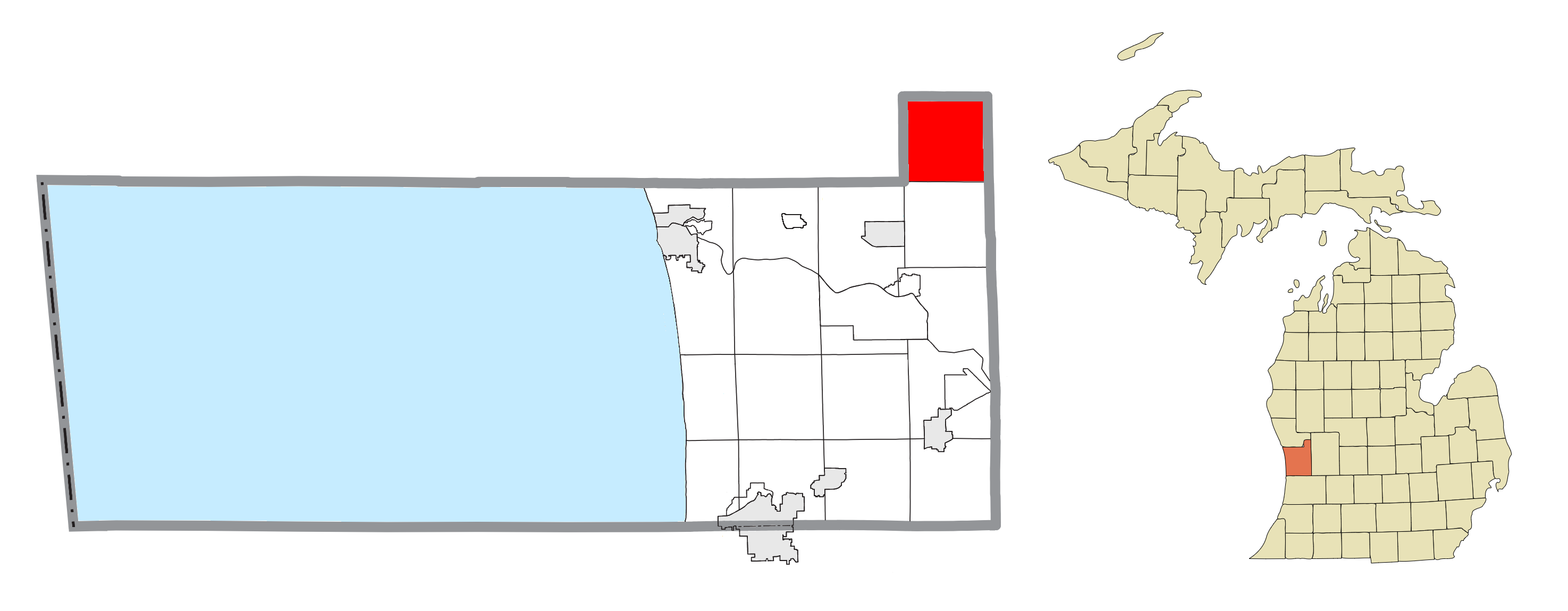
- Location within Ottawa County

- Location within the state of Michigan Location within the United States
- Coordinates: 43°09′42″N 85°51′04″W
- Country: United States
- State: Michigan
- County: Ottawa
- Established: 1839

Government
  - Supervisor: Gary Meerman
  - Clerk: Helen Dietrich

Area
  - Total: 35.82 sq mi (92.77 km^{2})
  - Land: 35.63 sq mi (92.28 km^{2})
  - Water: 0.19 sq mi (0.49 km^{2})
- Elevation: 720 ft (220 m)

Population (2020)
  - Total: 2,096
  - Density: 59.3/sq mi (22.9/km^{2})
- Time zone: Eastern
- ZIP code(s): 49318 (Casnovia); 49330 (Kent City); 49345 (Sparta); 49403 (Conklin); 49451 (Ravenna)
- Area code: 616
- FIPS code: 26-15300
- GNIS feature ID: 1626073
- Website: Official website

Chester Township is a civil township of Ottawa County in the U.S. state of Michigan. As of the 2020 United States census, the township population was 2,096.

== Communities ==
There are no incorporated municipalities within the township. There are a few unincorporated communities and homeowners associations:

- Conklin, in the southwest part of the township at 43°07′44″N 85°52′53″W was a station on the Grand Rapids and Indiana Railroad, with its post office first opening in June 1887 and continues to service most of the township with ZIP code 49403.
- Crockery Lake, a homeowners' association on Crockery Lake near the center of the township.
- Harrisburg, on the north branch of Crockery Creek in the northwest of the township at 43°11′31″N 85°52′26″W, was a station on the Toledo, Saginaw and Muskegon Railway, with a post office operating from December 1888 until February 1907.
- Gooding, on the eastern boundary with Sparta Township in Kent County, was a station on the Toledo, Saginaw and Muskegon Railway in Kent County. A post office was established in November 1888 and named after storekeeper/postmaster Richard J. Gooding. In June 1918, the post office was transferred to a site on the Ottawa County side and remained in operation until January 1923. The most noticeable remnant of Gooding is Gooding Street, which runs east–west across the township, passing just south of Crockery Lake. The street continues as 13 Mile Road in Kent County and as Ellis Road in Muskegon County.
- Lisbon, a mile south of Gooding, was settled by New Yorker John Pintler (1846). In 1848, Pintler's Corners Post Office was established; in 1859 the name of the Post Office was changed to Lisbon. In March 1869, a village was incorporated, extending a half-section in each direction from the northwest corner of section 30 of Sparta Township (thus including a quarter section of section 19 to the north in Sparta Township as well as quarter sections of sections 24 and 25 in Chester Township. However, railroad lines bypassed the village and it did not prosper, eventually disincorporating.

== Geography ==
The township protrudes to the north of the rest of Ottawa County, and is bounded on the west and north by Muskegon County and on the east by Kent County. Polkton Township lies to the southwest and Wright Township to the south.

No major roads pass through the township, although Interstate 96 passes just to the south. The city of Coopersville is just a few miles to the southwest. Grand Haven is about 20 miles (32 km) to the west, while Grand Rapids is about 15 miles (24 km) to the southeast.

The northern part of the township is drained by the north branch of Crockery Creek, a tributary of the Grand River that flows mostly westward in the township. The southern portion is drained by branches of Rio Grande Creek, which flow mostly westward before joining Crockery Creek just south of Ravenna. A small area in the southwest corner is drained by Beaver Creek, which flows mostly south into Deer Creek just about a mile before Deer Creek enters the Grand River in Polkton Township. A small area in the southeast of the township is drained by Nash Creek, which flows east to the Rogue River. Crockery Lake, on the Crockery Creek near the center of the township, is the only sizeable body of water in the township. The highest point in Conklin is approximately 1-mile (1.6 km) from Crockery Lake by Gooding Street and 24th Avenue.

According to the United States Census Bureau, the township has a total area of 35.9 square miles (93 km^{2}), of which 35.7 square miles (92 km^{2}) is land and 0.2 square miles (0.52 km^{2}) (0.47%) is water.

Grose Park is a 40-acre (160,000 m^{2}) county park overlooking the north side of Crockery Lake and provides recreational opportunities including swimming, fishing, sand volleyball and picnicking. There is about one mile (1.6 km) of hiking trails along Lange Creek. Major improvements were made in 2000 to Grose Park as part of a $660,000 renovation with about 60% of the funding coming from the Michigan Natural Resources Trust Fund.

Zip Codes

- Conklin-49403

School Districts

- Sparta Area Schools
- Kent City Community Schools
- Ravenna Public Schools
- Coopersville Public Schools

== Demographics ==
As of the 2000 United States census, there were 2,315 people, 714 households, and 579 families in the township. The population density was 64.9 inhabitants per square mile (25.1/km^{2}). There were 793 housing units at an average density of 22.2 per square mile (8.6/km^{2}). The racial makeup of the township was 94.43% White, 0.78% African American, 0.13% Native American, 0.22% Asian, 3.63% from other races, and 0.82% from two or more races. Hispanic or Latino of any race were 6.22% of the population.

There were 714 households, out of which 41.3% had children under the age of 18 living with them, 70.3% were married couples living together, 6.7% had a female householder with no husband present, and 18.9% were non-families. 14.7% of all households were made up of individuals, and 4.8% had someone living alone who was 65 years of age or older. The average household size was 2.99 and the average family size was 3.32.

The township population contained 30.9% under the age of 18, 7.9% from 18 to 24, 31.1% from 25 to 44, 18.5% from 45 to 64, and 11.6% who were 65 years of age or older. The median age was 35 years. For every 100 females, there were 104.9 males. For every 100 females age 18 and over, there were 103.0 males.

The median income for a household in the township was $46,328, and the median income for a family was $51,900. Males had a median income of $39,286 versus $27,159 for females. The per capita income for the township was $18,197. About 6.0% of families and 10.4% of the population were below the poverty line, including 9.0% of those under age 18 and 4.1% of those age 65 or over.
