= Musketawa Trail =

Hiking trail

- Length: 25 mi (40 km)
- Location: Lower Peninsula, Muskegon County, Ottawa County, Michigan USA
- Trailheads: Marne, Michigan; Ravenna, Michigan; Muskegon, Michigan
- Use: Cycling, Equestrian, Hiking, Snow-mobiling, XC skiing
- Difficulty: Easy
- Season: All
- Surface: Asphalt
- Website: Official website
- Bike trail route highlighted in red
Trail map

The Musketawa Trail is a rail trail in Western Michigan along the former Muskegon, Grand Rapids and Indiana Railroad line. Stretching 25 miles (40 km) from Marne to Muskegon, the trail passes through the towns of Conklin and Ravenna. Trail development came from the Michigan Department of Natural Resources and the Friends of the Musketawa Trail.

== Waypoints ==
Waypoints for the Musketawa Trail. ↑ in the Distance column points to the other waypoint that the distance is between.

Location	Services	Distance (approx.)	Coordinates
Muskegon, Michigan	Parking, Restroom		43°12′07″N 86°10′14″W
Waypoint 2	Vending, Restroom	↑ 2.2 miles (3.5 km)	43°11′30″N 86°07′44″W
Ravenna, Michigan	Parking, Restroom	↑ 9.2 miles (14.8 km)	43°11′02″N 85°56′50″W
Conklin, Michigan	Parking, Restroom	↑ 5.2 miles (8.4 km)	43°07′34″N 85°52′54″W
Marne, Michigan	Parking, Restroom	↑ 6.6 miles (10.6 km)	43°02′51″N 85°48′31″W
