= Mary Hefferan =

American bacteriologist (1873–1948)

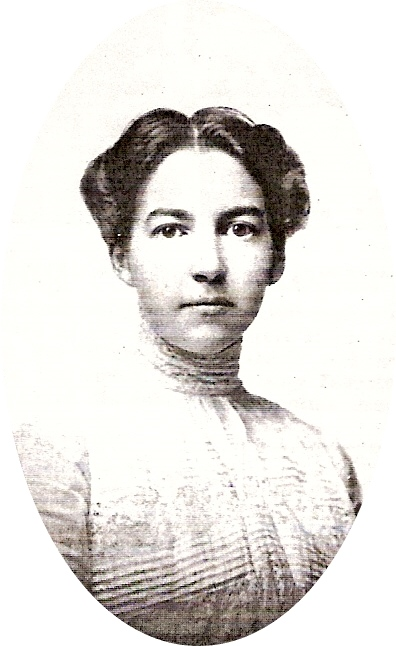
- Mary Hefferan, c. 1896–1898
- Born: June 24, 1873; Eastmanville, Michigan, U.S.
- Died: July 20, 1948 (aged 75); Eastmanville, Michigan
- Occupations: Biologist, community leader

Mary Hefferan (June 24, 1873 – July 20, 1948) was an American bacteriologist and community leader. She earned her PhD in zoology in 1903 From the University of Chicago.

== Life and work ==
Mary Hefferan was born in Eastmanville, Ottawa County, Michigan. After her father became successful in the lumbar industry her family moved to the Grand Rapids, where she graduated from Central High School. She then attended Wellesley College in Massachusetts, and earned her bachelor's and master's degrees there in 1896 and 1898, respectively. She received her PhD in zoology from the University of Chicago in 1903 with a dissertation on bacteriology. In 1904 her doctoral dissertation titled, A Comparative And Experimental Study Of Bacilli Producing Red Pigment was published. Hefferan published papers over a variety of topics, including: Biology and Microbiology, Infectious Disease, Botany, and Zoology.

After the completion of her PhD, she remained at the University of Chicago as the curator of the bacteriology museum and taught for seven years in the department of bacteriology. According to Laug, the board of trustees' minutes indicate that she earned $500 a year, a rare display for a female scientist in the early 1900’s She was also acting editor of the Botanical Gazette, where she published 22 articles between October 1900 and December 1909. The Botanical Gazette was a scientific journal published by the University of Chicago that focused on research in plant sciences. In 1992 the name was changed to The International Journal of Plant Sciences, which still exists today.

Hefferan left Chicago for Grand Rapids in 1910. In the span of five years, after the passing of her mother and brother, she moved into her deceased brother's home and gained custody of his two sons. She never wed, but adopted her own son, Albert.

Upon moving back, Mary became involved with social service work. She helped with the creation of the D.A. Blodgett Home for Children in Grand Rapids, and was elected to its board of directors in 1915. She worked heavily with the Federation for Social Agencies, which was eventually renamed the Community Chest. In 1918 Hefferan served on the Woman's Committee of the Council of National Defense. In 1942 she was the first woman to receive the Community Chest Award, which recognized her 25 years of public service.

== Publications ==
- Works by Mary Hefferan through the Botanical Gazette.
- Hefferan, Mary (December 1, 1900). "Variation in the Teeth of Nereis". Biological Bulletin. 2.
- Hefferan, Mary (1904). "A Comparative and Experimental Study of Bacilli Producing Red Pigment". University of California Libraries. Chicago.
- Hefferan, Mary; Jordan, E.O. "Observations on the Bionomics of Anopheles". The Journal of Infectious Diseases. 2. Oxford University Press: 56–69. JSTOR 30074289.
- Heinemann, P.G.; Hefferan, Mary (June 12, 1909). "A Study of Bacillus bulgaricus" (PDF). The Journal of Infectious Diseases. 6 (3). Oxford University Press: 304–318. JSTOR 30071770.
