= Interstate 96 =

Interstate Highway in Michigan, United States

Interstate 96
- I-96 highlighted in red

Route information
- Maintained by MDOT
- Length: 192.032 mi (309.046 km)
- Existed: 1959–present
- History: Completed November 21, 1977
- NHS: Entire route

Major junctions
- West end: US 31 in Norton Shores
- US 131 in Walker; I-196 in Grand Rapids; I-69 near Lansing; I-496 / US 127 in Lansing; US 23 in Brighton; I-275 / I-696 / M-5 in Farmington Hills; I-275 / M-14 near Livonia; US 24 in Redford; I-94 in Detroit
- East end: I-75 in Detroit

Location
- Country: United States
- State: Michigan
- Counties: Muskegon, Ottawa, Kent, Ionia, Clinton, Eaton, Ingham, Livingston, Oakland, Wayne

Highway system
- Interstate Highway System; Main; Auxiliary; Suffixed; Business; Future; Michigan State Trunkline Highway System; Interstate; US; State; Byways
| ← M-95 | → BL I-96 |

Interstate 96 (I-96) is an east–west Interstate Highway that runs for approximately 192 miles (309 km) entirely within the Lower Peninsula of the US state of Michigan. The western terminus is at an interchange with US Highway 31 (US 31) and Business US 31 (Bus. US 31) on the eastern boundary of Norton Shores southeast of Muskegon, and the eastern terminus is at I-75 near the Ambassador Bridge in Detroit. From Grand Rapids through Lansing to Detroit, the freeway parallels Grand River Avenue, never straying more than a few miles from the decommissioned US 16. The Wayne County section of I-96 is named the Jeffries Freeway from its eastern terminus to the junction with I-275 and M-14. Though maps still refer to the freeway as the Jeffries, the portion within the city of Detroit was renamed by the state legislature as the Rosa Parks Memorial Highway in December 2005 in honor of the late civil rights pioneer. There are four auxiliary Interstates as well as two current and four former business routes associated with I-96.

Grand River Avenue originated as an Indian trail before Michigan statehood. It later was used as a wagon road across the state. The roadway was included in the State Trunkline Highway System in 1919 as M-16 and later the United States Numbered Highway System as US 16. Construction of a freeway along the length of the corridor was proposed in the 1940s, and included as part of the Interstate Highway System in the mid-1950s. This construction was started in 1956 and initially completed across the state to Detroit in 1962. The proposed route for the Jeffries Freeway in Detroit was moved in the 1960s; it was built in the 1970s. I-96 was completed on November 21, 1977, in the Detroit area, closing the last gap along the route. Since then, additional interchanges and lanes have been added in places to accommodate traffic needs.

== Route description ==
I-96 is maintained by the Michigan Department of Transportation (MDOT) as a segment of the larger State Trunkline Highway System. In 2011, the department's traffic surveys showed that on average, 201,200 vehicles used the highway daily between 6 and 7 Mile roads in Livonia. Near Norton Shores, 20,638 vehicles did so each day between Airline and Fruitport roads. These are the highest and lowest counts along the highway, respectively. As an Interstate Highway, all of I-96 is included in the National Highway System, a network of roads important to the country's economy, defense, and mobility. In addition, the highway in Detroit has been named the Rosa Parks Memorial Highway by the Michigan Legislature to honor the civil rights pioneer Rosa Parks. The segment from Livonia west to I-275 is the Jeffries Freeway, named for a former mayor of Detroit, Edward Jeffries.

=== Norton Shores to Grand Rapids ===
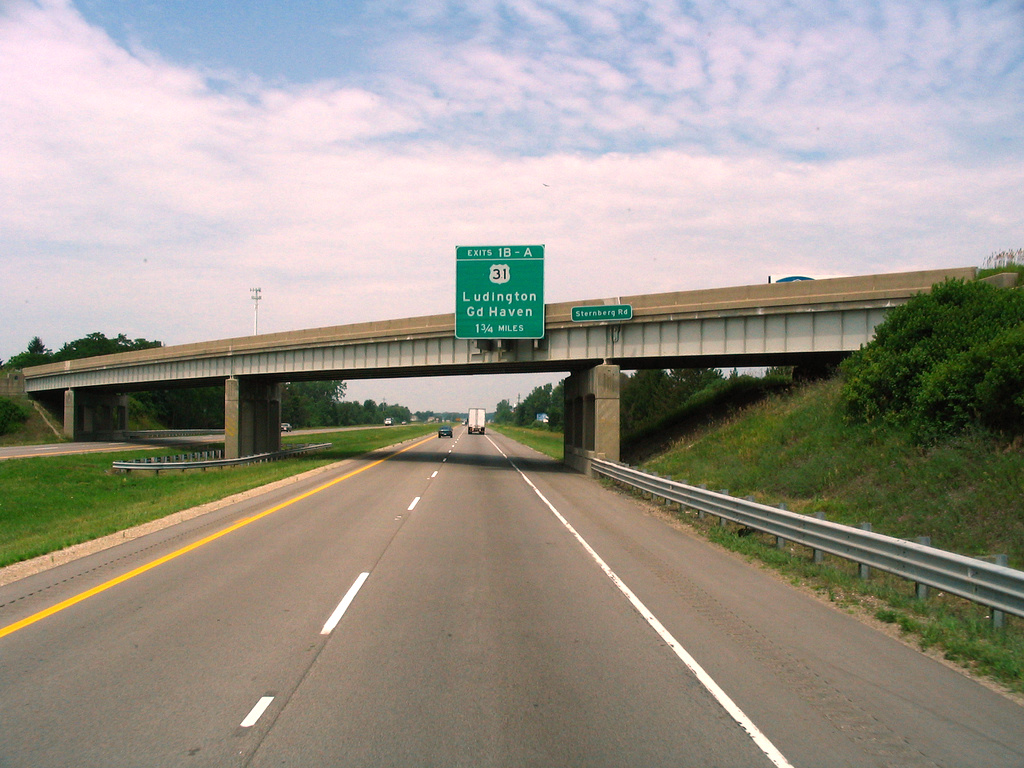
Westbound I-96 as it passes under Sternberg Road approaching US 31

I-96 begins at a three-quarter cloverleaf interchange with US 31 northeast of the Muskegon County Airport in Norton Shores, near Muskegon. At the starting terminus, the highway has a grassy median and two lanes in each direction as it travels southeasterly through rural Muskegon County. The freeway is paralleled by Airline Highway in an area with a mix of fields and residences as far as Fruitport. I-96 bypasses that village to the north and east before crossing into Ottawa County at Fruitport Road. After a distance of about five miles (8.0 km) in the county, the trunkline reaches Nunica. The highway crosses the Crockery Creek and turns eastward toward Coopersville. The freeway runs parallel to the Grand River, about 2.5 miles (4.0 km) to the north. Near Ironwood Drive, I-96 turns southeasterly again and goes through Marne.

Beyond Marne, I-96 passes the western end of M-11 and crosses into Kent County, curving around a rest area for the eastbound lanes. The freeway runs eastward through a light industrial area of the suburb of Walker as it enters the Grand Rapids metropolitan area. At the interchange with Alpine Avenue, M-37 merges onto the freeway and the two run concurrently past the studios for WZZM-TV with its iconic weatherball, a 16-foot-wide (4.9 m) sphere 100 feet (30 m) above the ground that uses colored lights to display a weather forecast. Adjacent to the studios are the ramps from eastbound I-96 to southbound US 131 and from northbound US 131 to westbound I-96. These ramps mark the northern end of I-296, an unsigned auxiliary Interstate Highway designation applied to them and the US 131 freeway south to downtown Grand Rapids. I-96 turns northeasterly past a commercial area to a three-quarter cloverleaf interchange that provides all of the other connections with US 131 next to a crossing of the Grand River.

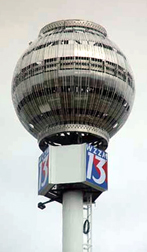
WZZM-TV's Weatherball next to I-96 in Walker

East of the river, I-96 and M-37 pass through the northern suburb of Comstock Park, intersecting Connector M-44 (Conn. M-44, Plainfield Avenue) near Lamberton Lake. Past that interchange, the freeway angles southeasterly and then southward, bypassing Grand Rapids to the northeast. East of downtown, I-96/M-37 meets I-196 (Gerald R. Ford Freeway) at a partial interchange; traffic headed eastbound on I-196 must enter I-96 eastbound and only westbound I-96 traffic may enter I-196. Immediately east of the interchange is another for M-44 (East Beltline Avenue) where M-37 separates from the freeway to turn southward. Through this series of interchanges, I-96 curves to the east and then turns back southward after passing through them. There are two more interchanges for M-21 (Fulton Street) and Cascade Road before I-96 meets the eastern end of M-11 at 28th Street. The next interchange for 36th Street provides access to the Gerald R. Ford International Airport. The freeway continues to the east of the airport and then intersects the eastern end of M-6 (Paul B. Henry Freeway, South Beltline Freeway) at an interchange over the Thornapple River.

=== Grand Rapids to Howell ===
The freeway exits the edges of the Grand Rapids urban area past the interchange with M-6, turning due east and paralleling the northern edge of Cascade Road. I-96 curves to the south of Pratt Lake near the county line, crossing into Ionia County. Grand River Avenue is the frontage road as the freeway heads east through farm fields. South of Ionia, I-96 intersects M-66. Near Portland, the trunkline turns to the southeast to cross the Grand River again. On the east side of town, the freeway crosses Grand River Avenue, its former business spur into town. I-96 continues southeasterly, crossing into Clinton County and passes the community of Eagle. Entering the western reaches of the Lansing metropolitan area, I-96 merges with I-69 and turns southward at an interchange in the southwestern corner of the county; this interchange also provides access to Business Loop I-96 (BL I-96, Grand River Avenue).

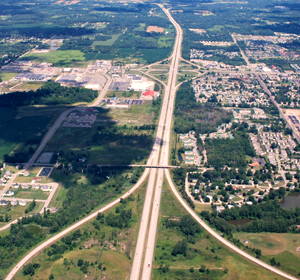
Aerial view looking north from the I-496 interchange along I-96/I-69 west of Lansing

These two Interstates run southward together for about 6.5 miles (10.5 km) on the west side of the metropolitan area, picking up a third lane in each direction. The exit numbers and mileposts along the concurrency reflect those of I-96, which is considered the dominant designation of the pair. South of that interchange, the freeway crosses into Eaton County and over the Grand River. The trunkline passes near residential subdivisions, and next to the interchange for BL I-69/M-43 (Saginaw Highway), there is a large retail development. Farther south, I-496 (Olds Freeway) branches off to run into downtown Lansing before the split between I-96 and I-69. I-69 turns southward while I-96 turns southeasterly, dropping back to four lanes in total. After the Lansing Road interchange, the freeway crosses the Grand River one last time and runs due east to bypass Lansing.

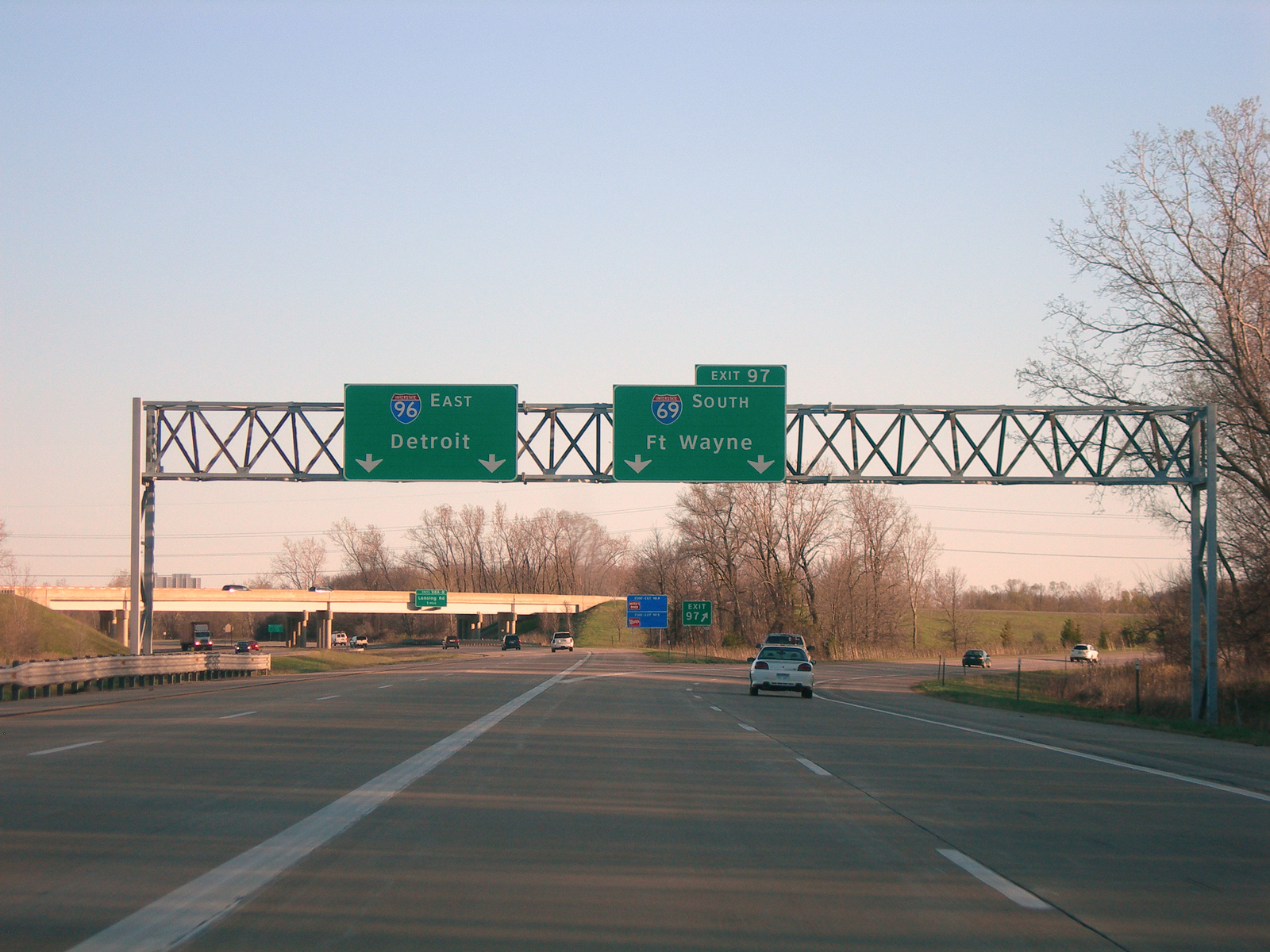
Southern split between I-96 and I-69 southwest of Lansing

I-96 crosses into Ingham County and continues along the southern edges of the Lansing metro area. It passes through areas with residential subdivisions and commercial developments, coming to a pair of interchanges including one for the eastern end of BL I-96 (Cedar Street). Near the crossing of the Red Cedar River, I-96 goes through the interchange for I-496/US 127. East of that interchange, the freeway begins to exit the metro area as the landscape transitions back to farm fields. I-96 continues eastward, bypassing Williamston and Webberville to the south. Near the latter, the freeway turns more southeasterly and crosses into Livingston County. In Livingston County, I-96 passes to the south of Fowlerville and then enters the far northwestern edge of Metro Detroit, passing south of Howell. From this point, the freeway expands to six lanes and runs parallel to Grand River Avenue on the southern side of town.

=== Metro Detroit ===
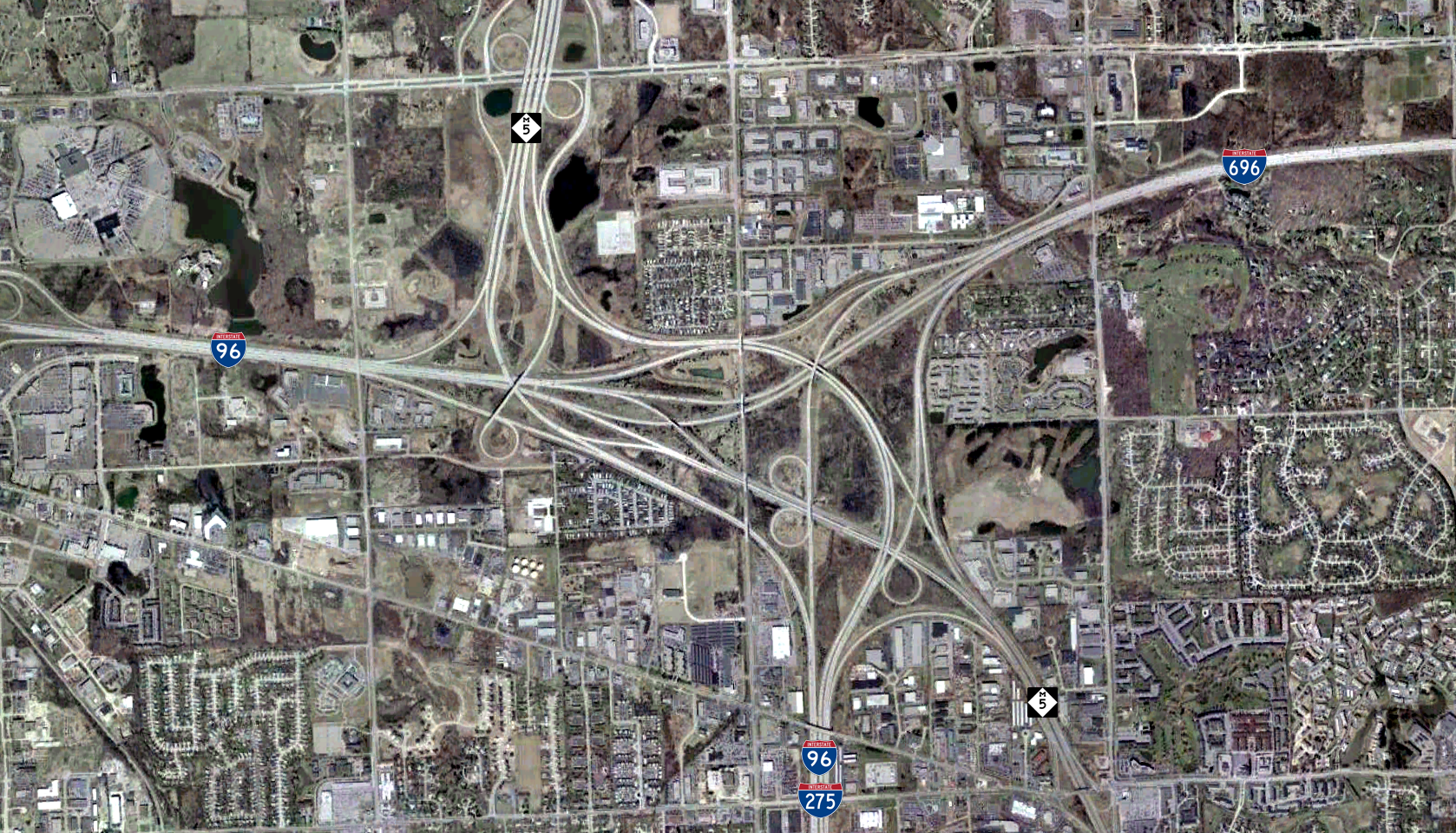
Satellite image of the interchange with M-5, I-275 and I-696 in Novi and Farmington Hills

Near the Livingston County Spencer J. Hardy Airport on the western edge of Howell, I-96 meets M-59, which runs to Pontiac and carries the Howell business loop easterly to Grand River Avenue. The business loop reconnects near Lake Chemung on the east side of town, and I-96 turns further to the southeast. On the northeast side of Brighton, I-96 crosses over Grand River Avenue and the landscape transitions to include residential subdivisions. I-96 proceeds to cross US 23.

I-96 passes through an area with several lakes as it crosses into Oakland County. This area includes the Island Lake State Recreation Area to the south and the Kensington Metropark to the north of the freeway in an area where it crosses the Huron River. The Interstate runs through Wixom into Novi, where it passes to the south of the Twelve Oaks Mall. Southeast of the mall, I-96 enters a complex interchange on the border between Novi and Farmington Hills that connects it to M-5 (Haggerty Connector), I-275 and I-696 (Reuther Freeway). The trunkline drops a lane in each direction as it enters the interchange and turns southward. The freeway then merges into I-275 and increases to four lanes in each direction running south in Farmington Hills.

According to the Federal Highway Administration, I-275 ends at the junction with I-96 and M-14 along the boundary between Livonia and Plymouth Township and not at the interchange in Novi and Farmington Hills. (Note: FHWA's Route Log and Finder List documents the length of I-275 as 29.97 miles (48.23 km), which corresponds to the length from I-75 to the southern I-96 junction. It also omits any mention of an overlap with I-96 from its notes.) MDOT considers I-275 to extend northward concurrently with I-96 to the Novi and Farmington Hills, and maps from other providers follow MDOT's lead and label the freeway north of M-14 as I-96/I-275.

I-96/I-275 runs southward for about two miles (3.2 km) before crossing into Wayne County at the interchange with 8 Mile Road near the Meadowbrook Country Club. The freeway curves to the east around Schoolcraft College; then, south of 5 Mile Road, I-96 meets the interchange with M-14 and I-275 where it turns to the east along the Jeffries Freeway. To the north and south sides of I-96 are a pair of service drives named Schoolcraft Road which follow the 4 Mile location on the Mile Road System for Detroit. To the north of the Jeffries are residential neighborhoods, and to the south are commercial or industrial areas. At Inkster Road, the freeway crosses into Redford Township where it intersects US 24 (Telegraph Road) near Eliza Howell Park. East of the park, I-96 enters Detroit.

Past the Outer Drive interchange, I-96 splits into a local-express lanes configuration. There are two carriageways in each direction, and the central ones have three lanes that bypass almost all of the exits while the outer ones have two lanes that have access to each exit. The Jeffries turns southeasterly and separates from Schoolcraft Road shifting one-half mile (0.80 km) to the south. The interchange with M-39 (Southfield Freeway) features slip ramps so that traffic can pass between the local and express lanes. Further east, I-96 turns northeasterly to cross M-5 (Grand River Avenue). I-96 curves over to the interchange with M-8 (Davison Avenue) and the local-express configuration ends as the freeway turns back to the south to cross over Grand River Avenue.

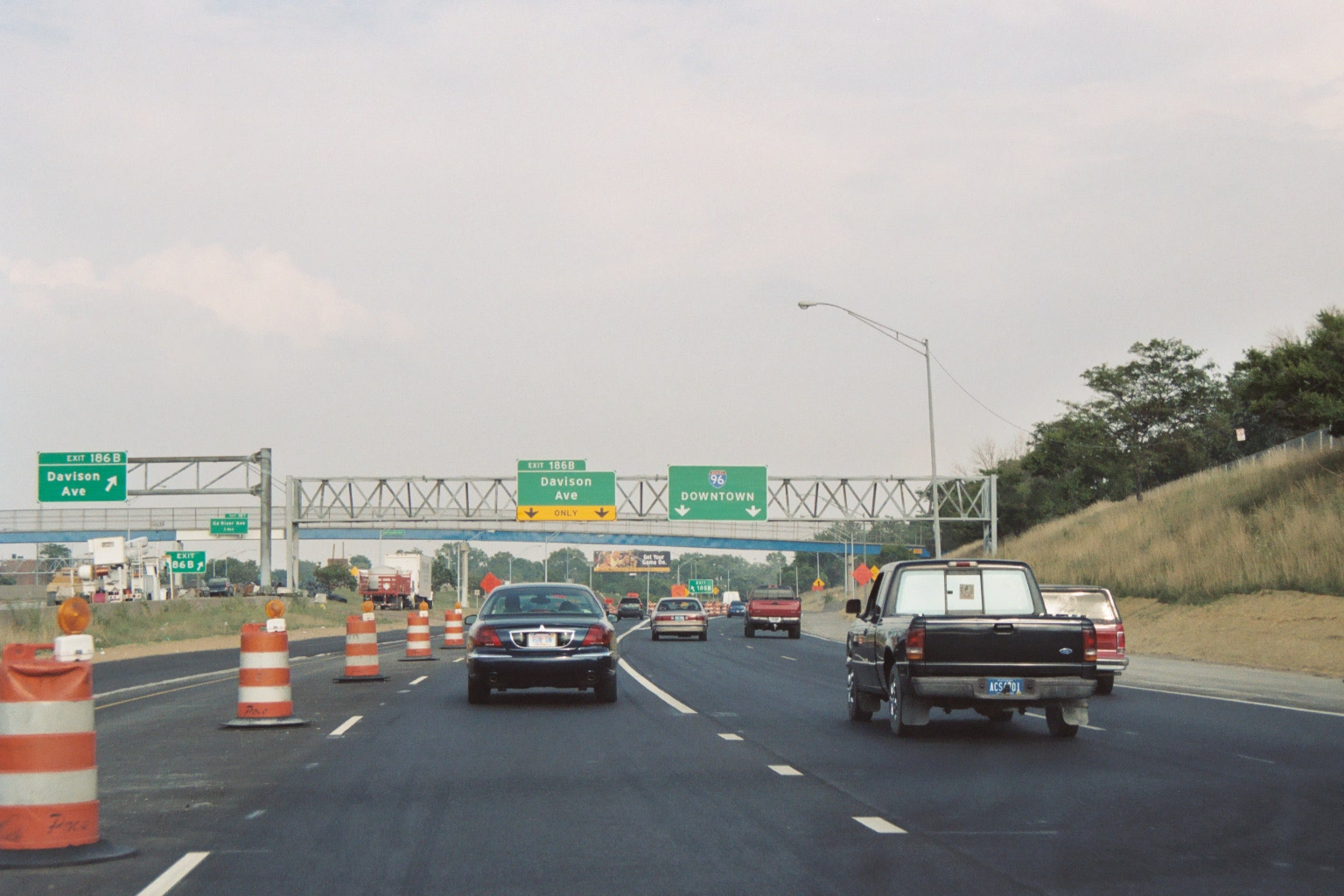
I-96 east at Davison Avenue, the east end of the local–express split

From the crossing south of Davison, I-96 runs parallel to Grand River Avenue southeasterly with eight lanes total. The two run together as far as the interchange with I-94 (Edsel Ford Freeway) near Bishop Park. I-96 turns more south-southeasterly there through residential neighborhoods on Detroit's southeastern side. I-96 terminates at an interchange that connects it to I-75 (Fisher Freeway) and to the Ambassador Bridge.

== History ==
Interstate 96 was mostly constructed in sections that opened from 1957 to 1962, but it was not completed in the Detroit area until 1977. Even before the National Interstate and Defense Highways Act was signed in 1956, the route was being planned as a replacement of the old US 16, which was decommissioned in the state in 1962.

=== Beginnings ===
The Muskegon–Grand Rapids–Lansing–Detroit corridor was initially named the Grand River Road, an Indian trail that was designated as a military highway in 1825. The roadway was included as a branch of "Division 2" of the State Trunkline Highway System when that was created in May 1913. When the system was signposted in 1919, the highway was assigned the M-16 designation. Grand River Avenue was the first paved highway across the state when paving was completed in 1926. The entire highway was designated as part of US 16 later that year.

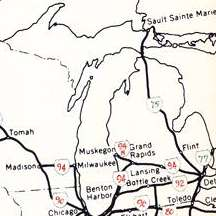
1958 numbering plan for Michigan's Interstates

East of Grand Rapids, the highway was a major artery of national importance, and was added to the proposed "Interregional Highway System" as part of a northern route between Chicago and Detroit by the 1940s. A branch from Grand Rapids to Muskegon was added later that decade, and in 1957 the Chicago–Detroit route was labeled as part of I-94, with I-94N on the spur to Muskegon. Michigan, believing that this would "cause considerable confusion to the public", requested a change in April 1958, which would move I-94 to the shorter Kalamazoo route (which was planned as I-92), make the Muskegon–Detroit route I-96, and assign I-67 to the connection from I-94 to I-96 at Grand Rapids, but this was initially rejected by the American Association of State Highway Officials (AASHO). By mid-1959, Michigan's plan had been approved, with one change: I-96 would take the south leg from I-94 at Benton Harbor to Grand Rapids, and the north leg to Muskegon would be I-196.

Construction of the Brighton–Farmington Expressway piece of the US 16 upgrade began in 1956, and, when a four-mile (6.4 km) piece opened on August 1, 1957, it was the first section of funded Interstate to open in Michigan. The entire 23-mile (37 km) freeway from east of Brighton to a bypass of Farmington was completed in December of that year. By early 1959, when signs for I-96 and I-196 were posted, 59 miles (95 km) of the "Detroit–Muskegon Freeway" had been completed and marked as US 16. With the opening of 51 miles (82 km) from west of Lansing to east of Howell, the entire route, except in the Detroit area, opened for travel on December 12, 1962. US 16 was decommissioned in the state at that time; the portions into Muskegon and Detroit, beyond the ends of the freeway, became separate related highways named Business Spur I-196 (BS I-196) for Muskegon and BS I-96 for Detroit.

In 1963, the Michigan State Highway Department petitioned AASHO to again make the change it had requested back in 1958, moving I-96 over I-196 to end at Muskegon and renumbering I-96 west of Grand Rapids to I-67. The state cited problems with destination signing and numerous complaints from the public about confusion caused by the numbering. At their October 21, 1963, meeting, AASHO approved the relocation of I-96, but rejected I-67, stating that the number should be kept for a more major route in case the system is expanded, and instead assigned I-196 to the not-yet-complete Benton Harbor–Grand Rapids highway. The signage was switched in January 1964. With the scheduled completion of the Lodge Freeway on October 29, 1964, a full freeway route was available from I-96 into downtown Detroit via I-696 and the Lodge, but it would be some time before I-96 was finished into the city.

=== Construction of the Jeffries Freeway ===
The Detroit Expressway and Transit System plan, prepared in 1945 for the city of Detroit, included a Grand River Expressway, which was to parallel Grand River Avenue into downtown and relieve congestion on that artery. A rail line would be built in the median of the freeway west of West Chicago Street, where streetcars would exit onto the existing surface tracks on Grand River Avenue into downtown. The plan called for a future conversion to rapid transit with a grade-separated route to downtown. The Department of Street Railways determined in 1947 that the operation would cost $6 million per year (equivalent to $67.8 million/yr in 2025), and the planned transit line was dropped from the plans. By 1961, the proposed highway was renamed the Jeffries Freeway, after Edward Jeffries, who served as Detroit mayor from 1940 to 1948.

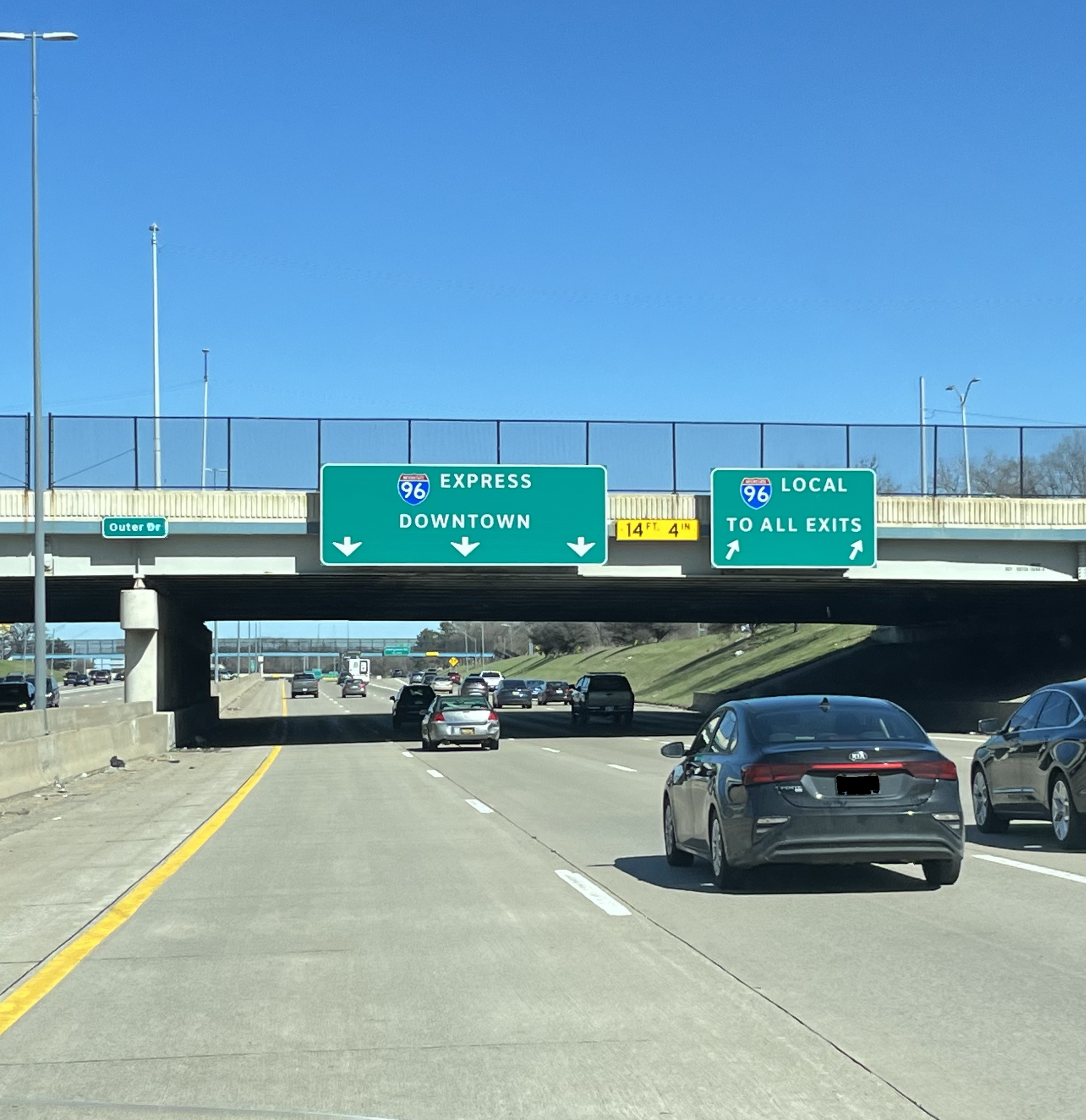
Approaching where the Jeffries Freeway (I-96) splits into Express and Local lanes in Detroit

Originally, the route of I-96 from the east end of the existing freeway in Farmington through Detroit, named the Jeffries Freeway (commonly referred to as simply "the Jeffries"), was to closely parallel Grand River Avenue (formerly US 16). However, by 1963, several freeway revolts were taking place in urban locations throughout the country, including Detroit. Several of Detroit's planned freeways were modified, scaled back, or outright cancelled. To minimize the impact to existing communities and businesses, it was decided that the Jeffries Freeway would no longer utilize the Grand River Avenue corridor. Instead, the new I-96 freeway corridor would partially use right-of-way from the C&O Railroad through the city of Livonia (ultimately being built over Schoolcraft Road), and utilize the planned I-275 freeway bypassing Detroit to the west to connect back to the existing freeway.

The first piece of the Jeffries Freeway connected the Fisher Freeway (I-75) with the Edsel Ford Freeway (I-94) in 1970. It was extended northwest to Livernois Avenue (exit 188A) in July 1971, and then to Grand River Avenue at Schaefer Highway (exit 185) in 1973. In 1976, the freeway was extended west to the Southfield Freeway (exit 183), and the entire I-275 concurrent section was opened. The final piece was completed on November 21, 1977, connecting the Detroit section to I-275. The I-96 designation was assigned along the I-275 freeway south to the Jeffries Freeway, and eastward along the new freeway to the M-39 interchange; the remaining stub of I-96 around Farmington was redesignated as an extension of M-102 (now M-5).

=== Subsequent history ===
Since the completion of I-96 in 1977, several changes to the freeway have taken place. Beginning in 1984, an extension of the US 27 freeway (later to become I-69) bypassing Lansing opened; US 27 was then cosigned with I-96 along the western side of Lansing. Three years later, the I-69 designation was applied to this new bypass, resulting in a triple concurrency (I-96/I-69/US 27) that existed until 2002, when US 27 was decommissioned in Michigan.

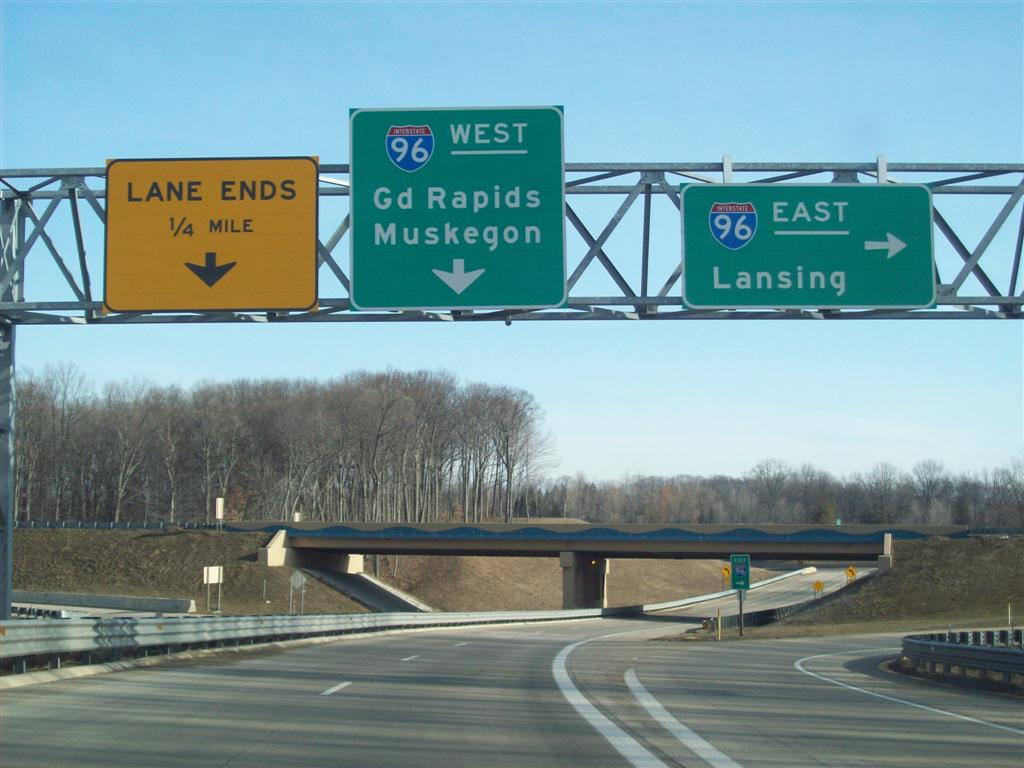
Exit and entry ramps from the 36th Street interchange

From 2003 to 2005, the Beck Road interchange (exit 160) in Novi was reconstructed as a single point urban interchange (SPUI), the first in the metropolitan Detroit area and the first on I-96. An interchange between 36th Street and I-96 was built starting in 2005 and was completed in 2006. The project aimed to improve access to the Gerald R. Ford International Airport southeast of Grand Rapids. The reconstruction of the Wixom Road interchange near Novi as a SPUI was completed in late fall of 2008. Another interchange at Latson Road in Howell was approved for construction on July 19, 2012. This interchange was designed to bring improved access to the eastern Howell area, which prior to construction of the Latson Road exit was only accessible from westbound I-96. The project was completed on December 2, 2013. Also in 2013, the two interchanges near Nunica serving M-104 and B-31 were reconstructed, with two ramps removed from the former and two added to the latter; a new partial interchange was also built in preparation of M-231, which opened on October 30, 2015.

On April 5, 2014, MDOT closed I-96 between Newburgh Road and US 24 (Telegraph Road). The project was estimated to cost $148 million (equivalent to $198 million in 2025), and would rebuild the seven miles (11 km) of roadway, replace two bridges, and repair 32 other bridges. The department also planned to install new drainage and replace the signs along I-96. The project was expected to be completed in October 2014. Instead, it was finished ahead of schedule, and that segment of I-96 was re-opened on September 21, 2014.

Also in 2015, work began on bypassing the 1960s interchange with US 23 near Brighton. A new set of through lanes was built on I-96 between the previous eastbound and westbound lanes with three new bridges over northbound and southbound US 23, and Old US 23. The existing lanes of I-96 were changed to be collector-distributor lanes for ramp traffic. This project was completed in November 2016.

MDOT started work to add a flex route on I-96 between Kent Lake Road and the I-275/I-696/M-5 interchange in Novi on March 21, 2022. Under this plan, the shoulders of the highway will be available as extra lanes during peak traffic periods, and indicated with overhead light systems. In addition, ramp meters will be installed at ramps onto the freeway. The construction was completed in October 2024, but the flex route was not operational until March 19, 2025.

=== Gateway Project ===
Beginning on February 25, 2008, MDOT and the Detroit International Bridge Company initiated the Ambassador Gateway Project at the eastern end of I-96. The adjacent section of I-75 closed completely to traffic in both directions to start the complete reconstruction of the road to better connect I-75 and I-96 to the Ambassador Bridge, and the plans included the reconstruction of a mile (1.6 km) of I-96. That segment of I-96 closed on July 14, 2008, and it was scheduled to reopen a month early the following September. The overall project to realign ramps and connect the bridge to the freeways was mired in lawsuits between MDOT and the private company that owns the bridge. The company's owner was jailed for contempt of court during court proceedings in early 2012. MDOT was later ordered to assume responsibility for construction, and the department completed the project on September 21, 2012.

=== Incidents ===
On January 12, 2005, a large multiple-vehicle collision consisting of over 200 motor vehicles occurred on both directions of I-96 near Williamston in Ingham County. Two people were killed in the incident. It was one of the largest collisions in US history and was blamed on heavy fog.

In October 2012, reports of a sniper shooting cars along I-96 in four counties led to a federal investigation and a multi-jurisdictional task force of 100 law enforcement officials. As of October 30, 2012, 25 shootings had been linked to one suspect. The Federal Bureau of Investigation, the Bureau of Alcohol, Tobacco, Firearms and Explosives, and Crime Stoppers offered a $102,000 (equivalent to $141,000 in 2025) reward for information leading to the arrest of the perpetrator. The suspect, Raulie Casteel of Wixom, was arrested on November 5, 2012, and ordered to stand trial in 2013 in Oakland County for 60 charges in one case, with a second trial on terrorism and murder charges to be brought by the Michigan Attorney General. On October 30, 2013, the suspect pleaded no contest, but mentally ill, in the Oakland County case, and he was sentenced to serve anywhere from six years and eight months to 10 years in prison on multiple assault charges (as well as two concurrent years on weapons charges) for that case on February 4, 2014. The trial for the Livingston County case began on January 14, 2014, and after being convicted on the terrorism charge, Casteel was sentenced to 16 to 40 years in state prison.

== Exit list ==
| County | Location | mi | km | Exit | Destinations | Notes |
|---|---|---|---|---|---|---|
| Muskegon | Norton Shores | 0.000 | 0.000 | 1 | US 31 / LMCT south / Airline Road – Grand Haven, Ludington, Muskegon Bus. US 31 north / LMCT north – Downtown Muskegon | Signed as exits 1A (south, Grand Haven, Airline Road) and 1B (north, Ludington, Muskegon) for US 31; no eastbound exit to Airline Road; freeway continues west as Bus. US 31; exit 110 on US 31 |
| Muskegon | Fruitport Township | 0.293 | 0.472 | 1C | Hile Road | Eastbound exit and entrance only; westbound access is at exit 1A; provides access from northbound US 31 to eastbound I-96 |
| Muskegon | Fruitport Township | 3.517 | 5.660 | 4 | Airline Road – Fruitport | |
| Muskegon | Fruitport Township | 5.100 | 8.208 | 5 | Fruitport Road – Fruitport | Westbound exit and eastbound entrance; trucks and commercial vehicles must use exit 4 instead |
| Ottawa | Crockery Township | 8.877– 9.292 | 14.286– 14.954 | 9 | M-104 west – Grand Haven, Spring Lake M-231 south (120th Avenue) | Formerly directional access (eastbound to eastbound and westbound to westbound only), with eastbound exit signed as B-31, Nunica; new eastbound exit and westbound entrance built 2013, connecting to M-231; eastern terminus of M-104 and northern terminus of M-231 |
| Ottawa | Crockery Township | 10.081 | 16.224 | 10 | B-31 – Nunica | Converted to full interchange in late 2013; eastbound exit and westbound entrance were previously at exit 9 |
| Ottawa | Coopersville | 15.991 | 25.735 | 16 | B-35 – Coopersville, Eastmanville | Westbound entrance via Randall Avenue |
| Ottawa | Coopersville | 18.584 | 29.908 | 19 | Lamont, Coopersville | Connects to 48th Avenue |
| Ottawa | Wright Township | 22.805 | 36.701 | 23 | Marne | Connects to 16th Avenue via Jackson Street (eastbound) and Franklin Street (westbound) |
| Ottawa | Tallmadge Township | 23.939 | 38.526 | 24 | M-11 – Walker, Grandville | Eastbound exit and westbound entrance; western terminus of M-11 |
| Ottawa | Tallmadge Township | 24.215 | 38.970 | 25 | 8th Avenue, 4 Mile Road | Westbound exit and eastbound entrance; westbound access to M-11 |
| Kent | Walker | 26.430 | 42.535 | 26 | Fruit Ridge Avenue | |
| Kent | Walker | 28.367 | 45.652 | 28 | Walker Avenue | |
| Kent | Walker | 30.295 | 48.755 | 30 | M-37 north (Alpine Avenue) – Newaygo | Western end of M-37 concurrency; signed as exits 30A (south) and 30B (north) westbound |
| Kent | Walker | 30.711– 31.440 | 49.425– 50.598 | 31 | US 131 (I-296 south) – Grand Rapids, Kalamazoo, Big Rapids, Cadillac | Signed as exits 31A (south) and 31B (north); northern terminus of unsigned I-296; exit 89 on US 131 |
| Kent | Grand Rapids | 33.063 | 53.210 | 33 | Conn. M-44 east (Plainfield Avenue) | Western terminus of Conn. M-44 |
| Kent | Grand Rapids | 36.533 | 58.794 | 36 | Leonard Street | |
| Kent | Grand Rapids | 37.073 | 59.663 | 37 | I-196 west (Gerald R. Ford Freeway) – Downtown Grand Rapids, Holland | Westbound exit and eastbound entrance; eastern terminus of I-196 |
| Kent | Grand Rapids | 37.801 | 60.835 | 38 | M-37 south (East Beltline Avenue) to M-21 M-44 east (East Beltline Avenue) | Eastern end of M-37 concurrency; M-21 signed westbound only; western terminus of M-44 |
| Kent | Grand Rapids Township | 38.687– 38.788 | 62.261– 62.423 | 39 | M-21 – Lowell, Flint | No westbound exit or eastbound entrance from westbound M-21; missing connections at exit 38 |
| Kent | Grand Rapids Township | 40.014 | 64.396 | 40 | Cascade Road – Cascade | Former US 16 |
| Kent | Cascade Township | 42.986 | 69.179 | 43 | M-11 west (28th Street) – Cascade | Signed as exits 43A (west) and 43B (east); eastern terminus of M-11 |
| Kent | Cascade Township | 44.165– 44.174 | 71.077– 71.091 | 44 | 36th Street | Signed as access to Gerald R. Ford International Airport |
| Kent | Cascade Township | 45.776– 46.015 | 73.669– 74.054 | 46 | M-6 west – Holland | Eastern terminus of M-6 |
| Kent | Lowell Township | 52.303 | 84.174 | 52 | M-50 east – Charlotte, Lowell | Western terminus of M-50 |
| Ionia | Boston Township | 58.912 | 94.810 | 59 | Saranac, Clarksville | Saranac signed eastbound only; connects to Nash Highway |
| Ionia | Berlin Township | 64.429 | 103.688 | 64 | Saranac, Lake Odessa | Saranac signed westbound only; connects to Jordan Lake Road |
| Ionia | Berlin Township | 67.427 | 108.513 | 67 | M-66 – Ionia, Battle Creek | |
| Ionia | Orange Township | 73.291 | 117.950 | 73 | Portland Road, Grand River Avenue | |
| Ionia | Portland | 76.071 | 122.424 | 76 | Kent Street | |
| Ionia | Portland | 77.493 | 124.713 | 77 | Grand River Avenue – Portland | Former BS I-96; Portland signed westbound only |
| Clinton | Eagle | 83.617 | 134.569 | 84 | Westphalia, Eagle | Connects to Grange Road; westbound connection via Clark Road |
| Clinton | Eagle Township | 86.273 | 138.843 | 86 | M-100 south (Wright Road) – Grand Ledge | Northern terminus of M-100 |
| Clinton | Watertown Township | 89.670 | 144.310 | 89 | I-69 east – Flint | Eastbound exit and westbound entrance; exit 81 on I-69 |
| Clinton | Watertown Township | 90.040 | 144.905 | 90 | BL I-96 east (Grand River Avenue) | Western terminus of BL I-96; signed westbound as only Grand River Avenue |
| Clinton | Watertown Township | 90.466 | 145.591 | 91 | I-69 east – Flint | Westbound exit and eastbound entrance; western end of I-69 concurrency |
| Eaton | Delta Township | 93.118 | 149.859 | 93 | M-43 / BL I-69 east (Saginaw Highway) – Grand Ledge | Signed as exits 93A (west) and 93B (east) |
| Eaton | Delta Township | 94.579– 94.815 | 152.210– 152.590 | 95 | I-496 east – Downtown Lansing | Western terminus of I-496 |
| Eaton | Delta Township | 96.667– 96.687 | 155.570– 155.603 | 97 | I-69 south – Fort Wayne | Eastern end of I-69 concurrency; exit 72 on I-69 |
| Eaton | Windsor Township | 97.847– 97.858 | 157.469– 157.487 | 98 | Lansing Road | Signed as exits 98A (south) and 98B (north); former US 27 |
| Ingham | Lansing | 101.425 | 163.228 | 101 | M-99 (M L King Boulevard) – Eaton Rapids | |
| Ingham | Lansing | 104.395– 104.404 | 168.007– 168.022 | 104 | BL I-96 west (Cedar Street) – Holt | Indirect access to Cedar Street, requires exiting onto a trumpet interchange with Edgewood Boulevard; eastern terminus of BL I-96; signed eastbound as only Cedar Street |
| Ingham | Delhi Township | 106.490– 106.518 | 171.379– 171.424 | 106 | I-496 west / US 127 – Jackson, East Lansing, Downtown Lansing | Signed as exits 106A (south) and 106B (north); eastern terminus of I-496; exit 73 on US 127 |
| Ingham | Alaiedon Township | 109.732 | 176.597 | 110 | Okemos, Mason | Connects to Okemos Road |
| Ingham | Wheatfield Township | 117.504 | 189.104 | 117 | Dansville, Williamston | Signed as exits 117A (Dansville) and 117B (Williamston) eastbound; connects to Williamston Road |
| Ingham | Webberville | 121.914 | 196.202 | 122 | M-43 west / M-52 – Webberville, Stockbridge | Eastern terminus of M-43 |
| Livingston | Fowlerville | 128.493 | 206.789 | 129 | Fowlerville | Connects to Grand Avenue |
| Livingston | Howell Township | 133.305 | 214.534 | 133 | M-59 east / BL I-96 east (Highland Road) – Howell, Pontiac | Western terminus of BL I-96 and M-59; signage eastbound omits Highland Road; signage westbound omits BL I-96, Howell, and Pontiac |
| Livingston | Howell | 136.799 | 220.157 | 137 | D-19 south – Howell, Pinckney | Northern terminus of D-19 |
| Livingston | Genoa Township | 140.113 | 225.490 | 140 | Latson Road | Opened December 2, 2013 |
| Livingston | Genoa Township | 141.218 | 227.268 | 141 | BL I-96 west – Howell | Westbound exit and eastbound entrance from eastbound Grand River only; eastern terminus of BL I-96 |
| Livingston | Brighton | 145.130 | 233.564 | 145 | Grand River Avenue – Brighton | Signage westbound omits Brighton |
| Livingston | Brighton Township | 146.768 | 236.200 | 147 | Spencer Road – Brighton | Signage eastbound omits Brighton; connected to exit 148 westbound |
| Livingston | Brighton Township | 147.578– 147.755 | 237.504– 237.789 | 148 | US 23 – Ann Arbor, Flint | Signed as exits 148A (south) and 148B (north); exit 60 on US 23 |
| Livingston | Brighton Township | 149.458 | 240.529 | 150 | Pleasant Valley Road | Westbound exit and eastbound entrance |
| Livingston | Brighton Township | 151.056 | 243.101 | 151 | Kensington Road | |
| Oakland | Lyon Township | 152.887 | 246.048 | 153 | Kent Lake Road – South Lyon | Only South Lyon signed eastbound |
| Oakland | Lyon Township | 154.900 | 249.287 | 155 | New Hudson, Milford | Connects to Milford Road; signed as exits 155A (New Hudson) and 155B (Milford) westbound |
| Oakland | Wixom | 159.236 | 256.266 | 159 | Wixom Road | |
| Oakland | Novi | 160.299– 160.313 | 257.976– 257.999 | 160 | Beck Road – Novi | |
| Oakland | Novi | 162.413 | 261.378 | 162 | Walled Lake, Novi, Northville | Northville signed eastbound only; Walled Lake signed westbound only; connects to Novi Road |
| Oakland | Novi | 163.381 | 262.936 | 163 | I-696 east (Reuther Freeway) – Port Huron M-5 east / Grand River Avenue I-275 south – Toledo | Eastbound exit and westbound entrance; western terminus of I-696; exit 1 on I-696 |
| Oakland | Novi | 163.818 | 263.640 | 164 | M-5 north / 12 Mile Road | Eastbound exit and westbound entrance |
| Oakland | Farmington Hills | 164.964 | 265.484 | 165 | I-696 east (Reuther Freeway) – Port Huron; M-5 / Grand River Avenue | Northern end of I-275 concurrency; westbound exit and eastbound entrance; westbound access to 12 Mile Road; exit 1 on I-696 |
| Oakland–Wayne county line | Farmington Hills–Livonia city line | 167.383 | 269.377 | 167 | 8 Mile Road – Northville | |
| Wayne | Livonia | 168.440 | 271.078 | 169 | 7 Mile Road | Signed as exits 169A (west) and 169B (east) westbound |
| Wayne | Livonia | 169.438 | 272.684 | 170 | 6 Mile Road | |
| Wayne | Plymouth Township | 170.503– 171.610 | 274.398– 276.180 | | I-275 south – Toledo M-14 west – Ann Arbor | Southern end of I-275 concurrency; exit 29 on I-275 northbound; eastern terminus of M-14 |
| Wayne | Livonia | 172.365 | 277.395 | 173 | Newburgh Road, Levan Road | Signed as exits 173A (Newburgh Road) and 173B (Levan Road) westbound |
| Wayne | Livonia | 174.366 | 280.615 | 174 | Farmington Road | |
| Wayne | Livonia | 175.369 | 282.229 | 175 | Merriman Road | |
| Wayne | Livonia | 176.374 | 283.846 | 176 | Middle Belt Road | |
| Wayne | Redford Township | 177.372 | 285.453 | 177 | Inkster Road | |
| Wayne | Redford Township | 178.341 | 287.012 | 178 | Beech-Daly Road | |
| Wayne | Redford Township | 179.303– 179.345 | 288.560– 288.628 | 179 | US 24 (Telegraph Road) | |
| Wayne | Detroit | 180.328– 180.355 | 290.210– 290.253 | 180 | Outer Drive | |
| Wayne | Detroit | 180.465 | 290.430 | Western end of express lanes | | |
| Wayne | Detroit | 181.488 | 292.077 | 182 | Evergreen Road | |
| Wayne | Detroit | 182.527– 182.559 | 293.749– 293.800 | 183 | M-39 (Southfield Freeway) | Additional westbound exit and eastbound entrance on the express lanes; exit 11A on M-39 |
| Wayne | Detroit | 183.505– 183.515 | 295.323– 295.339 | 184 | Greenfield Road | |
| Wayne | Detroit | 184.575– 184.700 | 297.045– 297.246 | 185 | Schaefer Highway, Grand River Avenue (M-5) | Former eastern terminus of M-5 |
| Wayne | Detroit | 185.579– 185.586 | 298.660– 298.672 | 186A | Wyoming Avenue | |
| Wayne | Detroit | 185.935– 186.141 | 299.233– 299.565 | 186B | Davison Avenue (M-8) | Western terminus of M-8; no exits to westbound Davison Avenue |
| Wayne | Detroit | 186.362 | 299.921 | Eastern end of express lanes | | |
| Wayne | Detroit | 186.996 | 300.941 | 187 | Grand River Avenue (M-5) | Eastbound exit and westbound entrance |
| Wayne | Detroit | 187.452– 187.880 | 301.675– 302.364 | 188 | Livernois Avenue, West Chicago Avenue, Joy Road | Signed as exits 188A (Livernois Avenue, West Chicago Avenue) and 188B (Joy Road) westbound; West Chicago Avenue signed westbound only |
| Wayne | Detroit | 189.070– 189.107 | 304.279– 304.338 | 189 | Tireman Avenue, West Grand Boulevard | |
| Wayne | Detroit | 189.791– 189.818 | 305.439– 305.482 | 190A | I-94 (Edsel Ford Freeway) – Port Huron, Chicago | Exit 213B on I-94 |
| Wayne | Detroit | 190.093 | 305.925 | 190B | Warren Avenue | |
| Wayne | Detroit | 190.857– 191.233 | 307.155– 307.760 | 191 | US 12 (Michigan Avenue); M L King Jr. Boulevard | |
| Wayne | Detroit | 190.933 | 307.277 | — | I-75 north (Fisher Freeway) – Flint; M-10 (Lodge Freeway) – Civic Center | Eastbound exit and westbound entrance; exit 48 on I-75 |
| Wayne | Detroit | 191.466 | 308.135 | 192A | Vernor Highway | Eastbound exit and westbound entrance |
| Wayne | Detroit | 191.966 | 308.939 | 192B | (Canada) Ambassador Bridge | Eastbound exit and westbound entrance |
| Wayne | Detroit | 192.032 | 309.046 | — | I-75 south (Fisher Freeway) – Toledo | Eastbound exit and westbound entrance; exit 48 on I-75 |
1.000 mi = 1.609 km; 1.000 km = 0.621 mi: Concurrency terminus; Incomplete access

== Related trunklines ==
=== Auxiliary Interstates ===
I-96 has four related, auxiliary Interstate highways that connect the main freeway to downtowns and other cities. I-196 is a relatively long freeway spur, beginning at I-96 east of downtown Grand Rapids and heading west through downtown to Holland, and then south to I-94 near Benton Harbor. The unsigned I-296 connects I-96 north of downtown Grand Rapids with I-196 in downtown, and it is signed as US 131. I-496 is a loop through downtown Lansing, which I-96 bypasses to the south, and I-696 is a northern bypass of Detroit, connecting I-96 in Novi with I-75 in Royal Oak and I-94 in St. Clair Shores.

=== Business routes ===
There have been six business routes of I-96 in Michigan. There are two business loops designated Business Loop I-96 (BL I-96): one through Lansing and one through Howell. Both follow the old route of US 16, with appropriate connections to I-96. There are three former business spurs that were designated Business Spur I-96 (BS I-96). One connected to the carferry docks in Muskegon, running concurrently with part of Business US 31 (Bus. US 31) along former US 16, but it has been eliminated. The second spur ran into downtown Portland until it was decommissioned in 2007. Two routes in the Detroit area—a loop through Farmington and a spur into Detroit—both using Grand River Avenue, and meeting at the temporary end of I-96 near Purdue Avenue, were eliminated when I-96 was moved to the completed Jeffries Freeway in 1977. The Farmington business route is still state-maintained as an unsigned highway, while the Detroit business route remained unsigned until it was decommissioned in 2016 and replaced by an extension of M-5.
