= Muskegon, Grand Rapids and Indiana Railroad =

Map

The Muskegon, Grand Rapids and Indiana Railroad(MGR&I) is a defunct railroad which operated in Western Michigan. Operating between Grand Rapids and Muskegon, it was the second rail line built into Muskegon. MGR&I was a branch line of the Grand Rapids and Indiana Railroad. The railbed now serves as the Musketawa Trail.
