= Marne, Michigan =

- Unincorporated community
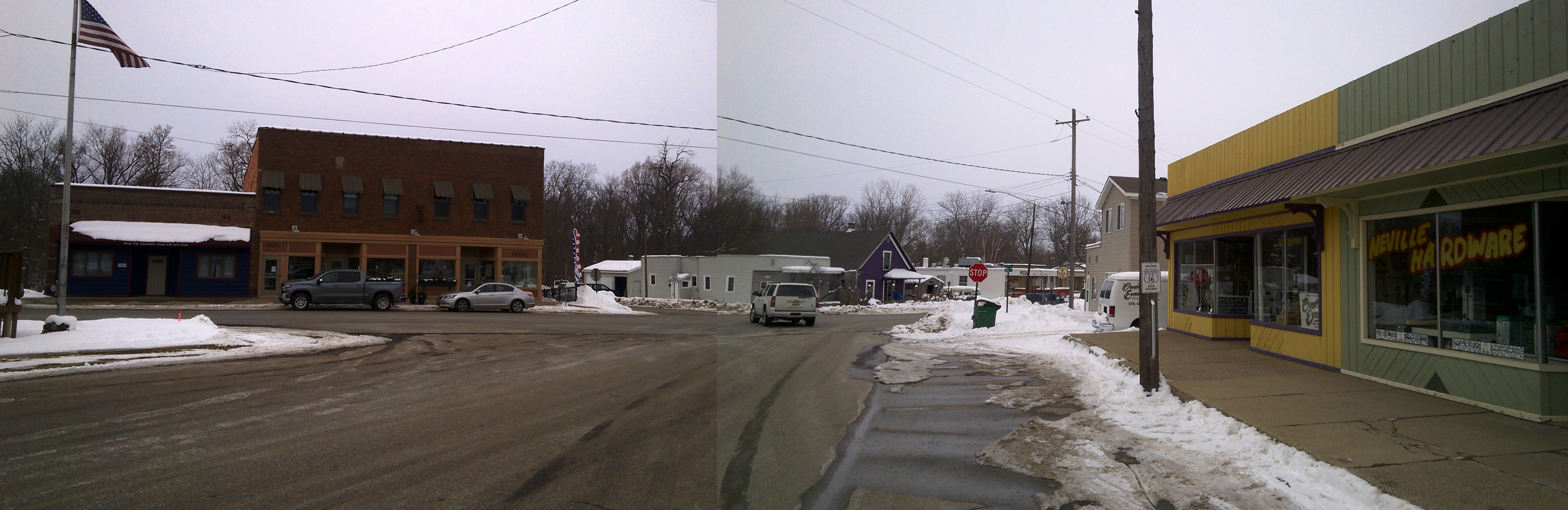

- Location within the state of Michigan
- Coordinates: 43°02′10″N 85°49′40″W
- Country: United States
- State: Michigan
- County: Ottawa
- Township: Wright
- Elevation: 673 ft (205 m)
- Time zone: UTC-5 (Eastern (EST))
  - Summer (DST): UTC-4 (EDT)
- Area code: 616
- GNIS feature ID: 631597

Marne (/mɑːrn/) is an unincorporated community in Wright Township of Ottawa County in the U.S. state of Michigan.

== Geography ==
Marne is 2.19 sq mi (5.7 km^{2}) large and it is 12 mi (19 km) northwest of downtown Grand Rapids.

The Marne ZIP code 49435 serves areas in southern and eastern Wright Township, as well as areas of central Tallmadge Township to the south and small areas of Alpine Township to the east in Kent County.

Marne is located at 43°02′10″N 85°49′40″W off exit 23 on Interstate 96, 12 miles northwest of Grand Rapids.

Township offices are located in the community.

== History ==
Marne was originally called Berlin due to the many German settlers in the area. It received a post office in 1852 and was platted in 1857. Due to anti-German sentiments during World War I, the name was changed in 1919 to Marne, to honor those soldiers who fought in the Second Battle of the Marne. However, the name Berlin continues to manifest in many ways, including Berlin Baptist Church, the Berlin Fairgrounds, Berlin Fair Drive and the Berlin Raceway, where Carson Hocevar raced.

Marne (at the time Berlin) also served as a stop on the historic Grand Rapids, Grand Haven & Muskegon interurban railroad. The depot still remains to this day, although it serves as a restaurant now.

Ed Cole, an automotive executive for General Motors, was born in Marne, where his father was a dairy farmer.

Marne serves as a trailhead for the Musketawa Trail.

== Demographics ==
According to the 2011 US Census Bureau, the total population was 3,177. The median age was 42.8 and the percentage of high school graduates and higher was 91%. The median house value in 2011 was $177,300 while the median household income was $64,245. 6.8% of the population was below the poverty line in 2011.

== Education ==
The Kenowa Hills Public Schools serves Marne. Marne Elementary School was formerly located in Marne.
