= Grand Valley, Michigan =

- Unincorporated community
- Location within the state of Michigan
- Coordinates: 42°58′28″N 85°52′11″W
- Country: United States
- State: Michigan
- County: Ottawa
- Charter township: Tallmadge
- Elevation: 600 ft (180 m)
- Time zone: UTC-5 (Eastern (EST))
  - Summer (DST): UTC-4 (EDT)
- Area code: 616
- GNIS feature ID: 627116

Grand Valley is an unincorporated community in Tallmadge Charter Township in the U.S. state of Michigan. The community is on M-45 just east of the Grand River at 42°58′28″N 85°52′11″W. The valley is about a mile (1.4 km) wide here and somewhat wider just to the south, with steep bluffs on the western and southern side of the river.

The main campus of Grand Valley State University is situated on the west side of the river in Allendale Charter Township.

The Grand Valley Metropolitan Council, (http://www.gvmc.org) is a partnership of local governments dedicated to intergovernmental cooperation and collaboration in the Grand Valley region.
