= Tallmadge Township, Michigan =

- Charter township
- Tallmadge Charter Township
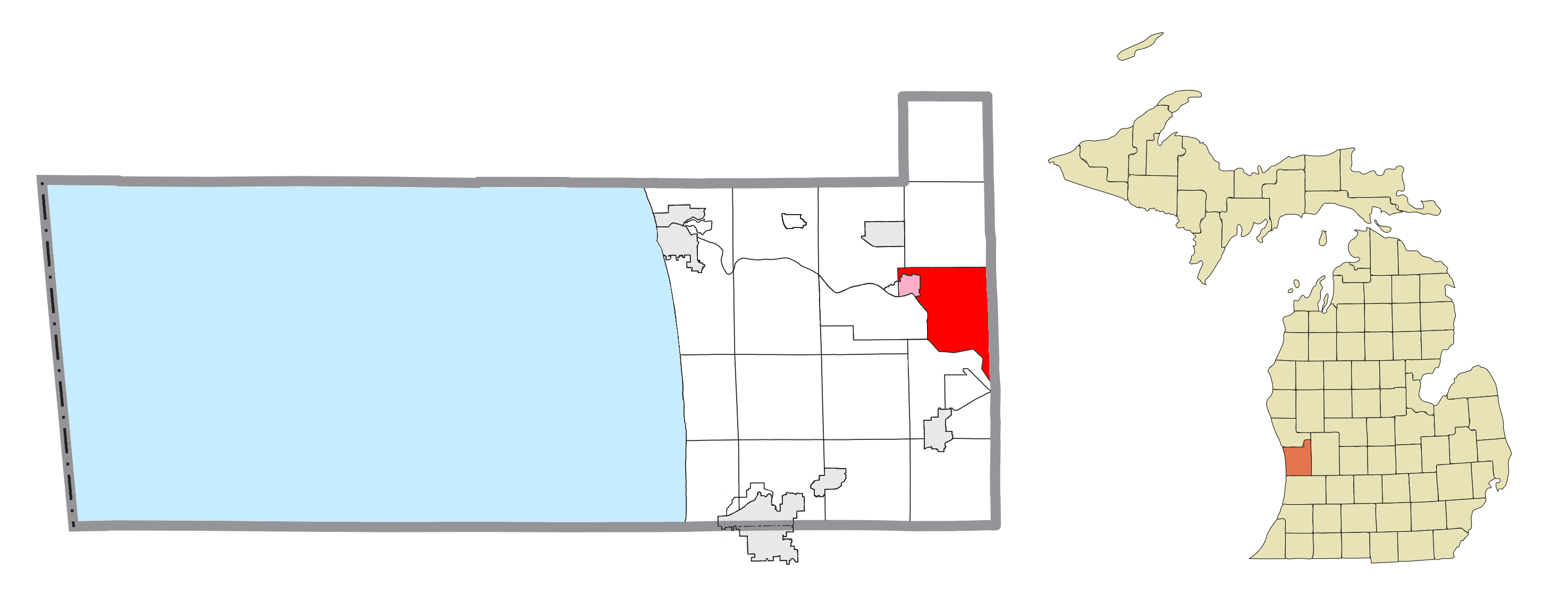
- Location within Ottawa County (red) and an administered portion of the Lamont CDP (pink)

- Location within the state of Michigan Location within the United States
- Coordinates: 42°59′24″N 85°50′18″W
- Country: United States
- State: Michigan
- County: Ottawa

Government
  - Supervisor: Mark Bennett
  - Clerk: Lenore Cook

Area
  - Total: 33.03 sq mi (85.55 km^{2})
  - Land: 32.21 sq mi (83.42 km^{2})
  - Water: 0.82 sq mi (2.12 km^{2})
- Elevation: 679 ft (207 m)

Population (2020)
  - Total: 8,802
  - Density: 273.3/sq mi (105.5/km^{2})
- Time zone: UTC-5 (Eastern (EST))
  - Summer (DST): UTC-4 (EDT)
- ZIP code(s): 49404 (Coopersville); 49428 (Jenison); 49430 (Lamont); 49435 (Marne); 49534 (Grand Rapids)
- Area code: 616
- FIPS code: 26-77980
- GNIS feature ID: 1627150
- Website: Official website

Tallmadge Charter Township is a charter township of Ottawa County in the U.S. state of Michigan. The population was 8,802 at the 2020 census.

== Communities ==
- Finnasey was a rural post office in Tallmadge Township from 1882 until 1883.
- Lamont is a census-designated place on the north side of the Grand River at 43°00′31″N 85°54′22″W. It was founded in 1833 by Harry and Zine Steele, and was known for many years as Steele's Landing. The Steele's Landing post office was established January 9, 1851. In the same year, the Steeles had the village platted as "Middleville", due to being located midway between Grand Rapids and Grand Haven, although the post office remained Steele's Landing. In 1855 Lamont Chubb, of Grand Rapids, offered a road scraper to the village in exchange for the community taking on his name. The post office was duly renamed as Lamont on July 2, 1856. The Lamont ZIP code 49430 provides P.O. Box-only service.
- Grand Valley is an unincorporated community on M-45 just east of the Grand River.
- Tallmadge is an unincorporated community near the center of the township at 42°59′33″N 85°50′03″W.
- The city of Coopersville is to the northwest, and the Coopersville ZIP code 49404 serves areas in the northwest part of Tallmadge Township.
- Marne is a village along the northern boundary with Wright Township. The Marne ZIP code 49435 also serves areas in the central part of Tallmadge Township.
- The city of Walker is to the east, and the Walker/Grand Rapids ZIP code 49544 serves the eastern parts of Tallmadge Township.

== Geography ==
According to the United States Census Bureau, the township has a total area of 33.0 square miles (85 km^{2}), of which 32.4 square miles (84 km^{2}) is land and 0.6 square miles (1.6 km^{2}), or 1.76%, is water.

== Demographics ==
As of the census of 2000, there were 6,881 people, 2,283 households, and 1,869 families residing in the township. The population density was 212.3 inhabitants per square mile (82.0/km^{2}). There were 2,369 housing units at an average density of 73.1 per square mile (28.2/km^{2}). The racial makeup of the township was 97.83% White, 0.31% African American, 0.32% Native American, 0.31% Asian, 0.44% from other races, and 0.80% from two or more races. Hispanic or Latino of any race were 0.92% of the population.

There were 2,283 households, out of which 40.4% had children under the age of 18 living with them, 74.0% were married couples living together, 5.3% had a female householder with no husband present, and 18.1% were non-families. 14.3% of all households were made up of individuals, and 4.4% had someone living alone who was 65 years of age or older. The average household size was 2.97 and the average family size was 3.32.

In the township the population was spread out, with 29.6% under the age of 18, 8.4% from 18 to 24, 28.5% from 25 to 44, 24.3% from 45 to 64, and 9.2% who were 65 years of age or older. The median age was 36 years. For every 100 females, there were 103.8 males. For every 100 females age 18 and over, there were 104.3 males.

The median income for a household in the township was $59,205, and the median income for a family was $65,086. Males had a median income of $45,847 versus $29,434 for females. The per capita income for the township was $23,957. About 3.4% of families and 5.0% of the population were below the poverty line, including 6.2% of those under age 18 and 4.8% of those age 65 or over.
