= Wright Township, Ottawa County, Michigan =

Wright Township, Michigan
- Civil township
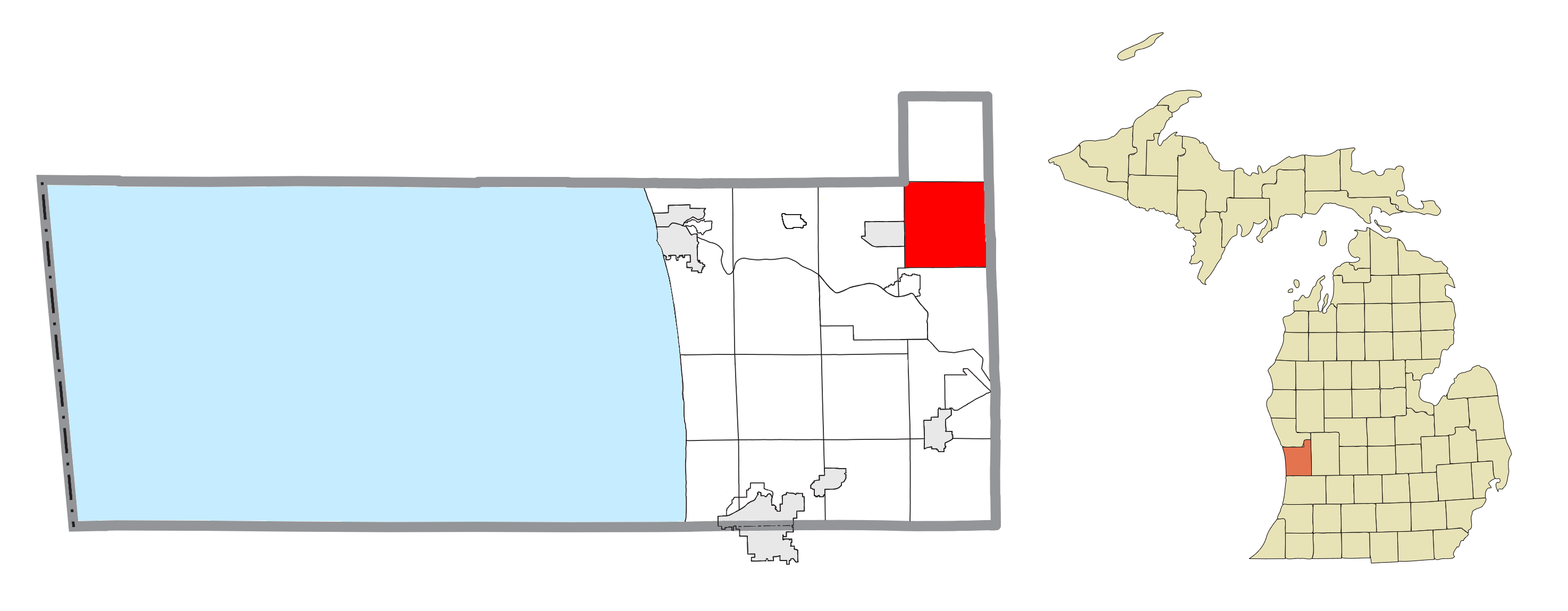
- Location within Ottawa County

- Location within the state of Michigan Location within the United States
- Coordinates: 43°04′32″N 85°50′36″W
- Country: United States
- State: Michigan
- County: Ottawa

Government
  - Supervisor: Rick Schoenborn
  - Clerk: Theresa Frank

Area
  - Total: 36.36 sq mi (94.17 km^{2})
  - Land: 36.10 sq mi (93.50 km^{2})
  - Water: 0.26 sq mi (0.67 km^{2})
- Elevation: 709 ft (216 m)

Population (2020)
  - Total: 3,190
  - Density: 88.4/sq mi (34.1/km^{2})
- Time zone: UTC-5 (Eastern (EST))
  - Summer (DST): UTC-4 (EDT)
- ZIP code(s): 49403 (Conklin); 49404 (Coopersville); 49435 (Marne)
- Area code: 616
- FIPS code: 26-88820
- GNIS feature ID: 1627293
- Website: Official website

Wright Township is a civil township of Ottawa County in the U.S. state of Michigan. The population was 3,190 at the 2020 census.

== Geography ==
According to the United States Census Bureau, the township has a total area of 36.3 square miles (94 km^{2}), of which 36.2 square miles (94 km^{2}) is land and 0.1 square miles (0.26 km^{2}), or 0.39%, is water.

I-96 passes through the southern part of the township with an exit about one mile east of Marne at junction with M-11, another at Marne, and another at the eastern edge of Coopersville.

== Demographics ==
As of the census of 2000, there were 3,286 people, 1,037 households, and 826 families residing in the township. The population density was 90.9 inhabitants per square mile (35.1/km^{2}). There were 1,082 housing units at an average density of 29.9 per square mile (11.5/km^{2}). The racial makeup of the township was 95.53% White, 0.27% African American, 0.61% Native American, 0.15% Asian, 2.59% from other races, and 0.85% from two or more races. Hispanic or Latino of any race were 4.29% of the population.

There were 1,037 households, out of which 38.9% had children under the age of 18 living with them, 69.1% were married couples living together, 6.6% had a female householder with no husband present, and 20.3% were non-families. 17.4% of all households were made up of individuals, and 7.6% had someone living alone who was 65 years of age or older. The average household size was 2.98 and the average family size was 3.38.

In the township the population was spread out, with 29.3% under the age of 18, 8.0% from 18 to 24, 28.5% from 25 to 44, 22.4% from 45 to 64, and 11.8% who were 65 years of age or older. The median age was 36 years. For every 100 females, there were 99.0 males. For every 100 females age 18 and over, there were 101.0 males.

The median income for a household in the township was $51,023, and the median income for a family was $56,389. Males had a median income of $39,360 versus $24,527 for females. The per capita income for the township was $18,183. About 1.3% of families and 4.2% of the population were below the poverty line, including 1.3% of those under age 18 and 5.0% of those age 65 or over.

== Communities ==
- Big Spring was a small settlement at 43°07′08″N 85°50′56″W on the northern boundary of the township between sections 3 and 4. There was a post office there from May 1850 until November 1891.
- Herrington is a tiny unincorporated community at 43°03′37″N 85°49′42″W in the south-central part of the township at the corners where sections 22, 23, 26, and 27 meet. It was a station on the Grand Rapids and Indiana Railway and was given a post office in April 1888.
- Reno is a tiny unincorporated community at 43°04′30″N 85°50′19″W in the central part of the township. It was a station on the Grand Rapids and Indiana Railroad and was given a post office in January 1887.
- Marne, formerly named Berlin, is an unincorporated community along the southern edge of the township and the Marne ZIP code 49435 serves areas in the southern part of Wright Township.
- Wright is a tiny unincorporated community in the northeast corner of the township between sections 1 and 2 at 43°06′39″N 85°48′31″W. The community was named after the Wright Family, which owned land in the area, and for whom the township is named. The community had a post office from 1848 until 1864 and again from 1877 until 1903.
- Conklin is to the north, and the Conklin ZIP code 49403 serves areas in the northern part of Wright Township.
- The city of Coopersville is adjacent to the west, and the Coopersville ZIP code 49404 serves areas in the western and central parts of Wright Township.
