= Polkton Township, Michigan =

- Charter township
- Polkton Charter Township
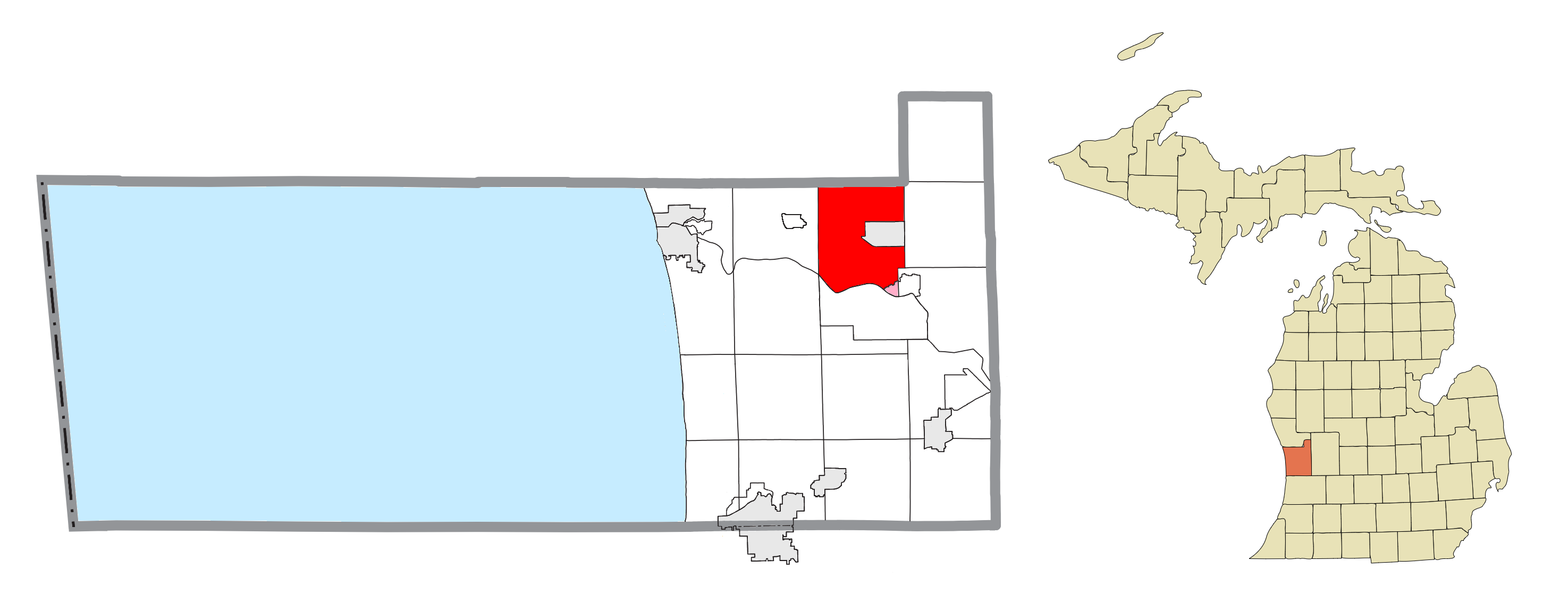
- Location within Ottawa County (red) and an administered portion of the Lamont CDP (pink)

- Location within the state of Michigan Location within the United States
- Coordinates: 43°04′10″N 85°58′26″W
- Country: United States
- State: Michigan
- County: Ottawa
- Established: 1845

Government
  - Supervisor: Ted Costigan
  - Clerk: Connie Langeland

Area
  - Total: 39.72 sq mi (102.87 km^{2})
  - Land: 39.21 sq mi (101.55 km^{2})
  - Water: 0.51 sq mi (1.32 km^{2})
- Elevation: 646 ft (197 m)

Population (2020)
  - Total: 2,565
  - Density: 65.4/sq mi (25.3/km^{2})
- Time zone: UTC-5 (Eastern (EST))
  - Summer (DST): UTC-4 (EDT)
- ZIP code(s): 49404 (Coopersville); 49448 (Nunica)
- Area code: 616
- FIPS code: 26-65320
- GNIS feature ID: 1626923
- Website: https://polktontownship.com/

Polkton Charter Township is a charter township of Ottawa County in the U.S. state of Michigan. The population was 2,565 at the 2020 census. It was organized in 1845.

== Communities ==
- Dennison was the name of a post office in the township starting in 1866.
- Lamont is an unincorporated community and census-designated place n the north side of the Grand River at 43°00′31″N 85°54′22″W, shared with Tallmadge Township.
- The city of Coopersville is located to the east, and the Coopersville ZIP code 49404 serves most of the township. Coopersville was a village within the township until becoming a city in 1967.

== Geography ==
According to the United States Census Bureau, the township has a total area of 39.7 square miles (103 km^{2}), of which 39.2 square miles (102 km^{2}) is land and 0.4 square miles (1.0 km^{2}) (1.06%) is water.

== Demographics ==
As of the census of 2000, there were 2,335 people, 759 households, and 630 families residing in the township. The population density was 59.5 inhabitants per square mile (23.0/km^{2}). There were 783 housing units at an average density of 20.0 per square mile (7.7/km^{2}). The racial makeup of the township was 98.33% White, 0.13% Native American, 0.09% Asian, 1.24% from other races, and 0.21% from two or more races. Hispanic or Latino of any race were 2.23% of the population.

There were 759 households, out of which 39.4% had children under the age of 18 living with them, 75.2% were married couples living together, 4.5% had a female householder with no husband present, and 16.9% were non-families. 14.5% of all households were made up of individuals, and 4.6% had someone living alone who was 65 years of age or older. The average household size was 3.00 and the average family size was 3.29.

In the township the population was spread out, with 28.8% under the age of 18, 7.8% from 18 to 24, 27.7% from 25 to 44, 25.1% from 45 to 64, and 10.7% who were 65 years of age or older. The median age was 37 years. For every 100 females, there were 102.7 males. For every 100 females age 18 and over, there were 104.0 males.

The median income for a household in the township was $53,929, and the median income for a family was $57,552. Males had a median income of $41,275 versus $27,554 for females. The per capita income for the township was $22,868. About 1.7% of families and 5.4% of the population were below the poverty line, including 4.6% of those under age 18 and 1.2% of those age 65 or over.
