= Coopersville, Michigan =

City in Ottawa County, Michigan, United States

- City
- City of Coopersville
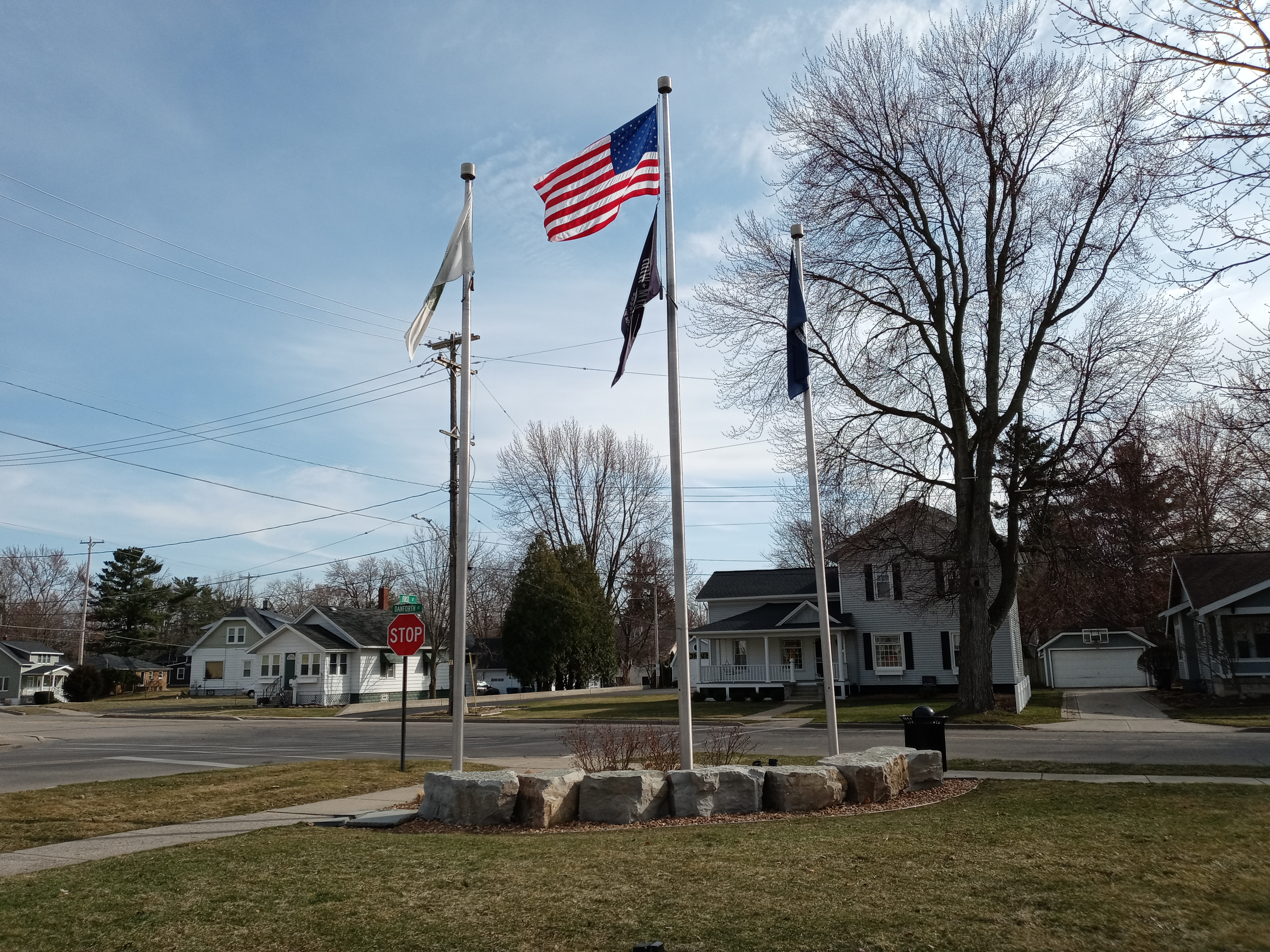
- Intersection of First and Danforth

- Flag Seal
- Motto: "United for Progress"
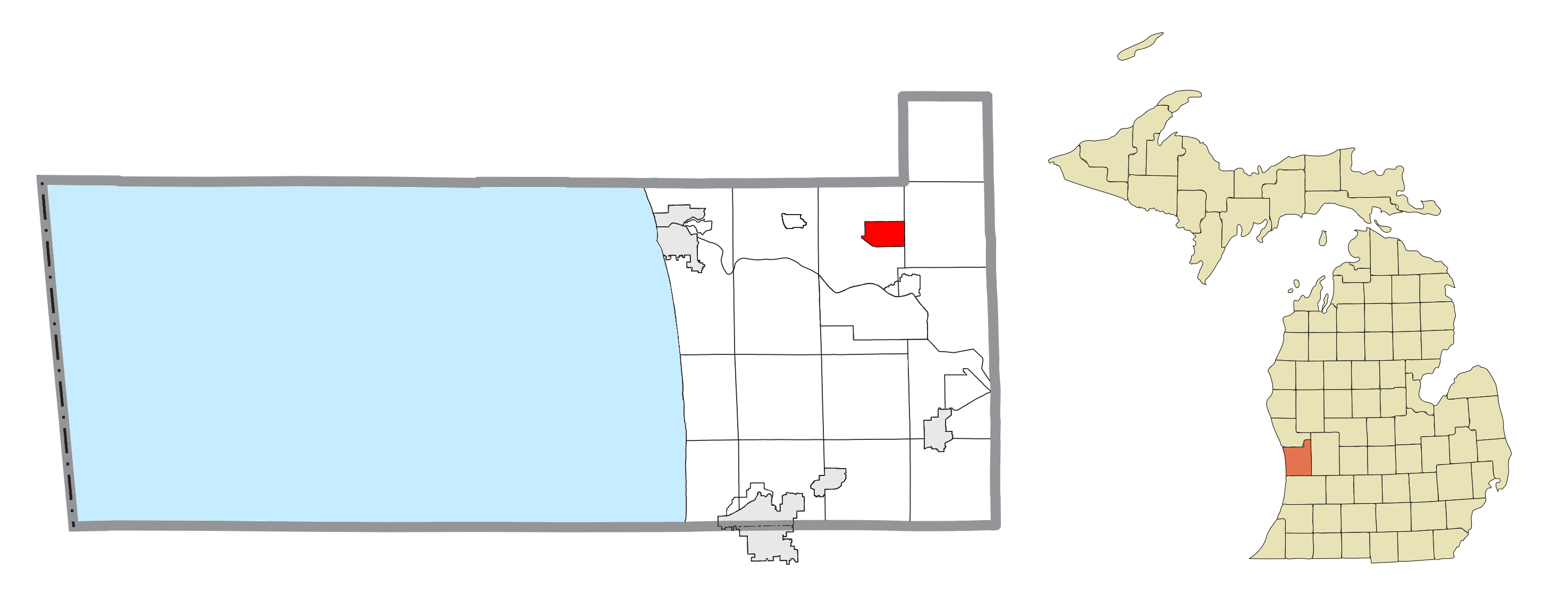
- Location within Ottawa County

- Location within the state of Michigan Location within the United States
- Coordinates: 43°03′50″N 85°56′10″W
- Country: United States
- State: Michigan
- County: Ottawa
- Settled: 1845
- Incorporated: 1871 (village); 1967 (city)

Government
  - Type: Council–manager
  - Mayor: Brian Mooney
  - Clerk: Kimberly Borgman
  - Manager: Dennis Luce

Area
  - Total: 4.81 sq mi (12.47 km^{2})
  - Land: 4.81 sq mi (12.46 km^{2})
  - Water: 0.0039 sq mi (0.01 km^{2})
- Elevation: 636 ft (193.8 m)

Population (2020)
  - Total: 4,828
  - Density: 1,003.6/sq mi (387.51/km^{2})
- Time zone: UTC-5 (EST)
  - Summer (DST): UTC-4 (EDT)
- ZIP code(s): 49404
- Area code: 616
- FIPS code: 26-18020
- GNIS feature ID: 0623797
- Website: Official website

Coopersville is a city located in north central Ottawa County in the U.S. state of Michigan. The population was 4,828 at the 2020 census. It is primarily a farming community.

The city is located within Polkton Township, though it is administratively autonomous. It lies just north of Interstate 96 along the eastern township boundary, adjacent to Wright Township on the east. There are two exits on I-96, one at the southeast corner of the city and the other at the southwest corner. The city has a post office and a public library.

Coopersville served as the primary filming location for the 2012 football film Touchback.

== Geography ==
According to the United States Census Bureau, the city has a total area of 4.81 square miles (12.46 km^{2}), all land. Over 50% of the land within the city limits is committed to agriculture.

== Demographics ==
Historical population
Census	Pop.	Note	%±
1880	645		—
1890	790		22.5%
1900	660		−16.5%
1910	814		23.3%
1920	914		12.3%
1930	1,004		9.8%
1940	1,083		7.9%
1950	1,371		26.6%
1960	1,584		15.5%
1970	2,129		34.4%
1980	2,889		35.7%
1990	3,421		18.4%
2000	3,910		14.3%
2010	4,275		9.3%
2020	4,828		12.9%

=== 2020 census ===
As of the 2020 census, there were 4,828 people, 1,755 households, and 1,568 families living in the city. The population density was 1003.74/sq mi, and the average family size was 3.38.

The median age in the city was 33.9 years. 29.6% of residents were under the age of 18 and 13.1% were 65 years of age or older. For every 100 females there were 92.9 males, and for every 100 females age 18 and over there were 88.7 males.

There were 1,755 households, of which 39.8% had children under the age of 18 living in them. Of all households, 47.2% were married-couple households, 16.2% were households with a male householder and no spouse or partner present, and 29.6% were households with a female householder and no spouse or partner present. About 27.5% of all households were made up of individuals, and 15.2% had someone living alone who was 65 years of age or older.

There were 1,813 housing units, of which 3.2% were vacant. The homeowner vacancy rate was 0.6% and the rental vacancy rate was 6.2%. 0.0% of residents lived in urban areas, while 100.0% lived in rural areas.

Racial composition as of the 2020 census
Race	Number	Percent
White	4,298	89.0%
Black or African American	65	1.3%
American Indian and Alaska Native	21	0.4%
Asian	25	0.5%
Native Hawaiian and Other Pacific Islander	5	0.1%
Some other race	109	2.3%
Two or more races	305	6.3%
Hispanic or Latino (of any race)	264	5.5%

=== 2010 census ===
As of the census of 2010, there were 4,275 people, 1,604 households, and 1,103 families living in the city. The population density was 888.8 inhabitants per square mile (343.2/km^{2}). There were 1,742 housing units at an average density of 362.2 per square mile (139.8/km^{2}). The racial makeup of the city was 95.5% White, 0.5% African American, 0.6% Native American, 0.7% Asian, 1.0% from other races, and 1.6% from two or more races. Hispanic or Latino of any race were 3.7% of the population.

There were 1,604 households, of which 39.8% had children under the age of 18 living with them, 51.2% were married couples living together, 13.3% had a female householder with no husband present, 4.2% had a male householder with no wife present, and 31.2% were non-families. 25.7% of all households were made up of individuals, and 12.2% had someone living alone who was 65 years of age or older. The average household size was 2.66 and the average family size was 3.23.

The median age in the city was 32.8 years. 29.3% of residents were under the age of 18; 9.8% were between the ages of 18 and 24; 27.8% were from 25 to 44; 22% were from 45 to 64; and 11.2% were 65 years of age or older. The gender makeup of the city was 48.3% male and 51.7% female.

=== 2000 census ===
As of the census of 2000, there were 3,910 people, 1,420 households, and 1,036 families living in the city. The population density was 812.5 inhabitants per square mile (313.7/km^{2}). There were 1,521 housing units at an average density of 316.1 per square mile (122.0/km^{2}). The racial makeup of the city was 96.37% White, 0.20% African American, 0.64% Native American, 0.69% Asian, 1.28% from other races, and 0.82% from two or more races. Hispanic or Latino of any race were 2.71% of the population.

Coopersville's Main Street during the 2007 Outhouse 500 races.

There were 1,420 households, out of which 39.6% had children under the age of 18 living with them, 57.9% were married couples living together, 11.7% had a female householder with no husband present, and 27.0% were non-families. 22.6% of all households were made up of individuals, and 8.9% had someone living alone who was 65 years of age or older. The average household size was 2.74 and the average family size was 3.21.

In the city, the population was spread out, with 30.2% under the age of 18, 10.9% from 18 to 24, 30.5% from 25 to 44, 18.3% from 45 to 64, and 10.1% who were 65 years of age or older. The median age was 31 years. For every 100 females, there were 93.9 males. For every 100 females age 18 and over, there were 86.2 males.

The median income for a household in the city was $48,875, and the median income for a family was $55,226. Males had a median income of $39,725 versus $22,464 for females. The per capita income for the city was $19,241. About 4.5% of families and 7.7% of the population were below the poverty line, including 5.4% of those under age 18 and 17.5% of those age 65 or over.

== Education ==
=== Primary and secondary schools ===
- Coopersville Area Public Schools
  - Coopersville High School
  - Coopersville Middle School
  - South Elementary
  - East Elementary
  - West Early Childhood Center

== Transportation ==
=== Railways ===
Coopersville and Marne Railway

=== Major highways ===
- I-96

== Notable people ==
- Butch Miller, a NASCAR driver
- Del Shannon, 1960s rock singer and guitarist
- Tim Steele, an ARCA racer
