= United States–Bangladesh Defence Foundational Agreements =

Proposed defence agreements between the United States and Bangladesh

US–Bangladesh Defence Foundational Agreements
- Parties: United States; Bangladesh
- Status: Proposed
- Key agreements: GSOMIA; ACSA

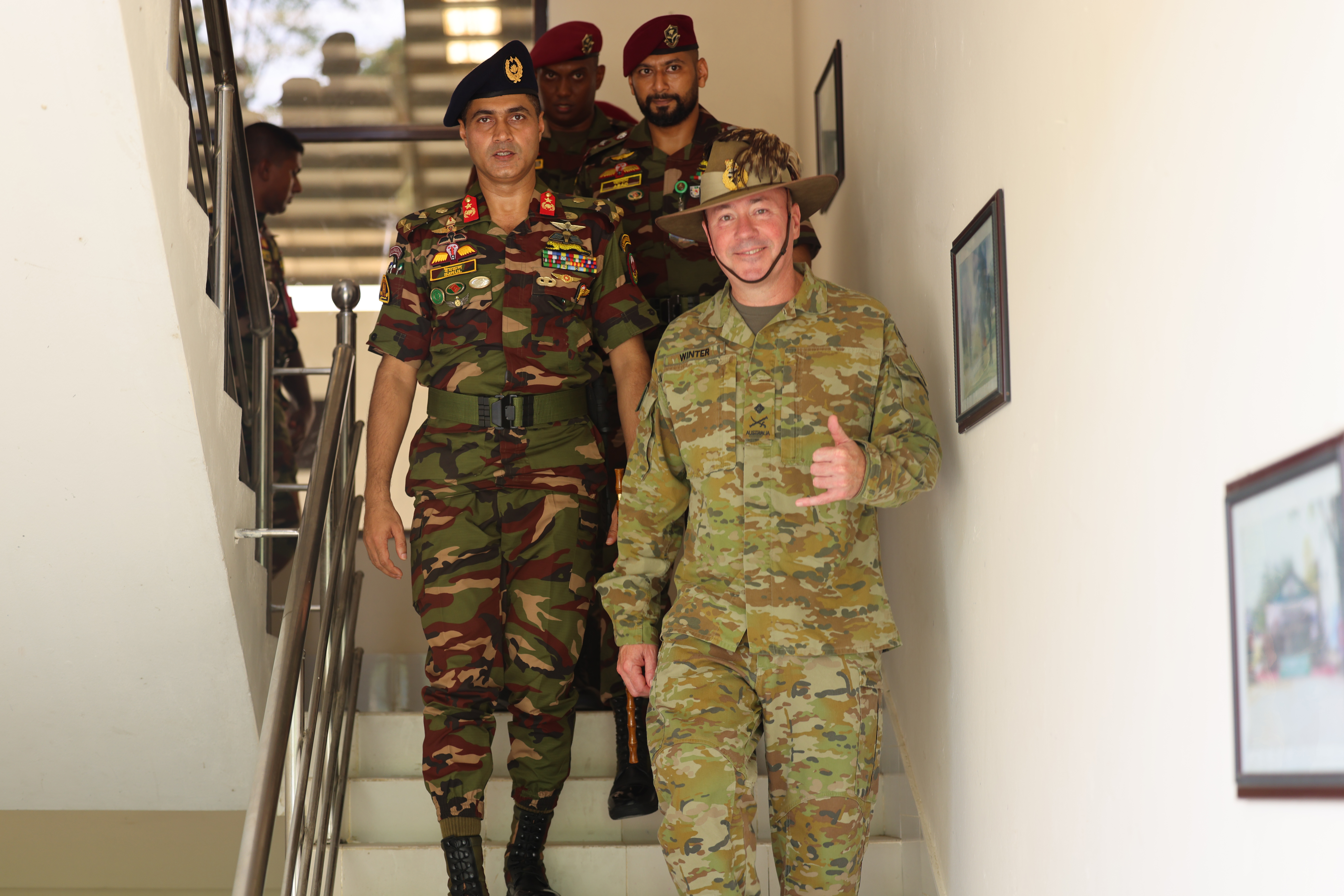
Bangladesh and United States military personnel during Exercise Tiger Lightning 2025 in Sylhet, Bangladesh, 25 July 2025.

The United States-Bangladesh Defence Foundational Agreements refer collectively to two proposed bilateral defence agreements between the United States and Bangladesh: the General Security of Military Information Agreement (GSOMIA) and the Acquisition and Cross-Servicing Agreement (ACSA). In October 2019, Bangladeshi and United States officials said that the two countries were in talks to conclude the agreements.

The two agreements have remained under discussion rather than entering into force. In May 2026, Bangladesh's state minister for foreign affairs, Shama Obaed, said that any defence agreement with the United States would be considered through consultations involving the government, armed forces and other relevant agencies.

== General Security of Military Information Agreement ==
The General Security of Military Information Agreement (GSOMIA) is a proposed agreement between Bangladesh and the United States concerning the exchange of sensitive information about military procurements. In April 2022, U.S. Ambassador to Bangladesh Peter D. Haas said that the agreement would set ground rules for exchanging such information and would provide a framework to enable Bangladesh to modernize its military with U.S. technology under its Forces Goal 2030.

Haas described GSOMIA and the Acquisition and Cross-Servicing Agreement (ACSA) as "technical agreements" rather than an alliance or military pact. He said that the two agreements were intended as building blocks for closer defence cooperation and to support Bangladesh's own defence goals.

GSOMIA was subsequently discussed during bilateral security and defence dialogues. In April 2022, The Daily Star reported that Bangladesh and the United States had discussed GSOMIA during the eighth US–Bangladesh Security Dialogue in Washington.

In January 2023, the United States remained interested in GSOMIA as part of expanded defence cooperation with Bangladesh.

In 2026, the proposed agreement remained under discussion. Bangladesh's state minister for foreign affairs said in May that consideration of GSOMIA and ACSA involved the foreign ministry, armed forces and other stakeholders.

== Acquisition and Cross-Servicing Agreement ==
The Acquisition and Cross-Servicing Agreement (ACSA) is a proposed framework for logistical cooperation between Bangladesh and the United States. It was discussed alongside GSOMIA as part of the proposed expansion of bilateral defence cooperation.

The Acquisition and Cross-Servicing Agreement (ACSA) would provide a framework for the procurement and payment of common logistical support, supplies and services between the armed forces of the United States and Bangladesh. The agreement could facilitate the transfer of fuel and other logistical support between the two militaries.

An ACSA would not commit either country to military action or authorize the stationing of foreign ships, aircraft or military personnel. Its purpose would be to simplify logistical support arrangements between the two armed forces.

== Defence trade ==
Although separate from GSOMIA and ACSA, the Agreement on Reciprocal Trade between Bangladesh and the United States, signed on 9 February 2026, includes provisions related to economic and national security.

The agreement also provides for increased purchases of U.S. military equipment by Bangladesh and limits on defence equipment purchases from certain countries.

== Military exercises ==
Military exercises have formed another component of Bangladesh–United States defence cooperation. In July 2026, the two countries conducted Exercise Tiger Lightning in Sylhet, involving personnel from the Bangladesh Army and the United States Army Pacific.

According to Anadolu Agency, Exercise Tiger Lightning was a 13-day joint military exercise involving 184 service members, including 91 from the United States and 93 from Bangladesh. The exercise was intended to strengthen military cooperation, readiness and interoperability between the two forces.

The exercise was part of the broader defence relationship between Bangladesh and the United States rather than a component of GSOMIA or ACSA themselves.

== Negotiations ==
=== 2019 ===
The proposed agreements received significant media coverage in October 2019 when US and Bangladeshi officials confirmed that the two countries were discussing GSOMIA and ACSA. bdnews24.com reported that the agreements were being considered to facilitate closer defence relations, defence trade, information sharing and military-to-military cooperation.

The Daily Star separately reported that the United States wanted Bangladesh to conclude the two agreements as part of expanding bilateral defence cooperation.

=== 2022 ===
The negotiations continued in 2022. During the eighth US–Bangladesh Security Dialogue in Washington in April, GSOMIA and ACSA were among the defence issues discussed by the two sides.

The Daily Star reported that the two agreements were being considered in the context of closer defence cooperation and that Bangladesh was examining the proposed arrangements.

=== 2023 ===
In January 2023, The Daily Star reported that the United States and Bangladesh had held talks on defence cooperation and that Washington continued to seek GSOMIA and ACSA.

In August 2023, Bangladesh's foreign minister said that the country would not sign the agreements before the national election. Dhaka Tribune reported that GSOMIA and ACSA therefore remained under discussion rather than being concluded.

=== 2026 ===
The agreements remained the subject of public and governmental discussion in 2026. In May, State Minister for Foreign Affairs Shama Obaed Islam said that Bangladesh would consider any defence agreement with the United States only after consultations with relevant government agencies and assessment of the country's interests.

The minister specifically identified GSOMIA and ACSA when discussing the proposed defence agreements.

The continued discussion in 2026 followed several years of reporting and negotiations concerning the two agreements.

== See also ==
- Bangladesh–United States relations
- Foreign relations of Bangladesh
- Bangladesh Armed Forces
- General Security of Military Information Agreement
- Acquisition and Cross-Servicing Agreement
- 2026 US–Bangladesh Reciprocal Trade Agreement
