= Bangladesh–United States relations =

- Bangladesh: United States

Diplomatic mission
- Embassy of Bangladesh, Washington, D.C.: Embassy of the United States, Dhaka

Envoy
- Bangladeshi Ambassador to the United States Tareq Md Ariful Islam: Chargé d'affaires ad interim to Bangladesh Brent T. Christensen

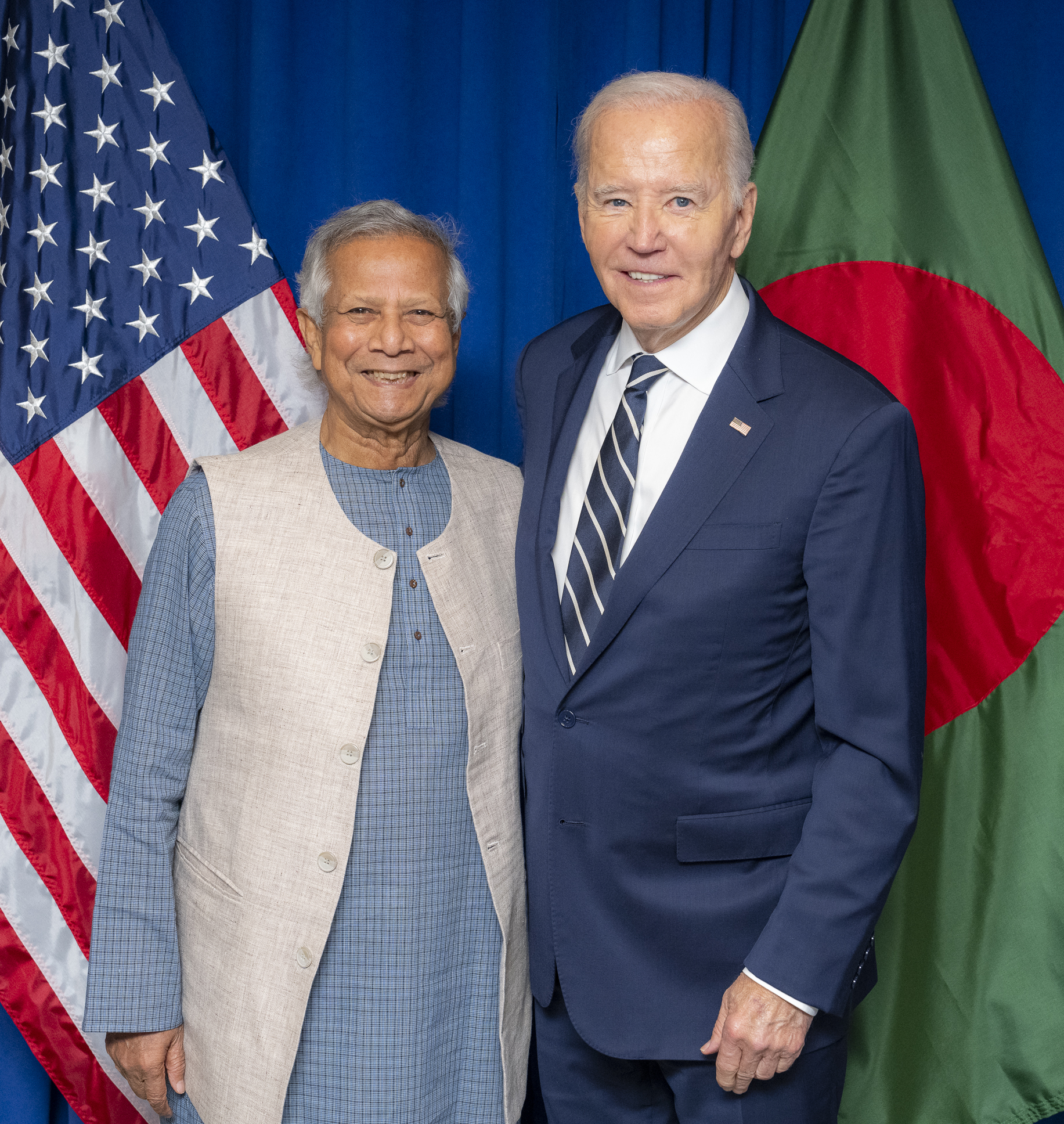
US President Joe Biden with Chief Adviser of Bangladesh Muhammad Yunus at the UN Headquarters in the New York City, September 2024

Bangladesh–United States relations are the bilateral relations between the People's Republic of Bangladesh and the United States. For the United States, Bangladesh is the 38th largest goods supplier and 60th largest export market. For Bangladesh, the United States is the largest export market. The two countries signed a bilateral investment treaty in 1986. U.S. companies are the largest foreign investors in Bangladesh. The U.S. government is the leading contributor of humanitarian assistance in response to the Rohingya crisis. Both nations have announced similar views for a Free and Open Indo-Pacific.

Bangladesh has an embassy in Washington D.C., and consulates in New York City and Los Angeles. The United States has an embassy in Dhaka, with information centers in Chittagong, Jessore, Rajshahi and Sylhet. The U.S. Embassy in Bangladesh also operates the Archer K Blood American Library and the Edward M Kennedy Centre in Dhaka. Both countries are members of the United Nations. In 2014, 76% of Bangladeshis expressed a favorable view of the United States, one of the highest ratings for the countries surveyed in South Asia. The introduction of the new defense equipment will serve to bolster UN peacekeeping endeavors and other missions within Bangladesh. The United States government has committed to supplying the Bangladesh Armed Forces with additional weaponry and equipment to reinforce its capacity to safeguard its sovereignty.

== History ==
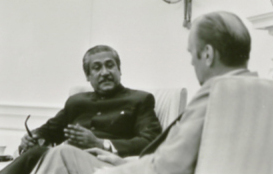
Sheikh Mujibur Rahman with Gerald Ford at the Oval Office in 1974

Relations between Bengal and the United States can be traced to 1792 when President George Washington nominated Benjamin Joy as the first American envoy to the Bengal Presidency. The British East India Company initially refused to accept the envoy, but an American consulate was eventually established for Fort William. The American consulate in Bengal was one of the first U.S. diplomatic posts in Asia. Chittagong was one of the seven ports under the jurisdiction of the American consulate in Fort William, along with Aden in Yemen and Rangoon in Burma. American traders collected artwork, handicrafts, terracotta, sculptures, religious and literary texts, manuscripts, and military weapons from Dhaka and other places in Bengal, with many objects that can be found in the Peabody Essex Museum.

In World War II, substantial American naval, air and army forces were stationed in eastern Bengal as part of the Burma Campaign. The United States established a consulate general in Dhaka, East Bengal on 29 August 1949, following the partition of India and east Bengal becoming the eastern wing of the Dominion of Pakistan. American teachers, architects and aid workers frequented the capital of East Pakistan in the 1960s.

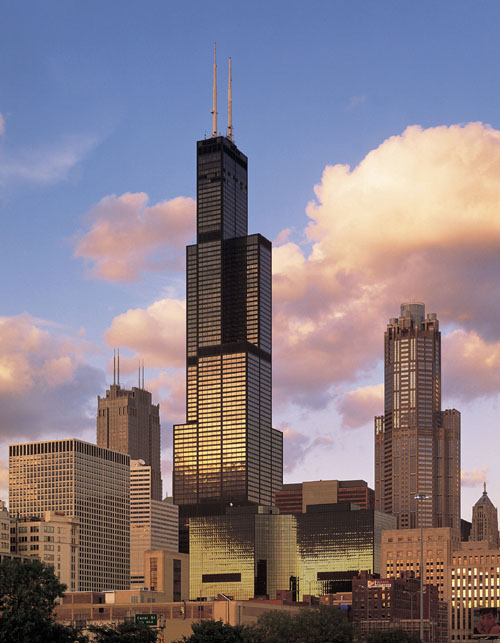
The Sears Tower was designed by the Bangladeshi-American architect F R Khan

During the Bangladesh War of Independence in 1971, American diplomats, led by the consul general in Dacca, Archer Blood, sent a series of telegrams detailing atrocities committed by the Pakistani military against Bengalis. They dissented with the Nixon administration's policy of ignoring the genocide due to the close American alliance with the Pakistani military junta. Within the US, public opinion also turned against Nixon for his policy on Bangladesh. Henry Kissinger later admitted that US policy on Bangladesh was a "misjudgment", remarking that "the [Bangladesh] crisis burst upon us while Pakistan was our only channel to China" during the rapprochement between Beijing and Washington.

Both Democratic and Republican lawmakers, including Ted Kennedy, Frank Church, and William B. Saxbe, denounced the Nixon White House for its silence on the "systematic oppression" in East Pakistan. American cultural figures like the poet Allen Ginsberg (who wrote September on Jessore Road) and the singer Joan Baez promoted awareness of the Bangladesh War. The Concert for Bangladesh was organized in New York City by British, American and Indian musicians; and featured American icons like Bob Dylan. The U.S. Congress imposed an arms embargo on Pakistan; but despite that, the Nixon White House sent secret arms shipments to the junta. When India intervened in December 1971, the White House dispatched an aircraft carrier to the Bay of Bengal. Peace activists blocked arms shipments in several northeastern American ports. Bengali diplomats at the Pakistani embassy in Washington, D.C., defected and operated a mission of the Provisional Government of Bangladesh.

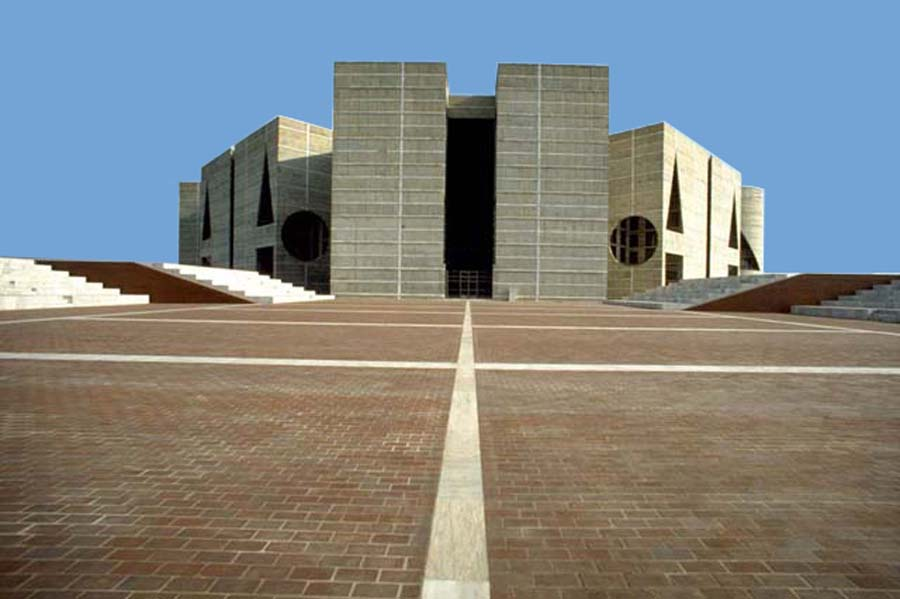
The Jatiyo Sangshad Bhaban was designed by the American architect Louis Kahn

After the formation of Bangladesh in December 1971 and the withdrawal of Indian troops in March 1972, the United States formally recognized the newly independent country on 4 April 1972, and pledged US$300 million in aid. Herbert D. Spivack was the principal American diplomatic officer in Dhaka at the time. Four days later, the United States and Bangladesh agreed to establish diplomatic relations at the embassy level. The consulate-general was officially upgraded to an embassy on 18 May 1972. Relations between Bangladesh and the American-led Western world dramatically improve in the late 1970s, when President Ziaur Rahman reversed the socialist policies of the first post-independence government and restored free markets. In 1983, military ruler Lieutenant General Hussain Muhammad Ershad was invited to the White House for talks with President Ronald Reagan. Reagan praised Dhaka for its role in the Cold War, stating "the United States wishes to applaud Bangladesh, a member of the nonaligned movement, for its constructive approach to issues of regional and global concern. To cite only a few examples: Bangladesh clearly manifested its courage and resolve in its unswerving responses to aggression in Afghanistan and Kampuchea. It also took the lead in establishing the South Asian Regional Cooperation Organization, a body designed to build a more prosperous and stable region for the people of South Asia. Bangladesh's foreign policy has exhibited an activism, moderation, and force of moral conviction which has earned the respect of the world".

The United States has been one of Bangladesh's principal development partners since independence, providing over US$6 billion through USAID since 1972. It has helped set up important infrastructure in the country, including NASA assistance for the Space Research and Remote Sensing Organization (SPARRSO) and a TRIGA research reactor in the Bangladesh Atomic Energy Commission.

Bangladeshi nobel laureate and current chief adviser of the Interim government of Bangladesh, Muhammad Yunus, was awarded the US Presidential Medal of Freedom and the US Congressional Gold Medal, the highest civilian honours of the United States.

== Present relations ==
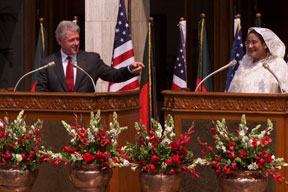
Bill Clinton with Sheikh Hasina in Dhaka, 2000

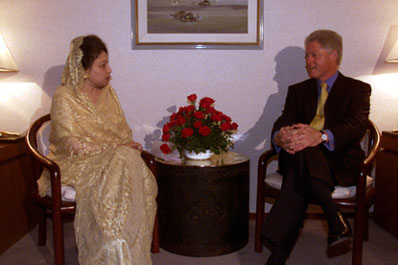
Bill Clinton with Khaleda Zia in Dhaka, 2000

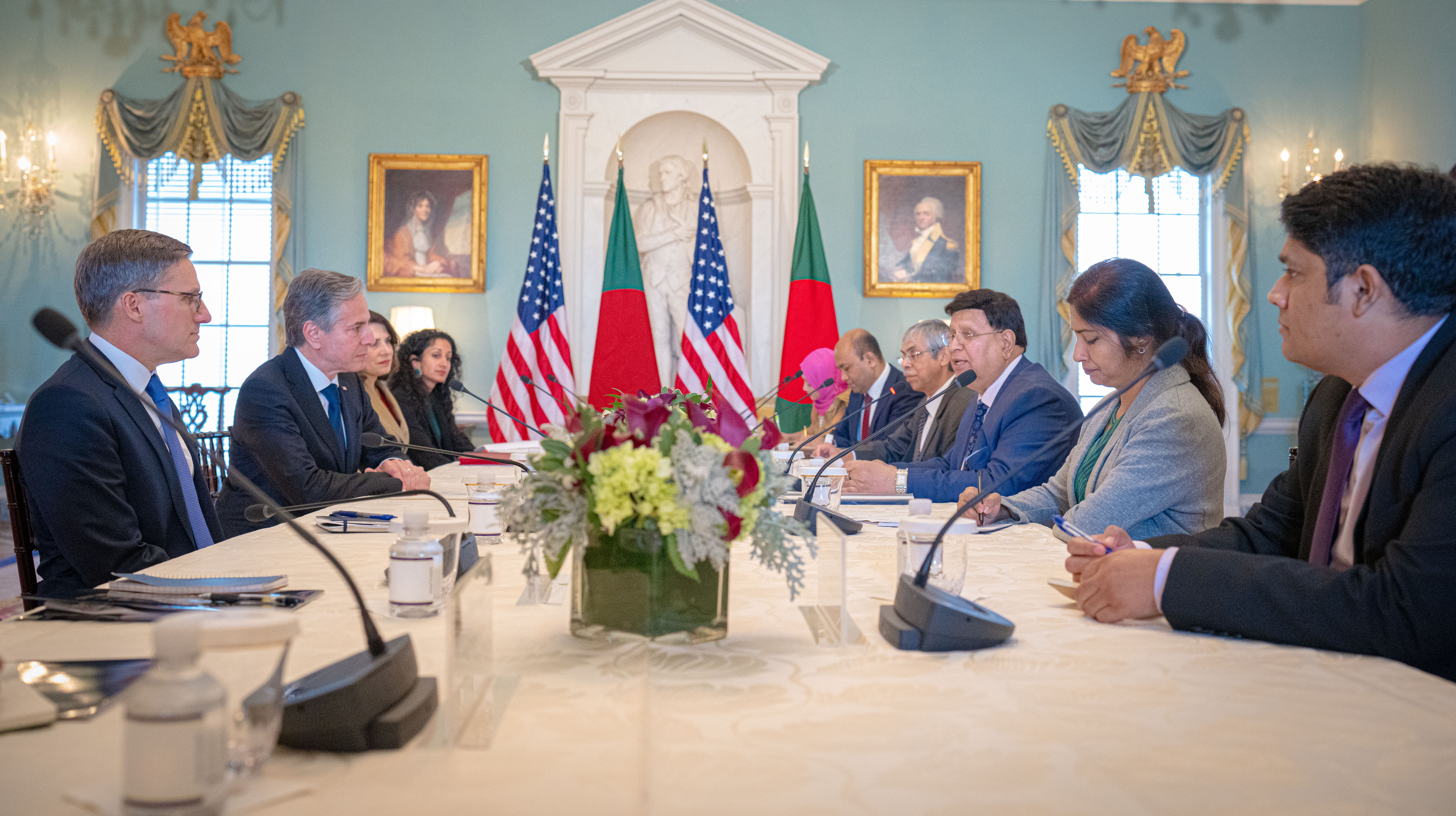
U.S. Secretary of State Antony Blinken and Foreign Minister of Bangladesh AK Abdul Momen meet with their delegations in April 2023

Bangladesh is a major American ally in South Asia. The two countries have extensive cooperation on matters of regional and global security, counter terrorism and climate change. Bangladesh has been a key participant in the Obama administration's main international development initiatives, including food security, healthcare and the environment. Since June 2021, the United States has shared 114,570,820 safe and effective COVID-19 vaccine doses with the people of Bangladesh – free of cost. Bangladesh is the largest recipient of U.S. COVID-19 vaccine donations with over 150 million dosages. Since the beginning of the pandemic, U.S. support has trained more than 50,000 healthcare providers and other workers on safely administering vaccines across 64 districts, donated 18 freezer vans, 750 freezer units, and 8,000 vaccine carriers to help transport 71 million doses of vaccines to remote areas and directly administered 84 million vaccinations.

After the Biden administration imposed visa sanctions on Bangladeshi officials for human rights and other reasons, it was severely criticized by former Prime Minister and Awami League leader, Sheikh Hasina.

== Trade and investment ==
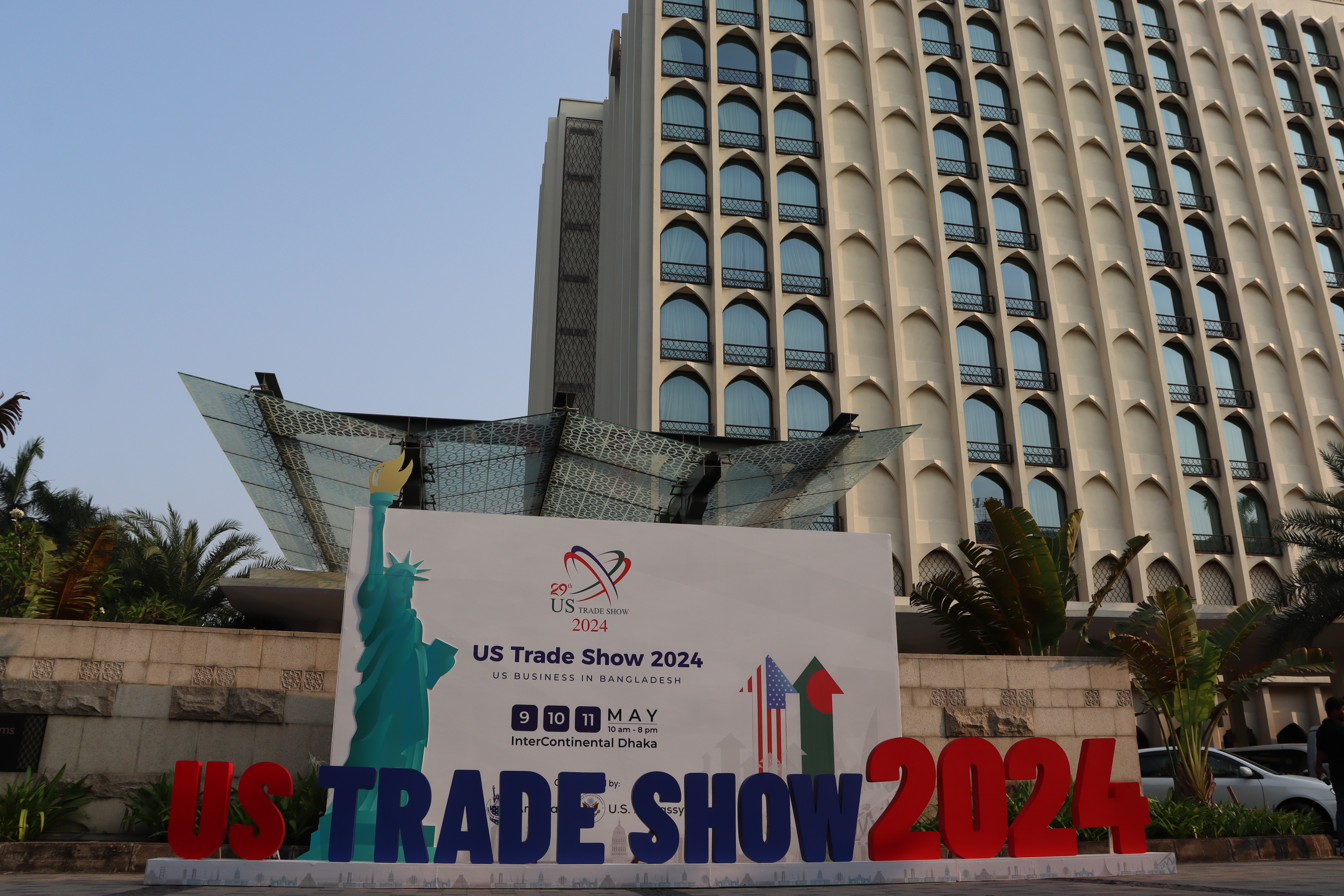
US Trade Show 2024 at the InterContinental Dhaka was sponsored by US Embassy Dhaka and AmCham Bangladesh.

The United States is the largest export market for Bangladesh. The U.S. is also one of the largest sources of foreign direct investment in Bangladesh. The biggest American investment in the country are the operations of Chevron, which produces 50% of Bangladesh's natural gas. Bilateral trade in 2014 stood at US$6 billion. The main American exports to Bangladesh are agricultural products (soybeans, cotton, wheat, dairy), aircraft, machinery, engines, and iron and steel products. American imports from Bangladesh include apparel, footwear, and textile products; toys, games and sporting goods; shrimp and prawns; and agricultural products.

In June 2013, following the 2013 Savar building collapse that led to over 1,000 deaths, the United States suspended a preferential trade agreement with Bangladesh that allowed for duty-free access to the US market over poor safety standards. The Bangladesh Foreign Ministry then issued a statement that read: "It cannot be more shocking for the factory workers of Bangladesh that the decision to suspend Generalized System of Preferences (GSP) comes at a time when the government of Bangladesh has taken concrete and visible measures to improve factory safety and protect workers' rights."

However, on the service sector export front, the United States is the largest export destination for Bangladesh's ICT industry accounting for 34 percent of Bangladesh's ICT exports (Latifee, E. H., 2022). Besides, the U.S. is the largest ICT market in the world representing 33 percent of the total or approximately US$ 1.8 trillion market size in 2022 with more than 0.52 million software and IT services companies collectively contributing 9.3 percent to the United States GDP making them the top ICT export destination for Bangladesh as the USA has also the highest ICT spending per-capita.

In July 2025, with a looming threat of 35% tariffs on Bangladeshi exports, the Government of Bangladesh signed a Memorandum of Understanding with U.S. Wheat Associates, thus committing to purchase 700,000 metric tons of wheat from US annually for the next five years. Following the deal, the tariffs imposed on Bangladesh in August were negotiated down to 20%.

In 2026, the two countries signed the 2026 US–Bangladesh Reciprocal Trade Agreement to reduce tariffs and strengthen economic ties. While it provided Bangladesh with more structured access to the US market, the agreement has also received criticism for constraining Bangladesh's ability to maneuver among competing major powers. Skeptics among intellectuals and academicians have portrayed the ART as "a structurally unequal instrument" that "effectively narrowed Bangladesh’s economic sovereignty." Critics described the deal as systematically asymmetric. Some of the constituents of the agreement under criticism include Article 6.4 that allows US to reimpose tariffs over non-compliance, and Articles 3.2 and 4.3 that allow for unilateral termination of agreement by the US.

== Defense cooperation ==
=== Overview ===
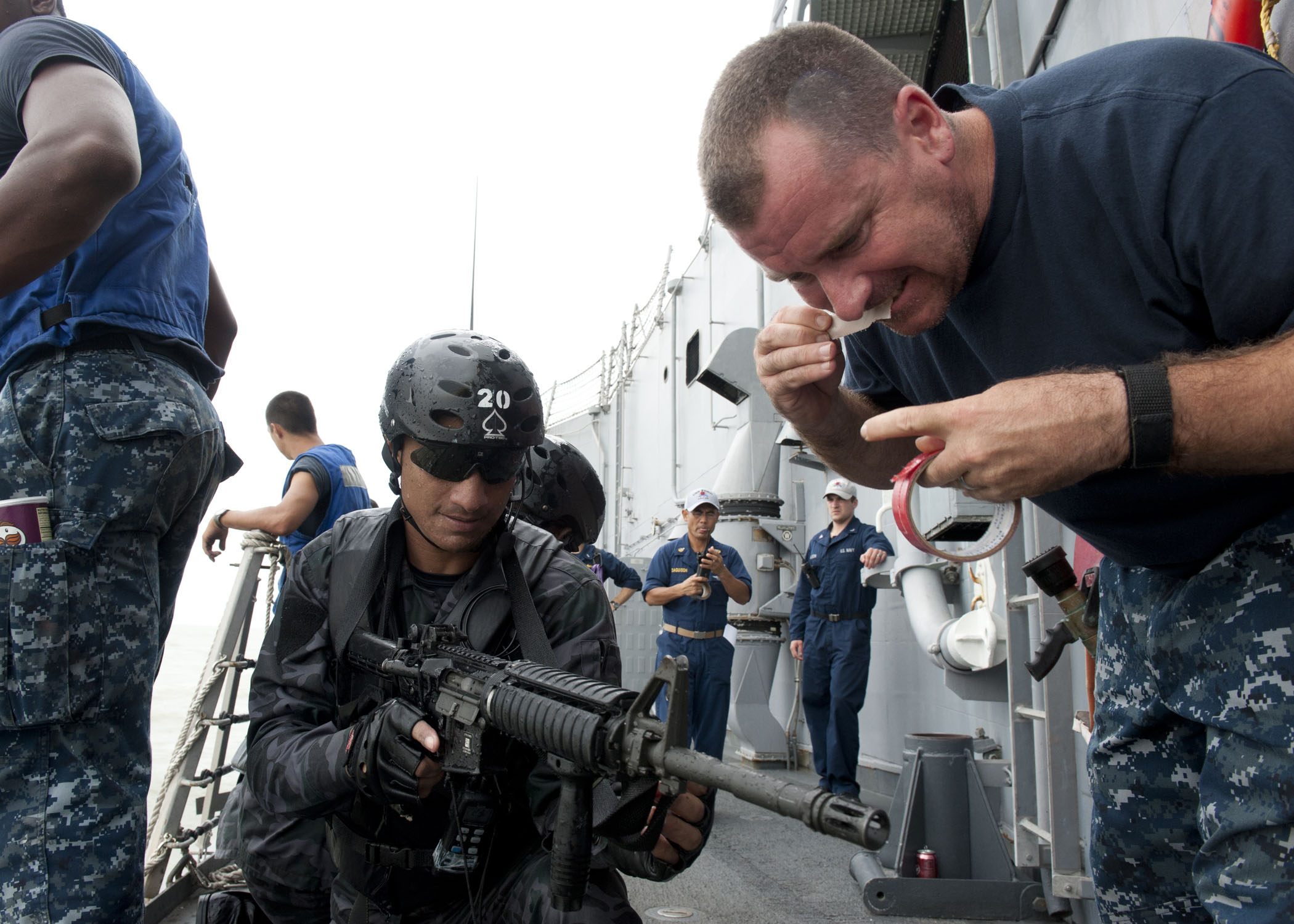
SWADS personnel with the US Navy in 2011

The United States is one of Bangladesh's principal strategic military allies. American defense cooperation is seen as a counterweight to regional powers India and China, as well as Russia. Joint exercises are held on a regular basis, particularly in the Bay of Bengal. The U.S. Indo-Pacific Command maintains regular engagements with the Bangladesh Armed Forces. The U.S. has also helped set up the elite SWADS marine unit in the Bangladesh Navy, which is modeled on American and South Korean special forces.

Bangladesh is one of the world's largest contributors to UN peacekeeping. The United States has been a vital supporter of Bangladeshi peacekeeping engagements. In May 2026, Bangladesh said that any defence agreement with the United States or another country would only be signed after consultations with relevant agencies to ensure that it served the interests of the country and its people. Regarding the proposed US-Bangladesh Defence Foundational Agreements, including the General Security of Military Information Agreement (GSOMIA) and Acquisition and Cross-Servicing Agreement (ACSA), State Minister for Foreign Affairs Shama Obaded Islam said that no discussion on military agreements had taken place during here recent visit to the United States. .

=== Involvement in military engagements ===
Bangladesh has engaged and added itself to several military operations alongside the United States. During the Gulf war, Bangladesh joined the coalition and send around 2,300 troops. Bangladeshi troops engaged fight with the Iraqi forces during the Kuwait campaign. Several Bangladeshi troops died during the war.

On 1994, after the takeover of Haiti governance by military junta, the U.S. stepped up a plot to intervention in Haiti. Despite several calls to restore democracy, the military junta didn't withdrew from governance. The U.S. finally plotted to intervene in Haiti. A multinational coalition was built. Bangladesh also joined the coalition with desire, sending around 1,050 troops to intervene. Coalition invaded at Haiti on 19 September. However, as the military junta finally accepted final ultimatum given by the coalition, there was no bloodshed and the conflict ended with diplomacy.

== Education and culture ==
There were 7,496 Bangladeshi students in U.S. universities in 2018, making Bangladesh 24th in the world among countries sending students to USA, and 10th in the world for sending Graduate level students. The American Embassy in Bangladesh operates and supports several Education Consultancy Centers in Dhaka, Chittagong, Sylhet and Rajshahi. Besides American Center, US Embassy also support the Edward M. Kennedy Center for Public Service & Arts and operates Archer K. Blood Library in Dhaka. On the cultural front, Sisimpur, a USAID-funded Bangladeshi version of Sesame Street, is the most watched children's program on Bangladeshi television.

== Disaster management ==
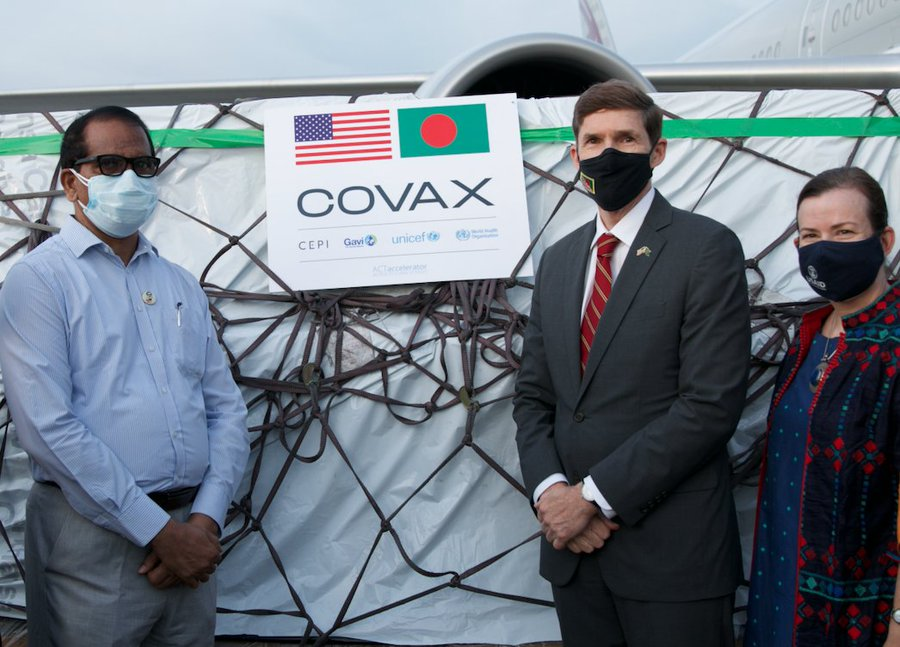
The US delivers COVID-19 vaccines to Bangladesh as part of the COVAX program in 2021

The United States has assisted Bangladesh during cyclone relief operations in 1991 and 2007. Operation Sea Angel One in 1991 and Operation Sea Angel Two in 2007 saw US Marines joining Bangladeshi troops in providing relief to thousands of people in southern Bangladesh who suffered as a result of the 1991 Bangladesh Cyclone and Cyclone Sidr.

== Bangladeshi diaspora in the U.S. ==
The US-Bangladesh relationship is strengthened by the Bangladeshi-American community. Fazlur Rahman Khan designed the United States's tallest tower in Chicago. Sal Khan is a prominent educationist. Hansen Clarke was the first U.S. congressman of Bangladeshi origin. M. Osman Siddique served as the US Ambassador to Fiji.

== Public opinion ==
According to a 2026 Pew Research Center survey, 26% of Bangladeshis had a favorable view of the United States, while 63% had a negative view.

== See also ==
- Bangladeshi-Americans
- 2026 US–Bangladesh Reciprocal Trade Agreement
- US–Bangladesh Defence Foundational Agreements
