= Chinese people in Bangladesh =

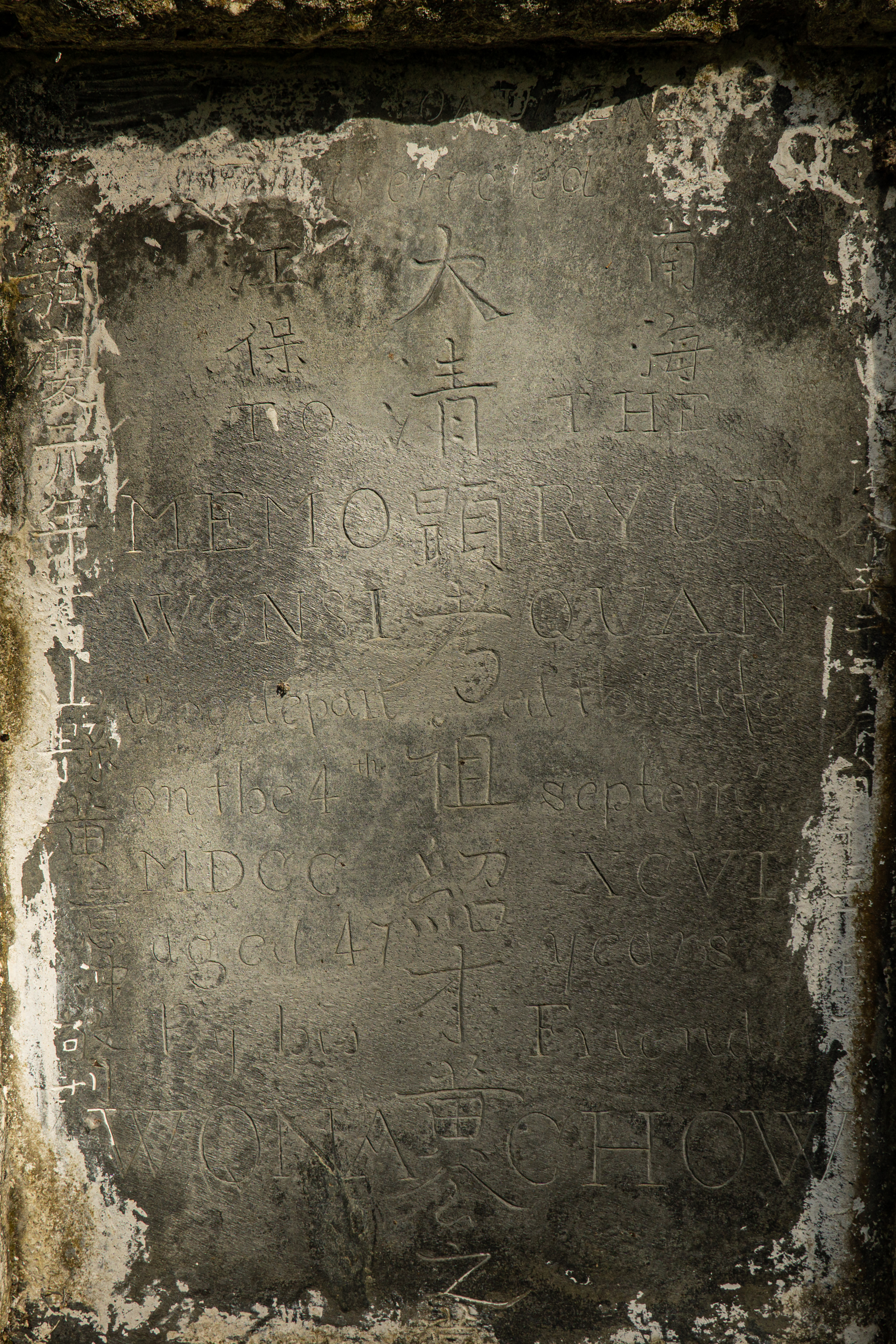
- Chinese grave (Wonsi Quan, died 1796) in Christian cemetery, Dhaka

Total population
- 166,646 (2017)

Regions with significant populations
- Dhaka • Chittagong • Khulna • Sylhet • Cox's Bazar

Languages
- Mandarin Chinese • Bengali • English • Hakka Chinese • Cantonese • Varieties of Chinese

Religion
- Majority: Atheism • Buddhism • Taoism • Confucianism • Chinese Folk Religions; Minority: Islam • Christianity

Chinese people in Bangladesh
- Traditional Chinese: 孟加拉國華人
- Simplified Chinese: 孟加拉国华人
Transcriptions
Standard Mandarin
- Hanyu Pinyin: Mèngjiālāguó huárén
Hakka
- Pha̍k-fa-sṳ: Mung-gai-loet fa-ngìn
Yue: Cantonese
- Yale Romanization: Muhnggāilāgwok wàh yàhn
Southern Min
- Hokkien POJ: Bāng-ka-la-kok hôa-jîn

Alternative Chinese name
- Traditional Chinese: 孟加拉國華僑
- Simplified Chinese: 孟加拉国华侨
Transcriptions
Standard Mandarin
- Hanyu Pinyin: Mèngjiālāguó huáqiáo
Hakka
- Pha̍k-fa-sṳ: Mung-gai-loet fa-kiau
Yue: Cantonese
- Yale Romanization: Muhnggāilāgwok wàh kìuh
Southern Min
- Hokkien POJ: Bāng-ka-la-kok hôa-kiâu

Bengali name
- Bengali: বাংলাদেশে চীনা জনগণ

There are 166,646 Chinese citizens and nationals who live in Bangladesh. Most Chinese expatriates are based in Dhaka and Chittagong, and consist largely of diplomats or employees of foreign companies.

Chinese food enjoys large popularity and is widespread in Bangladesh, with there even being Bangladeshi-style Chinese cuisine. Chinese women in Dhaka have a reputation for running popular beauty parlours.

Social and cultural events such as the Mid-Autumn Festival and the Chinese New Year are celebrated quite often by those who cannot go home. There is also a local organisation, Bangladesh-China People's Friendship Association (BCPFA), which has been active since 1986.

According to the history book, Book of Later Han, China had connection with Bangladesh during Eastern Han dynasty. Since the eighteenth century, obvious Chinese community appeared in Bangladesh.

== See also ==
- Bangladesh – People's Republic of China relations

Related immigration articles:

- Burmese Chinese
- Chinese people in Pakistan
- Chinese people in Sri Lanka
