= Southfield Town Center =

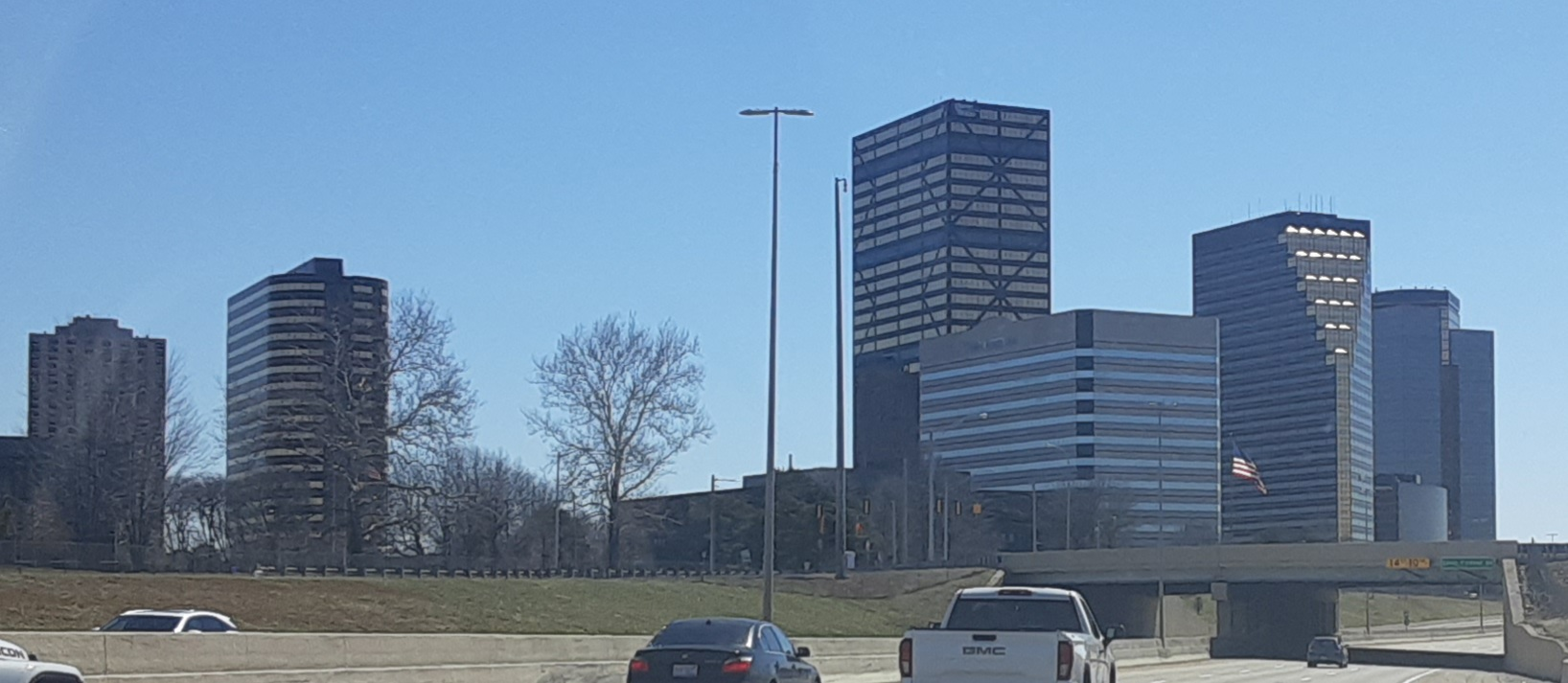
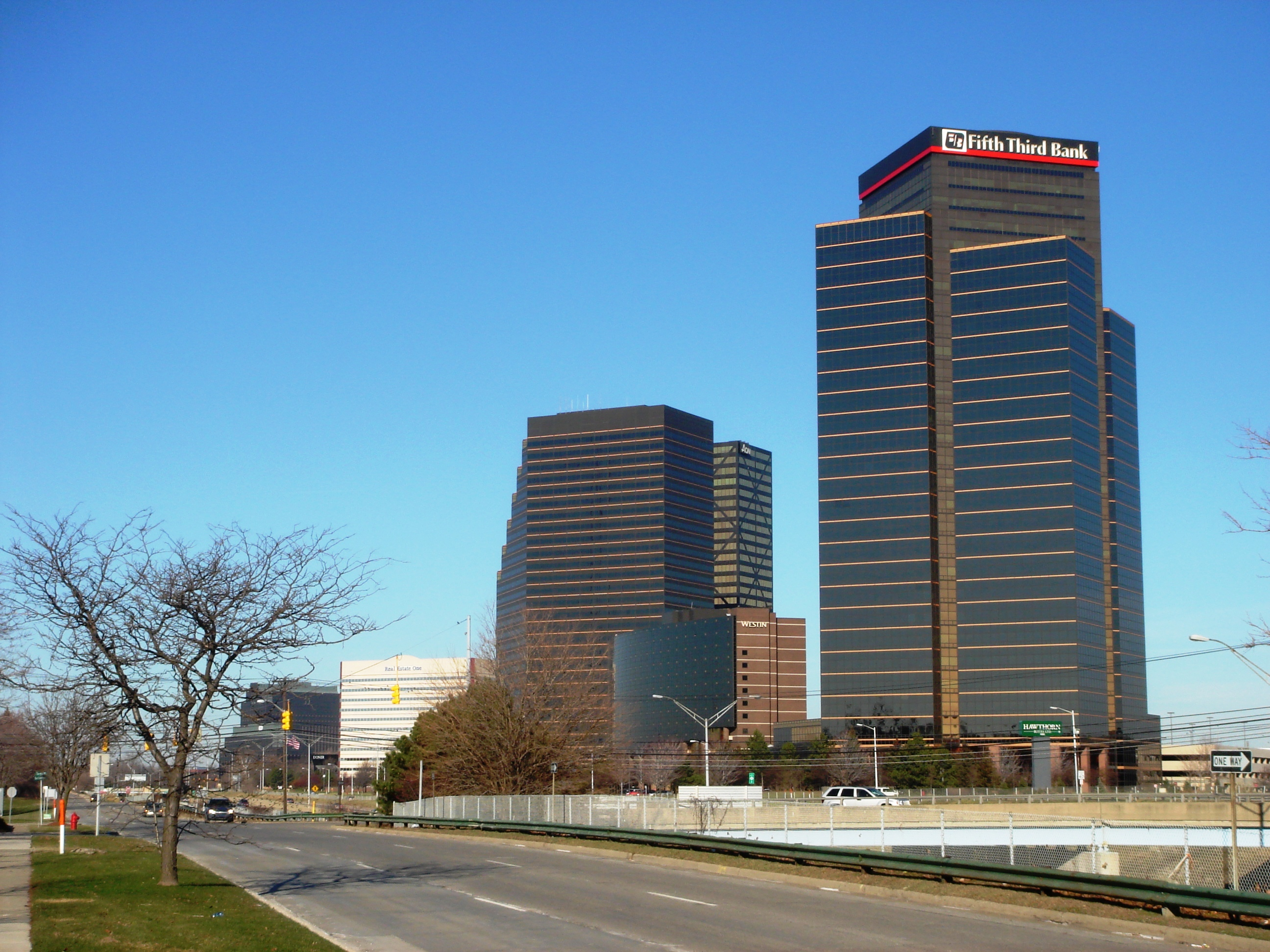
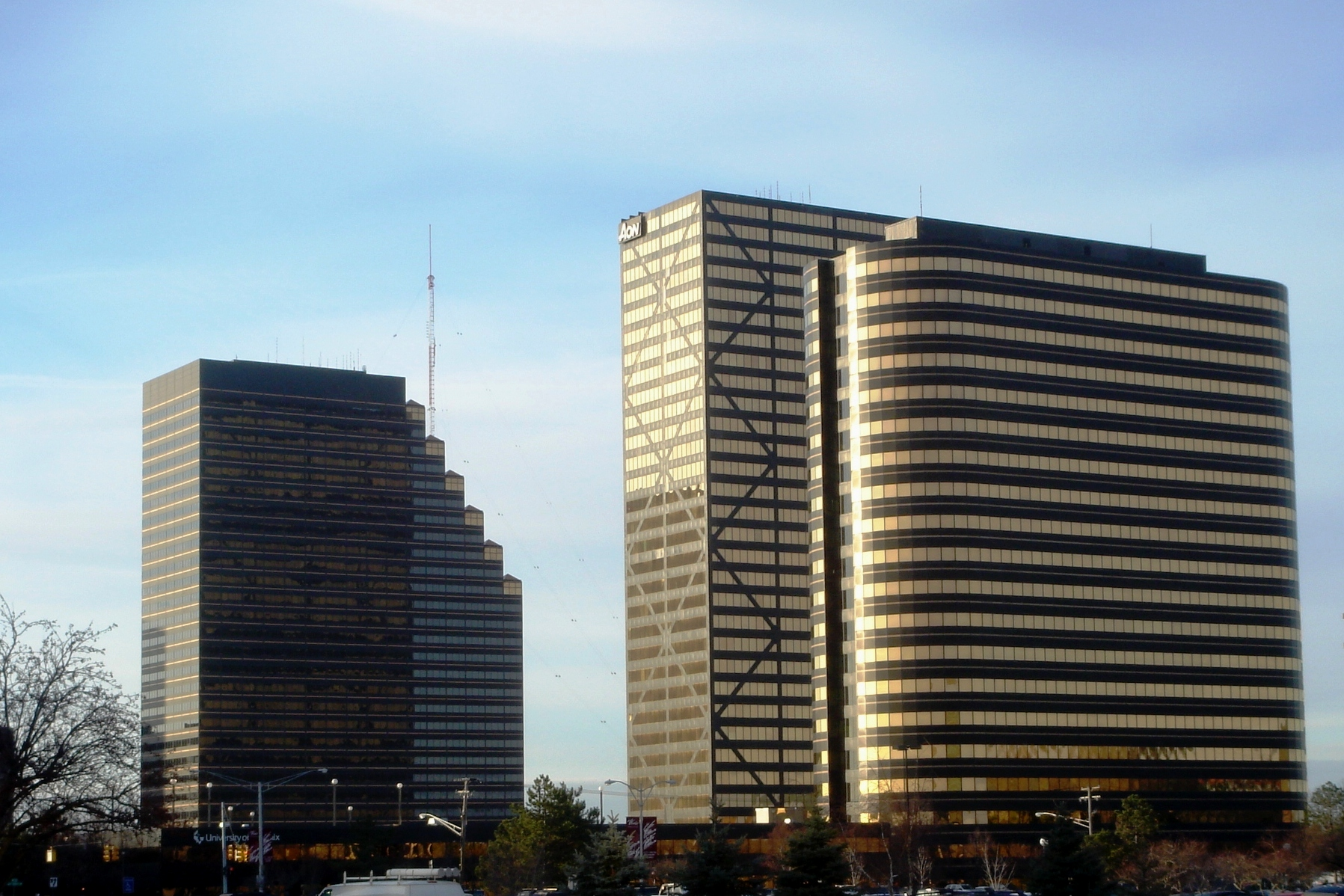
- Southfield Town Center
- Interactive map of the Southfield Town Center area

General information
- Type: office/hotel/retail
- Architectural style: Modern architecture
- Location: Southfield, Michigan; United States
- Coordinates: 42°28′35.8″N 83°14′43″W
- Construction started: 1975
- Completed: 1989
- Owner: 601 Companies

Technical details
- Floor count: 32 story tower 28 story tower 28 story tower 20 story tower 12 story hotel
- Floor area: 2.2 million ft^{2} office complex (204,400 m^{2}) (total excludes 33 story residential tower)

Design and construction
- Architects: Neuhaus & Taylor; 3D International (3D/I); Sikes Jennings Kelly & Brewer

Website
- www.southfieldtowncenter.com

The Southfield Town Center is a cluster of five interconnected high-rise buildings forming a contemporary 2,200,000-square-foot (204,400 m^{2}) office complex in the Detroit suburb of Southfield, Michigan. It includes the Westin Southfield Detroit Hotel, restaurants, a fitness center, and a major conference center for up to 1,000 attendees. This office-hotel complex is situated along Town Center Drive off M-10 (Lodge Freeway), across from Lawrence Technological University in Metro Detroit, with many of its tallest buildings named after their addresses along the road. Separately, there is a 33-story luxury residential high-rise at 5000 Town Center. The American Center, another 26-story office tower near the confluence of Interstate 696 (I-696) and M-10, is not part of the complex.

The Town Center is across from the Civic Centre, and it is located between West 10 Mile Road and I-696, M-10, and Evergreen Road, as well as being close to the Mixing Bowl.

An enclosed two-story garden atrium connects the hotel with the towers of the Southfield Town Center. The atrium area also contains 94,000 square feet (8,700 m^{2}) of retail space.

== History ==
Planners adapted the Town Center location to avoid protected wetland areas. The original route for the I-696 freeway placed it along 10 1/2 Mile Road southeast of 11 Mile and Greenfield Roads. Recognizing the value of a large office complex and its tax revenue, city planners built a new city hall complex near 10 1/2 Mile Road on the east side of Evergreen.

Highway planners re-routed the freeway to run along 11 Mile Road. This delayed construction, but freed up the land to build the first phase, then called the Prudential Town Center (Prudential Life Insurance Company played a major role) with the first skyscraper, 3000 Town Center completed in 1975. A six-lane freeway ramp nearby remained half-completed for about 10 years in order to modify the route to accommodate the massive Town Center project. Additional towers were constructed in 1979, 1983, 1986, 1987, and 1989.

== Location ==
The Southfield Town Center is located diagonally across Evergreen Road and Civic Center Drive (10 1/2 Mile Road) from the complex that houses the Southfield City Hall, government offices, courthouse, the contemporary Southfield Public Library, a 9-hole public golf course, a city park and dedicated sports areas, a nature trail, an historic farm property, and an indoor ice rink / Olympic-size swimming pool and recreation center. Lawrence Technological University is directly across M-10 (Lodge Freeway) from the center.

A variety of contemporary, high-rise office buildings surround the immediate area. Multiple connecting freeways in the vicinity facilitate its central access to the metro region. The property, which abuts M-10, is 1/2 mile (0.80 km) from I-696, and it is near M-39 (Southfield Freeway), I-275, I-75 (Chrysler Freeway), M-1 (Woodward Avenue) and US Highway 24 (Telegraph Road). Residential high-rises and varieties of mid-density housing are within walking distance. The surrounding Southfield area contains single-family homes, many with brick ranch style architecture.

== Architecture ==
The complex is an interconnected cluster of skyscrapers with an ornamental golden glass exterior, each with a different geometric configuration forming a Modern architectural style with Postmodern influences. The Modern styled buildings contain distinctive elements of High-Tech architecture. The complex contains fine restaurants and gift shops which support its function as a major conference center. Inside, the Westin hotel opens to a large enclosed garden atrium area which connects the Town Center buildings and is available for catering and large events.

=== Technical details ===
Name	Images	Height feet / m	Floors	Year	Area sq feet / m^{2}	Notes
3000 Town Center		402 / 122	32	1975	533,982 / 49,609	The 3000 Town Center is the second tallest building in the state of Michigan outside Detroit. Architects Neuhaus & Taylor, 3D International designed the tower using the Modern architectural style. The design exhibits strong cross braces over its golden glass and steel. It was the first phase of the Town Center.
1000 Town Center		395 / 120	28	1989	598,232 / 55,578	The 1000 Town Center was designed with a Modern architectural style using golden glass. Sikes Jennings Kelly & Brewer served as the architects. The tower was the Michigan regional headquarters of Fifth Third Bank, until 2014. The top of the building used to have a decorative Cylinder, which was covered up when Fifth Third Bank bought the building.
2000 Town Center		370 / 113	28	1986	556,723 / 51,721	The 2000 Town Center contains the Skyline Club, an upscale business club and restaurant, located on the top floor (28). The golden glass tower is a polygonal with the top third of one corner truncated in a step-back pattern, designed with a Modern architectural style. Sikes Jennings Kelly & Brewer served as the architects. The Consulate of Macedonia in Detroit is in Suite 1130 at 2000 Town Center. Previously Northwest Airlines had an office in Suite 240 of 2000 Town Center.
5000 Town Center		328 / 100	33	1983	NA	The 5000 Town Center is a high rise residential tower and reflects a Modern architectural style. It has an undulating plan, somewhat like a figure-eight. When it was built, this tower was divided into 216 individual units. Due to the merging of some units, it now has 204 residences. Solomon Cordwell Buenz & Associates served as the architects.
4000 Town Center		270 / 82	20	1979	386,293 / 35,888	The 4000 Town Center is a 20-story tower and is the shortest of the Town Center office buildings. It was built in the Modern architectural style, showing a heavy use of golden glass on its exterior. Neuhaus & Taylor, 3D International served as the architects. Includes a Sundry Shop of Friends on the Go as well as a cafeteria of Friends Café on the first floor.
1500 Town Center			12	1987	NA	The Westin Southfield Detroit Hotel interconnects with the office complex. The golden glass high-rise has 385 units/rooms and hosts conferences for up to 1,000 attendees. Sikes Jennings Kelly & Brewer designed the hotel in the Modern architectural style. Opened on October 15, 1987, as the Radisson Plaza Hotel.
Atrium garden			2	1979	94,000 / 8,733	The atrium complex connects the complex and contains retail shops with the Westin's Tango restaurant at the other end of the grand hallway.
Southfield Town Center		402 / 122			2,200,000 / 204,400	The total area excludes residential Tower 5000. The facility serves as a major conference center hosting up to 1,000 attendees. 601w owns the Town Center complex.

== See also ==
- American Center
- Architecture of metropolitan Detroit
- List of tallest buildings in Detroit
- List of tallest buildings in Michigan
- North Park Towers
