= 2026 US–Bangladesh Reciprocal Trade Agreement =

Bilateral trade pact (signed 2026)

Agreement between the United States of America and the People’s Republic of Bangladesh on Reciprocal Trade
- Type: Bilateral trade agreement
- Context: Reciprocal tariff reduction, trade liberalization, economic and security alignment
- Signed: 9 February 2026
- Location: Washington, D.C., United States
- Signatories: United States Trade Representative Jamieson Greer; Bangladesh Commerce Adviser Sheikh Bashir Uddin; Bangladesh National Security Adviser Khalilur Rahman
- Parties: United States; Bangladesh
- Languages: English

The United States–Bangladesh Agreement on Reciprocal Trade (formally the Agreement between the United States of America and the People's Republic of Bangladesh on Reciprocal Trade) is a bilateral trade pact signed on 9 February 2026 in Washington, D.C. The agreement was negotiated by the interim government led by Chief Adviser Muhammad Yunus and entered into force shortly before the 12 February 2026 Bangladeshi general election. It establishes a framework for reciprocal tariff reductions, market access for thousands of products, and binding commitments from Bangladesh in areas such as defence procurement, energy imports, digital trade, labour rights, intellectual property, and alignment with U.S. national security policies.

== Background ==
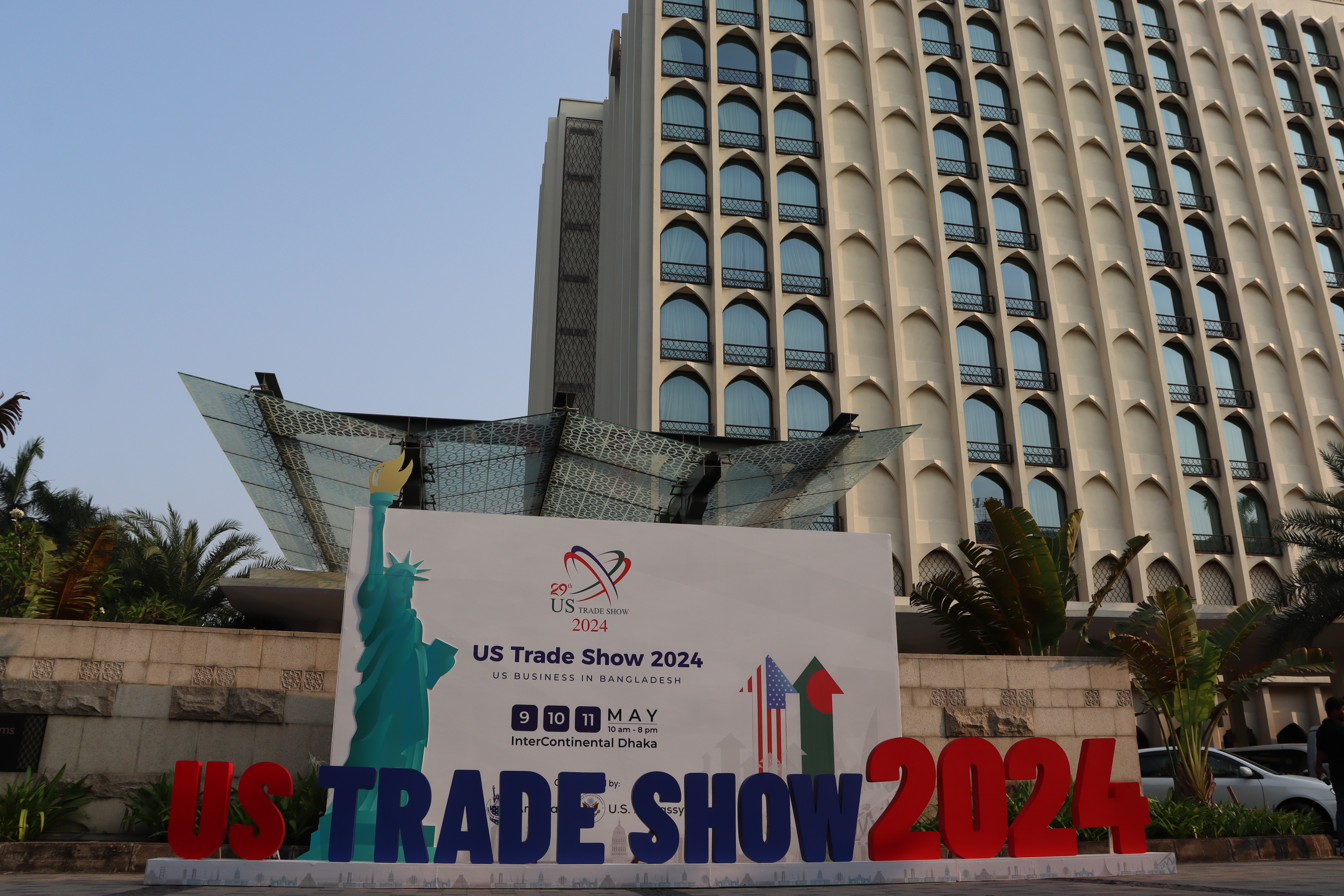
The US Trade Show 2024 was held at the InterContinental Dhaka, highlighting the growing commercial ties between the two countries.

Bilateral trade between the United States and Bangladesh had been governed by the U.S.–Bangladesh Trade and Investment Cooperation Forum Agreement (TICFA), signed in 2013. In April 2025, U.S. President Donald Trump issued Executive Order 14257, imposing a 20% reciprocal tariff on imports from Bangladesh. A subsequent executive order, 14346, created a mechanism for reducing tariffs for “aligned partners”.

Negotiations for a comprehensive reciprocal trade agreement accelerated in early 2026. On 9 January 2026, Bangladesh's National Security Adviser Khalilur Rahman met with U.S. Trade Representative Jamieson Greer in Washington, D.C., to finalise outstanding issues.

== Key provisions ==
=== Tariffs ===
Bangladesh committed to provide preferential market access for a wide range of U.S. industrial and agricultural goods, including chemicals, medical devices, machinery, motor vehicles and parts, ICT equipment, energy products, soy products, dairy products, beef, poultry, tree nuts and fruit. The United States reduced its reciprocal tariff on Bangladeshi goods from 20% to 19% and agreed to grant zero‑duty access to certain products listed in Annex III of Executive Order 14346. A mechanism was established to allow a specified volume of textile and apparel imports from Bangladesh to enter the U.S. at a zero tariff, provided that the imports incorporate U.S.‑produced cotton or man‑made fibres.

=== Non‑tariff barriers ===
Bangladesh agreed to eliminate or reduce numerous non‑tariff barriers affecting U.S. exports. It committed to accept vehicles built to U.S. Federal motor vehicle safety and emissions standards, accept U.S. Food and Drug Administration certificates and prior marketing authorisations for medical devices and pharmaceuticals, and remove import restrictions on U.S. remanufactured goods and parts. For agricultural goods, Bangladesh agreed to accept certificates issued by U.S. regulatory authorities and recognise U.S. sanitary and phytosanitary measures.

=== Digital trade ===
Bangladesh committed to permit the free transfer of data across trusted borders, support a permanent WTO moratorium on customs duties on electronic transmissions, digitalise customs procedures, and adopt good regulatory practices. It also agreed to avoid discriminatory taxes on U.S. digital services and cooperate on cybersecurity.

=== Labour and environment ===
Bangladesh agreed to protect internationally recognised labour rights, including prohibiting imports of goods produced by forced or compulsory labour, amending labour laws to fully protect freedom of association and collective bargaining (including in export processing zones), resolving criminal cases against workers for union activities, adopting a minimum wage review mechanism, and strengthening labour law enforcement. Bangladesh further committed to adopt and maintain high levels of environmental protection, enforce its environmental laws, combat illegal wildlife trade, enforce sustainable fishing practices, and implement the WTO Fisheries Subsidies Agreement.

== Intellectual property and geographical indications ==
Bangladesh agreed to a robust standard for intellectual property protection and enforcement, including ratifying or acceding to key international IP treaties. It also made groundbreaking provisions on geographical indications, preserving U.S. market access for cheese and meat producers using common names and ensuring that market access would not be restricted due to the mere use of certain cheese and meat terms.

== Defence procurement and national security alignment ==
Under Article 4 of the agreement, Bangladesh “shall endeavour to increase purchases of US military equipment” while limiting military procurement from “certain countries” – a clause widely interpreted as targeting China. The agreement also obligates Bangladesh, if the U.S. implements border measures or trade actions to protect its national security, to adopt “complementary restrictive measures” following consultations, effectively aligning Dhaka with U.S. sanctions and trade policies. Furthermore, Bangladesh is prohibited from purchasing nuclear reactors, fuel rods, or enriched uranium from any country that “jeopardises essential US interests”, a clause that blocks future nuclear cooperation with Russia or China. If Bangladesh enters a free trade or preferential agreement with a “non‑market country” (a U.S. regulatory term applied to China and Russia), the U.S. may terminate the entire deal and reimpose punitive tariffs.

== Related agreements ==
The Reciprocal Trade Agreement was followed by several ancillary deals that gave effect to its commercial commitments:

=== Boeing aircraft purchase ===
On 30 April 2026, Biman Bangladesh Airlines signed a $3.7 billion deal with Boeing to acquire 14 aircraft: eight 787‑10 Dreamliners, two 787‑9 Dreamliners, and four 737‑8 MAX jets – the airline's largest‑ever order. The deal was seen as a shift away from European rival Airbus amid trade pressure from the United States.

=== Energy cooperation MoU ===
In May 2026, Bangladesh signed a Memorandum of Understanding on Energy Cooperation with the United States, establishing a framework for expanded cooperation on energy infrastructure, fuel diversification, and supply chain sustainability. The MoU was expected to facilitate Bangladesh's import of U.S. LNG, LPG, and other energy products at competitive prices, supporting the $15 billion, 15‑year energy purchase commitment made in the Reciprocal Trade Agreement.

=== Defence foundational agreements ===
Throughout 2026, Bangladesh and the United States negotiated a suite of foundational defence agreements, including a General Security of Military Information Agreement (GSOMIA), an Acquisition and Cross‑Servicing Agreement (ACSA), and a Communications Interoperability and Security Memorandum of Agreement (CISMOA). These agreements would allow U.S. warships and aircraft to use Bangladeshi ports and airfields for maintenance, refuelling, and resupply, including strategic hubs in Chittagong and Matarbari. The GSOMIA would permit the sharing of classified military information and intelligence on U.S. defence equipment.

== Reactions ==
=== United States ===
U.S. Trade Representative Jamieson Greer said the agreement “marks a meaningful step forward in opening markets, addressing trade barriers, and creating new opportunities for American exporters”. The White House described the deal as providing “unprecedented levels of market access in Bangladesh” and bolstering U.S. national and economic security.

=== Bangladesh ===
Commerce Adviser Sheikh Bashir Uddin hailed the agreement as “a historically new level” in bilateral economic relations. However, the deal faced widespread domestic criticism. An analysis by Bangladesh Pratidin found that the word “shall” (indicating mandatory obligations) appeared 179 times – 131 times referring to Bangladesh and only six times to the United States – leading critics to argue that the agreement placed disproportionately heavier obligations on Dhaka than on Washington. Economist Mustafizur Rahman of the Centre for Policy Dialogue called it “an imposed agreement done through the total weaponisation of trade”. Left‑leaning student organisations protested in Dhaka, demanding the agreement's cancellation and alleging it threatened national sovereignty and would harm domestic poultry, dairy, pharmaceutical, agricultural, and industrial sectors. The Revolutionary Workers Party of Bangladesh and other leftist parties called on the incoming BNP‑led government to scrap the deal, terming it “unequal” and contrary to national interests. The opposition Bangladesh Nationalist Party, which won the February 2026 election, signalled that it would review the agreement.

=== India ===
The agreement sparked a political debate in India. Opposition leader Rahul Gandhi claimed that the zero‑tariff clause for Bangladeshi textiles using U.S. raw materials would harm India's textile sector and cause Indian cotton farmers to lose a key buyer. Union Commerce Minister Piyush Goyal responded that India would secure identical tariff benefits and accused Gandhi of “spreading another lie”. Former Indian diplomat Veena Sikri expressed confidence that the agreement would not significantly harm India's interests, noting that any zero‑tariff benefits for Bangladesh would be conditional on importing American raw materials.

=== Geopolitical analysis ===
Analysts viewed the agreement as a major strategic realignment. The Daily Star noted that the deal went “far beyond standard tariff reductions”, creating “a binding framework that integrates Bangladesh’s defence, energy, trade and digital infrastructure into the US sphere of influence” and effectively ending Bangladesh's long‑standing policy of balancing between major powers. The Week described the agreement as part of a U.S. effort to reduce Bangladesh's imports from China and increase military imports from the United States, raising the possibility of a new “proxy war” ground in South Asia. An editorial in The Daily Star noted that the $3.7 billion Boeing purchase, with payments expected to extend over 20 years, was “partly a calculation of geopolitical intent” that shifted Bangladesh away from European rival Airbus and committed the country to long‑term financial obligations under the February 2026 reciprocal trade agreement.

== See also ==
- Foreign relations of Bangladesh
- Bangladesh–United States relations
- International sanctions during the Russo-Ukrainian War
- China–Bangladesh relations
