= American Center =

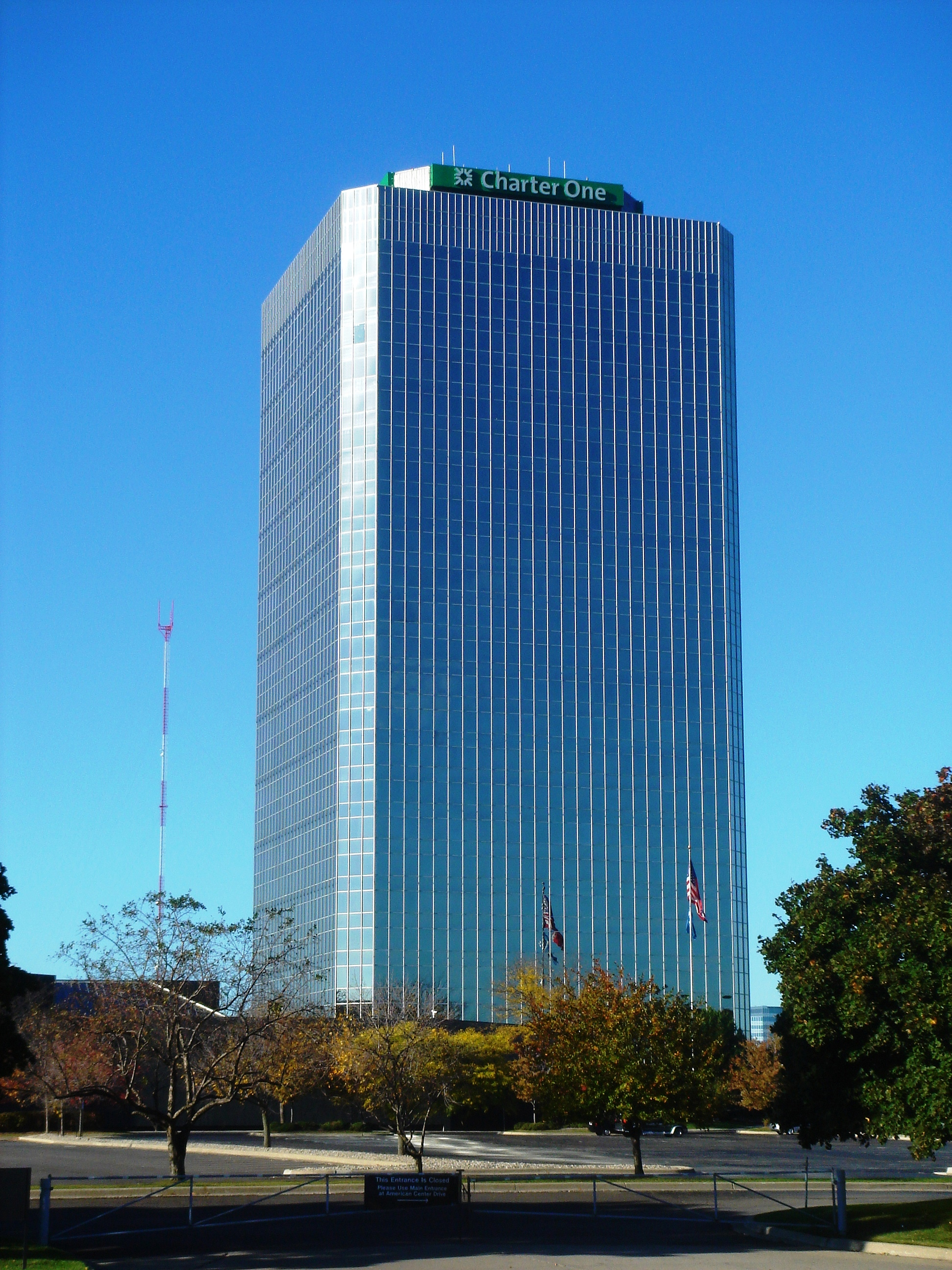
- American Center
- Interactive map of the American Center area

General information
- Type: office/retail
- Location: Southfield-Detroit, United States
- Coordinates: 42°29′24″N 83°17′56″W
- Completed: 1975 (Renovated 2001)
- Owner: REDICO

Height
- Antenna spire: 104.7 m (344 ft)
- Roof: 100.9 m (331 ft)

Technical details
- Floor count: 26
- Floor area: 500,000 sq ft (46,000 m^{2})

Design and construction
- Architect: SmithGroup

The American Center is a high-rise tower in the Metro Detroit suburb of Southfield, Michigan, built in 1975 as the corporate headquarters for the automaker American Motors Corporation (AMC), which was subsequently acquired by Chrysler Corporation in 1987. The building is located adjacent to Interstate 696, M-10, and US 24 interchange.

Upgraded in 2001, the office tower has 27 floors, including a basement, and has been owned and managed since 2017 by Redico, a Southfield-based real estate developer.

== Architecture ==
The structural system consists of s trussed steel frame. Designed as a modern architecture tower, the curtain wall facade was originally golden glass. The tower is square in plan, with chamfered corners. The elevator core is unusual in that it is rotated 45 degrees relative to the tower's axis. The building also includes a parking garage and retail spaces. It has a Leadership in Energy and Environmental Design (LEED) "Certified Silver" designation.

== Development ==
American Motors was planning in the late 1960s to move out of the Plymouth Road complex (14250 Plymouth Road) in Detroit, a facility built in the 1910s for Kelvinator. The company announced in 1973 that it would move to a new building in Southfield, the American Motors Corporation Office Building. In 1975, AMC moved its corporate offices to the glass-and-steel skyscraper in Southfield, joining the exodus of companies from Detroit.

American Motors began selling off its non-automotive holdings to focus its resources on an expensive future vehicle planning program. Thus, in October 1973, AMC became a tenant in its own headquarters. It occupied 35% of the building, but sold the building and the 94 acres (38 ha) of land for $51 million to Hall Real Estate Group in Texas and two Michigan partners: developer Martin Ross and Detroit attorney Erwin Ziegelman.

The AMC logo remained on the building, which housed AMC's executive offices and its administrative, marketing, sales, financial, and legal departments. Pictures of the office tower appeared in corporate press releases, stockholders' reports, and marketing materials, including on the cover of the 1980 sales brochure for its cars. The company continued its automotive design and engineering operations at the Plymouth Road complex in Detroit, as Chrysler did for a time after acquiring AMC.

After the acquisition, Chrysler Financial occupied ten floors of the building, 175,000 square feet (16,300 m^{2}), and the Michigan Court of Appeals occupied approximately 33,500 square feet (3,110 m^{2}).

The building was owned by Charter One Bank (which, as of 2004, was owned by Citizens Financial Group).

== See also ==
- Architecture of metropolitan Detroit
- Southfield Town Center

== Sources ==
- Fisher, Dale (2005). Southeast Michigan: Horizons of Growth. Eyry of the Eagle Publishing. ISBN 9781891143250.
- Meyer, Katherine Mattingly (1980). McElroy, Martin C.P. (ed.). Detroit Architecture: A.I.A Guide (American Institute of Architects Guide Series) (Revised ed.). Wayne State University Press. ISBN 9780814316511.
