= Bangladesh–China relations =

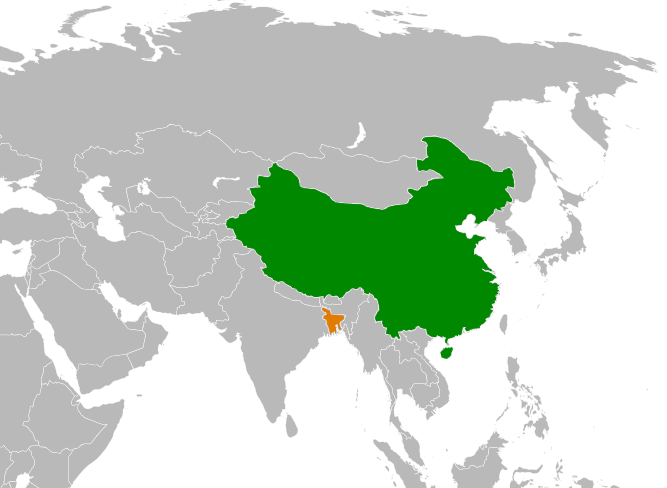

- China: Bangladesh

Diplomatic mission
- Embassy of China, Dhaka: Embassy of Bangladesh, Beijing

The People's Republic of Bangladesh and the People's Republic of China established formal diplomatic relations in January 1976. China has an embassy in Dhaka, and Bangladesh has one in Beijing with consulates in Hong Kong and Kunming. Both countries are members of the BCIM Forum (Bangladesh-China-India-Myanmar Forum for Regional Cooperation). According to Chinese government designations, Bangladesh and China are in a "comprehensive strategic cooperative partnership".

== History ==
The treasure voyages went to Sonargaon in Bangladesh

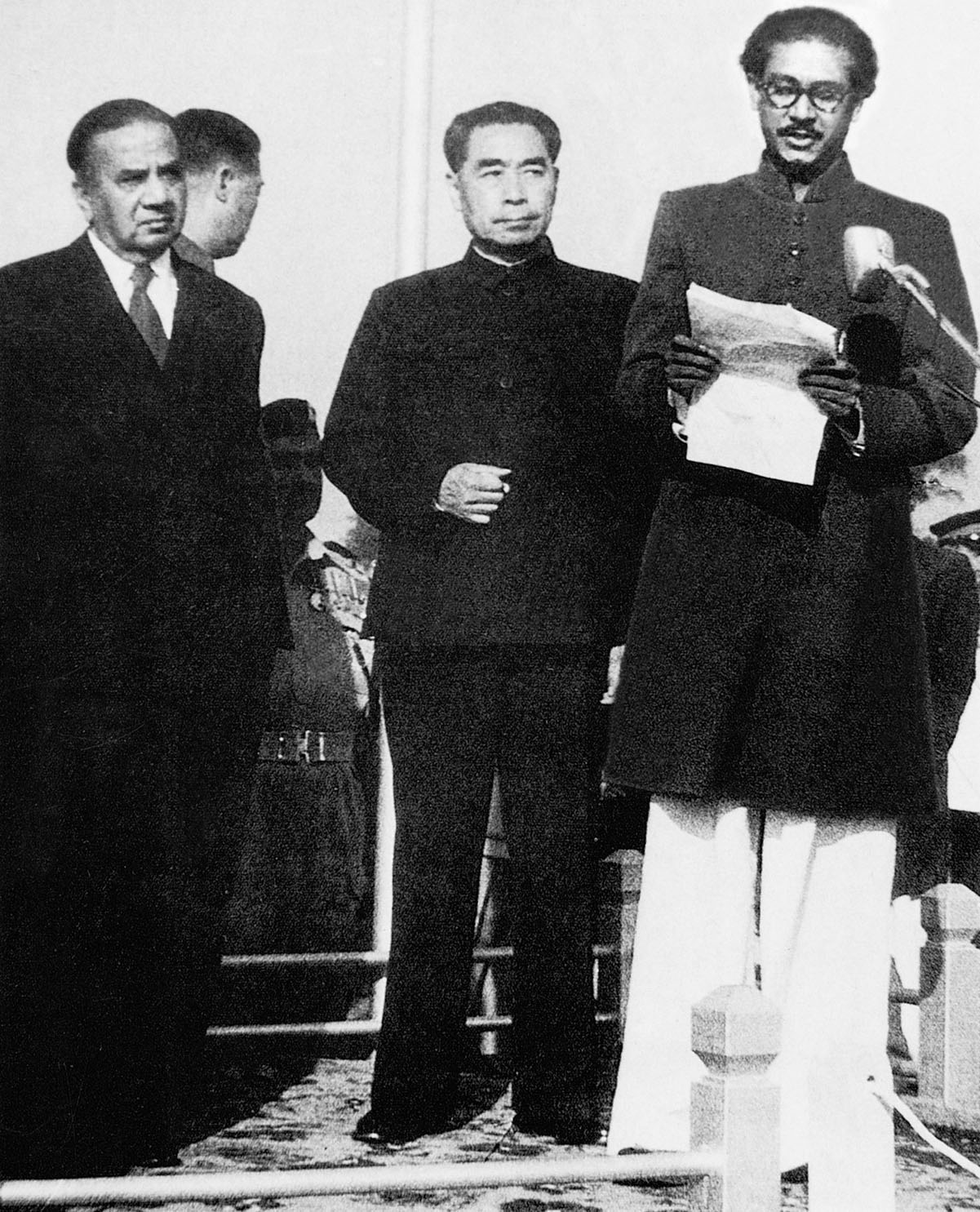
Zhou Enlai (centre) with H. S. Suhrawardy (left) and Sheikh Mujibur Rahman (right) in Dhaka Stadium, 1957

=== Bengal and Imperial China ===
Chinese monks, scholars and traders began frequenting Bengal (Tosali Province) from the Qin dynasty period. Famous ancient Chinese travelers to Bengal included Faxian, Yijing and Xuanzang. During the Pala Empire of Bengal, Atisa of Bikrampur traveled to Tibet and played an important role in developing Tibetan Buddhism.

In 648, a companion of Muhammad, Sa'd ibn Abi Waqqas, who is credited have introduced Islam in China, is said to have followed a route via the Brahmaputra. Evidence remains in Lalmonirhat of a masjid built by himself and is known locally as Abi Waqqas Masjid.

Political relations became nonexistent until the Middle Ages after the decline of Buddhism in South Asia. After the Muslim conquest of Bengal in the 13th century, general Bakhtiar Khilji attempted to invade Tibet. Khilji's army was compelled to retreat due to the harsh conditions of the Himalayas. Ming China and the Bengal Sultanate exchanged many embassies during the 15th century. Sultan Ghiyasuddin Azam Shah began sending envoys to the Ming dynasty. He sent ambassadors in 1405, 1408 and 1409. Emperor Yongle of China responded by sending ambassadors to Bengal between 1405 and 1433, including members of the Treasure voyages fleet led by Admiral Zheng He. The exchange of embassies included the gift of an East African giraffe by Sultan Shihabuddin Bayazid Shah to the Chinese emperor in 1414 after the Chinese envoys noticed Bengal's trade with Malindi. The treasure voyages led by the Chinese Muslim Admiral Zheng He visited the Bengal Sultanate at least twice. Ming China, under the Yongle Emperor, also mediated in the Bengal Sultanate-Jaunpur Sultanate War creating peace between the two countries.

Experts have also speculated on the possibility of a southwestern Silk Road connecting Bengal and China.

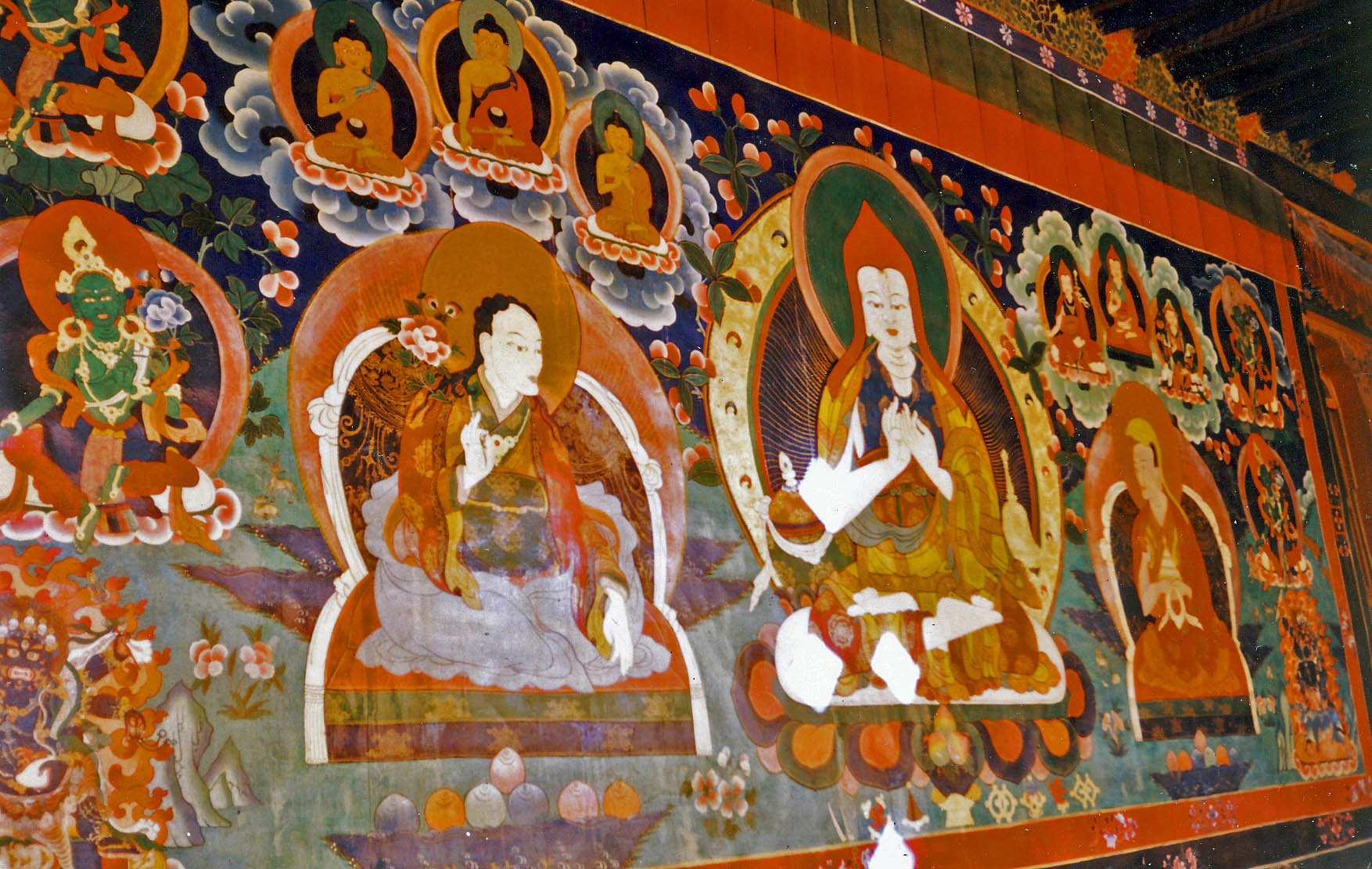
Tibetan artwork depicting Atisa who was born on the territory of Bangladesh

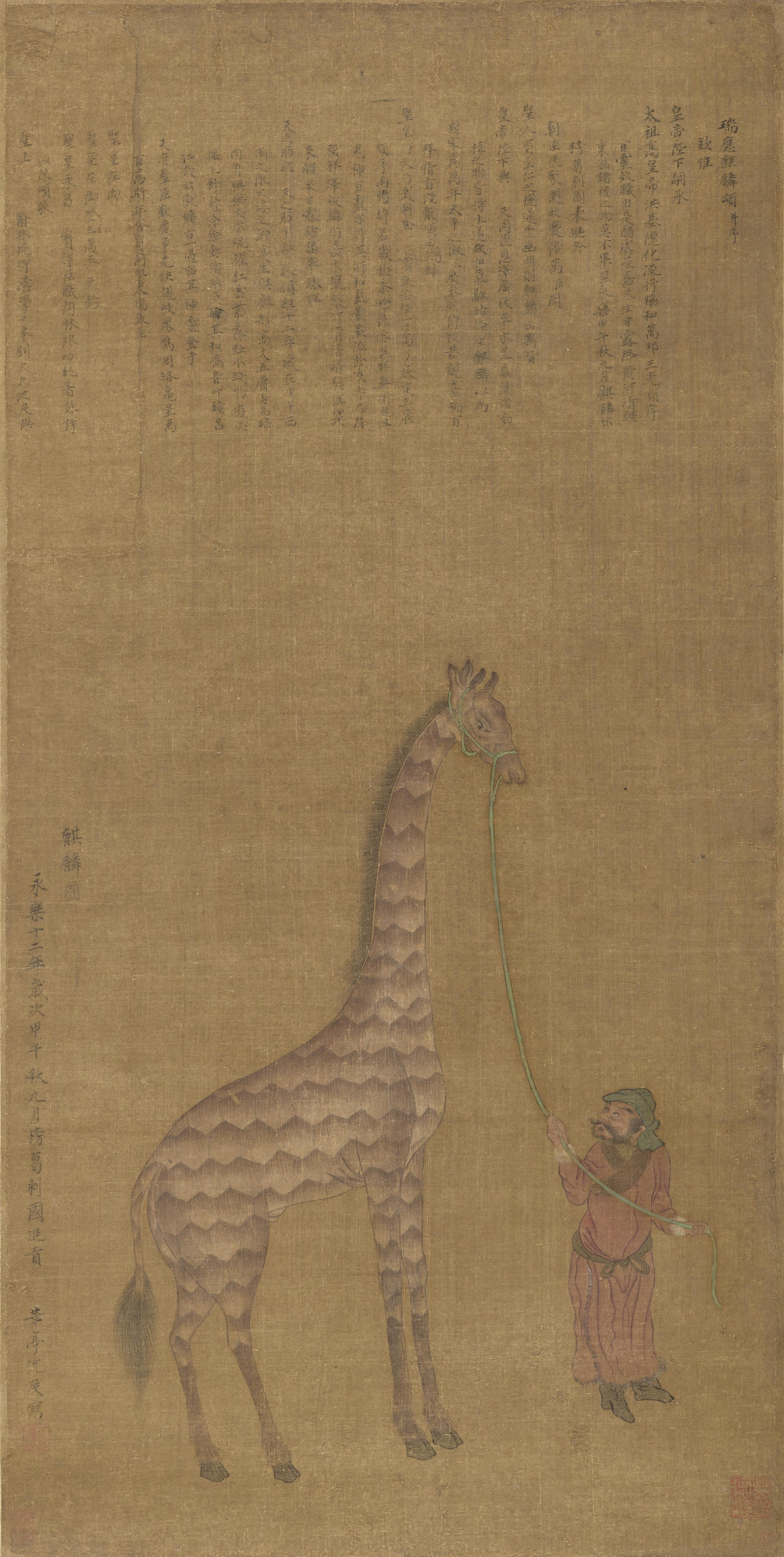
An African giraffe from the Bengali Muslim royal court was gifted to China in 1414. The Chinese saw it as a qilin.

=== East Pakistan (or Modern day Bangladesh) ===
Chinese premier Zhou Enlai visited East Pakistan several times in the 1950s and 60s. The Chinese Communist Party maintained close ties with Bengali nationalist leaders Maulana Abdul Hamid Khan Bhashani and Huseyn Shaheed Suhrawardy. Sheikh Mujib in particular, was considered close to Mao Zedong. While serving as the Prime Minister of Pakistan in 1957, Awami League president H. S. Suhrawardy became the first Pakistani leader to make a state visit to the PRC.

== Sectoral relations ==
=== Geopolitical relations ===
When the Bangladesh War of Independence broke out in 1971, complex geopolitical rivalries erupted in South Asia. The Bangladeshis elicited the help of India in their freedom struggle. China had earlier fought a war with India in 1962 and became an ally of Pakistan. Crucially, it was using Pakistan as a conduit for rapprochement with Richard Nixon and Henry Kissinger in the United States. The PRC also replaced Taiwan (Republic of China) as a permanent member of UN Security Council in 1971. Its first veto was used to support Pakistan during the Indo-Pakistani War of 1971. In the early years of Bangladesh's independence, Dhaka was also close to the Soviet Union, which was a rival of China following the Sino-Soviet split. Despite the support of most countries in the world, Bangladesh's UN membership was vetoed by China until 1974. The situation dramatically changed after military coups in Bangladesh began in 1975, causing Bangladesh to distance itself from the Indo-Soviet Cold War axis in South Asia. China and Bangladesh established diplomatic relations in January 1976. The period coincided with the recognition of the PRC as the sole legitimate government of China by most of the world. The period also saw the Chinese begin to embrace market socialism. President Ziaur Rahman, who restored free markets in Bangladesh, visited Beijing and the laid the groundwork for the relationship; while numerous Chinese leaders visited Dhaka in the late 1970s.

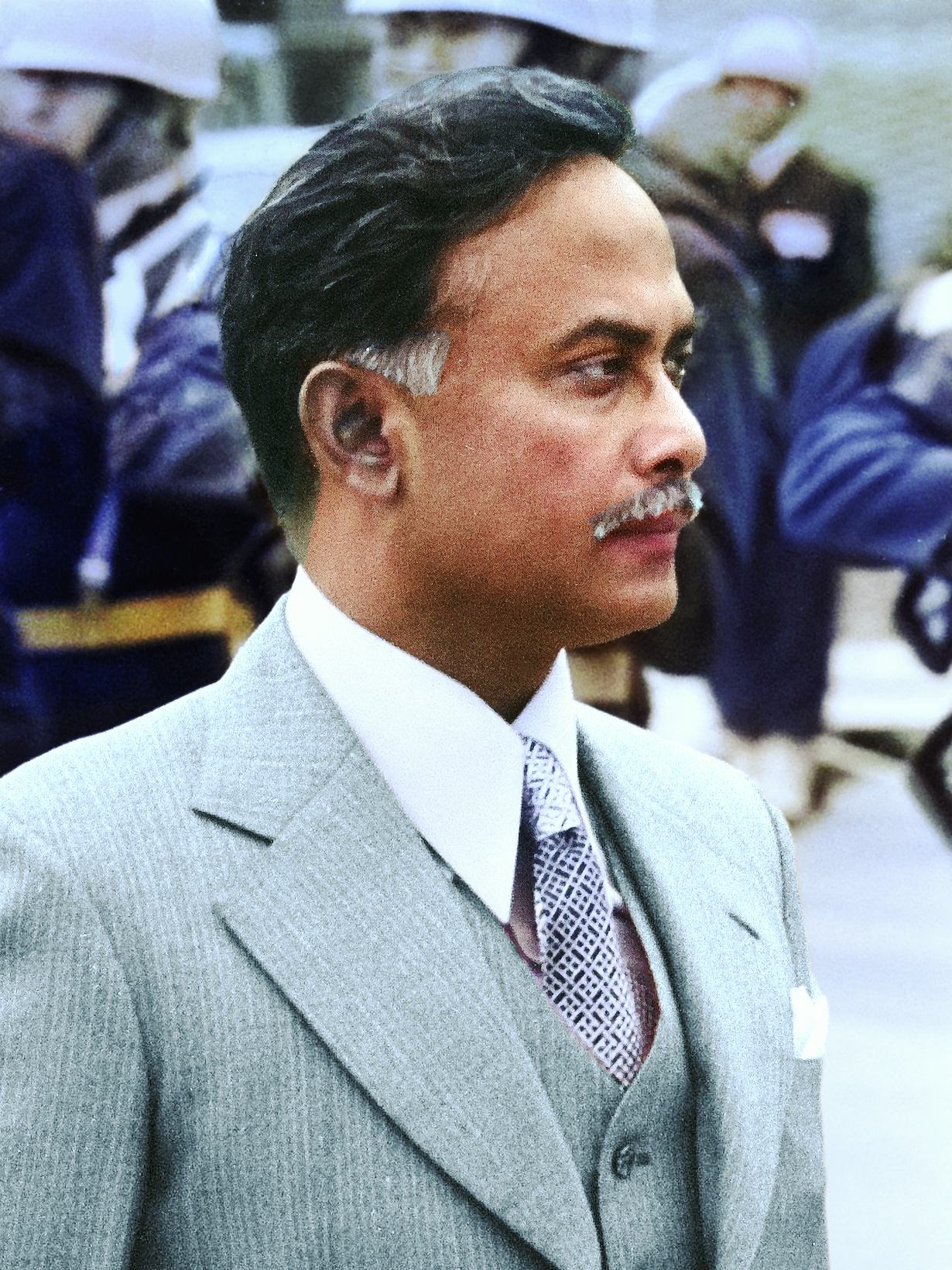
Ziaur Rahman was a key architect of modern Bangladesh-China relations

By the mid-1980s, China had forged close military, commercial and cultural ties with Bangladesh and also supplied it with military aid and equipment. The then-president of Bangladesh Hossain Mohammad Ershad was warmly received in Beijing in July 1987. A Bangladesh-China friendship bridge was constructed and inaugurated over river Buriganga connecting Dhaka and Munshiganj by the Chinese as a token of this newly advancing diplomatic and military relationship. On 4 October 2000, the Government of Bangladesh issued a postal stamp marking the 25th anniversary of the establishment of Bangladesh-China diplomatic relations. By this time, China had provided economic assistance totaling US$300 million to Bangladesh and the bilateral trade had reached a value mounting to a billion dollars. In 2002, Chinese Premier Wen Jiabao made an official visit to Bangladesh and both countries declared 2005 as the "Bangladesh-China Friendship Year."

The two countries signed nine different bilateral agreements to further their mutual relationship.

On Bangladesh Nationalist Party PM Begum Khaleda Zia's invitation China was added as an observer in the South Asian Association for Regional Cooperation (SAARC). Sri Lanka, Maldives, Nepal, and Pakistan joined Bangladesh in strongly supporting China's application for observer status, which was accepted.

After Cyclone Sidr hit Bangladesh in 2007, China donated US$1 million for relief and reconstruction in cyclone-hit areas.

Bangladesh's relationship with China has deepened under the interim government of Muhammad Yunus and the Bangladesh Nationalist Party prime minister Tarique Rahman, following the ouster of Prime Minister Sheikh Hasina in 2024. From 2024 to 2026, the two countries have signed at least 15 new memorandums of understanding and agreements.

==== Tibet ====
The Chinese embassy in Bangladesh has twice intervened during local art shows to censor coverage of the plight of Tibetan refugees in South Asia. In 2009, police canceled a planned photo exhibit on Tibetan exiles at the Drik gallery in Dhaka, after requests from the Chinese embassy. In 2016, the Chinese ambassador protested against Tibetan exhibits at the Dhaka Art Summit, which led the organizers to censor coverage of Tibet.

==== Uyghurs ====
In July 2019, UN ambassadors of 37 countries, including Bangladesh, signed a joint letter to the United Nations Human Rights Council defending China's persecution of Uyghurs. Bangladesh was one of 16 countries that defended China in 2019 but did not do so in 2020.

=== Economic relations ===
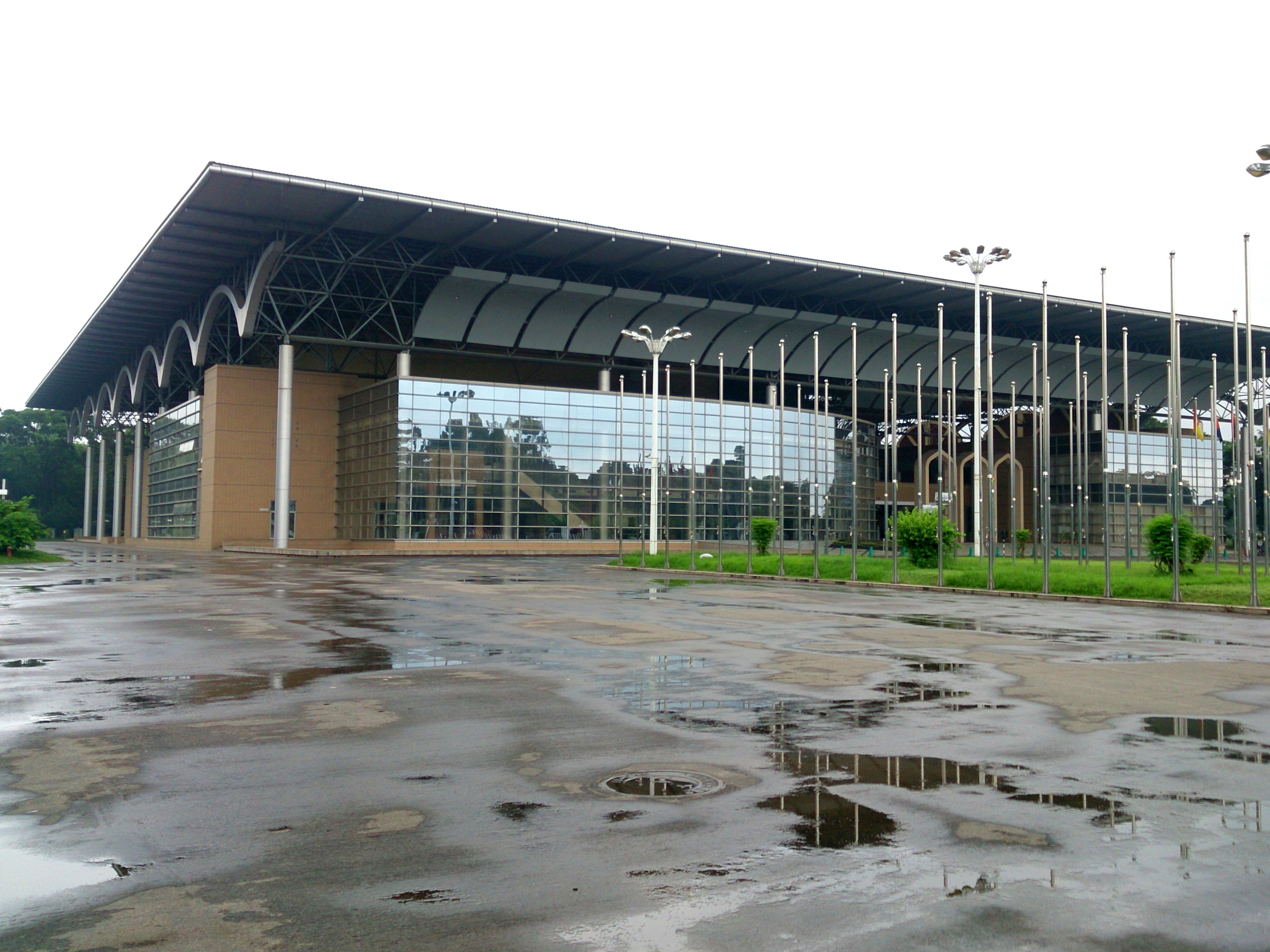
The Bangabandhu International Conference Center in Dhaka was built with Chinese assistance

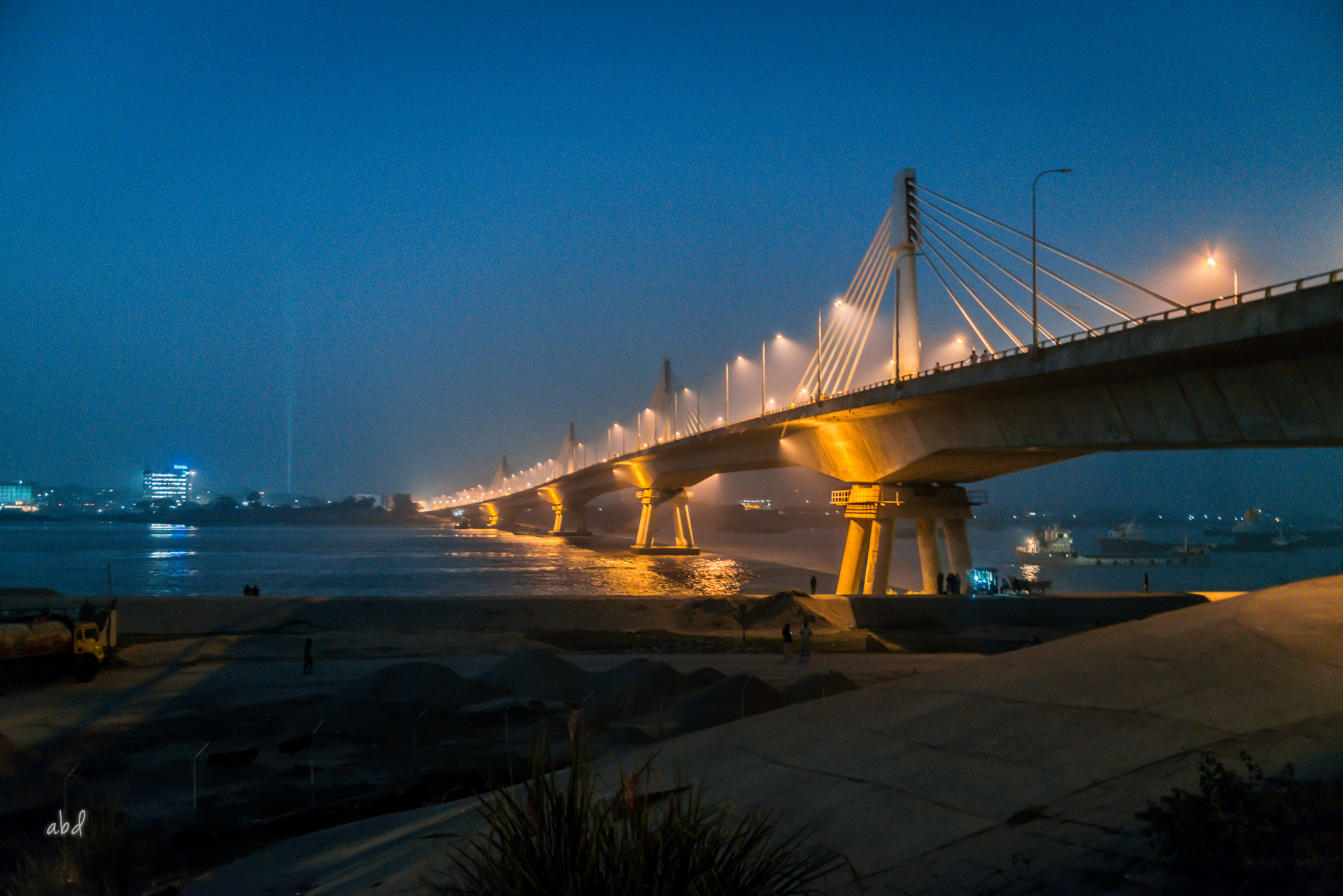
Shah Amanat Bridge in Chittagong is one of many funded by Chinese development assistance in Bangladesh

As a part of a strengthened bilateral trade and investment relationship, China has given Duty-Free (DF) access to 97 percent of Bangladeshi products which came into force from 1 July 2020. According to the notice of the Tariff Commission of the State Council of China on 16 June 2020, zero-tariff has been applied to 8,256 products originating from Bangladesh among the total 8,549 products recognized in the Chinese tariff-line. Utilizing this Duty Free (DF) facility, Bangladesh can seize greater market share as this DF Facility covers Bangladesh-originating 132 knitwear items and 117 woven items at HS Code- 8 Digit Level, at which segment of items, Bangladesh is already highly competitive exporting to China. Bangladesh-China bilateral trade is highly tilted in favour of Beijing, and Bangladesh's bilateral trade deficit with China has increased 1600% in last 20 years (c. 2019). 25% of Bangladesh's total imports are from China, in 2018-19 China's export to Bangladesh was US$13.6 billion whereas Bangladesh's export to China was only $0.56 billion. China has given several loans to Bangladesh, which compared to India [with which Bangladesh shares land border on 3 sides] are on less favorable terms, and could lead Bangladesh into debt-trap. China has also offered to construct nuclear power plants in Bangladesh to help meet the country's growing energy needs, while also seeking to aid the development of Bangladesh's natural gas resources. China's mainly imports raw materials from Bangladesh like leather, cotton textiles, fish, etc. China's major exports to Bangladesh include textiles, machinery and electronic products, cement, fertiliser, tyre, raw silk, maize, etc.

In 2005, Chinese premier Wen Jiabao visited Bangladesh on an official visit on 7 and 8 April. Various agreements were signed during this visit. On transportation side, China and Bangladesh have agreed to start a direct air transport route between Dhaka and Beijing via Kunming. Also Kunming-Chittagong road link through Myanmar is also considered. The Chinese premier readily agreed to constructing the Di-Aluminium Phosphate (DAP) fertiliser factory in Chittagong entirely on concessional lending instead of on supplier's credit. In 2007, Chinese Assistant Minister of Commerce, Wang Chao visited Bangladesh with the 39-member purchase delegation. It is the biggest purchase delegation ever to Bangladesh with over 10 companies listed in China's top 500 and some of them in world's top 500. Delegation is reported to have purchased Bangladeshi goods worth over US$50 million. Both countries accepted to build a "Bangladesh-China Friendship Exhibition Center" in Dhaka. the amount of foreign trade between Bangladesh and China is about 10 billion dollars. Bangladesh import about 8 billion dollars of goods from China while it exports 2 billion dollars of goods. However, China has recently waived tariffs of 97% Bangladesh's products. This will reduce the trade deficit between Bangladesh and China.

In October 2016, Bangladesh became a participant in Belt and Road Initiative (BRI) while both countries elevated their relationship to Strategic Partnership of Cooperation. Most of the BRI projects in Bangladesh are related to transport and energy infrastructure. As of 2023, out of the $40 billion in investments promised by China, only $4.45 billion was disbursed according to the then Chinese Ambassador to Bangladesh Yao Wen. As of 2026, the projects were numbered around 40 although the exact number remained unknown due to lack of official data. Many of the BRI projects were eventually cancelled. The Sonadia Deep Sea Port project was cancelled in August 2020 over environmental concerns and a strong opposition from the United States, Japan, and India. In 2021, China informed Bangladesh that it would no longer undertake projects involving high pollution and high energy consumption. In the same year, Bangladesh had to shelve 6 BRI projects including Payra deep seaport.

Effective 1 December 2024, China eliminated tariffs for goods imported from all of the countries that the United Nations categorizes as least developed and with which China has diplomatic relations, including Bangladesh.

In 2016, the Chinese Economic and Industrial Zone (CEIZ) in Anwara, Chattogram, was launched during Chinese President Xi Jinping's visit to Dhaka. Despite its potential, the project faced prolonged delays of over nine years due to disagreements with the initial Chinese developer, slow approvals, and extended planning procedures, preventing significant progress until recent years.

In May 2026, Bangladesh Foreign Minister Khalilur Rahman visited Beijing to talk with Chinese Foreign Minister Wang Yi, focusing on trade development, regional security and mutual cooperation. They also discussed about infrastructure project, Belt and Road cooperation, energy financing. During Prime Minister Tarique Rahman’s visit to China in June 2026, 11 Chinese companies proposed investments totaling US$9.21 billion in Bangladesh.

=== Defence cooperation ===
Defence cooperation between China and Bangladesh began after China recognized Bangladesh in 1975. China has provided military personnel training and military hardware, emerging over the years as the number one provider of such material to Bangladesh. The Bangladesh Army has been equipped with Chinese tanks, its navy has Chinese frigates and missile boats and the Bangladesh Air Force flies Chinese fighter jets. In 2002, China and Bangladesh signed a "Defence Cooperation Agreement" which covers military training and defence production. In 2006, a Chinese report to the United Nations revealed that Dhaka is emerging as a major buyer of Chinese-made weapons. China sold 65 large calibre artillery systems, 16 combat aircraft and 114 missile and related equipment to Bangladesh in 2006. Bangladesh also bought roughly 200 small arms and regular artillery pieces from China.

In 2008, Bangladesh set up an anti-ship missile launch pad near the Chittagong Port with assistance from China. The maiden missile test was performed on 12 May 2008 with active participation of Chinese experts. It successfully test-fired anti-ship missile C-802A with a strike range of 120 km from the frigate BNS Osman near Kutubdia Island in the Bay of Bengal. BNS Osman, which was commissioned in 1989, is a 1500-ton Chinese built Jianghu class frigate, and the C-802A missile is a modified version of Chinese Ying Ji-802 with weight reduced from 815 kg to 715 kg to increase the strike range from 42 km to 120 km.

In 2026, Bangladesh received various VT5 tanks from China, which is believed to be the first of a second army order for the Chinese light tank. In August 2026, Bangladesh finalized a deal to buy 20 to 24 Chinese J-10CE fighters valued at up to US$2.3 billion.

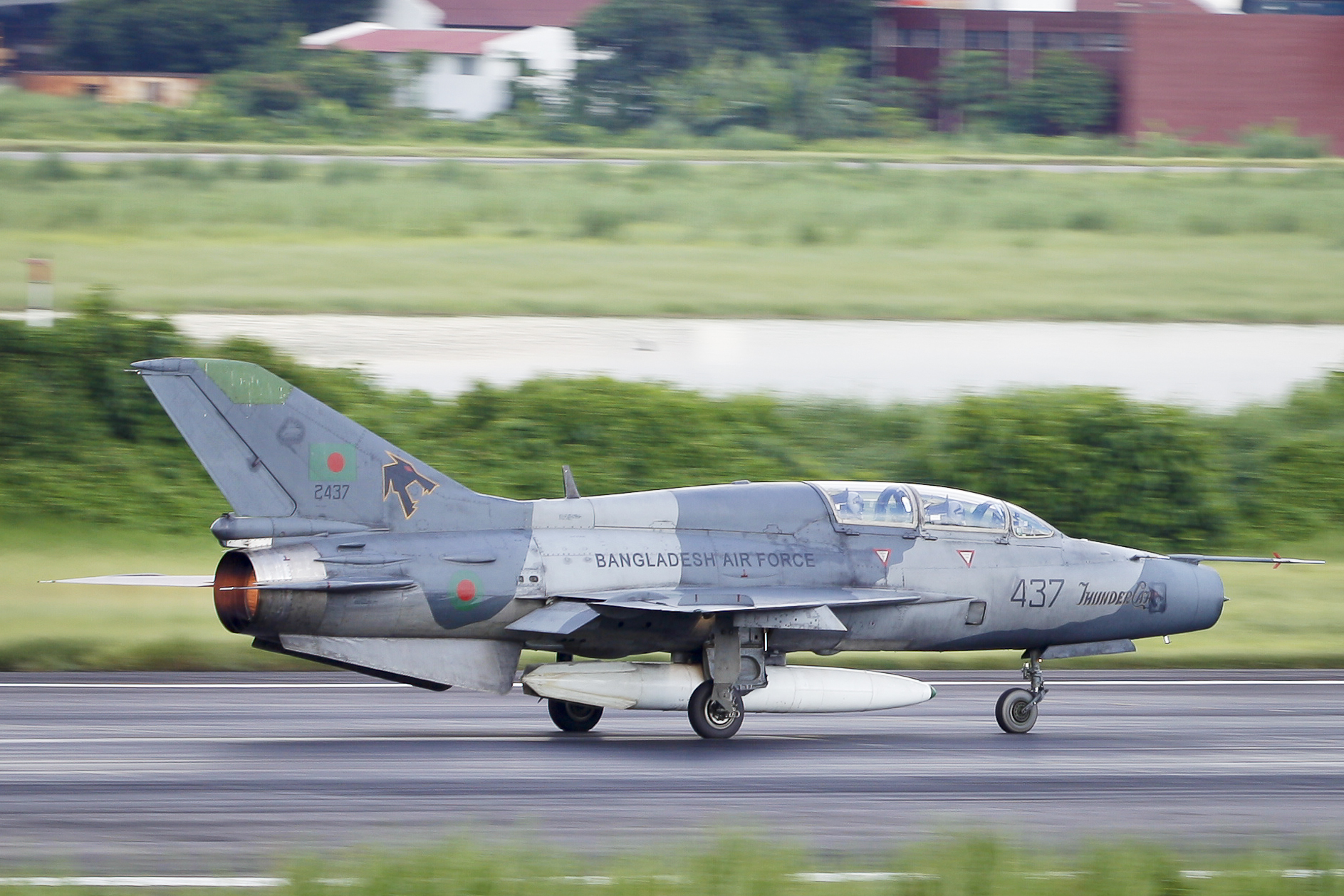
A Bangladesh Air Force Chengdu J-7

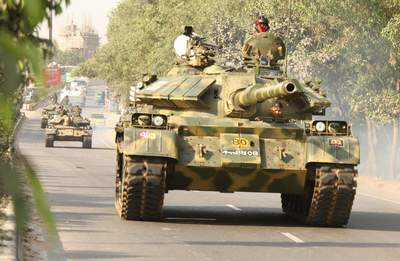
Chinese Type 69 tanks of the Bangladesh Army

=== Water security: River water sharing ===
Bangladesh and India have signaled concerns over Chinese plans to dam and divert water from the Brahmaputra River in Tibet.

Bangladesh has expressed concern particularly over China's Medog Hydropower Station Project due to its potential impact on downstream water flow, particularly on the Jamuna River, which is fed by the Brahmaputra. In February 2025, Bangladeshi officials formally requested more information from Beijing, citing worries about reduced water availability, ecological disruptions, and the lack of transparency in the dam's planning. The project's scale and potential to alter river flow have heightened fears of adverse effects on agriculture, fisheries, and livelihoods in Bangladesh's flood-prone regions.

Although China claims the project is a run-of-the-river hydropower initiative that will not affect downstream flow, Bangladesh has requested technical transparency and access to hydrological data to independently assess potential impacts. Malik Fida Khan, executive director of the Center for Environmental and Geographic Information Services, highlighted that 70 percent of the dry-season flow in the Ganges-Brahmaputra-Meghna basin comes via the Brahmaputra, warning that any disruption upstream could critically affect Bangladesh's already climate-stressed water resources. Sharif Jamil, an environmental activist and coordinator of Riverkeeper Bangladesh, described the dam as "unilateral and geographically sensitive," emphasizing that the lack of transparent consultation could lead to ecological, hydrological, and socio-economic consequences.

=== Covid-19 pandemic ===
In August 2020, Bangladesh approved the final stage testing of the Chinese pharmaceutical firm Sinovac Biotech Ltd's COVID-19 vaccine. On 4 October 2020, it was reported that Sinovac had sought Bangladesh's co-financing of the trials. However, on 13 October 2020, the trials were reported to be uncertain after Bangladesh refused to co-fund the vaccine, saying that at the time of seeking approval, Sinovac had said they would run the trials on their own funds and had also promised to provide 100,000 free doses.

== Diaspora ==
There is a sizeable Chinese diaspora in the Bangladeshi capital, Dhaka; first arriving in the 1940s and a smaller population in Chittagong. Their presence is seen as a result of the First World War. Many tend to work as shoemakers or are involved in the opium trade, while others have opened up many Chinese restaurants across the country with its own Bangladeshi twist. Many popular beauty parlours are also run by Chinese Bangladeshis. Areas densely populated with Chinese people in Dhaka include Imamganj and Mitford.

== Public opinion ==
A survey published in 2026 by the Pew Research Center found that 56% of Bangladeshis had a favorable view of China, while 33% had an unfavorable view.

== See also ==
- Chinese people in Bangladesh

== Bibliography ==
- Cardenal, Juan Pablo; Araújo, Heriberto (2011). La silenciosa conquista china (in Spanish). Barcelona: Crítica. p. 257. ISBN 9788498922578.
