= GSOMIA =

Military treaty between Japan and South Korea

Agreement between the Government of the Republic of Korea and the Government of Japan on the Protection of Classified Military Information
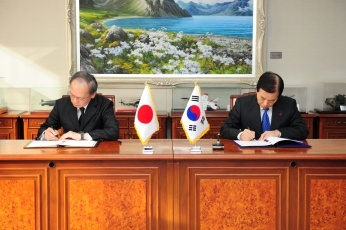
- Signing ceremony of Japan-South Korea GSOMIA in Seoul
- Type: Military treaty
- Signed: 23 November 2016
- Location: Seoul, South Korea
- Effective: 23 November 2016
- Signatories: (Japan) Yasumasa Nagamine; (South Korea) Han Min-goo
- Parties: Japan; ROK
- Languages: English

Full text
- Japan-Korea GSOMIA at Wikisource

GSOMIA is an acronym for 'General Security of Military Information Agreement', mainly known for a bilateral military treaty for exchange of military information between Japan and South Korea.

== History ==
The agreement was signed on 23 November 2016 at Seoul, South Korea.

GSOMIA was involved in 2019 by South Korean president Moon Jae-in as part of Japan–South Korea trade dispute, yet retained by pressure from Trump administration of the United States. The treaty came back in force by South Korean president Yoon Suk Yeol later in year 2023.
