= Acquisition and Cross-Servicing Agreement =

For exchange of military support between US and NATO allies

An Acquisition and Cross-Servicing Agreement (ACSA) are negotiated on a bilateral basis between the United States and its NATO allies or coalition partners that allow US forces to exchange most common types of support, including food, fuel, transportation, ammunition, and equipment. The agreement does not, in any way commit a country to any military action. ACSAs also exist between third-party countries. Both Japan and South Korea have formed ACSAs with countries other than the US.

As of February 2020, the US had ACSAs with 120 countries, with several additional countries that are eligible for ACSAs, including most NATO nations, as well as the NATO Support and Procurement Agency (NSPA), NATO Allied Command Transformation, and Supreme Headquarters Allied Powers Europe (SHAPE). ACSAs diminish logistics burdens and are considered vital logistics enablers by providing on site commanders increased interoperability, enhanced operational readiness and cost effective joint support. The ACSA accomplishes this by establishing a mechanism to provide logistical supplies between two parties in exchange for reimbursement either in cash, replacement in kind, or equal value exchange.

== History ==
The Acquisition and Cross Servicing Agreement (ACSA) statute (formerly known as "NATO Mutual Support Act") was enacted to simplify exchanges of logistic support, supplies, and services between the United States and other NATO forces. It was subsequently amended in 1987, to permit ACSAs with the governments of eligible non-NATO countries, with further amendments in 1989 and 1990. It also requires equal-value exchanges (EVEs) of logistic support, supplies, and services and allows ACSAs with United Nations organizations and to authorize the loan or lease of equipment. Annual reports are required listing all ACSA transactions in the previous fiscal year and projecting requirements for the next fiscal year.

The ACSA authorities provide the combatant commanders and the Service component or sub-unified commands the means to acquire and provide mutual logistic support during training and expulsion, exercises and military operations, or to permit expedited access to the logistics assets of foreign country armed forces to satisfy the logistics support requirements of deployed US Armed Forces.

=== Japan ===
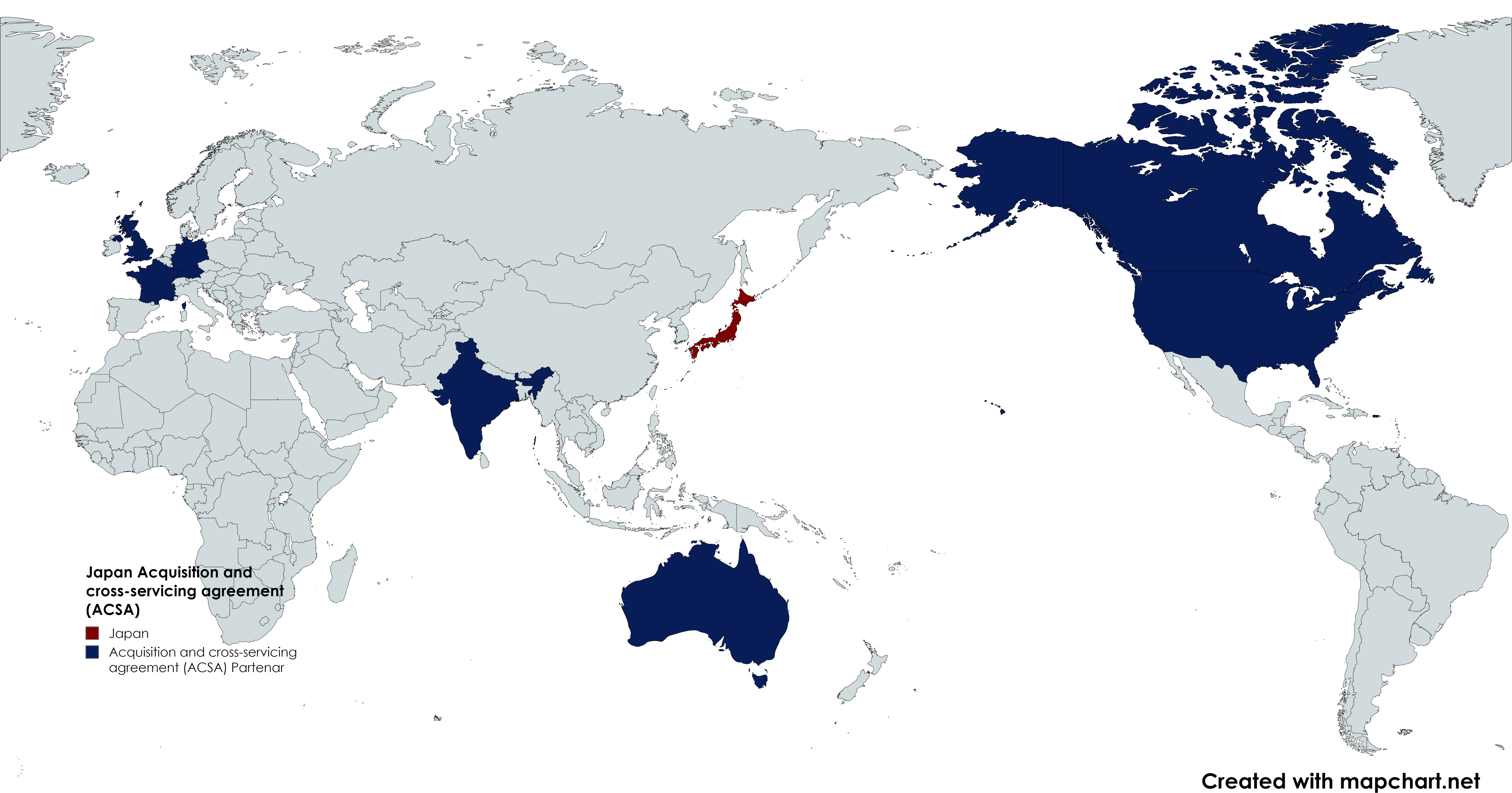
Japan Acquisition and cross servicing agreement (ACSA )

Japan have a signed the acquisition and cross-servicing agreement (ACSA) with 8 countries up to 25 November 2024 which are Australia, Canada, Germany, France, India, Italy, United Kingdom and the United States. In June 2025, Japan and the Philippines are negotiating for an ACSA agreement. It was fully passed in August 2026.
