= M-1 (Michigan highway) =

State highway in Michigan, United States

M-1
- Woodward Avenue
- M-1 highlighted in red

Route information
- Maintained by MDOT
- Length: 21.488 mi (34.582 km)
- Existed: 1970–present
- History: Woodward Avenue platted in 1805 and a state highway since 1913
- Tourist routes: Automotive Heritage Trail All-American Road; Woodward Avenue Recreational Heritage Route; MotorCities National Heritage Area
- NHS: Entire route

Major junctions
- South end: Adams Avenue in Detroit
- I-94 in Detroit; M-8 in Highland Park; M-102 at Detroit–Ferndale; I-696 in Royal Oak
- North end: BL I-75 / Bus. US 24 near Pontiac

Location
- Country: United States
- State: Michigan
- Counties: Wayne, Oakland

Highway system
- Michigan State Trunkline Highway System; Interstate; US; State; Byways
← I-696	→ US 2

M-1, also known as Woodward Avenue, is a north–south state trunkline highway in the Metro Detroit area of the US state of Michigan. The highway, called "Detroit's Main Street", runs from Detroit north-northwesterly to Pontiac. It is one of the five principal avenues of Detroit, along with Michigan, Grand River, Gratiot, and Jefferson avenues. These streets were platted in 1805 by Judge Augustus B. Woodward, namesake to Woodward Avenue. The Federal Highway Administration (FHWA) has listed the highway as the Automotive Heritage Trail, an All-American Road in the National Scenic Byways Program. It has also been designated a Pure Michigan Byway by the Michigan Department of Transportation (MDOT) and was also included in the MotorCities National Heritage Area designated by the US Congress in 1998.

The trunkline is the dividing line between Detroit's East and West sides and connects to some of the city's major freeways like Interstate 94 (I-94, Edsel Ford Freeway) and M-8 (Davison Freeway). Woodward Avenue exits Detroit at M-102 (8 Mile Road) and runs through the city's northern suburbs in Oakland County on its way to Pontiac. In between, Woodward Avenue passes through several historic districts in Detroit and provides access to many businesses in the area. The name Woodward Avenue has become synonymous with Detroit, cruising culture and the automotive industry.

Woodward Avenue was created after the Great Fire of 1805 in Detroit. The thoroughfare followed the route of the Saginaw Trail, an Indian trail that linked Detroit with Pontiac, Flint, and Saginaw. The Saginaw Trail connected to the Mackinaw Trail, which ran north to the Straits of Mackinac at the tip of the Lower Peninsula of Michigan. In the age of the auto trails, Woodward Avenue was part of the Theodore Roosevelt International Highway that connected Portland, Maine, with Portland, Oregon, through Ontario in Canada. It was also part of the Dixie Highway, which connected Michigan with Florida. Woodward Avenue was the location of the first mile (1.6 km) of concrete-paved roadway in the country. When Michigan created the State Trunkline Highway System in 1913, the roadway was included, numbered as part of M-10 in 1919. Later, it was part of US Highway 10 (US 10) following the creation of the United States Numbered Highway System. Since 1970, it has borne the M-1 designation. The roadway carried streetcar lines from the 1860s until the 1950s; a new streetcar line known as the QLine opened along part of M-1 in 2017.

== Route description ==
Like other state highways in Michigan, the section of Woodward Avenue designated M-1 is maintained by MDOT. In 2021, the department's traffic surveys showed that on average, 68,359 vehicles used the highway daily south of 14 Mile Road in Royal Oak and 15,909 vehicles did so each day in north of Chicago Boulevard in Detroit, the highest and lowest counts along the highway, respectively. All of M-1 is listed on the National Highway System, a network of roads important to the country's economy, defense, and mobility. As well as the sections of Woodward Avenue in Pontiac that are part of Business Loop I-75 (BL I-75) and Business US 24 (Bus. US 24), all of M-1 is a Pure Michigan Byway and an All-American Road. Woodward Avenue is considered to be the divider between the East and West sides of the city of Detroit.

=== Detroit and Highland Park ===
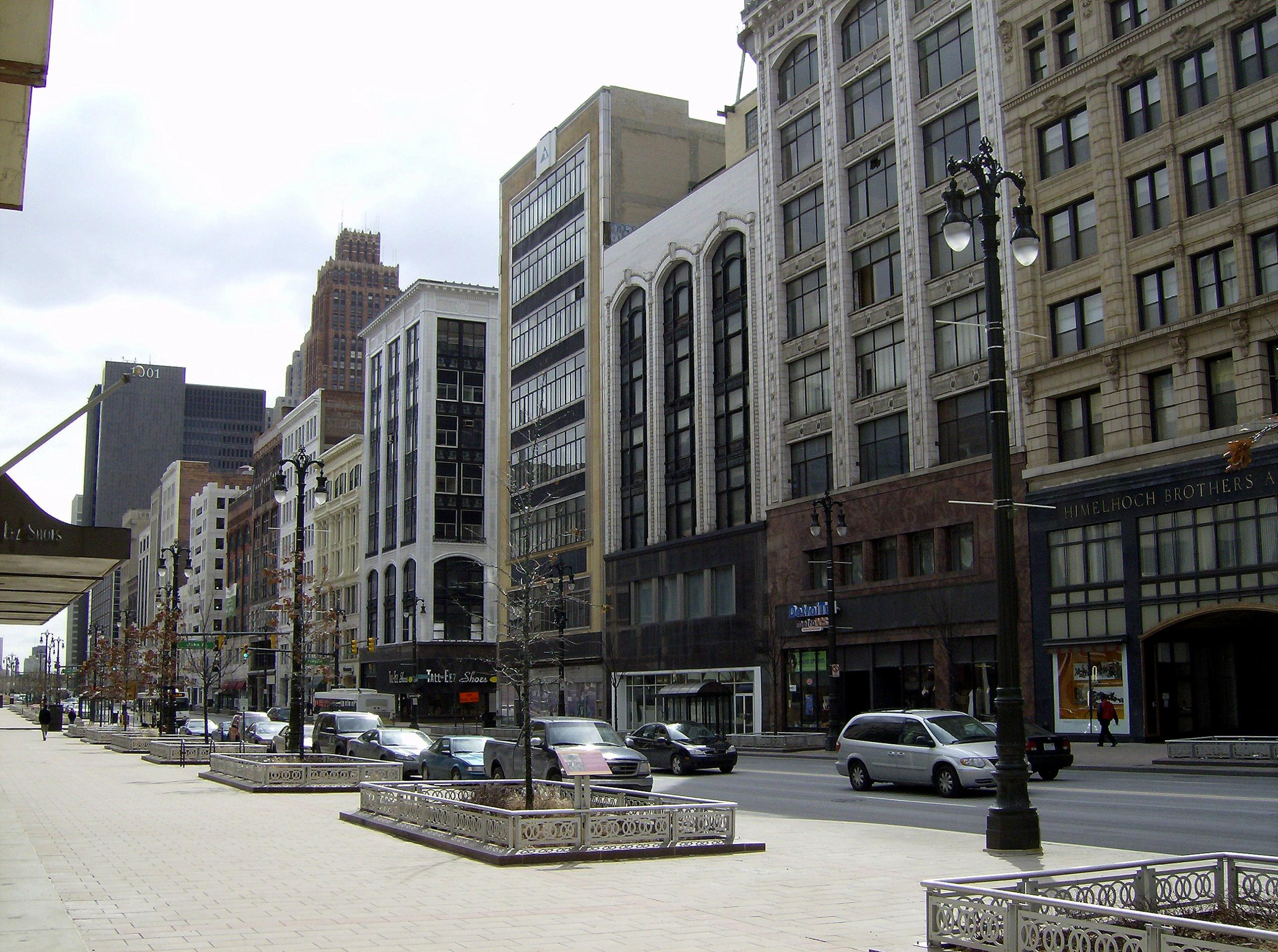
Merchants Row on Woodward between Grand Circus Park and Campus Martius Park in downtown Detroit, just south of the David Whitney Building

Woodward Avenue starts at an intersection with Jefferson Avenue next to Hart Plaza about 750 feet (230 m) from the Detroit River. The plaza is regarded as the birthplace of the Ford Motor Company, and it is located near Huntington Plaza and the Renaissance Center, headquarters for General Motors (GM). The first block of Woodward Avenue, between Jefferson Avenue and Larned Street, is a pedestrian plaza, the Spirit of Detroit Plaza, home of the namesake statue used to symbolize the city. Woodward Avenue runs north-northwesterly away from the river through the heart of downtown Detroit and the Financial District. Along the way, it passes several important and historic sites, including notable buildings like One Woodward Avenue, the Guardian Building, and The Qube. Further north, Woodward Avenue runs around Campus Martius Park and enters the Lower Woodward Avenue Historic District, a retail, commercial, and residential district listed on the National Register of Historic Places (NRHP). After that historic district, the avenue travels through the middle of Grand Circus Park; the northern edge of the park is bounded by Adams Avenue, where state maintenance begins.

North of Adams Avenue, Woodward Avenue is a state trunkline designated M-1. The highway crosses to the west of Comerica Park and Ford Field, home of Major League Baseball's Detroit Tigers and the National Football League's Detroit Lions, respectively. Woodward passes the historic Fox Theatre before it crosses over I-75 (Fisher Freeway) without an interchange; access between the two highways is through the service drives that connect to adjacent interchanges. North of the freeway, M-1 passes Little Caesars Arena, home of the National Hockey League's Detroit Red Wings and the National Basketball Association's Detroit Pistons. A six-lane street, the highway travels through mixed residential and commercial areas of Midtown including the Midtown Woodward Historic District, another district listed on the NRHP. South of I-94, Woodward heads through the Cultural Center Historic District, which includes the campus of Wayne State University, the Detroit Public Library, and the Detroit Institute of Arts; the institute and the nearby Detroit Historical Museum showcase the city's automotive history.

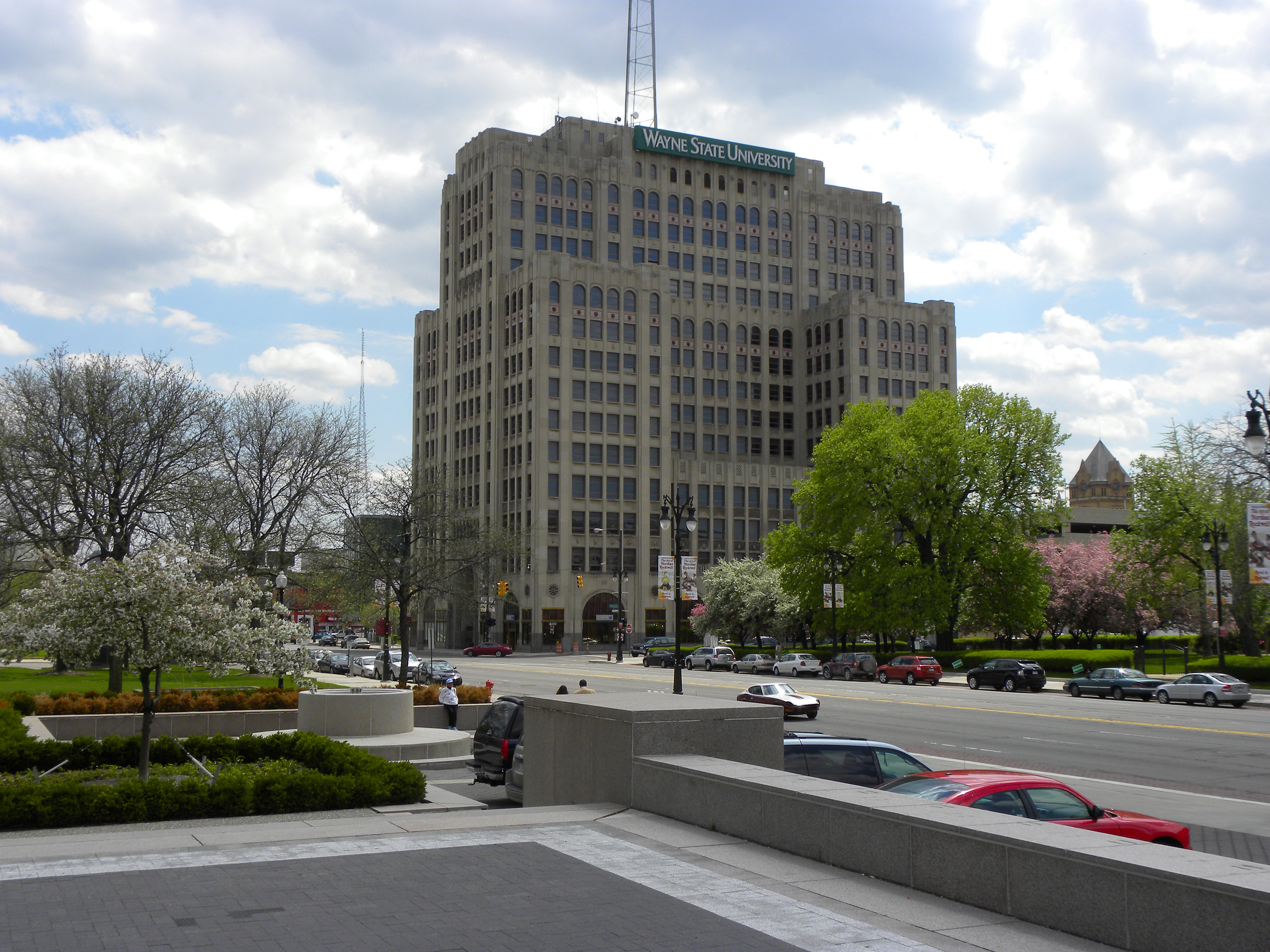
Maccabees Building at Wayne State University adjacent to Woodward Avenue in Detroit

North of I-94, Woodward passes through New Center; this district is home to Cadillac Place, the former headquarters of GM. The neighborhoods on either side of the highway transition in composition north of New Center; this area is mostly residential in nature. Between the intersections with Webb Street/Woodland Street and Tuxedo Street/Tennyson Street, Woodward Avenue leaves the city of Detroit for the first time and crosses into Highland Park, an enclave within Detroit. It is within Highland Park that M-1 intersects M-8, the Davison Freeway. Woodward passes over the Davison, which was the first urban, depressed freeway in the US, at an interchange south of Highland Park's downtown business district. M-1 crosses that district and runs next to the historic Highland Park Ford Plant, home of the original moving assembly line used to produce Model Ts; opened in 1910, the plant's assembly line dropped the time needed to build a car from 12 hours to 93 minutes and allowed Ford to meet demand for the car.

M-1 crosses back into Detroit at the intersection with McNichols Road; the latter street occupies the 6 Mile location in Detroit's Mile Road System. North of this intersection, Woodward Avenue widens into a boulevard, a divided street with a median; left turns along this section of roadway are made by performing a Michigan left maneuver using the U-turn crossovers in the median. Between McNichols and 7 Mile Road, Woodward Avenue travels to the east of the Detroit Golf Club in the Palmer Park area. North of 7 Mile, the highway runs to the west of the Michigan State Fairgrounds and to the east of the Palmer Woods Historic District. The northern edge of the fairgrounds is at M-102 (8 Mile Road), which is also where Woodward Avenue exits Detroit for the second time; the two boulevards cross in a large interchange.

=== Oakland County ===
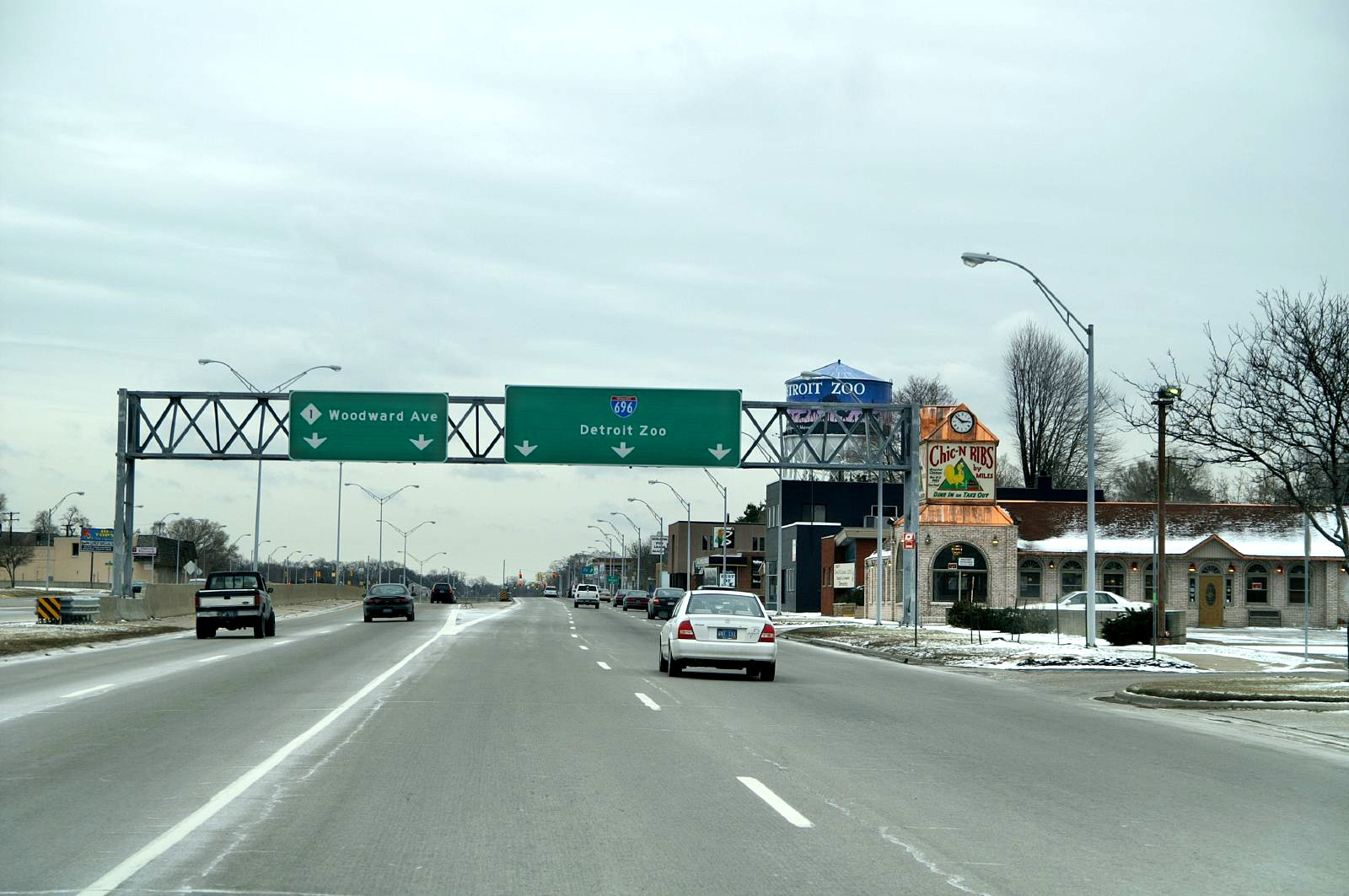
M-1 southbound approaching I-696

Crossing the border into the suburb of Ferndale in Oakland County, the highway runs through residential neighborhoods but is lined with adjacent businesses. The intersection with 9 Mile Road marks the suburb's downtown area. Further north in Pleasant Ridge, the north-northwesterly path of Woodward Avenue changes as the road turns to the northwest. After the curve, M-1 meets I-696 (Reuther Freeway); immediately north of this interchange in Huntington Woods is the Detroit Zoo. North of 11 Mile Road, Woodward Avenue forms the border between Berkley to the west and Royal Oak to the east. The highway passes the Roseland Park Cemetery north of 12 Mile Road before crossing fully into Royal Oak. Near 13 Mile Road, the trunkline passes through a commercial district anchored by a shopping center and Beaumont Hospital. North of 14 Mile Road in Birmingham, M-1 and Woodward Avenue leaves the original route, which is named Old Woodward Avenue, and runs to the east of it to bypass that suburb's downtown area. The highway crosses the River Rouge and returns to its original routing north of Maple (15 Mile) Road.

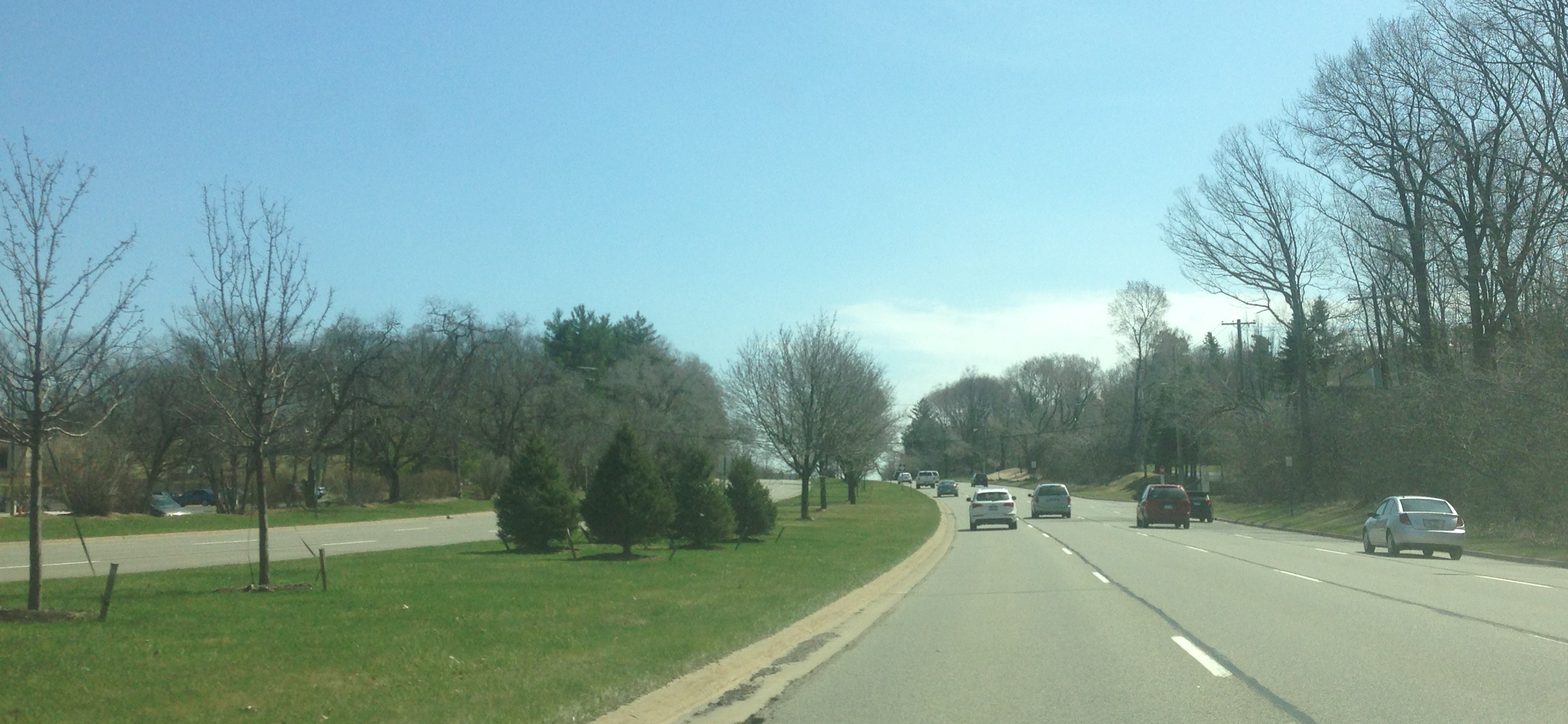
Looking south along M-1 in Bloomfield Hills

North of Birmingham, Woodward crosses through part of Bloomfield Township for the first time before entering Bloomfield Hills. That suburb's downtown is centered on the intersection with Long Lake Road; Woodward passes between a pair of golf courses north of there. The highway enters the south side of Pontiac's residential neighborhoods after crossing back into Bloomfield Township. At the intersection with Square Lake Road, M-1 terminates. Woodward Avenue continues northwesterly into Pontiac carrying the BL I-75 and Bus. US 24 designations; it terminates after the two directions of the boulevard diverge and form a one-way loop around the city's business district.

== Cultural significance ==
=== Scenic and historic designations ===
All-American Road signs installed in 2011

Many historical sites are located along Woodward Avenue, which was included in the MotorCities National Heritage Area when it was created on November 6, 1998. The road was designated what is now called a Pure Michigan Byway by MDOT in 1999, and a National Scenic Byway by the FHWA National Scenic Byways Program on June 13, 2002, the only urban road at the time with that classification. It was later upgraded to All-American Road status on October 16, 2009; such roads have highly unique features and are significant enough to be tourist destinations unto themselves. In announcing the byway status in 2002, Norman Mineta, then United States Secretary of Transportation, said that "Woodward Avenue put the world on wheels, and America's automobile heritage is represented along this corridor."

Lighted tribute in Royal Oak at 13 Mile Road

The Woodward Avenue Action Association (WA3), the local agency that acts as the stewards and advocates for the All-American Road and Pure Michigan Byway designations as well as adjacent historical sites, obtained a grant for $45,000 (equivalent to $62,000 in 2024) from the FHWA in 2011 to install a set of 50 custom road signs along M-1 between Detroit and Pontiac. WA3 sells replicas of these signs to discourage theft. (Note: Another highway, M-22 in Northern Michigan has also been the subject of sign theft with different methods used to deter sign removal.) Profits are also being used along with money from clothing and other merchandise to support the Woodward Avenue Beautification Fund, a special endowment created in 2010 to aid the 11 communities along the highway with maintenance and to defray costs associated with special events on the avenue.

As well as the custom signage, WA3 has received FHWA grant funding to erect a series of lighted "tributes": solar-powered, lighted pillars that contain artwork related to the roadway. The $150,000 glass and concrete sculptures are being placed in the median along Woodward Avenue to serve as landmarks along the route of the roadway and to brand it for tourists. A total of 10 to 12 installations are planned for the length of the highway in Wayne and Oakland counties. The art project received a 2011 National Scenic Byway Award for the Byways interpretation category.

=== Religion, entertainment, and cars ===
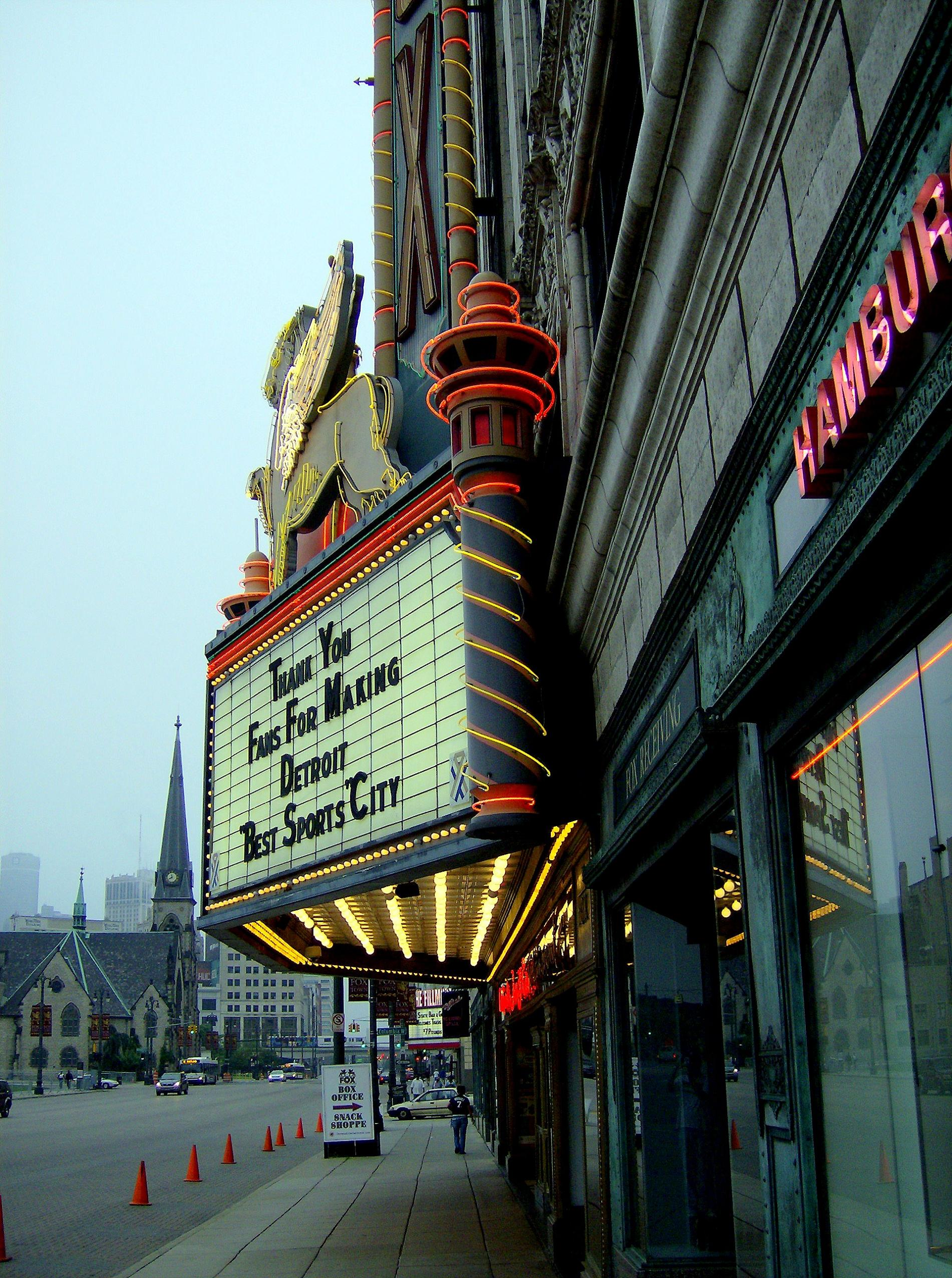
Marquee of the Fox Theatre with the Central United Methodist Church in the background

The area around Woodward was once nicknamed "Piety Hill". There are 22 churches on the NRHP along the street in Detroit and Highland Park. According to The Detroit News, the sounds of church bells and horse hooves were some of the most distinctive sounds on Sundays along Woodward Avenue in the early 20th century. The street was home to jazz clubs starting in the 1910s and 1920s, starting a period of transition. During the 1940s, ministers lobbied for a law to prevent the issuance of additional liquor licenses in their neighborhood; the law was later overturned in 1950. Nightclubs along Woodward hosted a burgeoning music scene in the early days of rock 'n roll, and the area also had plenty of bars and burlesque shows as late as the 1970s. One local journalist called the mix of churches, clubs, and bars along Woodward Avenue "a precarious balance between the sacred and the profane".

As well as music clubs, many of Detroit's other major entertainment venues are located on or near Woodward in downtown Detroit, including the Fox Theatre, Majestic Theater, and the rest of the theater district, the second-largest in the country. During World War II, the area was likewise home to 24-hour movie theaters and bowling alleys. Curfews across the river in Windsor, Ontario, meant that many patrons during the war years were Canadian. They frequented the establishments along with the Americans, many of whom worked in the factories of the Detroit area. The theater district has undergone a renaissance after renovations and improvements during the 1980s and 1990s, leading to a resurgence in the performing arts in the city. In 2002, the Fox Theatre outsold the larger Radio City Music Hall in Manhattan, earning the "No. 1 theater in North America" title from Pollstar, an industry trade journal, and the district is considered the second largest in the country. An adjacent sports and entertainment district has been created near Woodward Avenue in the 21st century. "District Detroit" as it is called includes Comerica Park (2000), Ford Field (2002) and Little Caesars Arena (2017), which are the home venues for all four of Detroit's professional sports teams. The district is the most compact collection in any American city, according to Patrick Rishe, the director of the Sports Business Program at Washington University in St. Louis.

Woodward Avenue's connection to Detroit's automobile culture dates to the early 20th century. Around 100 automobile companies were founded along the roadway. Henry Ford developed and first produced the Model T in 1907–08 at his Piquette Avenue Plant to the east of Woodward Avenue. The first 12,000 Model Ts were built there, before Ford moved production of his cars to the Highland Park plant adjacent to Woodward Avenue in 1910. Employees at the plant used the streetcar system along Woodward to get to work; these lines also provided transportation options to assembly plant workers affected by gas rationing during World War II. During the 1950s and 1960s, automobile engineers street tested their cars along Woodward Avenue between 8 Mile and Square Lake roads; the roadway was the only such location where this activity was practiced.

=== Woodward Dream Cruise ===
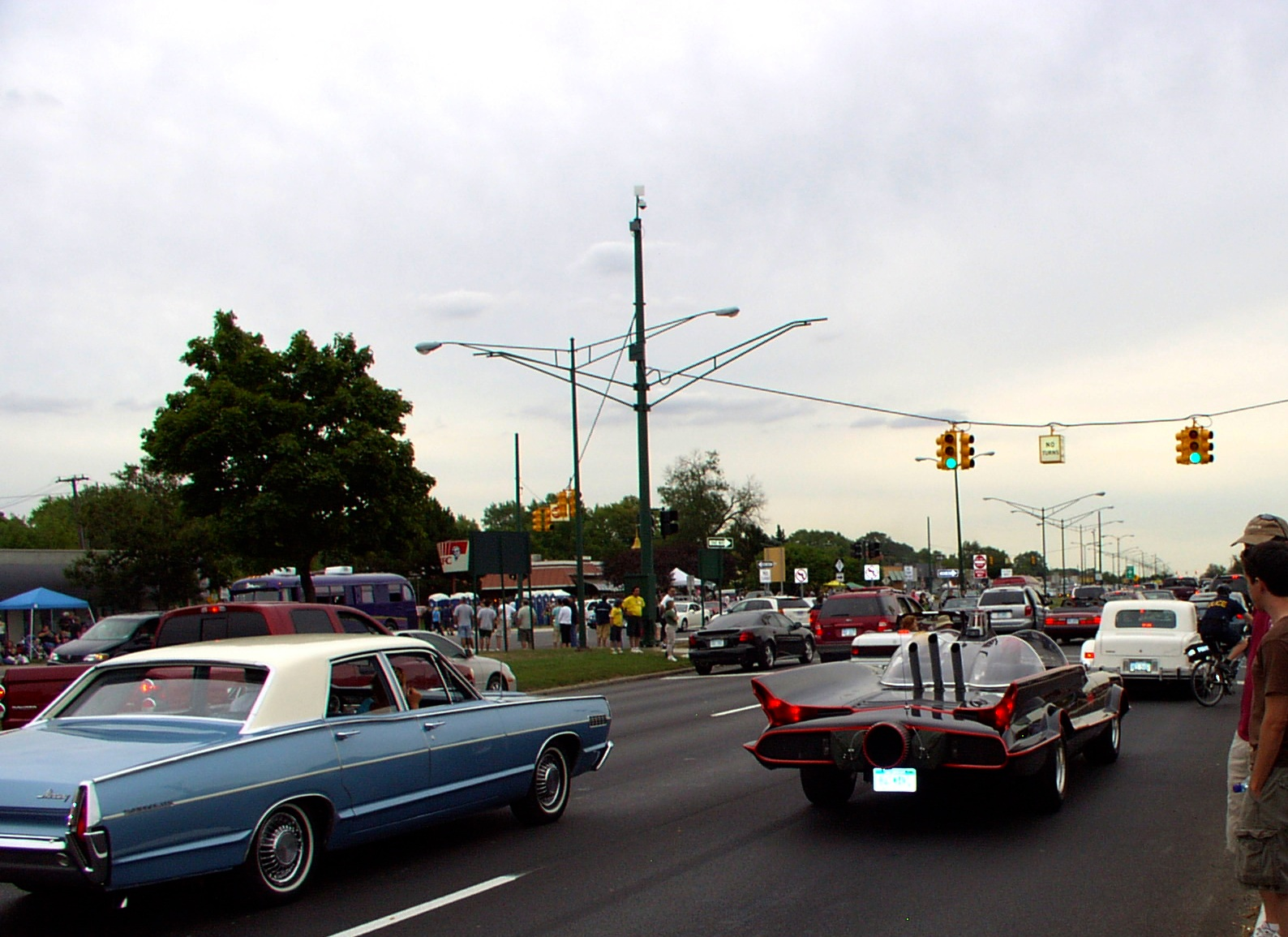
Batmobile at the Woodward Dream Cruise

Young carriage drivers raced one another along Woodward Avenue after the roadway was converted from logs to planks in 1848. They placed bets on each other's carriages while racing from tavern to tavern. By 1958, the roadway was used for unofficial street racing with cars. The wide width, median and sections lacking a large commercial presence attracted a reputation for the competition. The numerous drive-ins, each with its dedicated local teenaged clientele, were also popular. Woodward had numerous car dealerships and automobile accessory shops in the age of the muscle car which completed the formula for young adults to "cruise", race and hang out along the road.

The Woodward Dream Cruise takes place on Woodward Avenue between Pontiac and Ferndale during August of each year, evoking nostalgia of the 1950s and 1960s, when it was common for young drivers to cruise with their cars on Woodward Avenue. The event attracts huge crowds of classic car owners and admirers from around the world to the Metro Detroit area in celebration of Detroit's automotive history; an estimated one million spectators attended the 2009 event. The cruise was founded in 1995 as a fundraiser for a soccer field in Ferndale. Neighboring cities joined in, and by 1997, auto manufacturers and other vendors had begun sponsoring the event.

== History ==
=== Indian trails and plank roads ===
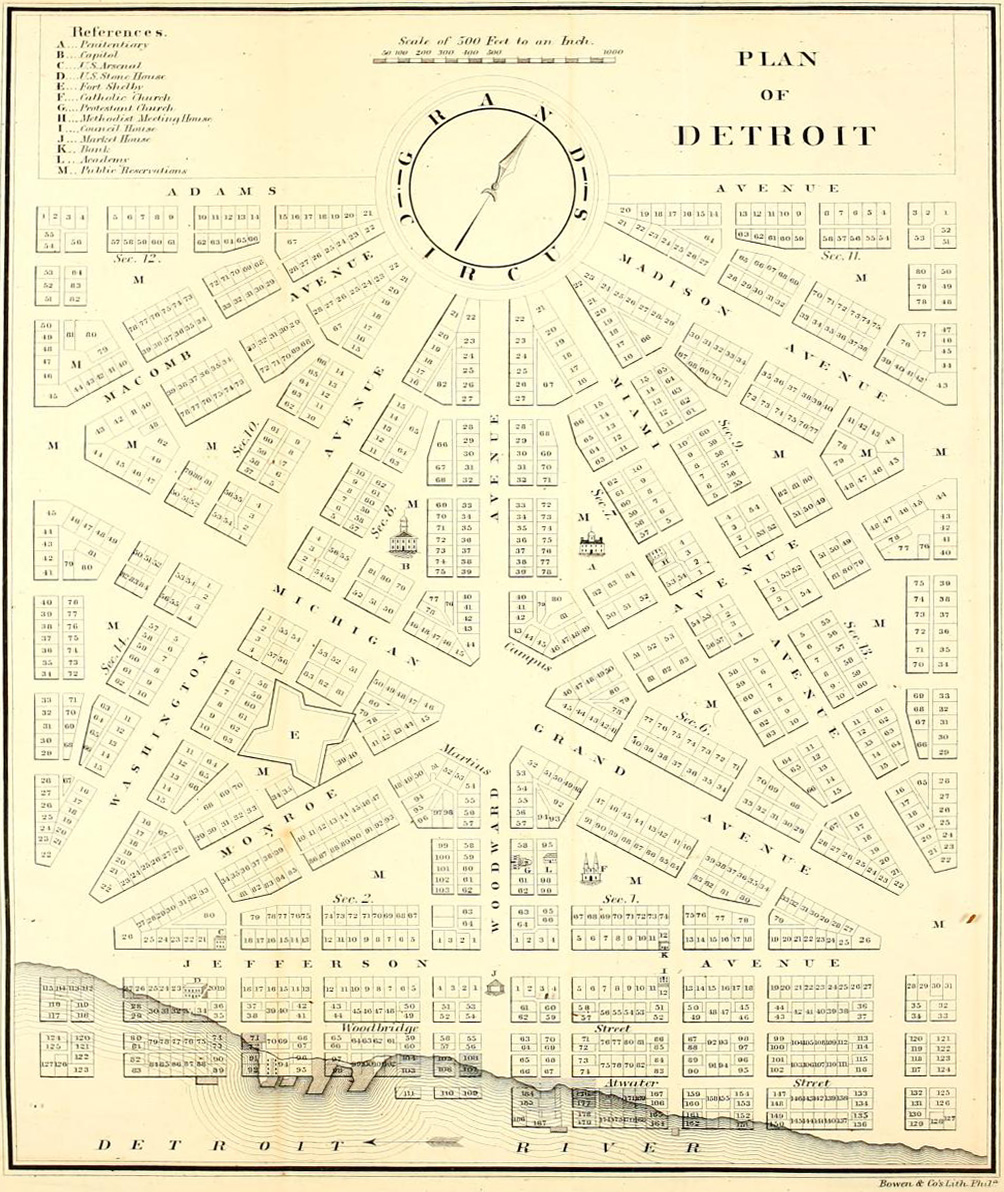
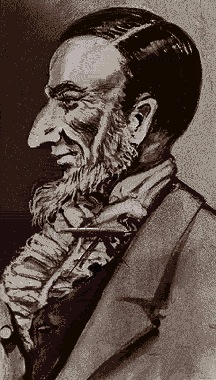
The street plan for Detroit (left) devised by Judge Woodward (right)

In 1701, the first transportation routes through what became the state of Michigan were the lakes, rivers and Indian trails. One of these, the Saginaw Trail, followed what is now Woodward Avenue from the Detroit area north to Saginaw, where it connected with the Mackinaw Trail north to the Straits of Mackinac. The Town of Detroit (Note: Detroit was incorporated as a town in 1802 by the government of the Northwest Territory before incorporation and reincorporation as a city by the Michigan Territory in 1806 and 1815.) created 120-foot-wide (37 m) rights-of-way for the principal streets of the city in 1805. This street plan was devised by Augustus Woodward and others following a devastating fire in Detroit, with a mandate from the territorial governor to improve on the previous plan. Two of these principal streets were established by the territorial government on September 18, 1805, as "permanent public roads, avenues or highways", one of which was to run along the modern routing of Woodward Avenue. The wide avenues, in emulation of the street plan for Washington, DC, were intended to make Detroit look like the "Paris of the West".

Augustus Woodward was a judge in the Michigan Territory appointed by his friend, President Thomas Jefferson. He was also a colonel in the territorial militia and a president of one of Detroit's first banks. Woodward named the street for himself, responding whimsically to the resulting criticism: "Not so. The avenue is named Woodward because it runs wood-ward, toward the woods." (Note: Woodward used other similar word plays to explain street names, according to George Catlin, a Detroit historian. "Atwater Street, the Judge said, was not named for Reuben Atwater, but because it was literally 'at water,' being on the riverfront".) Other proposals for names included Court House Street or Market Street. For a time, one section was named Congress Street, Witherell Street, Saginaw Road or Saginaw Turnpike, with another section dubbed Pontiac Road. Unlike these other monikers, the avenue retained the judge's name.

Detroit was incorporated in 1815, and the initial roadway to connect Detroit north to Pontiac along the Saginaw Trail was started in 1817; this was a corduroy road built by laying down logs and filling in the gaps with clay or sand. The territorial legislature authorized a survey of the roadway to Pontiac on December 7, 1818, and the route was approved by Governor Lewis Cass on December 15, 1819, the first to be done in the future state. The Michigan Legislature authorized the construction of a private plank road with tolls to connect Detroit with Pontiac in 1848. By the next year, 16-foot-wide (4.9 m) and 3-inch-thick (7.6 cm) oak planks were laid along the road between the two communities. Tolls were one cent per mile (0.62 ¢/km) for vehicles and two cents per mile (1.2 ¢/km) for a herd of cattle. Tolls along some segments of Woodward Avenue remained in place as late as 1908.

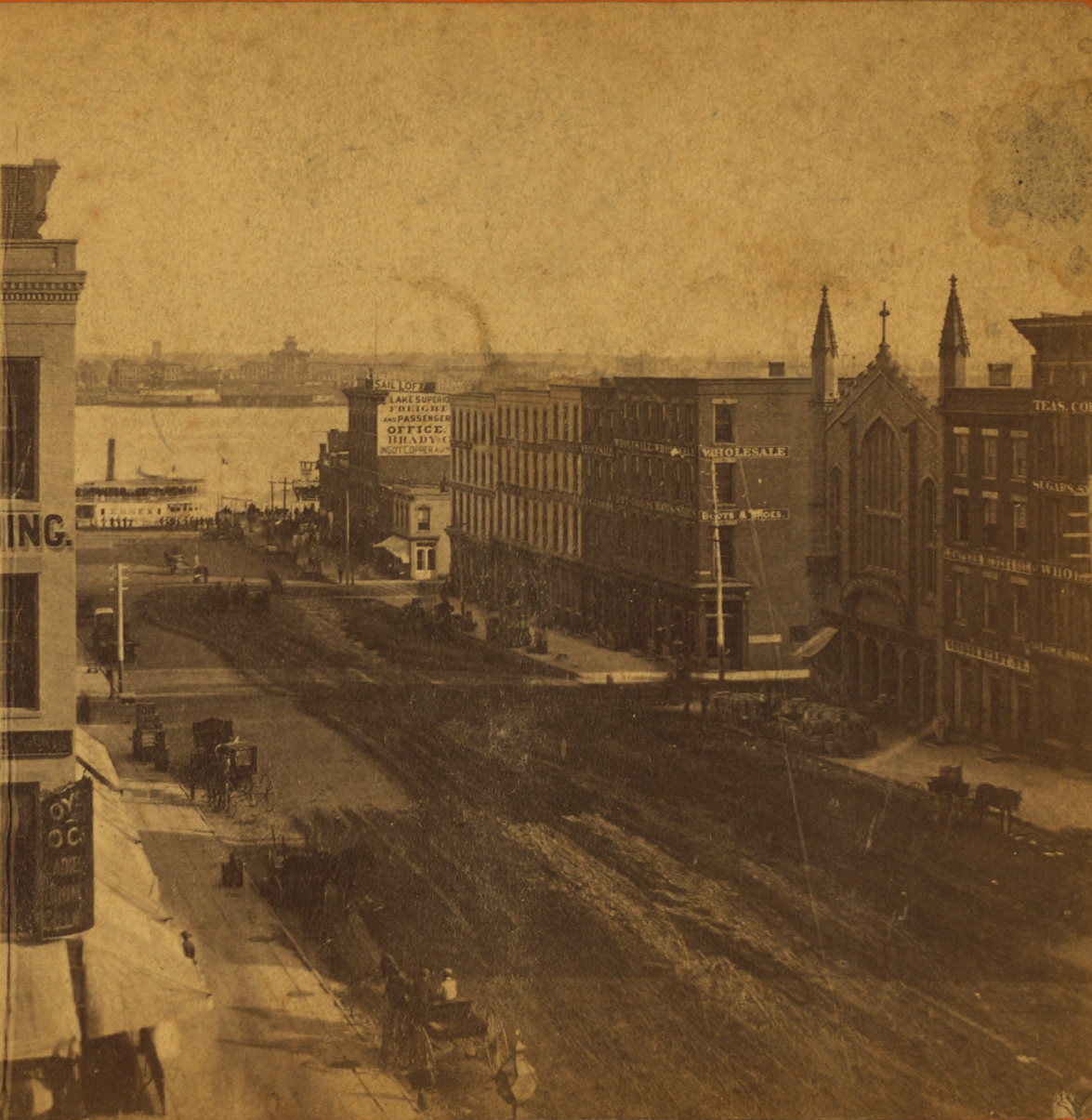
Woodward Avenue, c. 1875, as a dirt street looking south to the Detroit River

The first automobile in Detroit was driven by Charles Brady King along Woodward Avenue on March 3, 1896, a few weeks before Henry Ford drove his first car in the city. In 1909, the first mile (1.6 km) of concrete roadway in the country was paved between 6 and 7 Mile roads at a cost of $14,000 (equivalent to $349,000 in 2024).

=== State Trunkline era ===
On May 13, 1913, the Legislature created the state's highway system; Woodward Avenue was included as part of "Division 2". The full length was paved in 1916. The first crow's nest traffic tower in the US was installed at the intersection of Woodward and Michigan avenues on October 9, 1917; the tower elevated a police officer above the center of the intersection to direct traffic before the structure was replaced in October 1920 with the world's first four-way traffic light. The state signposted its highways in 1919, and Woodward Avenue was assigned the M-10 designation. The same year, two auto trail designations were applied to the avenue. The Theodore Roosevelt International Highway was created in February 1919, running from Detroit northward along Woodward Avenue. Later that year, the Dixie Highway was extended through Detroit to the Straits of Mackinac, following the route of the old Saginaw Trail northward along Woodward Avenue.

Since 1924, Woodward Avenue has hosted America's Thanksgiving Parade, the second oldest Thanksgiving Day parade in the United States. In 1925, the intersection between Woodward Avenue and State Street was busier than Times Square. On November 11, 1926, the United States Numbered Highway System was approved by the American Association of State Highway Officials (AASHO); the M-10 designation along Woodward was replaced with US 10, a moniker that ran from Detroit to Seattle, Washington.

Legal disputes over a plan to widen Woodward Avenue dating back to 1874 were resolved in 1932. Permission was needed from a majority of the landowners along Woodward Avenue to finalize the deal. John W. Chandler, general manager of the Woodward Avenue Improvement Association, pledged not to shave his face until he had the necessary permissions in hand. This resolution allowed Woodward to be widened from 66 to 120 feet (20 to 37 m). Several buildings were removed to clear the wider street path, and St. John's Episcopal Church was moved 60 feet (18 m) to avoid demolition. Work started in 1933 and cost $7.5 million (equivalent to $144 million in 2024) to complete.

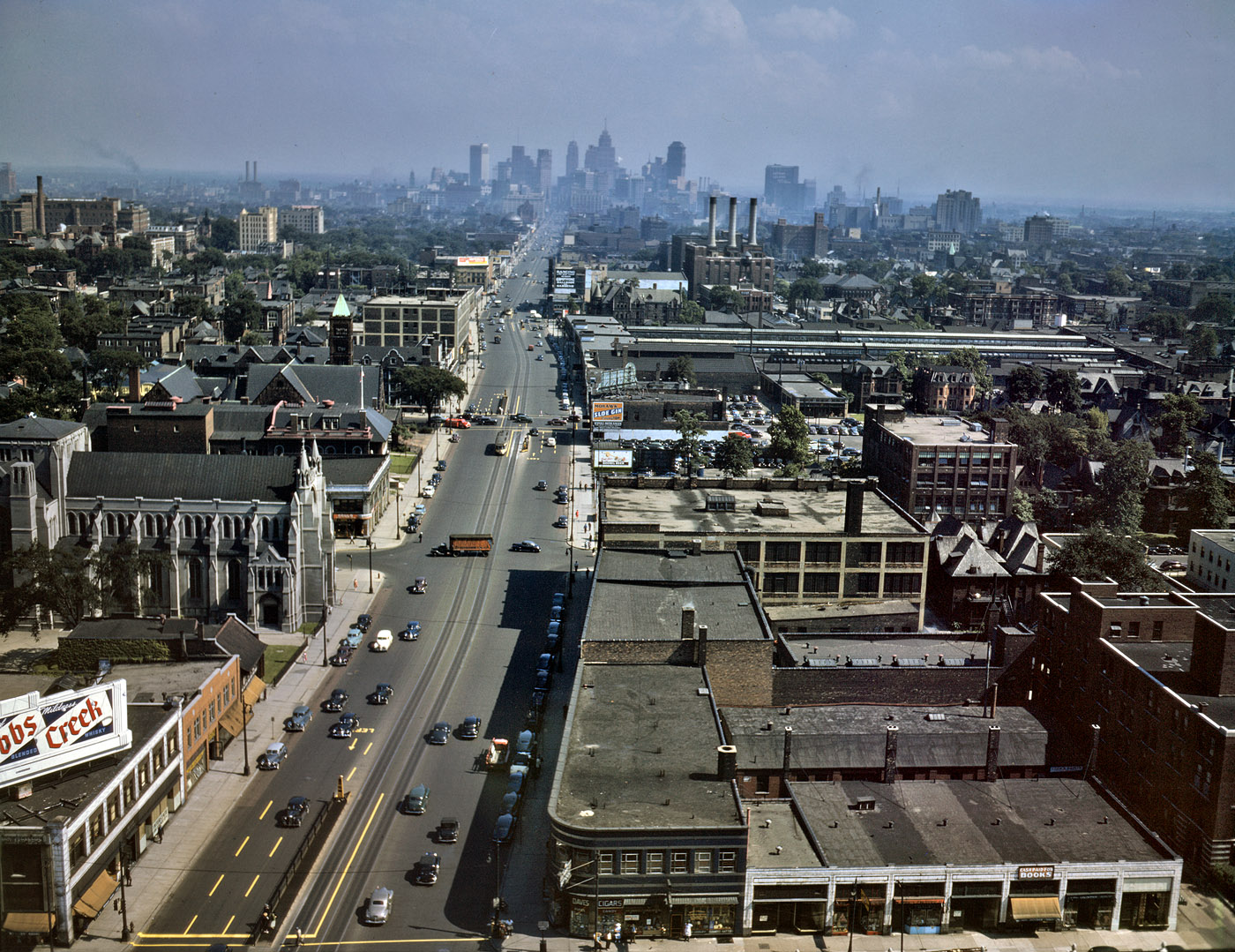
Looking south down Woodward Avenue from the Maccabees Building with the Detroit skyline in the distance, July 1942; streetcar tracks are visible in the middle of the street.

A bypass of downtown Birmingham opened in 1939, drawing through traffic away from the busy Woodward Avenue–Maple Road intersection. The bypass was originally named Hunter Boulevard. On September 6, 1997, Birmingham renamed the bypass to Woodward Avenue, with the previous alignment of Woodward signed as Old Woodward Avenue.

In October 1969, AASHO approved a realignment of US 10 in the Detroit area; the next year the designation was rerouted to follow the Lodge Freeway (what is now M-10) and the portion of Jefferson Avenue between the Lodge Freeway and Randolph Street (then US 25, now M-3). The M-1 designation was applied to the section of Woodward Avenue from Jefferson Avenue in downtown Detroit to Square Lake Road along the southern border of Pontiac. Woodward north of Square Lake Road was designated as a business route of both US 10 and I-75. When US 10 was truncated to Bay City in 1986, the Bus. US 10 portion of Woodward became Bus. US 24.

In the early 1980s, M-1 was truncated in downtown Detroit, as the Woodward Mall was designated in the area around Cadillac Square. At the end of 2000, MDOT proposed several highway transfers in Detroit. Some of these involved transferring city streets in the Campus Martius Park area under the department's jurisdiction to city control; another part of the proposal involved MDOT assuming control over a section of Woodward Avenue from Adams Avenue south to Grand River Avenue. These transfers were completed the following year. In 2004, the southern terminus was moved north three blocks to Adams Avenue. A massive address renumbering project ensued along Woodward Avenue in 1997, creating a consistent numbering system from downtown Detroit to Pontiac. Previously, each city along the route had its own address system. In June 2017, the southernmost block of Woodward Avenue south of Larned Street closed to automobiles to create a temporary pedestrian plaza. This closure was made permanent the following November.

=== Streetcars and other public transportation ===
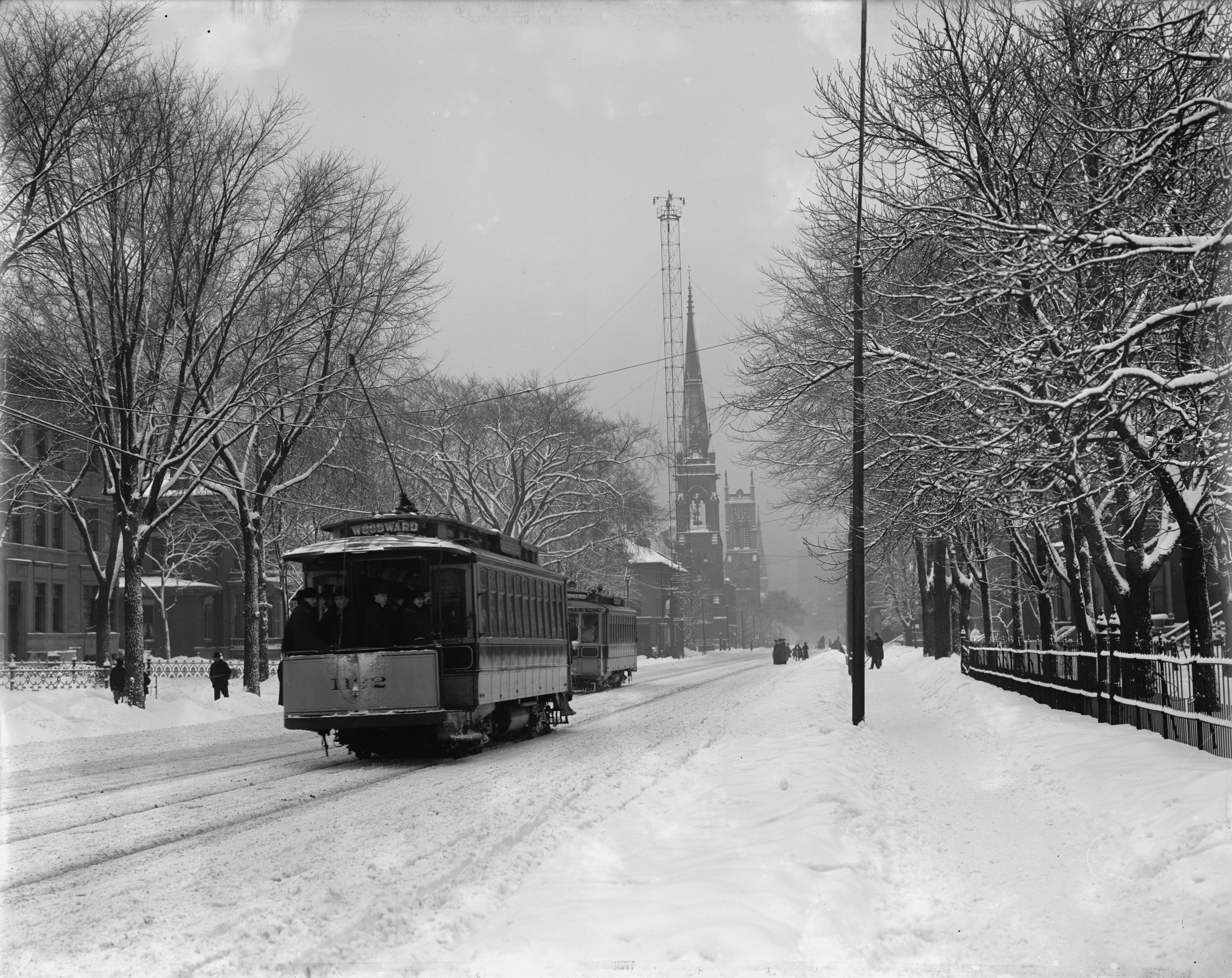
Streetcars on Woodward Avenue during the winter between 1900 and 1910

On August 27, 1863, the Detroit City Railway Company (DCRC) established streetcar service along Woodward from Jefferson to Adams avenues. The company was formed by investors from Syracuse, New York, earlier that year. Later, on September 18, 1886, a separate electrified line, the Highland Park Railway, was added that ran along Woodward Avenue through Highland Park. In mid-December 1893, the main streetcar line was electrified by the DCRC. In 1901, the various lines throughout the city were consolidated as the Detroit United Railway.

Detroit took control of the Detroit Unified Railway on May 15, 1922; afterwards, the streetcar system became the city's Department of Street Railways. (Note: Since July 1, 1974, the Department of Street Railways has been renamed the Detroit Department of Transportation, the agency responsible for the city's bus system. That bus system was started in 1925 as a feeder network to serve the streetcar lines.) Following the change in control, the city also formed the Detroit Rapid Transit Commission to build a subway system. Early proposals included a station under Woodward Avenue next to Detroit City Hall. In 1926, a four-line system encompassing 47 miles (76 km) of lines was proposed at a cost of $280 million (equivalent to $3.96 billion in 2024). By 1929, plans were scaled back further in the face of tough local economic conditions; the plan submitted to voters included one line of 13.3 miles (21.4 km) that interconnected with the city's streetcar system by way of two 2.5-mile-long (4.0 km) streetcar tunnels. The bond proposal failed by a 2.5:1 margin that year, killing any proposal for a city subway system in Detroit.

The streetcar system, like those in other cities across the US, fell into decline after World War II. Unlike the streetcar conspiracy alleged in other cities, the decline of Detroit's publicly owned system was related to a multitude of different factors. Increased spending on roads benefitted competing bus lines, and zoning changes coupled with freeway construction shifted the city's population to areas away from the older streetcar lines. During the early 1950s, several lines were converted to buses after labor strikes, and other lines were eliminated. On April 8, 1956, a parade was held when the last streetcars stopped running along Woodward Avenue and in Detroit; the remaining cars were sent to Mexico City.

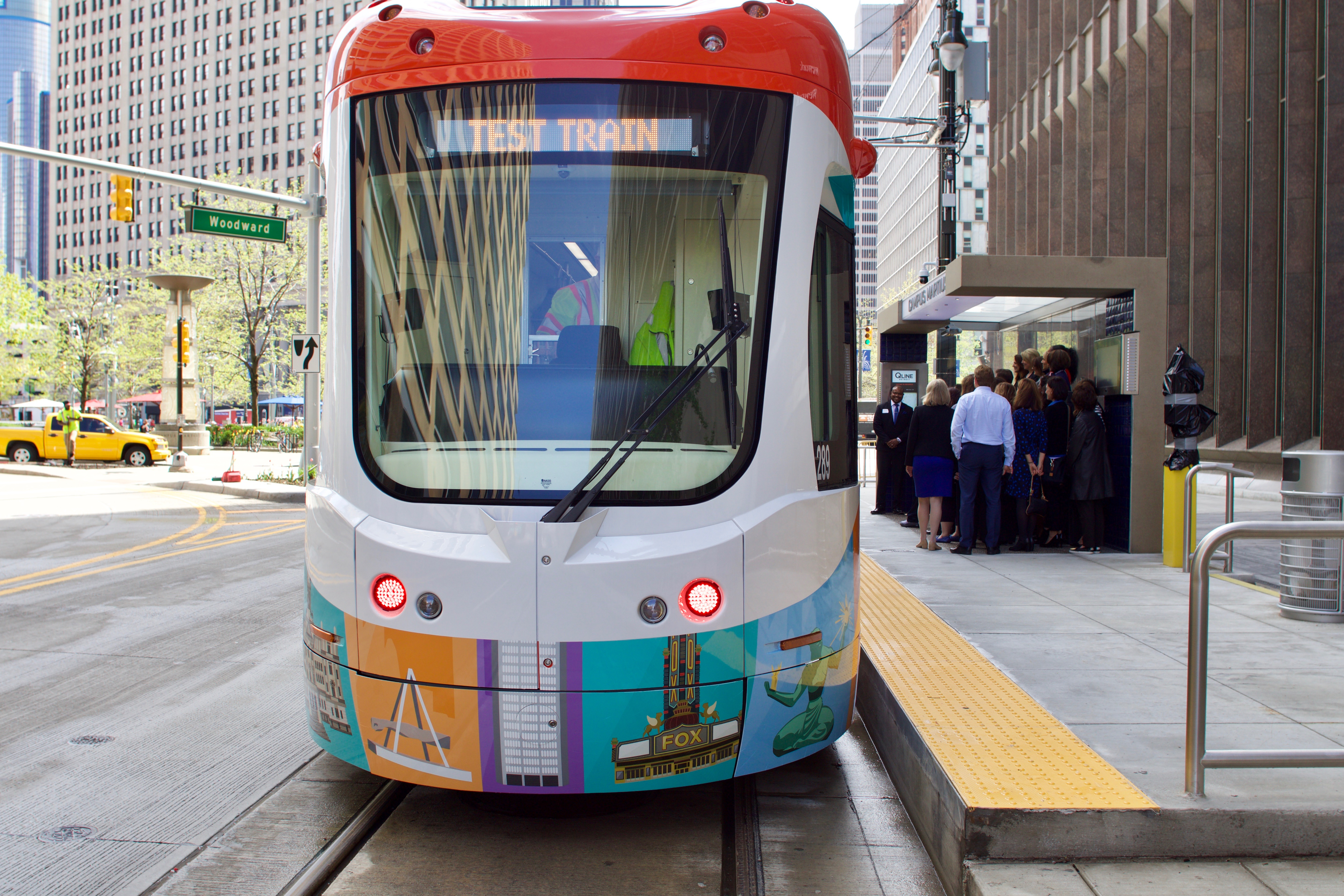
QLine streetcar at Campus Martius

In the first decade of the 21st century, local business and government officials proposed two projects to add modern streetcars to M-1, an approximately nine-mile-long (14 km) line from the transit center at Michigan Avenue north to the state fairgrounds, or a 3.4-mile (5.5 km) line in the downtown area only. Suggestions to unify the two plans were made in late 2008, and the Detroit City Council approved the sale of $125 million in bonds on April 11, 2011, for the longer system. Through various approvals in 2011, and subsequent changes including a bus rapid transit system with a dedicated Woodward Avenue bus lane, private investors who supported the shorter three-mile line to New Center continued developing that project.

On July 28, 2014, construction started for a streetcar line to stretch from downtown Detroit to Grand Boulevard in New Center. The line was to have 20 different stations serving 12 stops, with most of the stations curbside on either side of Woodward Avenue going uptown or downtown. The line will have center road stations at the north and south ends of the system. Named QLine in 2016, the system opened in May 2017. The last car of Detroit's previous streetcar system was numbered 286, so the planners numbered the cars for the new line 287–292 to pick up where the old number series had left off.

== Major intersections ==
County	Location	mi	km	Destinations	Notes
Wayne	Detroit	0.000	0.000	Adams Avenue; Woodward Avenue south	Southern terminus of M-1; Woodward Avenue continues to Jefferson Avenue
Wayne	Detroit	2.053– 2.065	3.304– 3.323	I-94 east (Edsel Ford Freeway) – Port Huron	Indirect access from exit 215C on eastbound I-94
Wayne	Highland Park	5.115– 5.127	8.232– 8.251	M-8 (Davison Freeway)	
Wayne–Oakland county line	Detroit–Ferndale city line	8.453– 8.463	13.604– 13.620	M-102 (8 Mile Road)	Three-level diamond interchange
Oakland	Royal Oak	10.688– 10.700	17.201– 17.220	I-696 (Walter P. Reuther Freeway) / Main Street – Lansing, Port Huron, Detroit Zoo	Exit 16 on I-696
Oakland	Bloomfield Township	21.460– 21.488	34.537– 34.582	BL I-75 (Square Lake Road east, Woodward Avenue north) / Bus. US 24 (Square Lake Road west, Woodward Avenue north)	Northern terminus of M-1; Woodward Avenue continues into downtown Pontiac
1.000 mi = 1.609 km; 1.000 km = 0.621 mi: Incomplete access

== See also ==
- List of buildings on Woodward Avenue
