= Michigan State Trunkline Highway System =

Highway system in Michigan

State Trunkline Highway System
- Highway markers for Interstate 75, US Highway 23, and M-28

- A map of state trunkline highways in the state of Michigan; Interstates US Highways State

System information
- Maintained by MDOT and MBA
- Length: 9,669 mi (Note: Measurement as of July 7, 2015.) (15,561 km)
- Formed: May 13, 1913, signed by July 1, 1919

Highway names
- Interstates: Interstate n (I-n)
- US Highways: US Highway n (US n)

System links
- Michigan State Trunkline Highway System; Interstate; US; State; Byways

The State Trunkline Highway System consists of all the state highways in Michigan, including those designated as Interstate, United States Numbered (US Highways), or State Trunkline highways. In their abbreviated format, these classifications are applied to highway numbers with an I-, US, or M- prefix, respectively. The system is maintained by the Michigan Department of Transportation (MDOT) and comprises 9,669 miles (15,561 km) of trunklines in all 83 counties of the state on both the Upper and Lower peninsulas (UP, LP), which are linked by the Mackinac Bridge. (Note: The Mackinac Bridge Authority (MBA) is an independent state agency responsible for the Mackinac Bridge and thus maintains that section of the overall highway system. The MBA works with MDOT but does not report to it. The executive secretary of the MBA is appointed by MDOT with MBA approval.) Components of the system range in scale from 10-lane urban freeways with local-express lanes to two-lane rural undivided highways to a non-motorized highway on Mackinac Island where cars are forbidden. The longest highway is nearly 400 miles (640 km) long, while the shortest is about three-quarters of a mile (about 1.2 km). Some roads are unsigned highways, lacking signage to indicate their maintenance by MDOT; these may be remnants of highways that are still under state control whose designations were decommissioned or roadway segments left over from realignment projects.

Predecessors to today's modern highways include the foot trails used by Native Americans in the time before European settlement. Shortly after the creation of the Michigan Territory in 1805, the new government established the first road districts. The federal government aided in the construction of roads to connect population centers in the territory. At the time, road construction was under the control of the township and county governments. The state government was briefly involved in roads until prohibited by a new constitution in 1850. Private companies constructed plank roads and charged tolls. Local township roads were financed and constructed through a statute labor system that required landowners to make improvements in lieu of taxes. Countywide coordination of road planning, construction and maintenance was enacted in the late 19th century.

In the early 20th century, the constitutional prohibition on state involvement in roads was removed. The Michigan State Highway Department (MSHD) was created in 1905, and the department paid counties and townships to improve roads to state standards. On May 13, 1913, the State Reward Trunk Line Highways Act was passed, creating the State Trunkline Highway System. The MSHD assigned internal highway numbers to roads in the system, and in 1919, the numbers were signposted along the roads and marked on maps. The US Highway System was created in 1926, and highways in Michigan were renumbered to account for the new designations. Legislation in the 1930s consolidated control of the state trunklines in the state highway department. During the 1940s, the first freeways were built in Michigan. With the introduction of the Interstate Highway system in the 1950s, the state aborted an effort to build the Michigan Turnpike, a tolled freeway in the southeast corner of the LP. Construction on Michigan's Interstates started in the latter part of that decade and continued until 1992. During that period, several freeways were canceled in the 1960s and 1970s, while others were delayed or modified over environmental and political concerns. Since 1992, few additional freeways have been built, and in the early years of the 21st century, projects are underway to bypass cities with new highways.

== Numbering ==
=== Usage ===
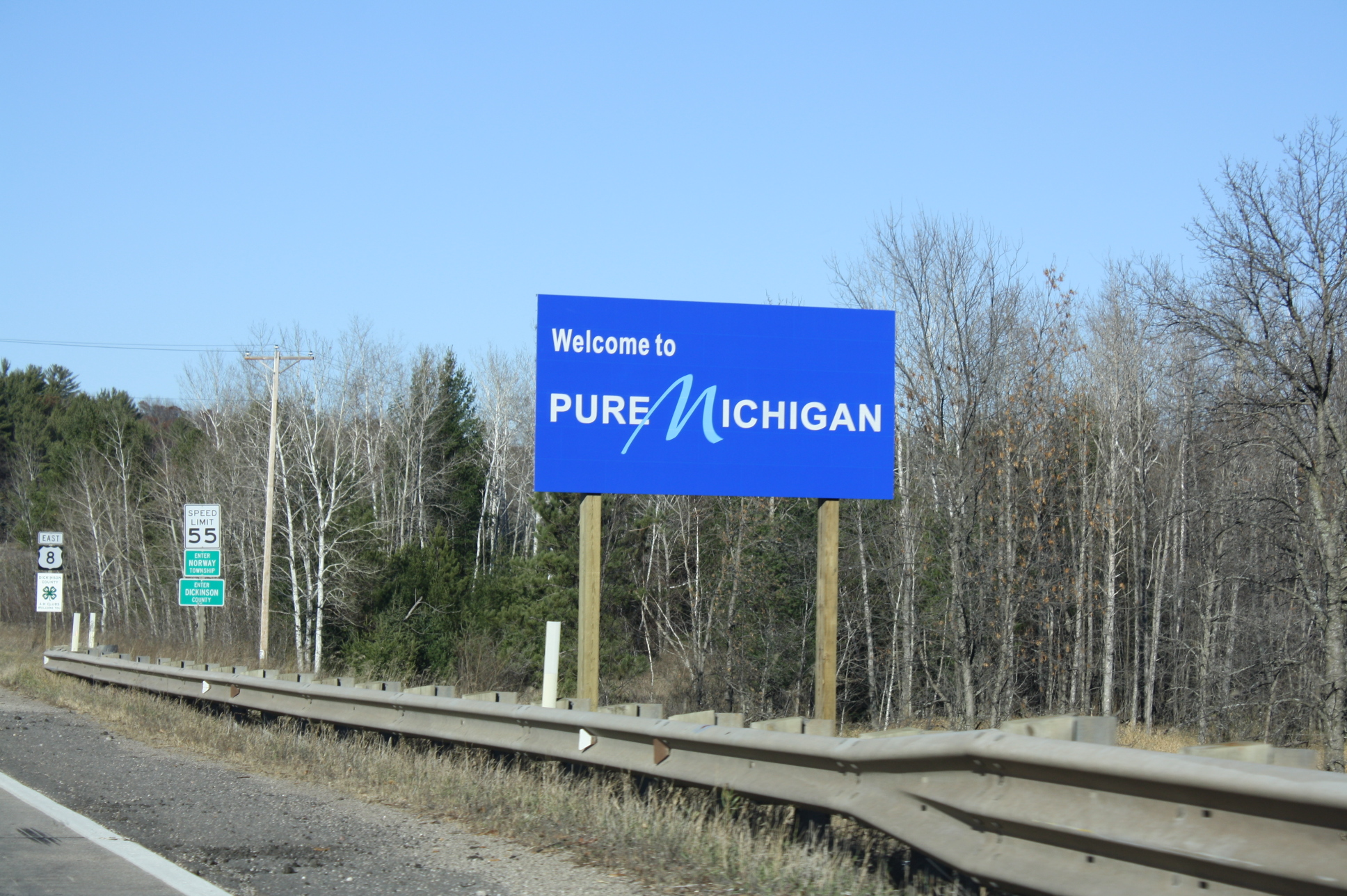
Welcome sign along US 8

The letter M in the state highway numbers is an integral part of the designation and included on the diamond-shaped reassurance markers posted alongside the highways. The state's highways are referred to using an M-n syntax as opposed to Route n or Highway n, which are common elsewhere. This usage dates from 1919, when Michigan's state trunklines were first signed along the roadways, and continues to this day in official and unofficial contexts. Michigan is one of only two states following this syntax, the other one being Kansas.

Although M-n outside of Michigan could conceivably refer to other state, provincial, local, or national highways, local usage in those areas does not mimic the Michigan usage in most cases. In countries like the United Kingdom, M refers to motorways, analogous to freeways in the United States, whereas M-numbered designations in Michigan simply indicate state trunklines in general and may exist on any type of highway. M-numbered trunklines are designated along a variety of roads, including eight-lane freeways in urban areas, four-lane rural freeways and expressways, principal arterial highways, and two-lane highways in remote rural areas. The system also includes M-185 on Mackinac Island, a non-motorized road restricted to bicycles, horse-drawn carriages and pedestrians.

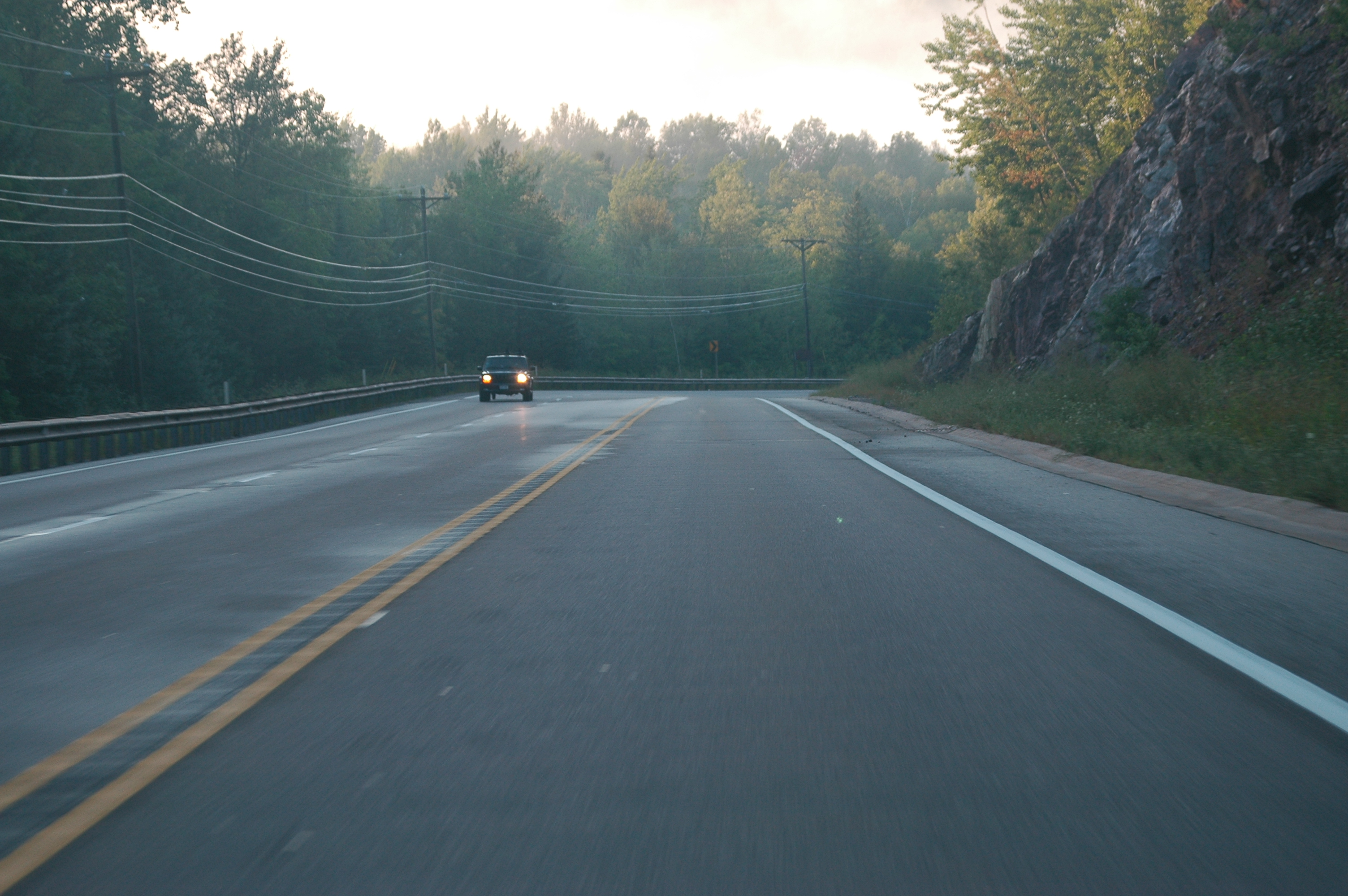
M-553 approaching Glass' Curve south of Marquette

The highest numbers used for highway designations include M-553 in the UP and Interstate 696 (I-696) running along the northern Detroit suburbs. The lowest numbers in use are M-1 along Woodward Avenue in the Detroit area and US Highway 2 (US 2) across the UP. Most M-numbered trunkline designations are in the low 200s or under, but some have been designated in the low 300s. MDOT has not assigned a designation outside the Interstate System in the 400s at this time. No discernible pattern exists in Michigan's numbering system, although most of the M-numbered routes lower than 15 are typically located in or around the major cities of Detroit and Grand Rapids.

=== Numerical duplication ===
Unlike some other states, there are no formal rules prohibiting the usage of the same route number under different systems. Motorists using Michigan's highways may encounter I-75 and M-75, as well as both US 8 and M-8. Many of the state's US Highways were assigned numbers duplicating those of state trunklines when the US Highway System was created in 1926. The introduction of the Interstate Highway System in the late 1950s further complicated the situation, as each mainline Interstate designation has an unrelated M-n trunkline counterpart elsewhere in the state.

Many former US Highways in Michigan have left an M-numbered highway with the same number as a relic of their existence. For example, M-27 runs along a portion of former US 27. In addition, there are two occurrences of original M-numbered state routes which became US Highways with the same designations: all of M-16 became US 16 and most of M-10 from Detroit to Saginaw was assumed into the route of US 10 in 1926. In fact, each iteration of M-10 has existed in whole or part along a former or future alignment of US 10.

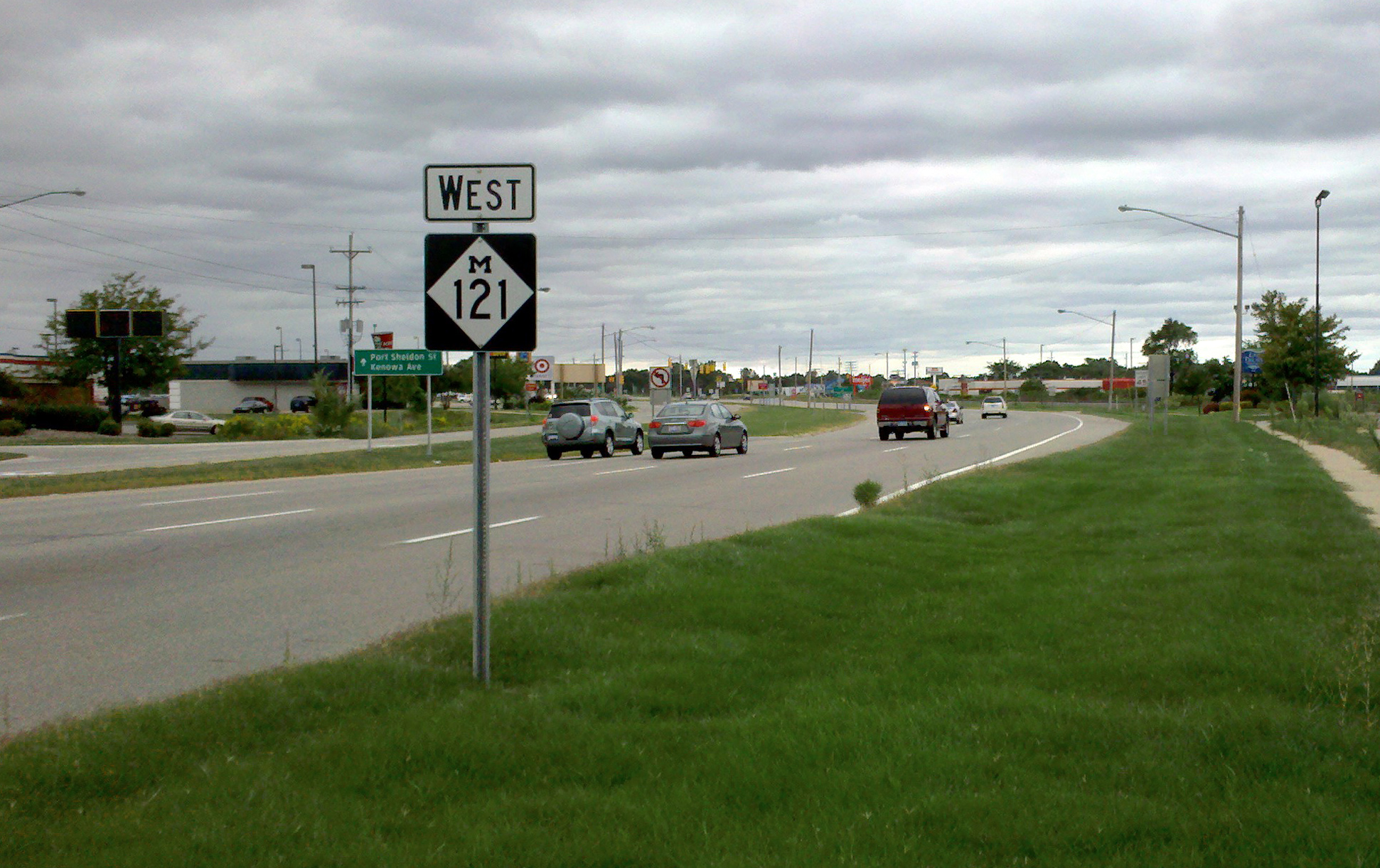
M-121 in Jenison

There are also instances of M-numbered state highways that once existed as extensions of US Highways. M-25 was originally an extension of US 25 before the latter was decommissioned in Michigan, and M-24 was once an extension of US 24 before routing changes separated the two highways. M-131 was an extension of US 131 until US 131 was routed onto the former M-131. There was also once an M-112 that served as an alternate routing for US 112 (both have since been changed to I-94 and US 12, respectively).

== Highway systems ==
There are four types of highways maintained by MDOT as part of the overall State Trunkline Highway System. In addition, there are systems of roads maintained by the federal government and local counties. There are frequent overlaps between designations when different types of highways share the same stretch of pavement in concurrencies. As just one example of the phenomenon, the freeway between Flint and Standish carries both the I-75 and US 23 designations for around 75 miles (121 km).

=== State Trunkline Highways ===
Markers for BL I-196 (left), and Bus. M-60 (right)

The State Trunkline Highway System comprises four types of highways: Michigan's portions of the Interstate Highway System and United States Numbered Highway System (US Highways), and the regular state trunklines; the fourth type, special routes, are variations of the other three types of highway, and are distinguished by special plates placed above the route marker. The plates indicate the routes as business or connector routes. Business loops and spurs of the Interstate Highway System use a special green version of the standard Interstate marker which places the word "Business" at the top where "Interstate" would otherwise appears. These business loops and spurs connect downtown districts to main highways after realignments and bypasses have routed the main highway out of the downtown area. Another category, connector routes, serve to connect two highways as their names suggest; most of these connectors are unsigned. The highways names for special routes are formulated by prefacing the parent highway with the type of special route. The full names are commonly abbreviated like other highways: Business Loop Interstate 196 (BL I-196), Business M-60 (Bus. M-60) or Connector M-44 (Conn. M-44). As of 2010 there are 9,669 miles (15,561 km) of state trunklines in Michigan, making up about eight percent of the state's roadways. Of that mileage, some 4,415 miles (7,105 km) of state-maintained highways are included in the National Highway System, which are highways selected for their importance to the country's economy, defense, and mobility. The state trunkline highways in Michigan carry approximately 51 percent of the state's traffic, as of 2007.

The highways in the system range in length from the unsigned Business Spur Interstate 375 (BS I-375) at 0.170 miles (0.274 km) and signed M-212 at 0.732 miles (1.178 km) to I-75 at 395.40 miles (636.33 km). Some trunklines in Michigan are maintained by MDOT but bear no signage along the route to indicate so. These unsigned trunklines are mostly segments of former highway designations that have been moved or decommissioned. They remain under state control until their respective city or county accepts jurisdiction of the roadway from the state.

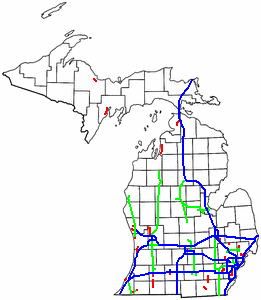
Interstate Highways Other freeways Miscellaneous expressways (Note: Not all freeways and expressways are shown in this image; as of March 28, 2006.)

Highways in the state maintained by MDOT range from two-lane rural highways up to 12-lane freeways. In addition to the Interstates, other trunklines are built to freeway standards. Sections of US 10, US 23, US 31, US 127 and US 131 have been upgraded to freeway standards. All or part of several state trunklines are also freeways. In the Metro Detroit area, M-5, M-8 (Davison Freeway), M-10 (Lodge Freeway), M-14, M-39 (Southfield Freeway), M-53 (Van Dyke Freeway), and M-59 have such sections. In the rest of the state, M-6 near Grand Rapids, Conn. M-13 near Bay City, M-47 near Midland, M-60 near Jackson, and Bus. US 131 near Kalamazoo are also freeways, for all or part of their respective lengths. Sections of US 12, M-20, M-37, M-46, M-55, M-66 and US 223 have been routed to run concurrently with other freeways as well.

As of January 2013, there are three sources of revenue that contribute to the Michigan Transportation Fund (MTF): fuel excise taxes, vehicle registration fees and federal aid. Michigan levies an excise tax of 18.7 cents per gallon on gasoline and 15 cents per gallon on diesel fuel to generate approximately $955 million in revenue per year. Vehicle registrations account for about $868 million while federal aid from federal fuel taxes accounts for the last third of funding in Michigan. Money from the MTF is distributed between MDOT, county road commissions, city or village street departments and local public transit agencies. For fiscal year 2013, MDOT has budgeted approximately $1.2 billion on the highway system, including $273.4 million in routine maintenance. The remainder financed major projects in terms of planning, right-of-way acquisition or construction. In terms of winter maintenance, MDOT classifies all state highways into two priority levels for snow removal, authorizing overtime to clear some highways in the state.

=== County roads and other systems ===
Markers for C-66 (left), and CR 492 (right)

MDOT assigns the numbers for a parallel system of county-designated highways in the state; the numbers are assigned in a grid system by the department. These highways, while signed from connecting trunklines and shown on the official MDOT map, are maintained by the various counties. They were started in 1970 as a supplement to the main trunkline system and carry a letter-number combination on the national standard pentagon-shaped marker in blue and yellow. The letter component of the name corresponds to a zone of the state; zones A–F are in the Lower Peninsula while G and H are in the Upper Peninsula. The numbers correspond to a numbered grid within each lettered zone. Other county systems are designated and maintained in each of the 83 counties, and signage and numbering practices vary. (Note: Counties like Marquette use the older black and white square marker, while others like Gogebic use the newer pentagon marker. Keweenaw County does not use county road numbers or markers, and Delta County uses a green and white sign for some county roads.) The state's 533 incorporated cities and villages also maintain their own street networks, but townships in the state have no jurisdiction over roads.

Markers for Federal Forest Highway 16, the Great Lakes Circle Tour, and a Pure Michigan Byway

The U.S. Forest Service and Federal Highway Administration designate Federal Forest Highways providing access to the handful of National Forests in the state. In addition, Michigan participates in the Great Lakes Circle Tour program, signing tours along the state-maintained highway closest to Michigan's Great Lakes shorelines. The Michigan Heritage Route System was created in 1993 to highlight trunklines with historic, recreational or scenic qualities; the name was changed to Pure Michigan Byway on December 30, 2014.

== History ==
=== 19th century ===
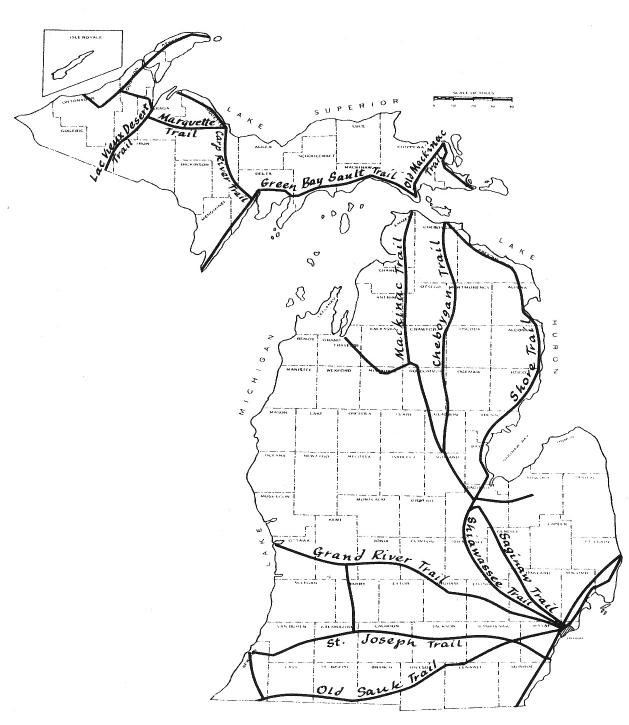
Map of the pre-statehood Indian trails

The history of the highway system in Michigan dates back to the old Native American trails that crossed the state. These trails were pathways no wider than approximately 12–18 inches (30–46 cm), permitting single-file traffic. Many of the modern highways in the state follow the path of these old trails, including the Great Trail from Fort Pitt to Fort Detroit which is now US 24 from Detroit to Toledo, Ohio. This trail connected with Braddock's Road which led to the Atlantic Coast.

The Michigan Territory was established in 1805, and the territorial governor established the first road districts. The districts built farm-to-market roads to serve the agricultural needs of the farming population of the area at the time; they connected farmers with markets in their local communities. The local streets in the individual communities were the responsibility of those communities. At the same time, Detroit created 120-foot-wide (37 m) rights-of-way for the five great avenues in the city following a fire.

Outside of Detroit, the situation was quite different. Maps of the territory were printed with the words "interminable swamp" across the interior until 1839. Reports of the first explorers and government surveyors crossing the future state only seemed to confirm the assessment that Michigan land was unsuitable for agriculture or other productive activities. The few roads in the area were impassable for half of the year. The poor quality of the early roads meant that most transportation in the state was by way of the lakes and rivers at first. Commerce was limited to trade to and from Canada.

These roads proved inadequate to the needs of the military during the War of 1812. Territorial Governor Lewis Cass lobbied the federal government for road construction funding to bolster defensive needs as well as aid in settlement of the territory. Military roads debuted in 1816 with the construction of the Detroit–Fort Meigs Road to Toledo as a response to transportation needs. More roads were built with Congressional appropriations in the 1820s and 1830s connecting Detroit to Port Huron, Saginaw, Grand Rapids and Chicago.

Townships were given authority to construct roads under the supervision of county commissioners in 1817. This supervision was difficult since in one case, one county (Note: What is today's Mackinac County was once called Michilimackinac County; it encompassed everything north of the central LP in the 1830s.) covered all of the Upper Peninsula and several of today's counties in the Lower Peninsula. Direct supervision over construction was granted to the townships in 1827, and federal involvement in road building ended with the 1837 grant of statehood.

The first state constitution encouraged state involvement in internal improvements like roads. The Panic of 1837 devastated the new state's efforts, and the government defaulted on bond payments. Private construction companies built roads starting in 1844 to fill the void in long-distance road construction left by the departure of the federal government. The first roads were corduroy roads; to build these, logs of all sizes were placed across the road. The gaps between the logs were filled in with smaller logs or earth. In swampy or marshy areas, brush was laid down first for drainage. In time, the logs would rot, leaving large gaps to the roadway that would catch wagon wheels or draft animal feet. Later, roads were built with oak planks. The plank road companies had to be chartered by the state after passage of legislation in 1848. According to the plank road law, these companies had to build their roads to a set of minimum specifications. These specifications included 2–4 rods (33–66 ft; 10–20 m) in total width, a road surface 16 feet (4.9 m) wide with at least 8 feet (2.4 m) made of 3-inch (8 cm) planks. Later amendments to the law allowed the companies to substitute gravel for the planks. Starting with the enactment of a new state constitution in 1850, the state was prohibited from being "a part to, or interested in, any work of internal improvement"; this provision ended the state government's involvement in Michigan's roads.

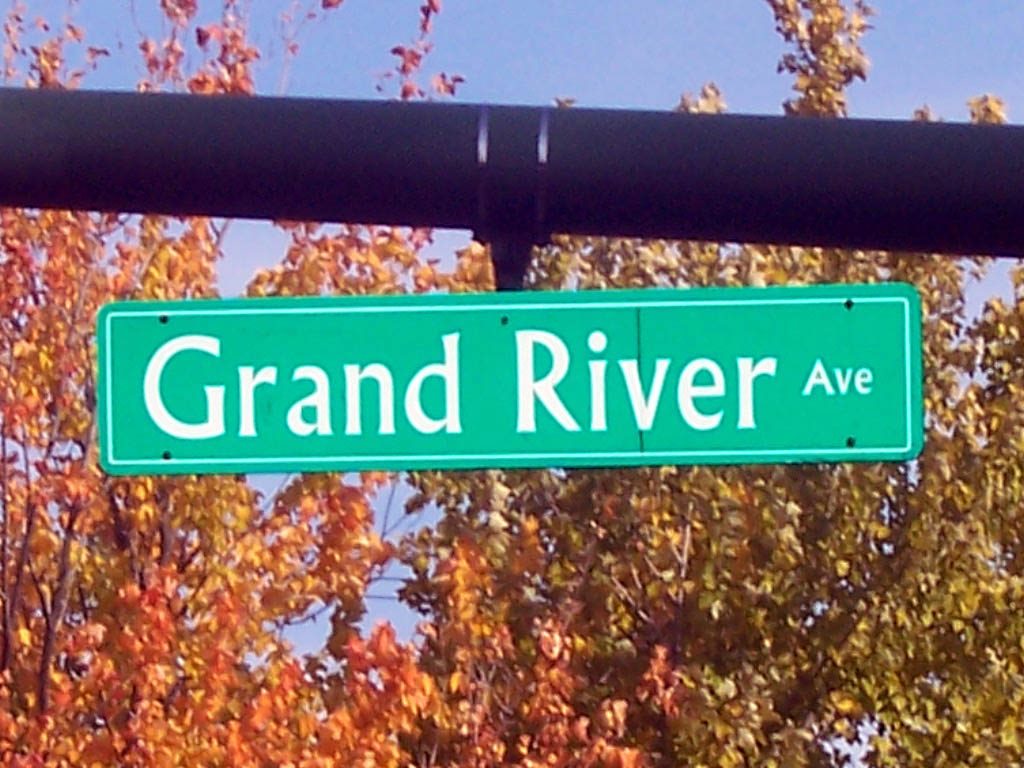
Grand River Avenue, once a part of M-16 and later US 16, was originally an Indian trail converted as a plank road before becoming a state highway.

The early plank roads were funded by tolls; these fares were collected at turnstiles every few miles along the roads, at rates of $0.02/mile for wagons pulled by two animals (equivalent to $0.76 in 2024). As time passed, the planks would warp and rot. The tolls were insufficient to fund the maintenance necessary to keep the roads in good repair. Even Mark Twain remarked, "The road could not have been bad if some unconscionable scoundrel had not now and then dropped a plank across it," after a trip to Grand Rapids. The planks were removed over time and replaced with gravel roads. The longest chartered road was a distance of 220 miles (350 km) from Zilwaukee to Mackinaw City by way of Traverse City; the shortest was a mile (1.6 km) near Sault Ste. Marie.

Townships continued to maintain and build local roads using the "statute labor system". An able-bodied man residing in a local road district was expected to pay his road taxes by performing 30 days of labor on the roads in his district. If he was unable to work off the tax, a rate of $0.625/day was assessed (equivalent to $23.62 in 2024). This road maintenance was performed under the guidance of the township road overseer, a separate elected township official, according to the wishes of his constituents, often without any county-level planning or coordination. Often the "improved roads" were in worse condition than unimproved roads due to the amateur nature of the maintenance.

An early form of federal aid contributed to the road network in the state starting in the 1850s. Congress granted certain forest and swamp lands to the state in 1850. A stipulation on the grant stated that the proceeds from the lands would be used to reclaim them for use. The Michigan Legislature established several roads to be built by contractors, paid with the proceeds from the sale of the land adjoining the roads, or with land itself. Despite these efforts, only 1,179 miles (1,897 km) of the 5,082 miles (8,179 km) of plank roads authorized by the state were ever built by 89 of the 202 chartered plank road companies.

The tax system was partially reformed in 1881, allowing for direct payment of road taxes instead of relying totally on the statute-labor system. The first road district larger than the township level was created in Bay County in 1883 under Public Act 278. This road district encompassed eight townships and provided for better coordination and planning of road construction. Other county systems were created in 1893 with passage of legislation which allowed other counties to follow the lead of Bay County. By 1900, the plank roads were generally abandoned. While a few were still in good repair, most consisted of rotting logs with intermittent patches of gravel. Toll houses were empty shacks, and the ditches were clogged with duck ponds. Only 23 of the original 202 plank roads chartered by the state were still in operation.

The Good Roads Movement, borne out of the needs of the bicycle craze of the 1880s and 1890s, turned its attention towards the needs of automobiles at the turn of the century. Horatio S. "Good Roads" Earle, a state senator from Detroit, was elected national president of the League of American Wheelmen in 1901. Earle worked on a committee report that called for the removal of the prohibition on road improvements from the state constitution. That report also recommended the creation of a commission and system for state highways.

=== Early 20th century ===
The first state road agency, the Michigan State Highway Department (MSHD), was created on July 1, 1905. At first the department administered rewards to the counties and townships for building roads to state minimum specifications. In 1905, there were 68,000 miles (110,000 km) of roads in Michigan. Of these roads, only 7,700 miles (12,000 km) were improved with gravel and 245 miles (394 km) were macadam. The state's statute labor system was abolished in 1907. Instead, a property tax system was instituted with the funding only for permanent improvements, not maintenance. Rural farmers opposed the state's efforts, and even Henry Ford was against the idea of reforming road construction and maintenance. In response to this opposition, the department's work was decentralized; standards for road improvement came from the state, but work was carried out by the townships and counties. The nation's first mile of concrete roadway was laid along Woodward Avenue in 1909 between Six Mile and Seven Mile roads in Detroit; this section of street was 17 feet 8 inches (5.38 m) wide and cost $14,000 (equivalent to $340,000 in 2023).

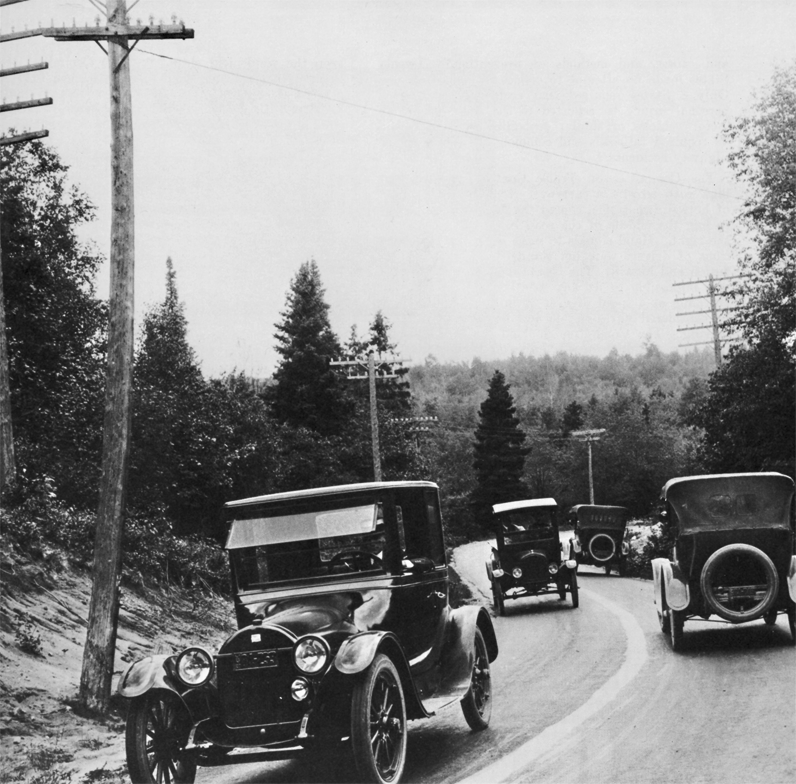
Dead Man's Curve along the Marquette–Negaunee Road shown in 1917 with its hand-painted centerline, the first in the nation

Passage of the State Reward Trunk Line Highways Act on May 13, 1913, provided for 3,000 miles (4,828 km) of roadways in a state-financed system. The system comprised 10 divisions, several of which had associated branches, that ran along existing roads throughout the state. After the creation of the system, the Huron Shore Road Association scheduled a Road Bee Day on June 13, 1913; some 5,000 men, 200 women, 3,000 teams of horses and 750 automobiles participated in the effort that improved 200 miles (320 km) of roads in the state. Further legislation at the time allowed for special assessment taxing districts for road improvements, taxation of automobiles based on weight and horsepower, and tree-planting along highway roadsides. Congress passed the Federal Aid Road Act of 1916, and the state passed a constitutional amendment in 1917 to qualify for federal aid with state funding matches.

The first centerline was painted on a state highway in 1917 along the Marquette–Negaunee Road which was designated Trunkline 15, now County Road 492 in Marquette County. (Note: The first centerline was invented in 1911 in Wayne County by Edward N. Hines.) Winter maintenance started during World War I to keep 590 miles (950 km) of strategic highways clear; some $13,200 (equivalent to $177,700 in 2023) was appropriated with partial funding from the War Loan Board.

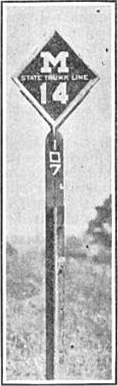
Milemarker used in 1922 for M-14

In 1919, the legislature passed the Aldrich Act; combined with the approval of the Bond Issue Act during an election that April, the MSHD was authorized to assume responsibility over the roadways that composed the State Trunkline Highway System. The state highway commissioner was required to sign the state trunkline highways, and Michigan became the second state after Wisconsin to do so. Alan Williams, Ionia County engineer, helped to design the diamond marker used to sign the highways; he is also known for placing a picnic table alongside US 16 (Grand River Avenue) in 1929 south of Saranac, considered the first in the country. Other sources say that the first roadside park in the country was created by Herbert Larson near what is now US 2 near Iron River in 1919–20. The first crows nest traffic tower in the US was installed at the intersection of Woodward and Michigan avenues in Detroit on October 9, 1917. The tower elevated a police officer above the center of the intersection to direct traffic before it was replaced in October 1920 with the world's first four-way traffic light.

While Michigan was the second state to post route designations along its highway system in 1919, Michigan actually began assigning internal trunkline designations for internal inventory purposes as early as 1913. From 1918 to 1926, only the M-numbered highway designations existed on state highways throughout Michigan, while the creation of the US Highway System in 1926 caused several existing designations to be either reassigned or retired altogether. Public Act 131 of 1931 allowed the MSHD to take control over the city and village streets that carried state highways through cities and villages in the state. The 1932 McNitt Act consolidated all of the township-controlled roads into 83 county road commissions. On May 4, 1935, the state opened the first highway welcome center next to US 12 in New Buffalo near the Indiana state line; Michigan was the first state in the country to do so at the time.

=== Mid-20th century ===
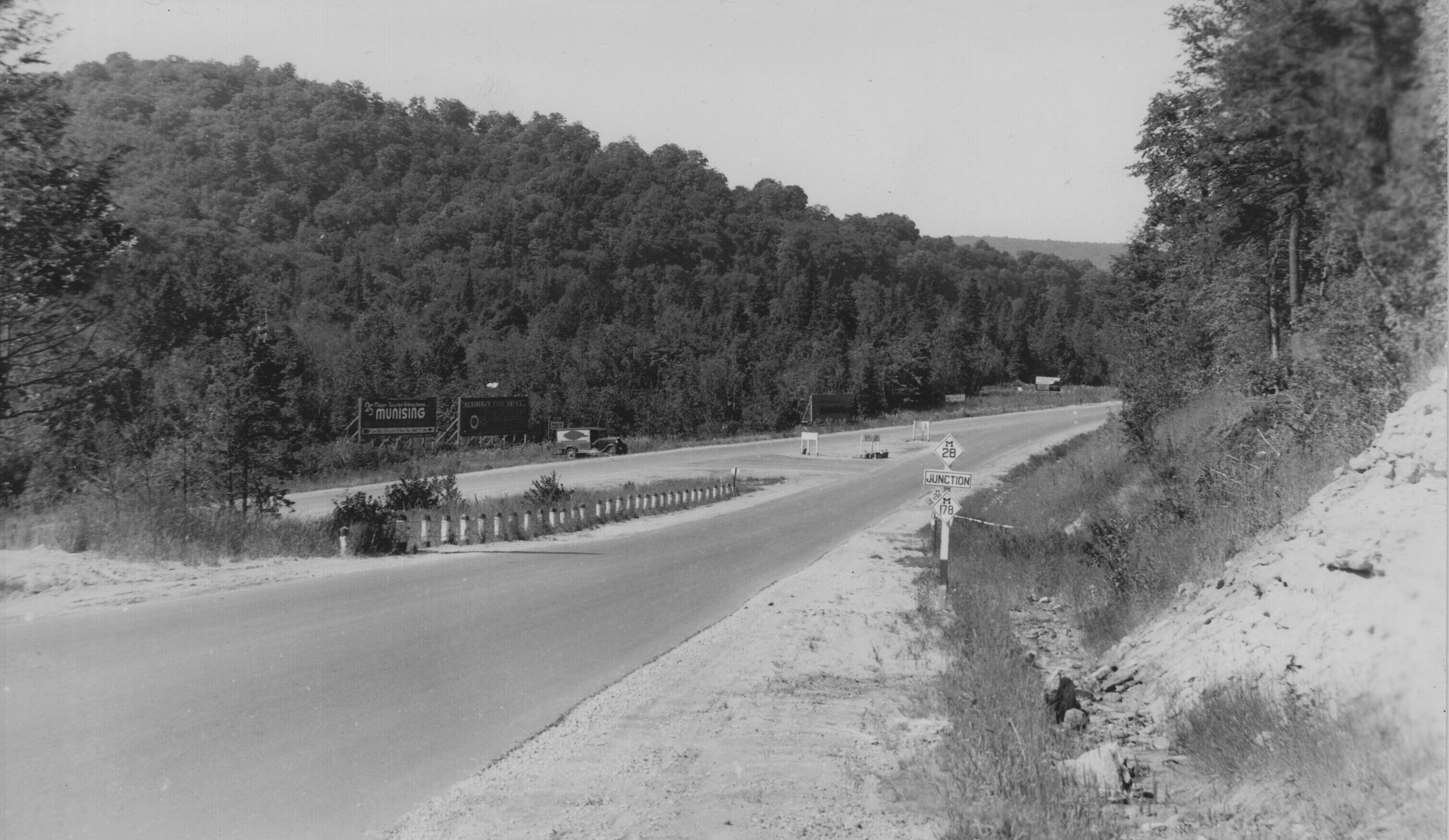
Junction between M-28 and M-178 south of Munising before 1941

The state passed legislation in 1941 that authorized the creation of limited-access roadways; the MSHD could prohibit access to a state trunkline from the adjacent properties. Around the same time, single-digit highways like M-9 were renumbered to set aside those numbers for future freeways in the state. During World War II, the Willow Run Expressway, the Detroit Industrial Expressway and the Davison Freeway were built, ushering in the beginnings of the state's freeway system. These highway improvements were financed by the Defense Highway Act of 1941 to aid in national defense. After the war, the MSHD and the Good Roads Federation studied the highway needs of the state. Their study reported that road maintenance and improvement deteriorated since the Great Depression. It also stated that funding needed to be increased to deal with pressures from traffic increases after the war.

Public Act 51 of 1951 amended and clarified the current system of jurisdiction over roads in the state. The existing tri-level system was maintained, splitting road jurisdiction between the state, counties and cities, as well as subdividing each level into several classifications. Further legislation redefined the exact distribution, but Act 51 set up a system to distribute road funding from gas taxes from a single funding source, currently the Michigan Transportation Fund. Funding was increased during the 1950s as the fuel taxes were increased. Whereas those revenues during the war dropped to levels barely sufficient to keep existing highways in usable condition, they were increased during the following decade to deal with increasing traffic. The state highway department was also authorized to sell bonds to provide funding for the proposed road improvements.

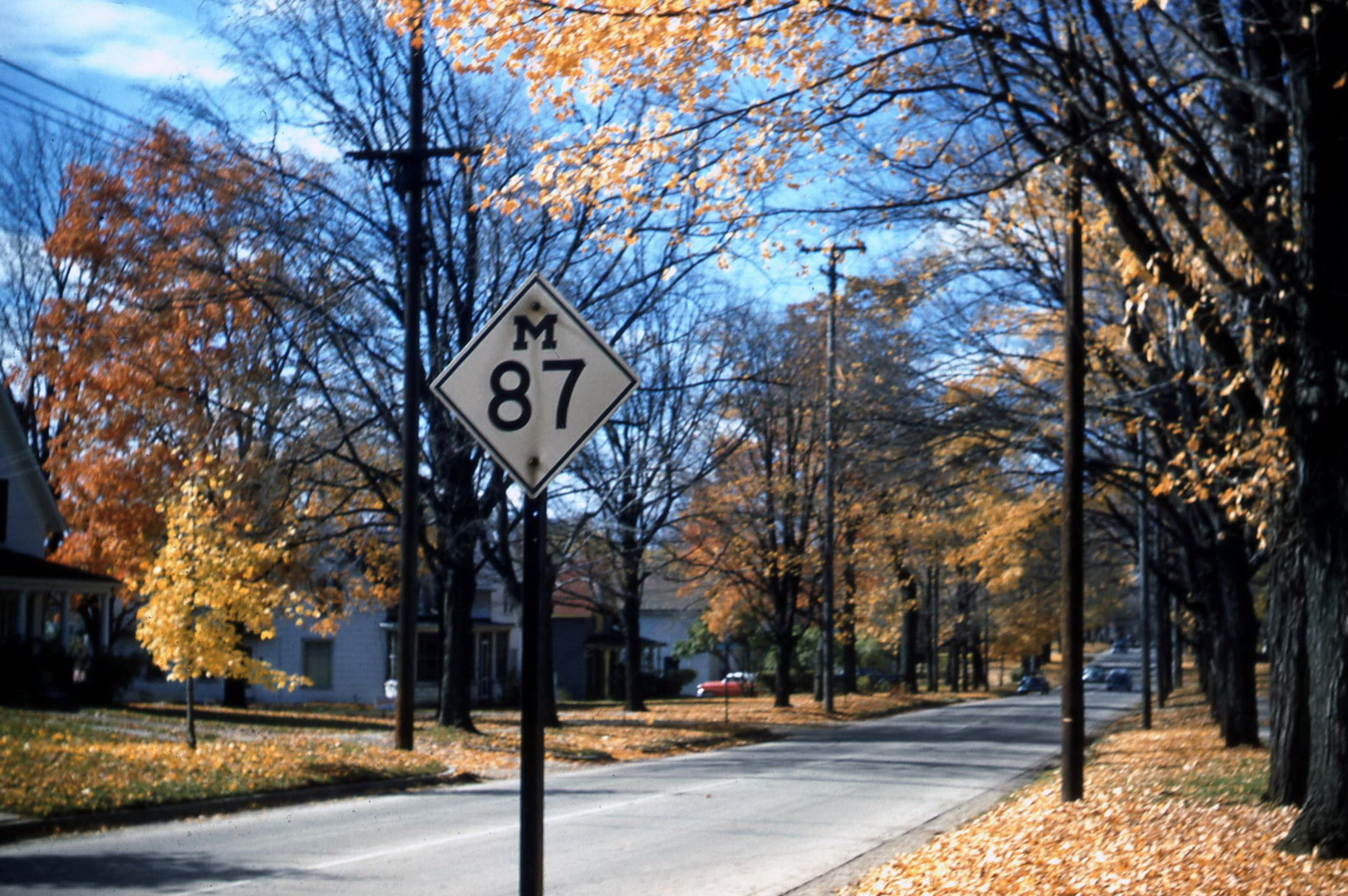
M-87 on November 1, 1956

The Michigan Turnpike Authority (MTA), an agency created in 1951, proposed the construction of a toll freeway to run north–south in the state. The original termini for the Michigan Turnpike were Bridgeport and Rockwood. The state highway commissioner at the time, Charles Ziegler, distrusted a separate agency dealing with statewide road building at the time and worked to stall progress on any proposed turnpikes. He also opposed the idea because the state had three freeways under planning or construction. Ziegler and the MSHD announced plans for a full freeway to run north through the Lower Peninsula and continue across to the Upper Peninsula. This announcement derailed the efforts to build the Michigan Turnpike. The Interstate Highway System was authorized by the Federal Aid Highway Act of 1956, and the state had already designed several freeways for its portion of that system. Seizing the opportunity brought by a 1957 state law, the department sold $700 million in bonds (equivalent to $5.81 billion in 2023) in the late 1950s and early 1960s to finance land purchases and construction of the new freeways. The first Interstate Highway in the state was signposted in October 1959 when I-75 signs were first installed along the Detroit–Toledo Expressway. These signs replaced US 24A signage in the Monroe area, after the state received final approval for the numbering system to be used in the state. Michigan was the first state to complete a border-to-border Interstate Highway in 1960 with the completion of I-94. The last gravel state highway was paved in the early 1960s as well; bids were let in March 1962 to finish paving M-48 in Chippewa County.

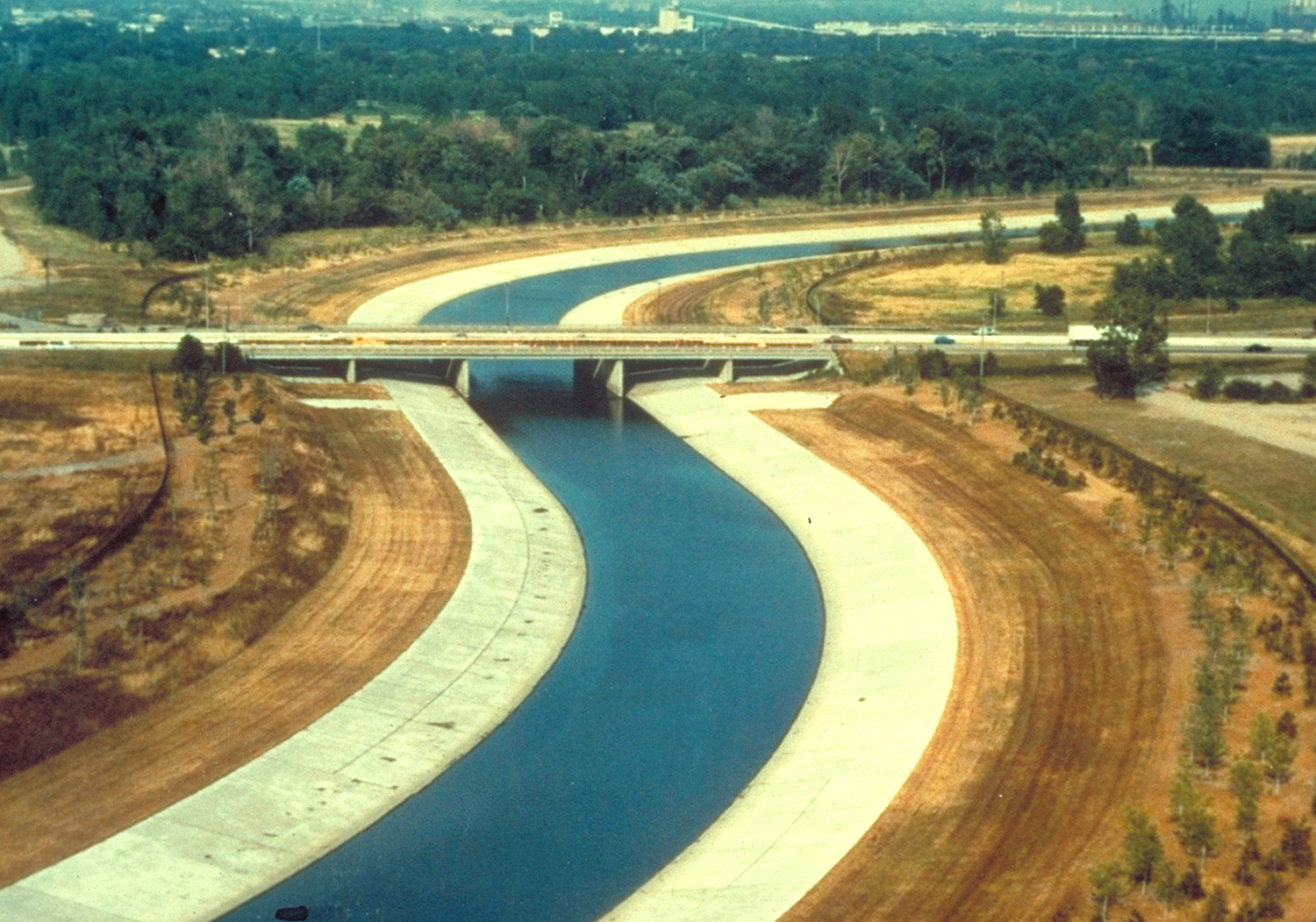
M-39 bridge over the River Rouge in Dearborn

The original goal of Michigan's freeways was to connect every city with a population of more than 50,000 people with a network of roads that would accommodate traffic at 70 mph (110 km/h). Following the start of these highway improvements, the MSHD adopted a policy to allow traffic to use the state's trunklines every day of the year regardless of the weather. The state also invested in improving non-freeway roads in the highway system; better materials and construction methods were used to improve safety and traffic flow throughout the state.

The post-war years were also a period of major bridge building in the state. The Mackinac Bridge opened on November 1, 1957, the Portage Lake Lift Bridge, the largest double-deck lift bridge was completed in August 1959, and the International Bridge opened across the St. Marys River three years later on October 31, 1962. The State Highway Department started erecting mileposts along the Interstates in 1963, and later expanded the practice to other freeways and used the mileages to number the interchanges along I-94.

=== Late 20th century ===
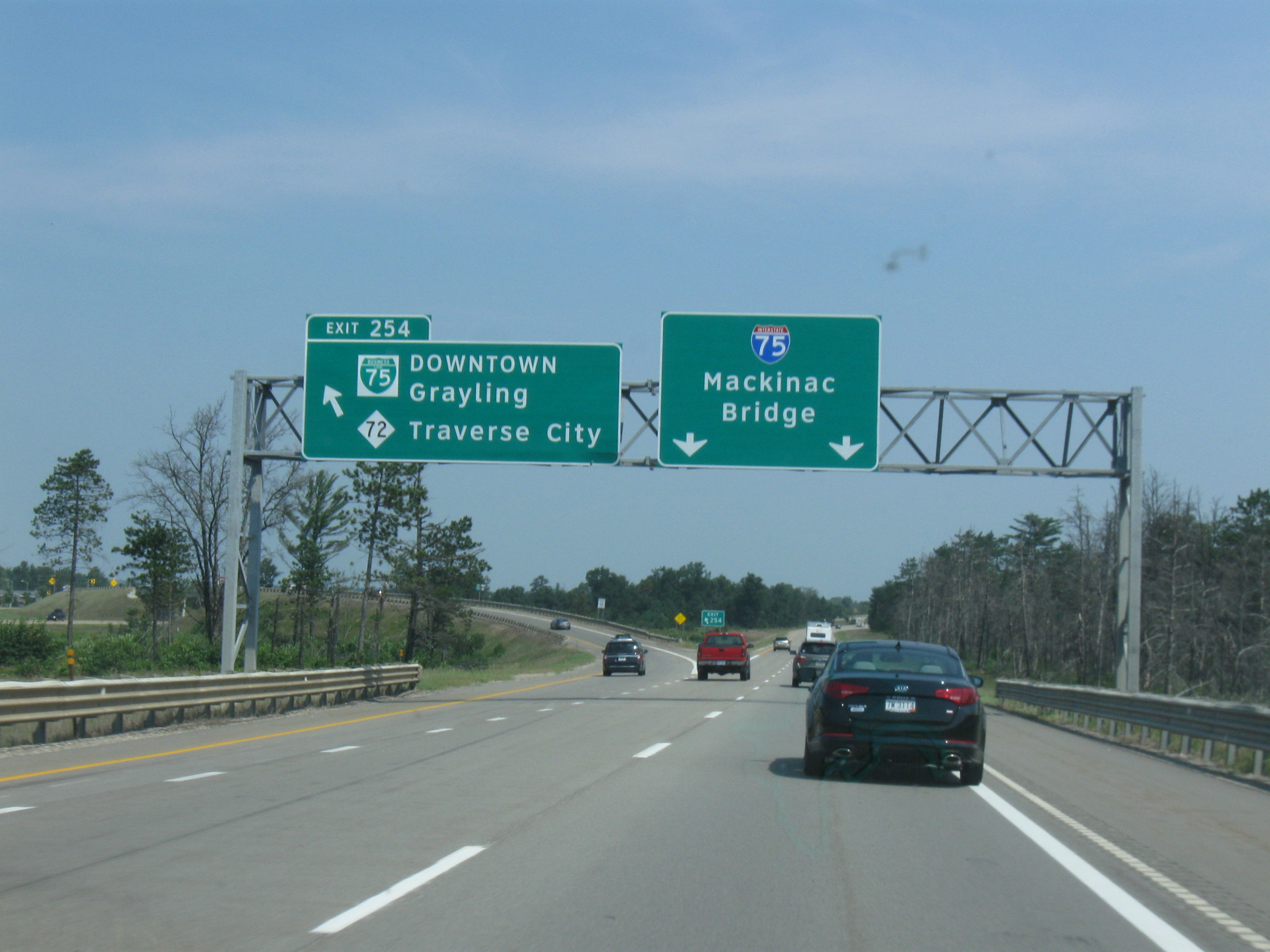
Exit 254 on I-75 south of Grayling

Freeway construction continued through the 1970s. On April 6, 1972, the New Buffalo Welcome Center was relocated from its previous location next to US 12 to one adjacent to I-94. Later that year, the state switched paint colors for its centerlines; yellow was used for the lines separating directions of travel and white for lines separating lanes traveling in the same direction. Also in 1972, a gas tax increase was passed to facilitate US and state highway improvement projects. The final section of I-75 between Alger and Roscommon was opened on November 1, 1973, in a dedication by Governor William G. Milliken, completing the longest highway in the state. In 1974, the state implemented mileage-based exit numbers along the remaining Interstates in Michigan. By late 1977, the state highway department shifted its focus from construction of new highways to improvements of the existing system.

During the 1960s and 1970s, various freeway projects in the Detroit area were cancelled or scaled back in scope. The route of I-96 along Grand River Avenue was cancelled in response to freeway revolts in the city, and a new routing along the C&O Railroad right-of-way in Livonia was used instead. Plans to transfer the Davison Freeway in the 1970s to state control and extend it west to I-96 (Jeffries Freeway) and east to a Van Dyke Freeway (extended M-53) were dropped. Another freeway project near Lansing, the Van Atta Connector, was proposed in 1961 to provide an eastern freeway beltway around East Lansing, but by 1981 the highway's impact to neighboring elementary schools along with larger economic impacts led to the project's cancellation.

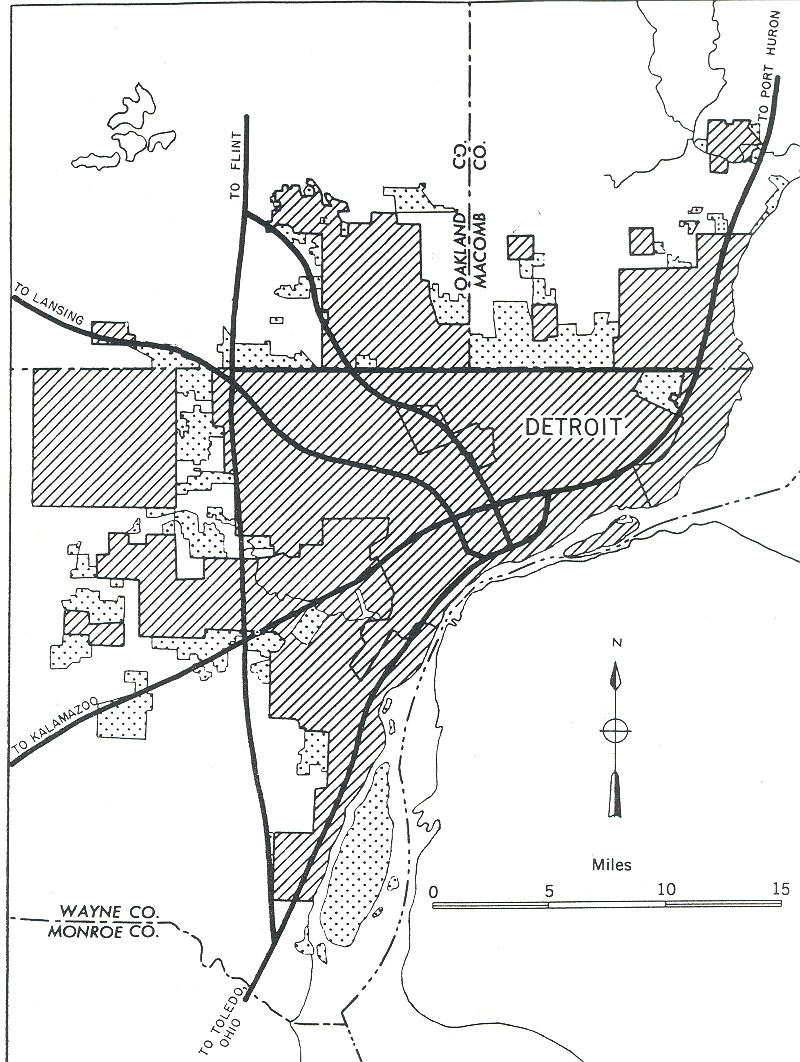
Planning map for the Detroit area freeways from 1955

The Michigan Highway Commission canceled the northern section of I-275 on January 26, 1977, after it spent $1.6 million (equivalent to $6.68 million in 2023) the year before purchasing land for the roadway. This northern section was not planned as an Interstate Highway at that time, bearing the designation M-275 instead. Opposition to construction came from various citizen's groups, different levels of local government, and both The Detroit News and Detroit Free Press. The Detroit City Council, led by then-Chairman Carl Levin, opposed the plan as well. Levin said at the time, "At last I think people are waking up to the dangers of more and more expressways. At some point we've got to say enough. And I think we've reached it." The United States Department of the Interior reviewed the state's environmental impact study of the project and stated the project "will cause irreparable damages on recreation lands, wetlands, surface waters and wildlife habitat." The total project to link Farmington Hills with Davisburg with the 24-mile (39 km) freeway would have cost $69.5 million (equivalent to $273 million in 2023) and saved drivers an estimated eight minutes off travel time around the city of Detroit. Other freeway projects cancelled during the 1970s included an extension of the US 131 freeway northward to Petoskey, an extension of the US 23 freeway from Standish to Alpena, and a freeway running across the southern Lower Peninsula toward Chicago. These ventures, along with the I-275 extension, were dropped over concerns related to rising construction costs, the environment and the Arab Oil Embargo. Even with these cancelled highways, several proposals were left to be completed.

At the end of the 1970s, MDOT took part in a FHWA-backed initiative called the Positive Guidance Demonstration Project, and the two agencies audited signage practices in the vicinity of the I-96/M-37 and I-296/US 131 interchange in Walker near Grand Rapids. MDOT determined that usage of the I-296 designation was "a potential source of confusion for motorists." FHWA agreed with the department's proposal to eliminate all signage and public map references to the designation in April 1979. MDOT then received permission from the American Association of State Highway and Transportation Officials (AASHTO) on October 13, and from the FHWA on December 3, 1979, on the condition that MDOT would continue to use the designation on official documents. The approval explicitly retained the highway in the Interstate system for funding and other purposes. The last state map to show the I-296 designation was published in 1979, as the 1980 map lacks any reference to the designation.

Following this program, the Reflective Systems Unit at MDOT reviewed the state of two- and three-way concurrencies along the highway system in Michigan. They approached the department's Trunkline Numbering Committee and the district traffic and safety engineers on October 19, 1982, for proposals to reduce or eliminate the various overlapping designations to "avoid driver confusion and save funds". When the unit released its final recommendations on March 17, 1983, the memo recommended 19 changes to eliminate various concurrent routings, including the truncation of US 2 to St. Ignace, changes to the routing of US 10, and the removal of US 33 from the state. These changes were implemented October 1983, 1985, and 1986, respectively. Other changes recommended at the time, like the truncation of M-54 to remove it from the wrong-way concurrency with M-83 near Birch Run, has never been implemented.

=== Into the 21st century ===
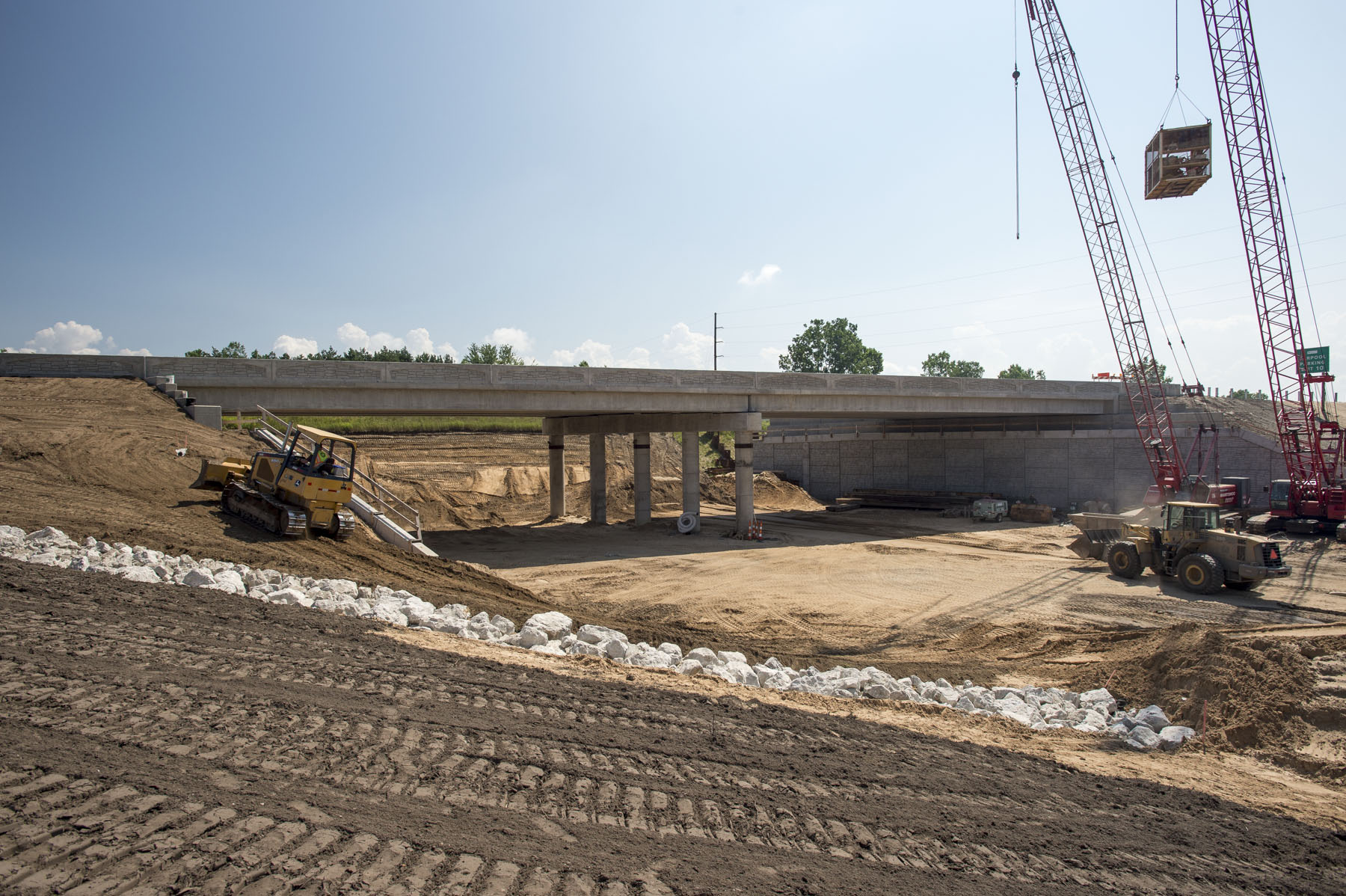
Construction along I-96 for the interchange with M-231 in July 2013

The final section of the controversial I-696 opened at a cost of $436 million (equivalent to $934 million in 2023) on December 15, 1989; the freeway's central segment was delayed over concerns related to its routing through Detroit's northern suburbs. The 1,241-mile (1,997 km) Interstate Highway network in Michigan was completed in 1992 with the last four miles (6.4 km) of I-69 near the Lansing area. Since the completion of these freeways, a handful of major projects have added to the trunkline system and the end of the 20th and the start of the 21st centuries. A bypass of St. Johns along US 27 (now US 127) opened on August 31, 1998. M-6, a southern freeway bypass of Grand Rapids first proposed in the 1960s, was built between 1997 and 2004; that freeway was controversial based on the choice of a minority-owned subcontractor and route location. Bypasses of Cadillac and Manton opened in 2001 and 2003, extending the US 131 freeway northward. The final segment of the M-5 Haggerty Connector opened to traffic on November 1, 2002. Another venture was the construction of a new bridge over the Grand River in Ottawa County for a highway designated M-231; that highway opened in October 2015.

Another project completed the St. Joseph Valley Parkway, a section of US 31 in Berrien County. The original plan for the freeway would have routed US 31 to connect directly into the I-196/US 31 interchange on I-94. Concerns over the habitat of the Mitchell's satyr butterfly meant this routing would need to be redesigned with a set of bridges to cross the habitat unobtrusively in the Blue Creek Fen. In 2001, MDOT began a study of a new design alternative to route the US 31 freeway to connect with I-94 at the BL I-94 interchange just south of the I-196/US 31 interchange. In the interim, MDOT built a 9.1-mile (14.6 km) freeway segment north to Napier Avenue that was opened on August 27, 2003, at a cost of $97 million (equivalent to $154 million in 2023). In 2020, work began on the final link to connect the US 31 freeway to I-94 east of Benton Harbor. The project cost $121.5 million dollars and involved relocating the interchange with the eastern terminus of BL I-94 and reconstructing 3.5 miles (5.6 km) of I-94 in the area. Work on that interchange started in September 2020. US 31 was rerouted to follow its new freeway section for 1.8 miles (2.9 km) from the previous end of the freeway at Napier Avenue that opened in 2003 to I-94 at BL I-94, where US 31 then followed I-94 to the I-196 interchange as before. This new routing opened on November 9, 2022.

== Future ==
There are several future highway projects current in stages of planning or construction. One is looking at improvements to US 131 in St. Joseph County, which includes the bypass of Constantine that opened in October 2013. MDOT continues to purchase parcels for right-of-way to be used for future upgrades of US 127 along the expressway section between Ithaca and St. Johns.

The United States Congress legislated a highway proposal in 1991 known as I-73. Originally set to run along I-75 to Detroit, the definition was amended in 1995 to include a branch that would run along US 223 and US 127 to Grayling, then on a continuation along I-75 to Sault Ste. Marie. MDOT examined three options to build the freeway, but abandoned further study after June 12, 2001, diverting remaining funds to improvement of safety along the corridor. The department stated there was a "lack of need" for sections of the proposed freeway, and the project's website was taken offline in 2002. According to 2011 press reports, a group advocating on behalf of the freeway is working to revive the I-73 proposal in Michigan, but state and local governments continue to express disinterest in resurrecting the freeway.

== See also ==
- Michigan left
