= M-8 (Michigan highway) =

State highway in Wayne County, Michigan, United States

M-8
- Davison Avenue, Davison Freeway
- M-8 highlighted in red

Route information
- Maintained by MDOT
- Length: 5.491 mi (8.837 km)
- History: 1942–1993 as a county freeway 1993–present as M-8

Major junctions
- West end: I-96 in Detroit
- M-10 in Detroit; M-1 in Highland Park; I-75 in Detroit
- East end: Conant Street in Detroit

Location
- Country: United States
- State: Michigan
- Counties: Wayne

Highway system
- Michigan State Trunkline Highway System; Interstate; US; State; Byways
← US 8	→ M-9

M-8 is a 5.5-mile (8.9 km) state trunkline highway in the U.S. state of Michigan lying within the cities of Detroit and Highland Park. Much of it is the Davison Freeway, the nation's first urban depressed freeway, which became a connector between the Lodge (M-10) and the Chrysler (Interstate 75, I-75) freeways.

Named for Jarad Davison, an English immigrant to the area, Davison Avenue was originally the only street connecting across Highland Park to Detroit. It was rebuilt by the city and Wayne County as a freeway during World War II. The roadway was transferred to the jurisdiction of the Michigan Department of Transportation (MDOT) in 1993 and numbered as M-8. Subsequent changes by the state rebuilt the freeway and extended the M-8 designation to connect to the Jeffries Freeway (I-96).

== Route description ==
M-8 starts on the western end at an interchange with I-96 in Detroit. Davison Avenue continues west of this interchange forming a service drive for the freeway while M-8 uses a short section of freeway to connect between I-96 and Davison Avenue. This short freeway segment runs easterly to Livernois Avenue where the trunkline transitions into Davison Avenue. East of this transition, the roadway turns northeasterly running through residential areas of Detroit. The trunkline meets M-10/Lodge Freeway on the border between Detroit and Highland Park, a city surrounded by Detroit. Northeast of this interchange, M-8 becomes the Davison Freeway, running depressed below the level of the cross streets. There are interchanges for M-1/Woodward Avenue and Oakland Avenue before meeting the Chrysler Freeway (I-75) on the eastern border of Highland Park. The Davison Freeway continues northeasterly in Detroit north of Hamtramck. The freeway ends between Gallagher and Newbern avenues. M-8 continues to Conant Street where the designation ends. Davison Avenue continues past Mound Road where it turns back due east until it ends at Van Dyke Street next to the Mt. Olivet Cemetery.

MDOT's 2007 traffic surveys counted the average annual daily traffic (AADT), a measure of the number of vehicles using a section of roadway on any given day of the year. An average of 38,000 vehicles used the western section of M-8 along Davison Avenue in 2007 each day; the eastern segment carried 37,300 vehicles. The section of freeway in between carried in excess of 50,000 vehicles a day in 2007 between M-10 and I-75. Of this traffic, 1,900 trucks and other commercial vehicles used the trunkline.

== History ==
Davison Avenue predates both the Davison Freeway and the M-8 state trunkline designation in the area. The roadway was named for Jarad Davison, an English immigrant and one of the early settlers of the area. The street was the only one of the 30 parallel streets in Highland Park that crossed through the city from border to border and connected with Detroit streets. This road was heavily congested, approaching gridlock during rush hour by 1940. A traffic survey showed that 96% of the traffic using the street was crossing Highland Park with no destination in the city. A proposal to rebuild the street as a six-lane, limited-access highway was approved by the Highland Park City Council on March 17, 1941. The council also appropriated $100,000 (equivalent to $1.64 million in 2024) for the construction with Wayne County and the remaining $3,400,000 (equivalent to $55.8 million in 2024) paid by state and federal government appropriations.

The freeway construction required a half-block of right-of-way on the south side of Davison Avenue and the demolition of 69 homes to accommodate the 12–17 feet (3.7–5.2 m) of excavation along the 1.3-mile (2.1 km) project. Another 63 homes were moved. The outbreak of World War II accelerated the construction schedule after the project was given priority due to the defense plants near the roadway. The freeway opened for traffic without a dedication ceremony at 4:00 p.m. on November 25, 1942. Travel times across Highland Park dropped from 15 minutes to around 3–4 minutes after the freeway opened. The roadway was the first urban, depressed freeway in the United States. The concrete for the road bed was cured underwater by flooding, creating an extremely hard and durable surface which lasted for more than 50 years (some requiring dynamite for its eventual removal).

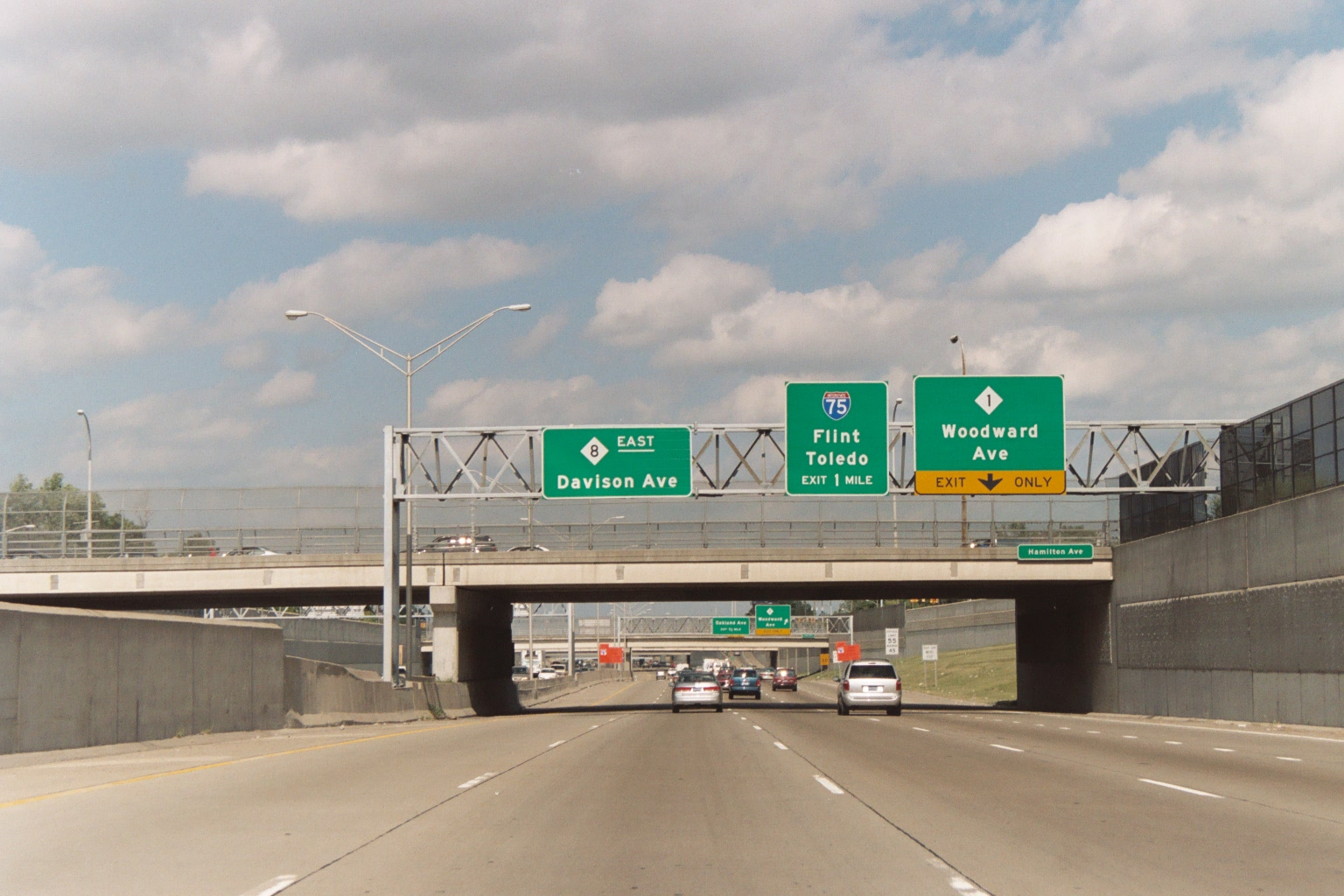
The Davison (M-8)

In 1968, the freeway was extended eastward a few blocks through a junction with the newly opened Chrysler Freeway (I-75) to its present-day eastern terminus near Conant Street. The state requested additional Interstate Highway System mileage that year as well, and in the proposals submitted was a request to extend the Davison to I-96 and I-94. These plans to transfer the freeway to state control and extend it were dropped in the 1970s after opposition to another freeway in Detroit. The plans would have extended it west to the Jeffries and east to a Van Dyke Freeway (extended M-53). Upon its transfer to state control in 1993, it had previously been a county-maintained freeway, the Davison Freeway was designated as M-8. Three years later, the Davison was closed for a year and a half to reconstruct it to Interstate Highway standards with an additional through travel lane and a wider left shoulder for improved safety and traffic handling as well as a new interchange with Woodward Avenue. The reconstructed freeway was reopened on October 8, 1997, by Governor John Engler.

In 2001, M-8 was extended to include the two-mile (3.2 km) segment of Davison Avenue between the freeway's western terminus and Davison Avenue's junction with I-96 (Jeffries Freeway). Except for a M-8 shield on the Lodge Freeway's Davison Avenue exit signs, the non-freeway portion of M-8 remains unsigned, including at the Davison Avenue exit from the Jeffries where new Clearview signs were erected as part of a large I-96 reconstruction project in 2005.

== Exit list ==
The entire highway is in Wayne County. All exits are unnumbered.

Location	mi	km	Destinations	Notes
Detroit	0.000	0.000	I-96 (Jeffries Freeway) – Downtown Detroit, Lansing	Exit 186 on I-96
Detroit	0.677	1.090	Eastern end of freeway	
Detroit	2.645	4.257	Western end of freeway	
Detroit	2.698	4.342	M-10 (Lodge Freeway) – Downtown Detroit, Lansing	Exit 7 on M-10; no eastbound exit to M-10 north or westbound entrance from M-10 south
Highland Park	3.542	5.700	M-1 (Woodward Avenue)	Eastbound exit and westbound entrance; westbound exit and eastbound entrance via Oakland Avenue exit
Highland Park	4.038	6.499	Oakland Avenue	Signed as Oakland Avenue and Woodward Avenue westbound
Detroit	4.442	7.149	I-75 (Chrysler Freeway) – Flint, Toledo	Exit 56 on I-75
Detroit	5.305	8.538	Eastern end of freeway	
Detroit	5.491	8.837	Conant Street	
1.000 mi = 1.609 km; 1.000 km = 0.621 mi: Incomplete access
