= MotorCities National Heritage Area =

United States National Heritage Area in Michigan

MotorCities National Heritage Area or Motor Cities National Heritage Area is a federally designated National Heritage Area that commemorates and promotes the automobile industry in Metro Detroit, with portions of 16 counties in southern Michigan, United States.

The scope of the heritage area includes sites and events relating to the motor industry as well as the industry's impact on labor, society and the environment. The heritage area comprises more than 1200 automotive-related sites, including the Henry Ford Museum, Fair Lane, various Ford plants, the Automotive Hall of Fame, the Sloan Museum, and the Arab American National Museum.

Counties within the national heritage area include Saginaw, Clinton, Shiawassee, Genesee, Macomb, Oakland, Livingston, Ingham, Eaton, Kalamazoo, Calhoun, Jackson, Washtenaw, Wayne, Monroe, and Lenawee counties. These counties comprise the Detroit metropolitan area, as well as Saginaw, Flint, Lansing, Ann Arbor, Battle Creek, Jackson, and Kalamazoo.

The MotorCities National Heritage Area was established on November 6, 1998, as the Automobile National Heritage Area. The name was later changed to MotorCities National Heritage Area.
