= Traffic tower =

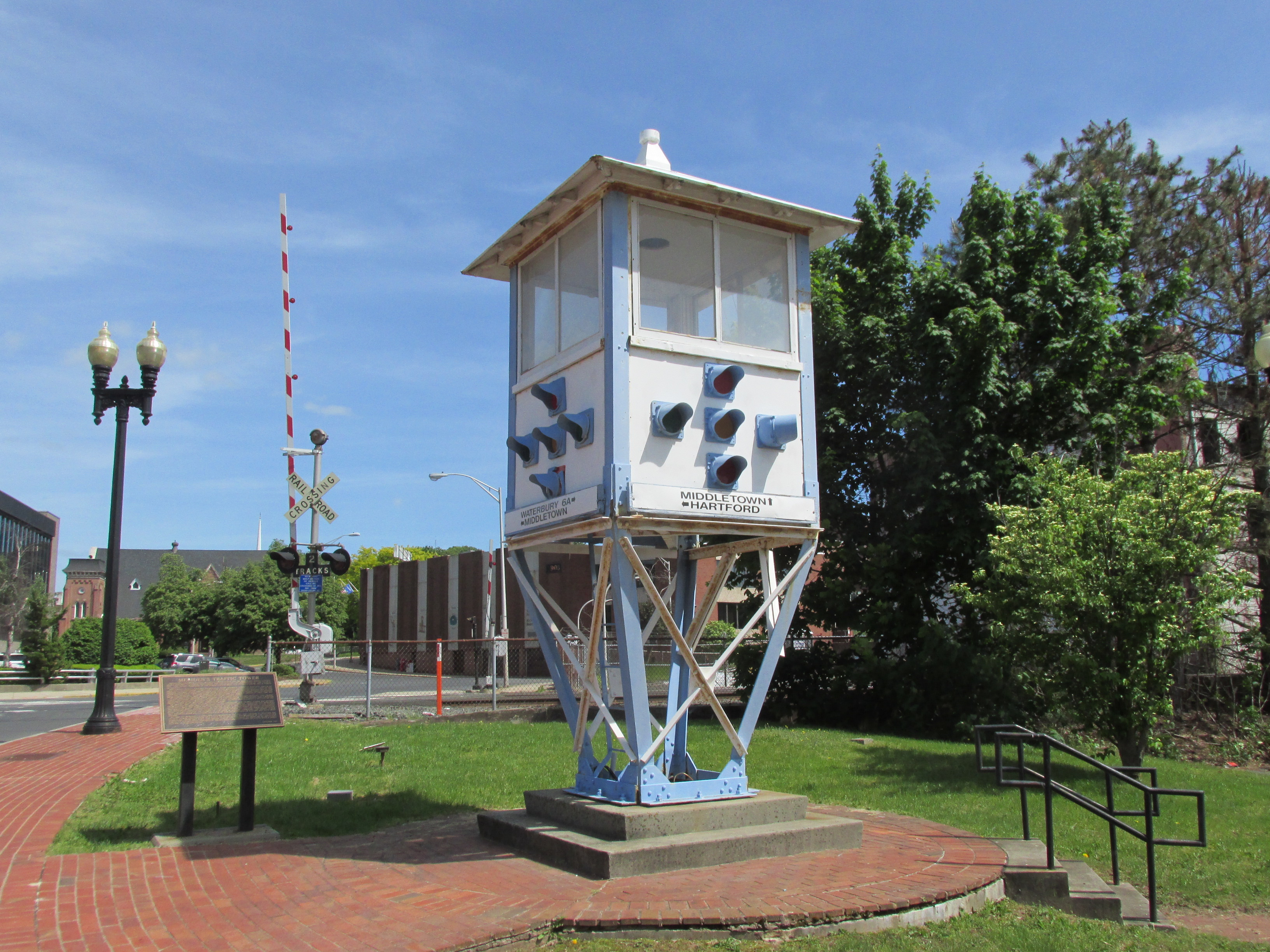
Traffic tower, Meriden, Connecticut - 2014

A traffic tower is a permanent raised structure providing a clearer view of traffic conditions than can be had from street level and protection for the traffic controller from the hazards of moving vehicles.

Some traffic towers are fitted with manually operated lights and/or signals. Other traffic towers rely on handsignals to direct traffic. In some cases, traffic towers offer a central control location for lights at more than one intersection.

Many traffic towers have been replaced by automated traffic lights. Many remaining traffic towers are significant landmarks and have been retained or moved to other locations as historic structures.

The last remaining traffic tower in the United Kingdom is in Bicester, Oxfordshire.

== See also ==
- Air traffic control tower
- Sea traffic control tower
