= Charles H. Wright Museum of African American History =

Museum in Detroit, Michigan, US

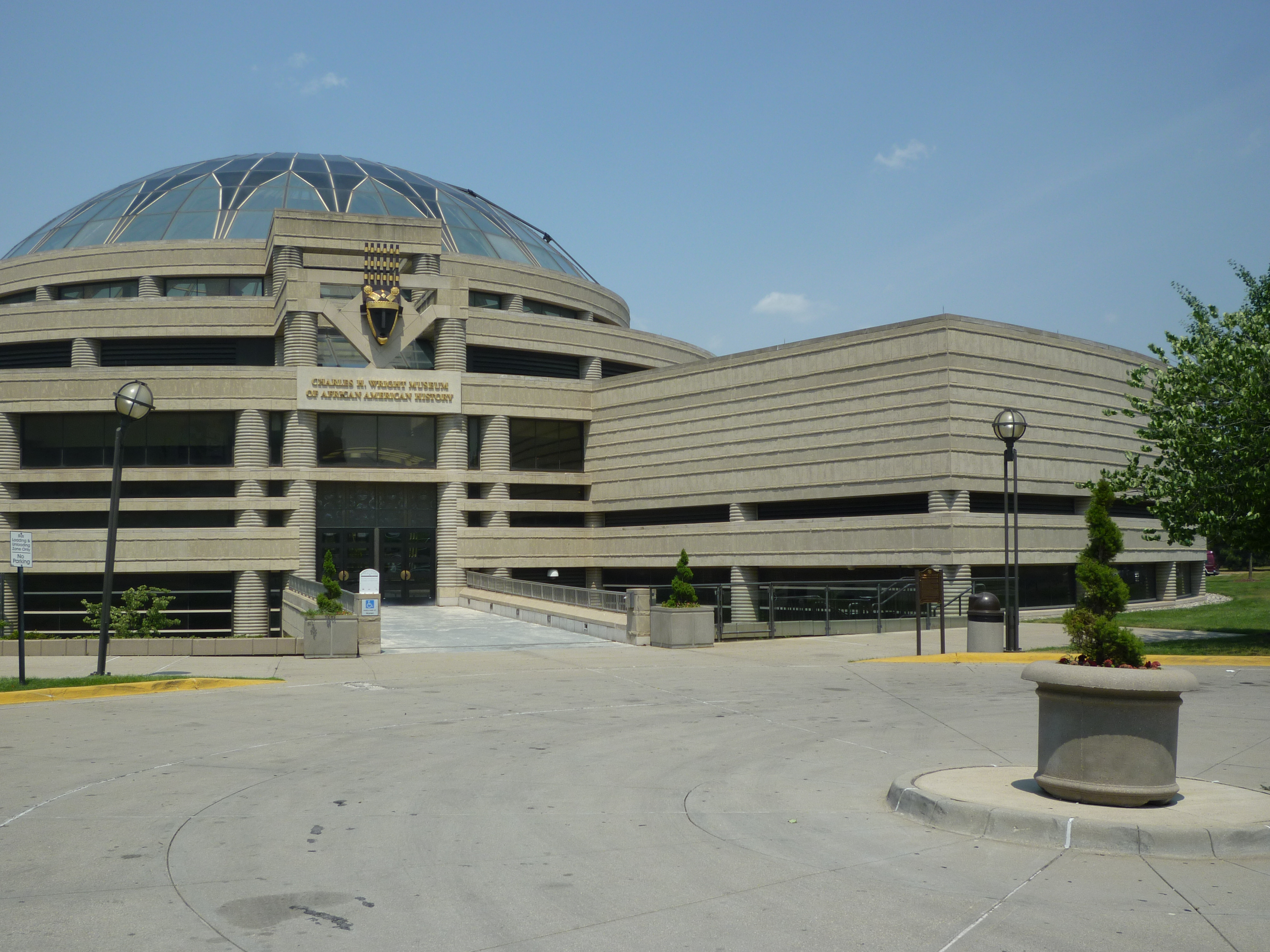
- Exterior of the museum
- Established: 1965 (current facility – 1997)
- Location: 315 E. Warren Ave; Detroit, Michigan
- Coordinates: 42°21′32.43″N 83°3′39.46″W
- Type: History museum and cultural history
- Collections: African-American history, art, music
- Collection size: more than 35,000
- Visitors: 300,000 (2019)
- Director: Neil Barclay
- Curator: Jennifer Evans
- Architect: SDG Associates
- Public transit access: QLine Warren Ave; DDOT 4, 8 SMART FAST Woodward 461, 462
- Website: thewright.org

The Charles H. Wright Museum of African American History (The Wright) is a museum of African-American history and culture located in Detroit, Michigan. Located in the city's Midtown Cultural Center, The Wright is one of the world's oldest and largest independent African-American museums and holds the world's largest permanent collection of African-American culture. Holding a collection of more than 35,000 artifacts, The Wright's current 125,000-square-foot (11,600 m^{2}) museum opened as the largest museum in the world dedicated to African-American history. With over 50,000 visits in 2024, it is considered one of the top tourist destinations in the city.

The Wright, whose exhibits include Underground Railroad documents and letters from Malcolm X and Rosa Parks, has also hosted memorial events for Parks, former Detroit mayor Coleman Young, Aretha Franklin, and former U.S. representatives John Conyers Jr. and Barbara-Rose Collins who lay in state in the museum's rotunda in 2005, 1997, 2018, 2019, and 2021, respectively.

Additionally, The Wright is the current home of The National Museum of the Tuskegee Airmen. It also produces the African World Festival—one of the largest festivals dedicated to celebrating the food, fashion, music, and dance cultures of the diaspora.

== History ==
=== International Afro-American Museum (1965) ===
Charles H. Wright, a Detroit-based obstetrician and gynecologist, felt inspired to create a repository for African-American history after he visited a memorial to World War II heroes in Denmark during the mid-twentieth century:

I was committed to what I defined as 'one of the most important tasks of our times... ensuring that generations, especially young African Americans, are made aware of and take pride in the history of their forebears and their remarkable struggle for freedom.

Wright would eventually create the International Afro-American Museum (IAM) in 1965; the IAM, located on 1549 West Grand Boulevard in a house owned by Dr. Wright, was opened in January 1966. It featured galleries of African art and instruments, a collection of inventions by African Americans, and an exhibition on Civil Rights activists. Some of the exhibits included the inventions of Michigan native Elijah McCoy, and masks from Nigeria and Ghana that Dr. Wright had acquired while visiting there. Wright also opened a traveling exhibit to tour the state.

=== Museum of African American History (1985) ===
In 1978, the city of Detroit leased the museum a plot of land in Midtown near the Detroit Public Library, the Detroit Institute of Art, and the Detroit Science Center. Groundbreaking for a new museum occurred on May 21, 1985. Two years later, the doors of the new 28,000-square-foot Museum of African American History were opened to the public at 301 Frederick Street.

=== Charles H. Wright Museum of African American History (1997) ===
Once again, the museum outgrew its facility and city leaders began developing ideas for a larger new museum. In 1992, Detroit voters authorized the City of Detroit to sell construction bonds to finance a larger building, and ground was broken for the third generation of the Museum in August 1993.

In 1997, Detroit architects Sims-Varner & Associates (now SDG Associates) designed a new 125,000 square foot (11,000 m^{2}) facility on Warren Avenue, the museum's current location. Later that December, Coleman Young, the first African American mayor of Detroit, would be the first to be given the honor lying in state at the museum.

In 1999, Christy S. Coleman became president and CEO of the museum, establishing a $12-million core exhibit. Since then, the Wright Museum has operated as a nonprofit institution with the dual mission of serving as both a museum of artifacts and a place of cultural retention and growth.

== Collections and exhibits ==
Home to the Blanche Coggin Underground Railroad Collection, the Harriet Tubman Museum Collection, and the Sheffield Collection (which details the labor movement in Detroit), The Wright houses more than 35,000 artifacts pertaining to the African-American experience. Some of the permanent exhibits and displays include:

=== And Still We Rise: Our Journey through African American History and Culture ===
Since its opening in 1965, The Wright presented 16,000 square foot exhibition, titled O the People: The African American Experience, encompassing over four centuries of history pertaining to the African diaspora. Four decades later, in 2000, discussions were held on updating the exhibition. In 2004, it was revised and rebranded to And Still We Rise.

And Still We Rise has since stood as the permanent exhibit for The Wright that offers a comprehensive look at the history of African-American resilience. The two-story interactive journey takes guests from African kingdoms and the tragedy of the Middle Passage, to the heroism of the Civil rights movement and beyond.

=== Luminosity: A Detroit Arts Gathering ===
In 2025, for the sixtieth anniversary of the museum, The Wright showcased a multimedia exhibit, Luminosity, to celebrate and commemorate "Black artists who have worked, lived or studied in Detroit," along with a range of other programming.

=== Ring of Genealogy ===
Located under The Wright's world-famous dome is master muralist Hubert Massey's 72-foot mural on the circular rotunda floor entitled "Genealogy." It was inspired by the struggle of African Americans for freedom, education, economic empowerment, and social equality. High-end terrazzo, marble chips, and cement were used to create the ornate flooring.

=== Wall ===
A wall of the museum has the museum's official poem, "This Museum Was Once a Dream," written by Melba Boyd, inscribed in bronze.

== Education and events ==
The Wright offers a range of public programs and educational opportunities for young audiences including historical reenactments, interpretive tours of exhibitions, seminars, summer camps, workshops, and more.

=== African World Festival ===
Launched in 1983 in Hart Plaza, African World Festival (AWF) was moved to the grounds of The Wright in 2012. AWF, the museum's largest public outreach program, is an event which annually welcomes more than 150,000 people over a three-day weekend in August; as such, it is one of the largest cultural festivals in the Midwest dedicated to celebrating the histories and cultures of the Diaspora. The event was canceled in 2020 due to COVID-19 restrictions but, in 2021, resumed as a hybrid event with in-person and virtual events. That year, it was reported that the Wright considered returning the festival back to Hart Plaza.

=== Juneteenth ===
Juneteenth is the oldest nationally celebrated commemoration of the ending of slavery in the United States. In 2021, days after President Joe Biden signed a law making Juneteenth, June 19, a federal holiday, the museum presented a hybrid virtual and in-person three-day celebration.

=== Kwanzaa celebration ===
Kwanzaa is celebrated from December 26 through January 1. Each year, The Wright hosts daily programming with songs and dances, storytelling, poetry reading, and more to mark the occasion.

=== Camp Africa ===
From science and technology to engineering, mathematics, and the arts, Camp Africa is a free, week-long summer day camp open to children ages 7 to 12. There, children are enrolled in programming that explores and celebrates the accomplishments of individuals in a variety of fields and careers across the African diaspora.

== Building highlights ==
=== Ford Freedom Rotunda ===
The Ford Freedom Rotunda features a glass dome that measures 100 feet in diameter by 55 feet high glass dome; making it two feet wider than the Michigan State Capitol dome. Flags of the 92 nations represented in African-American history adorn the upper level of the rotunda, while the Ring of Genealogy, a 37-foot terrazzo tile creation featuring bronze nameplates of prominent African Americans in history, is on the ground level.

=== General Motors Theater ===
The General Motors Theater is a 317-seat facility that serves to host lectures, concerts, film screenings, presentations, seminars, and workshops.

=== Ripple of impact ===
In response to severe flooding that impacted Detroit in August 2014, The Wright collaborated with neighboring institution Michigan Science Center to build and manage stormwater diversion equipment on Warren Avenue. This sustainability initiative has helped The Wright effectively manage nearly 190,000 gallons of stormwater each year and has been responsible for removing 50,000 gallons of stormwater permanently from the sewer system overall.

Additionally, the development of green stormwater infrastructure projects, like the newly renovated bioswale and urban gardens, has helped prevent pollution to the Detroit River and teach students and visitors about land and water preservation & sustainability.

== See also ==
- History of the African-Americans in Metro Detroit
- List of museums focused on African Americans
- (Detroit) Cultural Center Historic District
- Detroit Historical Museum
- Detroit Institute of Arts
- Detroit Science Center
