= American Association for State and Local History =

It is the main with magazines

American Association for State and Local History (AASLH)
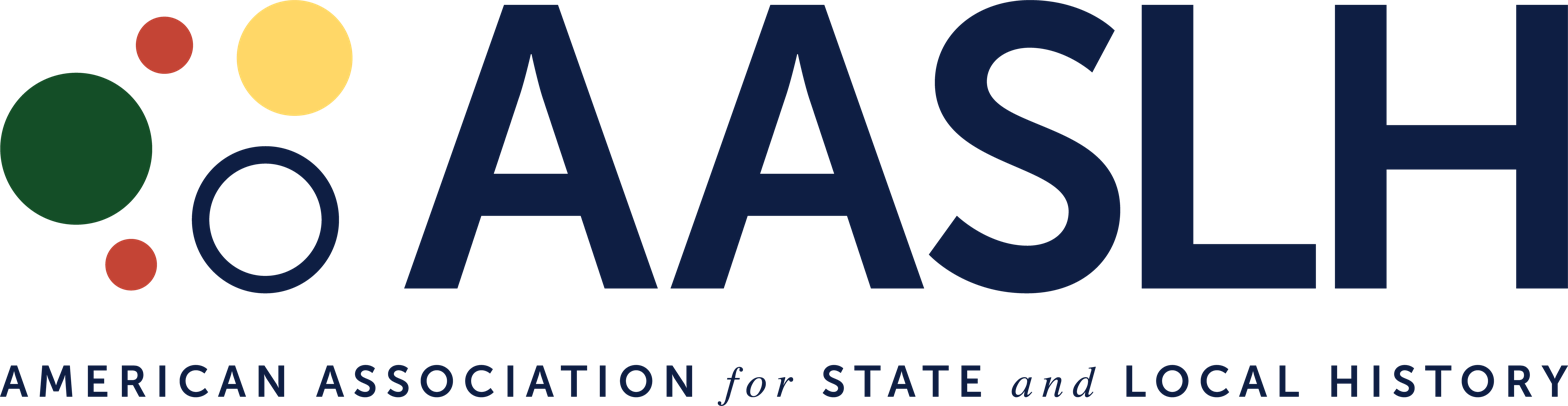
- Established: 1940
- Founder: Christopher C. Crittenden
- Type: Non-profit association
- Headquarters: Nashville, TN
- Region served: United States
- Members: 4,500+
- Key people: John Dichtl, Bethany Hawkins, Norman Burns, Burt Logan, Christy Coleman
- Website: aaslh.org

The American Association for State and Local History (AASLH) is a non-profit association for state and local history, with a primary focus on history professionals, history volunteers, museums, historical societies, and other history-related organizations and public history professionals. Since 1964, it is headquartered in Nashville, TN, and currently has about 3,200 institutional members, 1,300 individual members, and 34 academic program members. The organization has 11 full-time staff members.

== History ==
In 1904, the American Historical Association, itself at the time a fledgling professional body, established the semi-autonomous Conference of State and Local Historical Societies to serve the leaders of those agencies. In 1939, a group of Conference members, chaired by Christopher C. Crittenden, director of the North Carolina Department of Archives and History, proposed the creation of an independent entity. Its job would be to better coordinate the activities of historical societies and stimulate the writing and teaching of state and local history in North America. On December 27, 1940, the Conference of State and Local History met and disbanded itself. Then the American Association for State and Local History was born. Its first charter stated that AASLH's purpose was, simply, “the promotion of effort and activity in the fields of state, provincial, and local history in the United States and Canada.”

- 1904: American Historical Association establishes Conference of State and Local Historical Societies
- 1940: Conference of State and Local Historical Societies seceded from the American Historical Association. The mission was "the promotion of effort and activity in the fields of state, provincial, and local history in the United States and Canada."
- 1940: Began publishing books
- 1945: Establishment of awards program
- 1968: Began publishing Technical Leaflets
- 2002: Adopted statement of professional standards and ethics
- 2005: Began developing STEPS program
- 2009: "Dispatch" became an all-digital publication
- 2010: Launched STEPS program

== Publications ==
AASLH publishes a quarterly magazine called History News. A series of instructional articles called Technical Leaflets are published quarterly and distributed with History News. AASLH also publishes books through Rowman & Littlefield Publishing Group including Nomenclature 4.0,Small Museum Toolkit, and the Interpreting History series.

== STEPS (Standards and Excellence Program for History Organizations) ==
In 2009 AASLH launched the "Standards and Excellence Program for History Organizations," or STEPS. This program helps small- and mid-sized history museums, historic sites and houses, including all-volunteer ones, assess policies and practices, manage daily operations and plan for the future. As opposed to a certification program, STEPS is a self-study program without a set timeline. Participating organizations use a workbook to assess and improve operations. They achieve certificates from AASLH after completing sections. As of 2021, over 1,100 organizations have participated.

== Advocacy ==
AASLH sponsors, advocates, and lobbies on behalf of state and local history at the national level through strategic partnerships with several organizations. In 1998, it began its American Indian Museums Program (AIMP) to advocate for and provide professional development to America's tribal museums. In 2004, it spearheaded a movement advocating for a new federal program within the Institute of Museum and Library Services’ Office of Museum Studies to provide grants to states to facilitate statewide support for museums, with funds granted to states, where states would then re-grant funds to museums depending upon each state's needs.

== Leadership in History Awards ==
Established in 1945 these awards recognize projects, programs, publications, and individuals that meet standards in collecting, preserving, and interpreting state and local history to make history meaningful. Current awards are Award of Excellence, Award of Distinction, Albert B. Corey Award, History in Progress Award, and Publication Awards.

== Conferences ==
AASLH began holding an annual meeting in 1941. Today, the association has two conferences: the in-person annual conference and the online virtual conference.

== See also ==
- Local history: United States
- American urban history
- American Alliance of Museums
- Association of Art Museum Directors
