= Detroit Public Library Main Branch =

Library building in Michigan, US

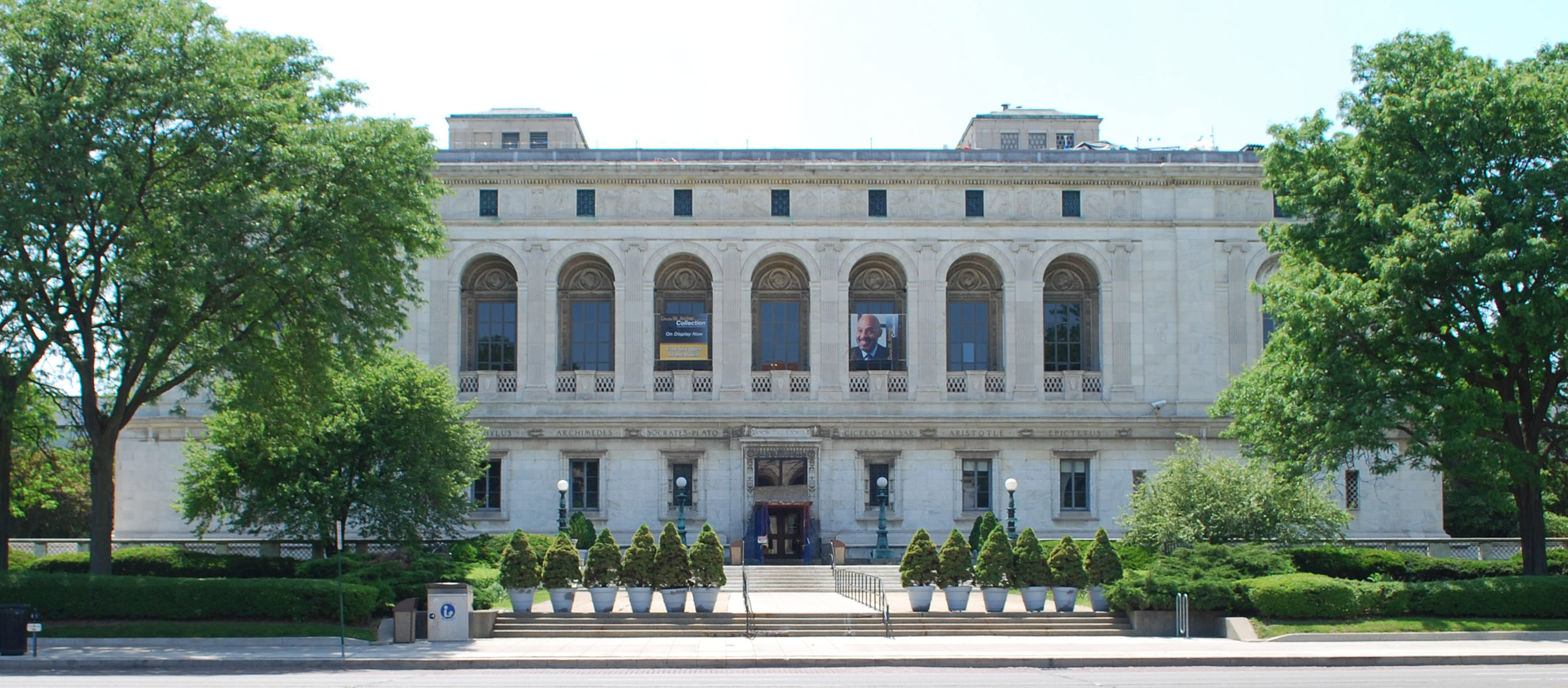
- 42.3586°N 83.0667°W
- Location: 5201 Woodward Ave, Detroit, Wayne County, Michigan, United States, 48202
- Architects: Cass Gilbert Sr, Cass Gilbert Jr, Francis Keally
- Detroit Public Library
- U.S. Historic district – Contributing property
- Michigan State Historic Site
- Built: 1921, 1963
- Architect: Cass Gilbert
- Architectural style: Italian Renaissance
- Part of: Cultural Center Historic District (ID83003791)

Significant dates
- Designated CP: November 21, 1983
- Designated MSHS: January 24, 1964
- Branch of: Detroit Public Library

Other information
- Public transit access: Warren Avenue, Ferry Street; DDOT 4, 8, 16; SMART FAST Woodward 461, 462

The Main Branch is the headquarters of the Detroit Public Library System in Detroit, Michigan. It is located in Detroit's Midtown neighborhood, between Woodward Avenue and Cass Avenue.

Designed by Cass Gilbert, the Main Branch was constructed with Vermont marble and serpentine Italian marble trim in an Italian Renaissance style. His son, Cass Gilbert Jr. was a partner with Francis Keally in the design of the library's additional wings added in 1963. Among his other buildings, Cass Gilbert designed the United States Supreme Court Building in Washington, D.C., the Minnesota State Capitol and the Woolworth Building in New York City.

== History ==
In 1901, the Library Commission called a meeting to consider a new Main Library building. At the time, the Centre Park Library on Gratiot and Library street in the downtown district was the main branch. Andrew Carnegie offered $750,000 for the proposed main branch, and the city asked to submit a ballot question regarding issuing $500,000 of library bonds for purpose of complying with Carnegie's offer. However, voters rejected Carnegie's gift in 1907 and approved a $750,000 bond issue. Eventually, Carnegie's offer was accepted in 1910 by Common Council. In 1912, property near Woodward and Kirby was purchased, and in 1913 Cass Gilbert was awarded the architectural contract. The design was a three-floor, early Italian Renaissance-style building at 180,000 square feet. Due to delays and World War I, the Main Library did not open until March 21, 1921. It was dedicated June 3, 1921.

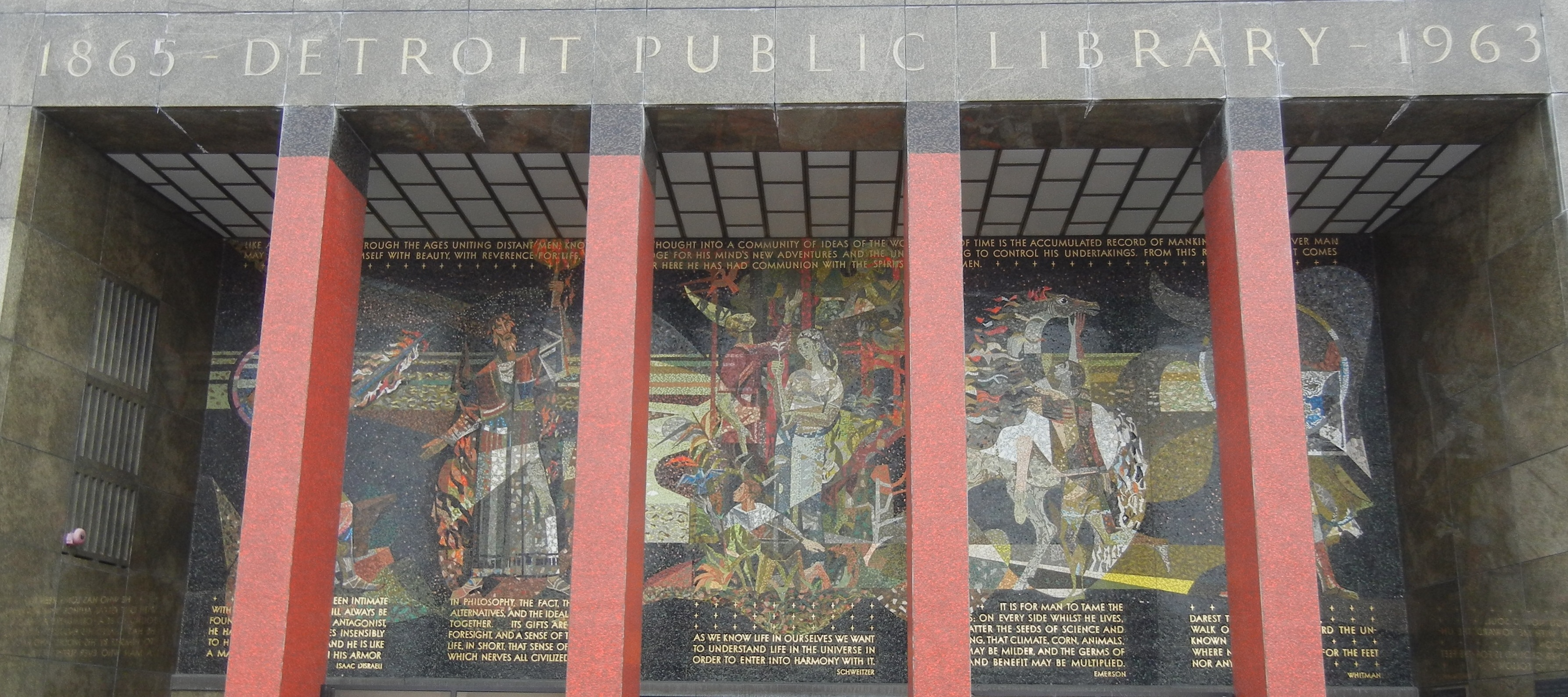
Cass Avenue Entrance Mosaic

Discussion began as early as 1926 for additions. In 1944, Cass Gilbert Jr. and Francis Keally were named architects for an addition that would extend wings to the north and south. Construction began on the wings in 1957 after Common Council authorized the first issue of library bonds for financing. The north and south wings opened on June 23, 1963, and added 240,000 square feet to the building. The wings were connected along the rear of the original building and a new entrance created on Cass Avenue. Above this entrance is a mosaic by Millard Sheets entitled The River of Knowledge. As part of the addition, a triptych mural was added to the west wall of Adam Strohm Hall on the third floor. The mural by local artist John Stephens Coppin is entitled Man's Mobility and depicts a history of transportation. This mural complements a triptych mural on the opposite wall completed in 1921 by Gari Melchers depicting Detroit's early history.

The building was added to the National Register of Historic Places in 1983 as a contributing property to the Cultural Center Historic District.

== Departments ==
=== Children's Library/H.Y.P.E. Teen Center ===
Children's Room in 1921

The Children's Library and H.Y.P.E. Teen Center are located in different rooms of Main Branch. Currently, the H.Y.P.E. Teen Center is located in the original 1921 Children's Room, and the Children's Library is located in the Children's Room, an area built during the 1963 addition. The H.Y.P.E. Teen Center still contains the original installations meant for the 1921 Children's Room. For example, an authentic Pewabic Fireplace designed and executed by Mary Chase Perry Stratton and Horace James Caulkins depicts fairy tales and children's fables. The frieze illustrates The Owl and the Birds from Aesop's Fables, and the subjects of each tile include Pocahontas and John Smith, Alice's Adventures in Wonderland, Ulysses from The Odyssey, Tar Baby and B'rer Rabbit, Hansel and Gretel, the Tin Soldier, Titania and Bottom from A Midsummer Night's Dream, Aladdin, Mowgli and the Bear from The Jungle Book, and Robinson Crusoe. Additionally, a pictorial map of the state of Michigan hangs above the fireplace. The map was designed by Frederick J. Wiley.

The current Children's Room contains a series a mosaics designed and executed by Gail Rosenbloom Kaplan and Dani Katsir. These works include Read (2015), Healthy Living (2016), Under the Sea (2016), Music (2016), Sports (2016), Transportation (2016), and Earth (2017). Additionally, there is a display for the American Girl Doll Melody Ellison. Melody is written as a Detroit native in her accompanying book series.

=== Special Collections ===
The Burton Historical Collection, E. Azalia Hackley Collection, Ernie Harwell Sports Collection, and Rare Book Collection are all housed at the Main library. The public can view materials in these collections by request within the Burton Reading Room. Some portions of the collections have also been digitized for online perusal.

The Burton Historical Collection began as the private collection of Clarence Monroe Burton. At first, it was kept in his home on Brainard Street, where he welcomed scholars and researchers to use his library. After Burton built a new home for himself, the collection and the deed to his Brainard home were donated to the Detroit Public Library. The Burton Historical Collection was opened to the public in 1916, and in 1921 it was moved to the newly constructed Main Library. The Burton Reading Room on the fourth floor was named in honor of Clarence Burton. During expansion in the 1960's, a new Burton Reading Room was constructed on the first floor and is still in use today. Burton's original intention was to create a collection focused on the history of Detroit. However, the collection soon expanded to the Old Northwest, Canada, and New France, as Burton realized their connection to the city. Today, the collection includes books, manuscripts, maps, newspapers, photographs, family histories, church records, military records, obituaries, and land records. New material related to the history of Detroit is still added.

The E. Azalia Hackley Collection of African Americans in the Performing Arts was established in 1943 when original materials were presented to the Detroit Public Library by the Detroit Musicians Association. It is named after Emma Azalia Hackley, a notable African-American musician. This collection includes books, manuscripts, sheet music, biographical files, and photographs. A portion of the collection is housed in the Reading Room of the E. Azalia Hackley Collection of African Americans in the Performing Arts. This room was formerly known as the Book Lover's Room, and it is adjacent to Adam Strohm Hall. The collection accepts donations related to the history of African-Americans in music.

The Ernie Harwell Sports Collection was established in 1966 when sportscaster Ernie Harwell made his first donation. The collection is primarily focused on American baseball and the Detroit Tigers, but does include other sports. Items within the collection include books, photographs, media guides, programs, and manuscripts. A portion of the collection is housed in the Lulu and Ernie Harwell Room, open by appointment only. Items in the room include seats from Tiger Stadium at Michigan and Trumbull and a mock broadcast booth. The library accepts donations to this collection related to sports history, with special consideration given to baseball, Ernie Harwell, or the Detroit Tigers.

The Rare Book Collection, begun in 1948, acquires and preserves rare materials such as first editions, fine bindings, illuminated manuscripts, letters, and incunabula. The majority of this collection is kept in the Rare Book Room, located on the 2nd floor. The room's entrance includes black ebony doors engraved with the names of notable craftsmen in the development of the art of printing. The doors are flanked by polished bronze grilles in fleur-de-lis design, suggesting the gold tooling of 16th century fine book binding and based on the work of Jean Grolier. This feature was designed by architect Francis Keally. The library still accepts donations to this collection.

== Gallery ==
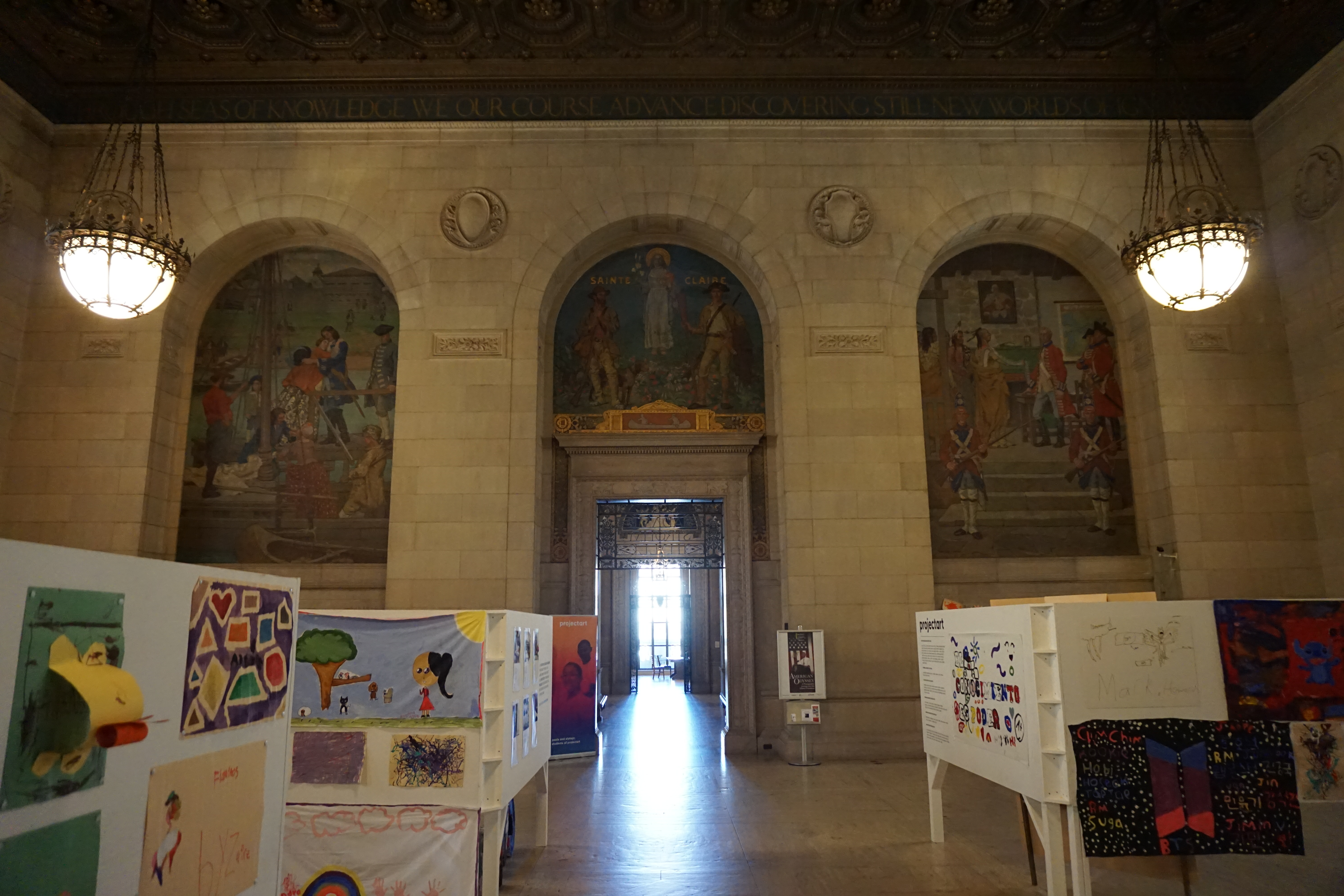

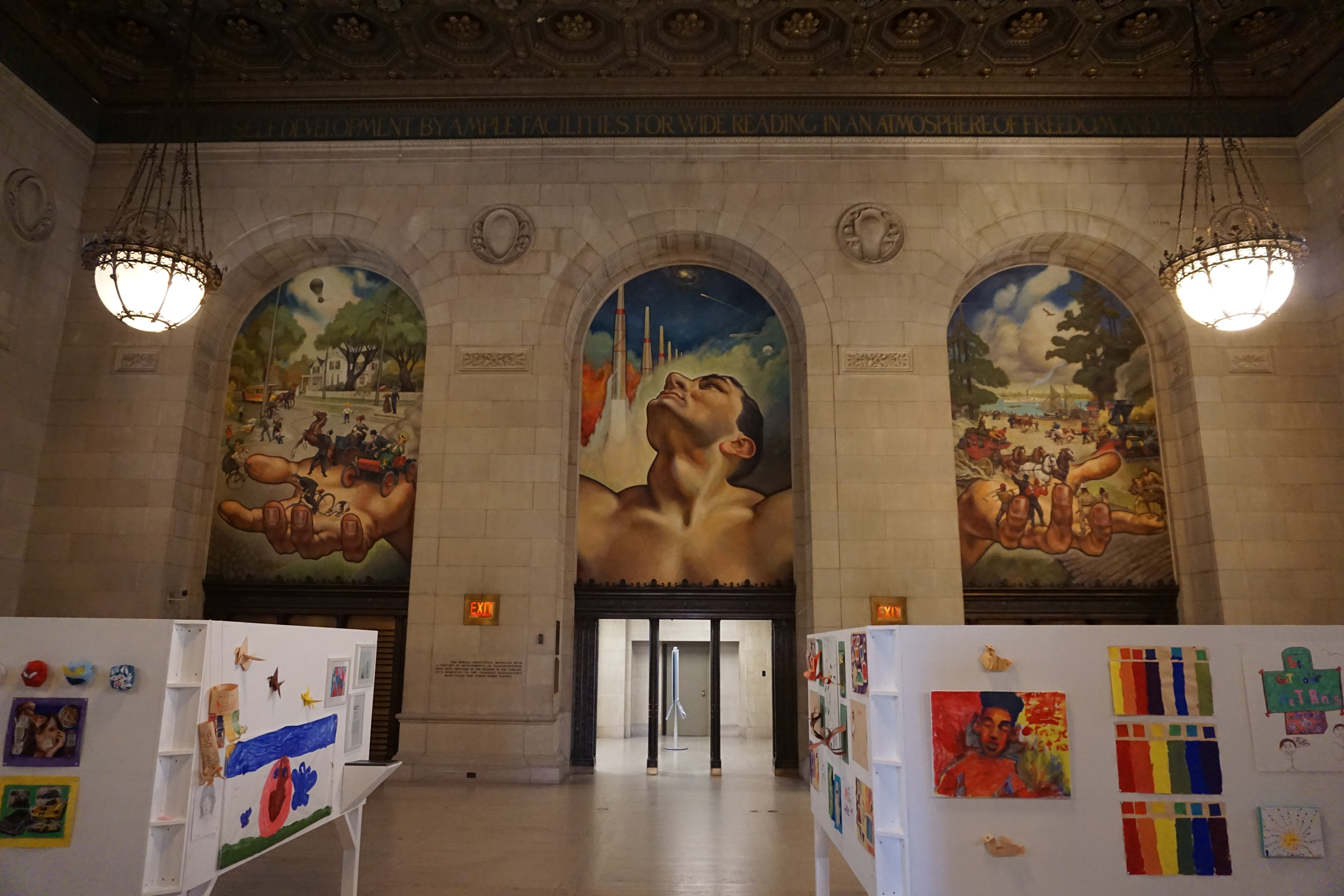

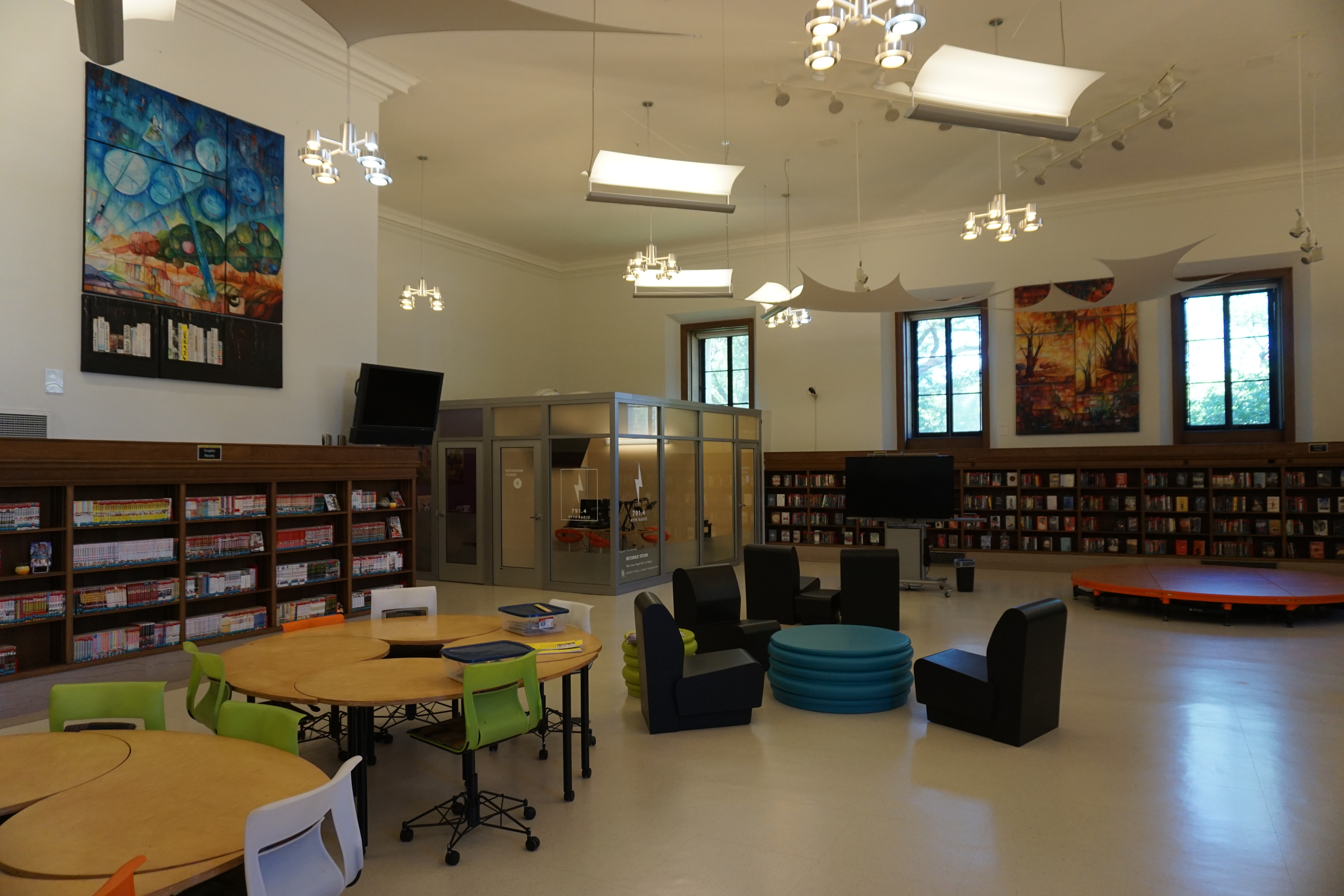

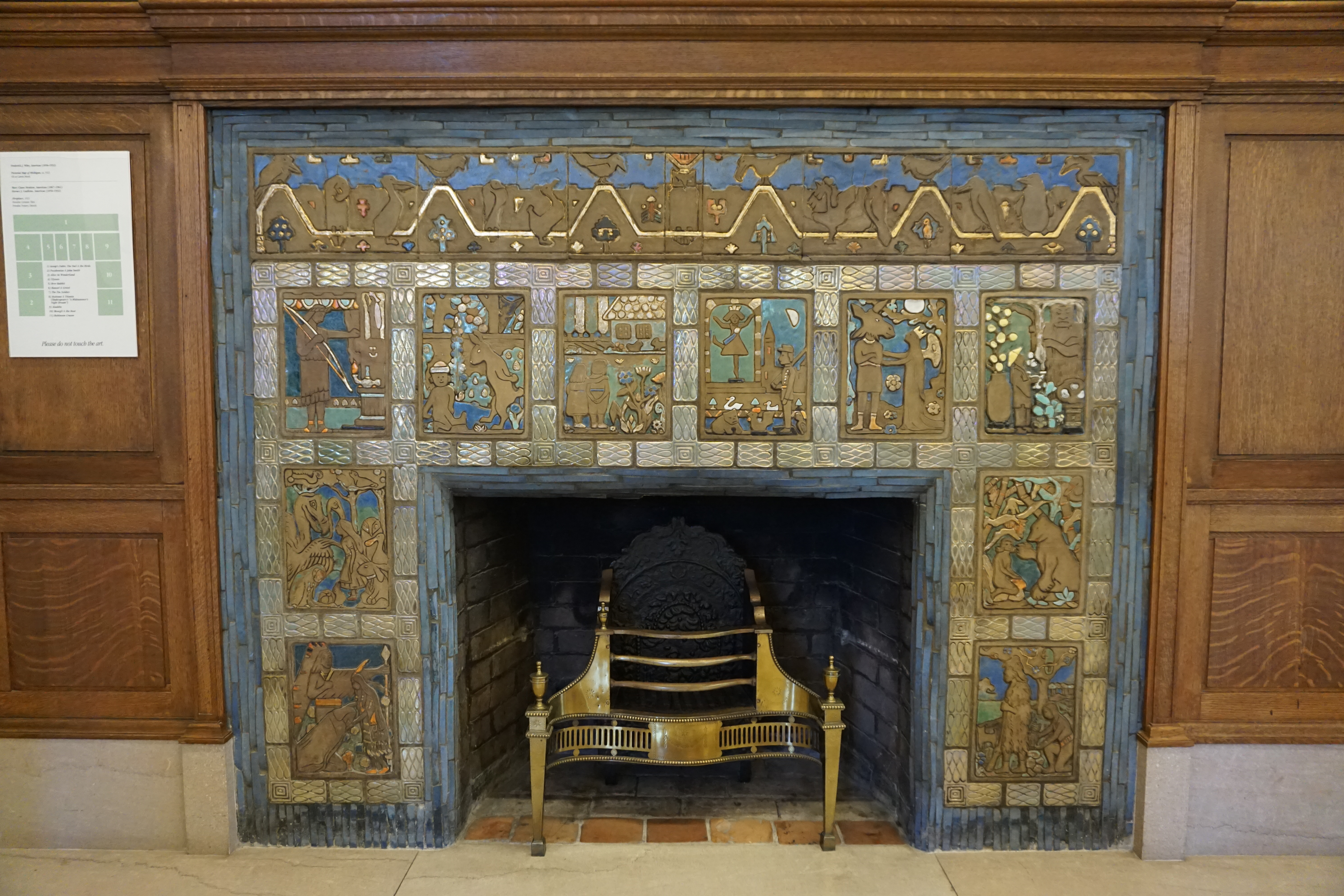

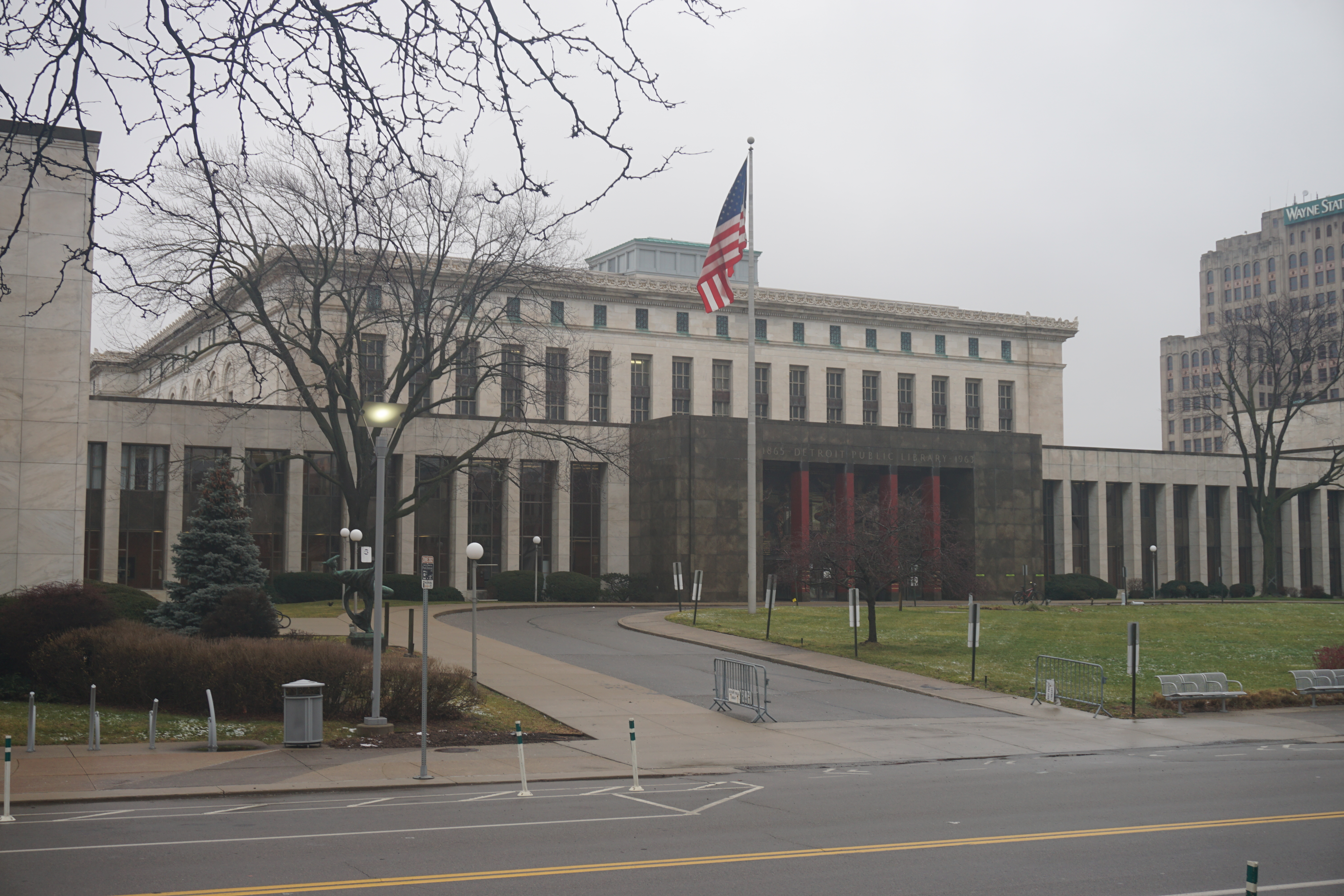

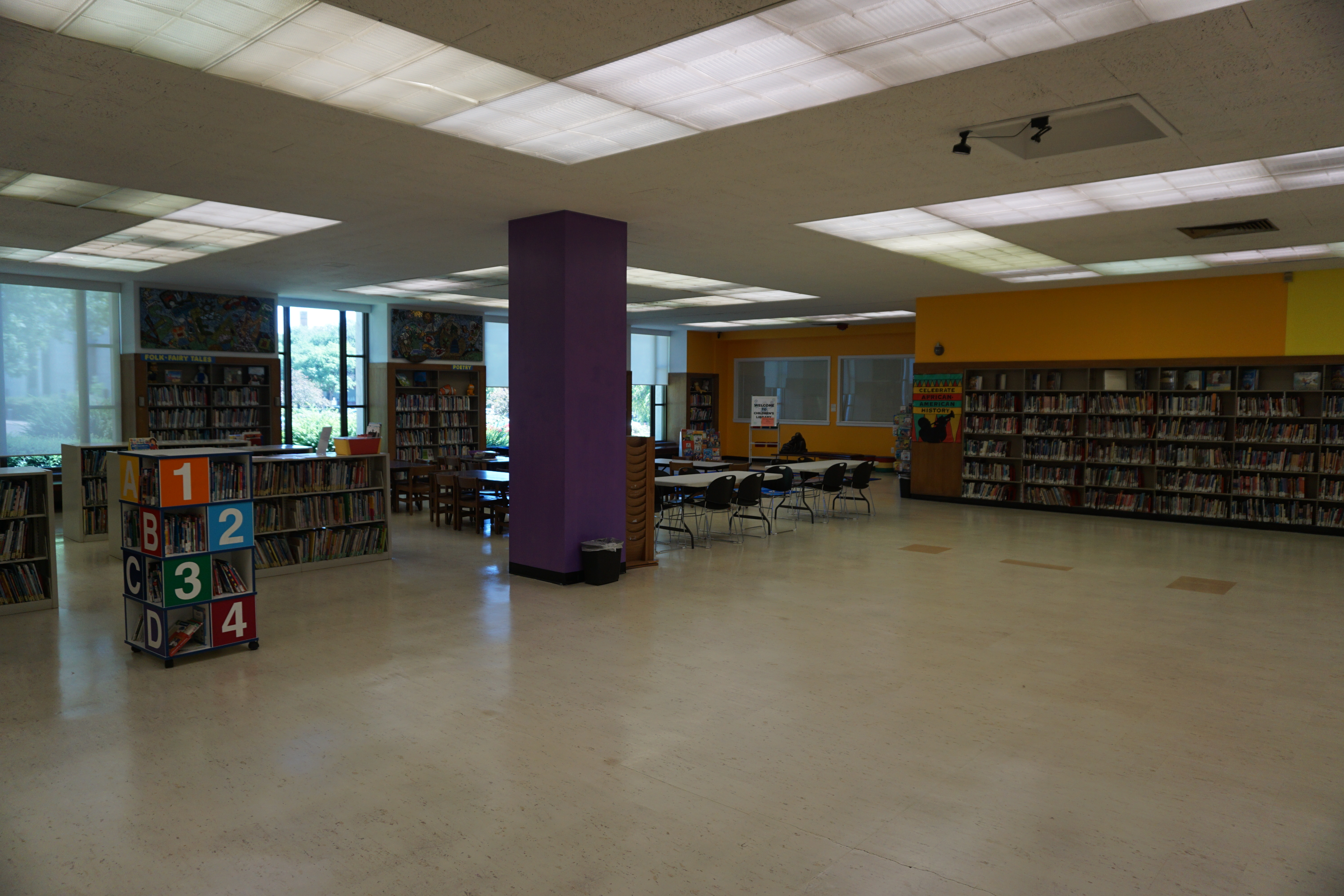

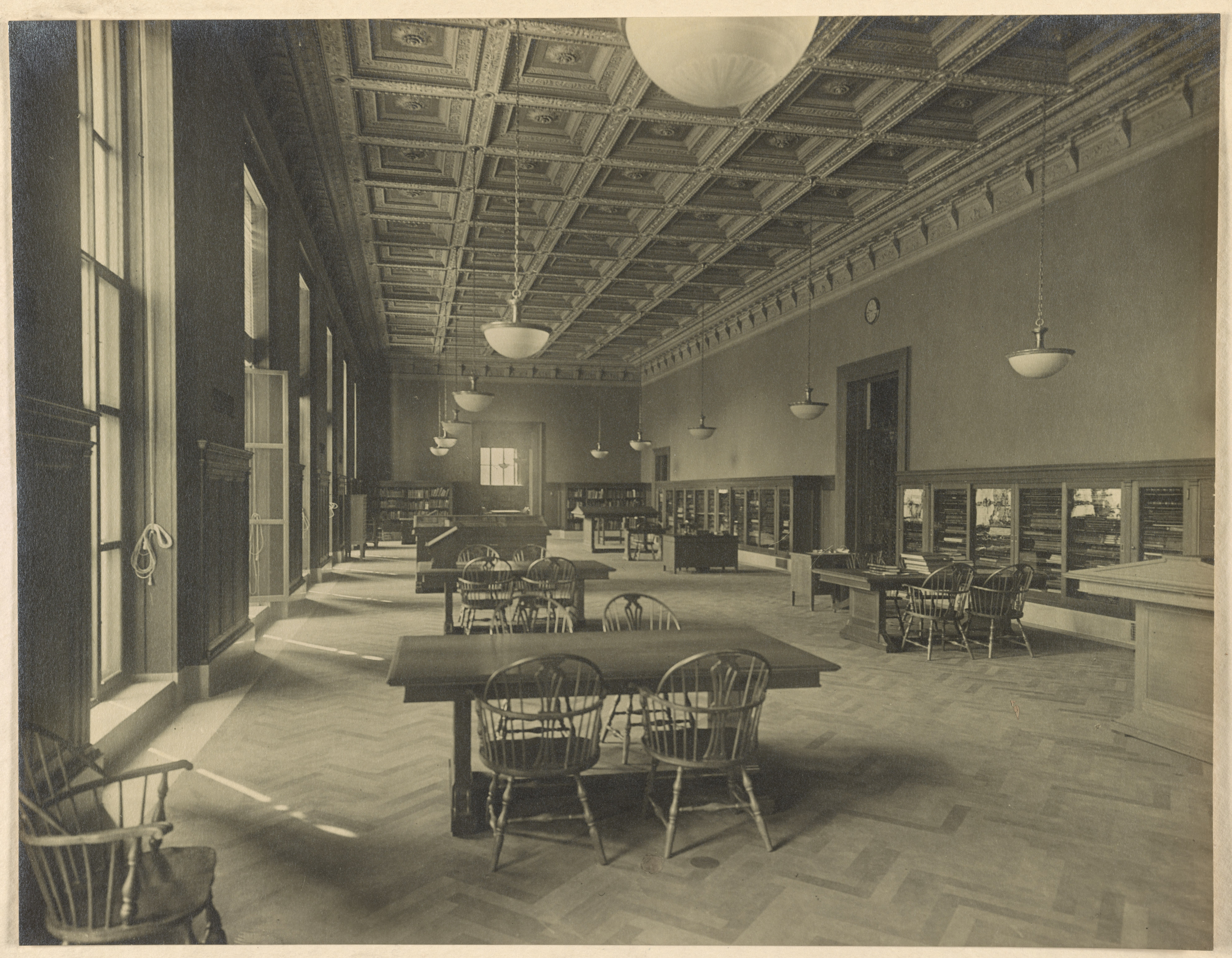

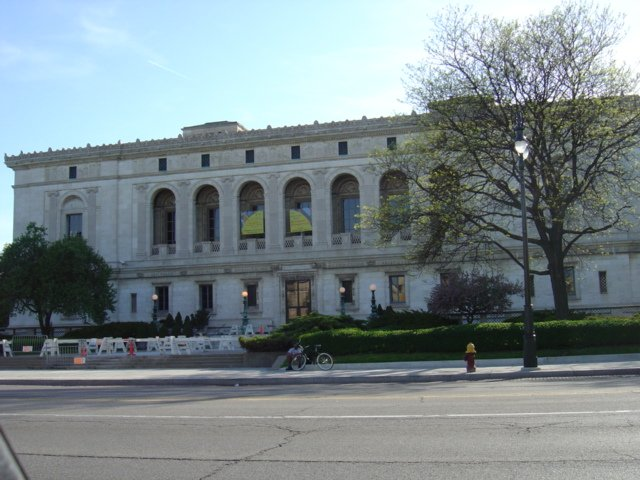

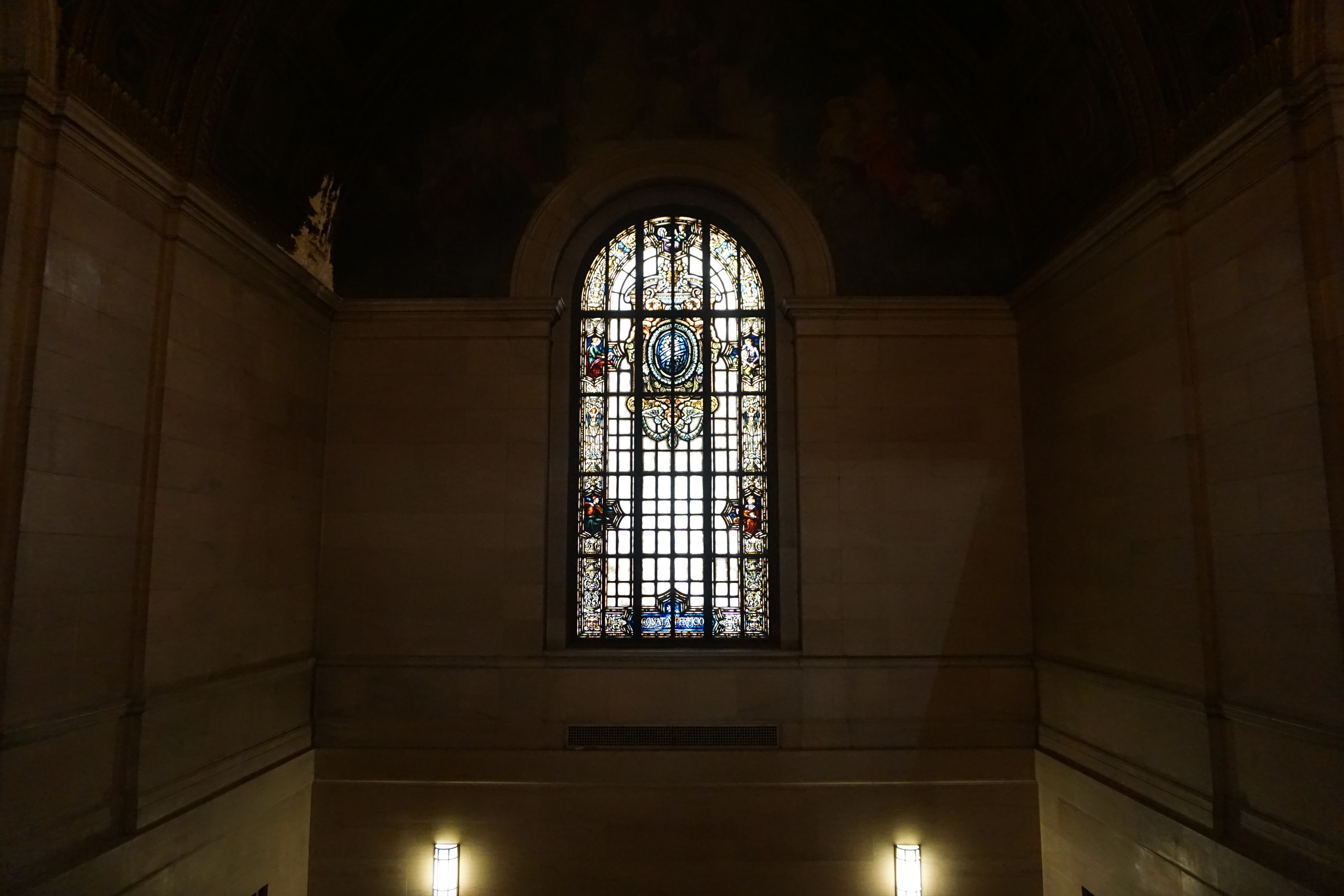

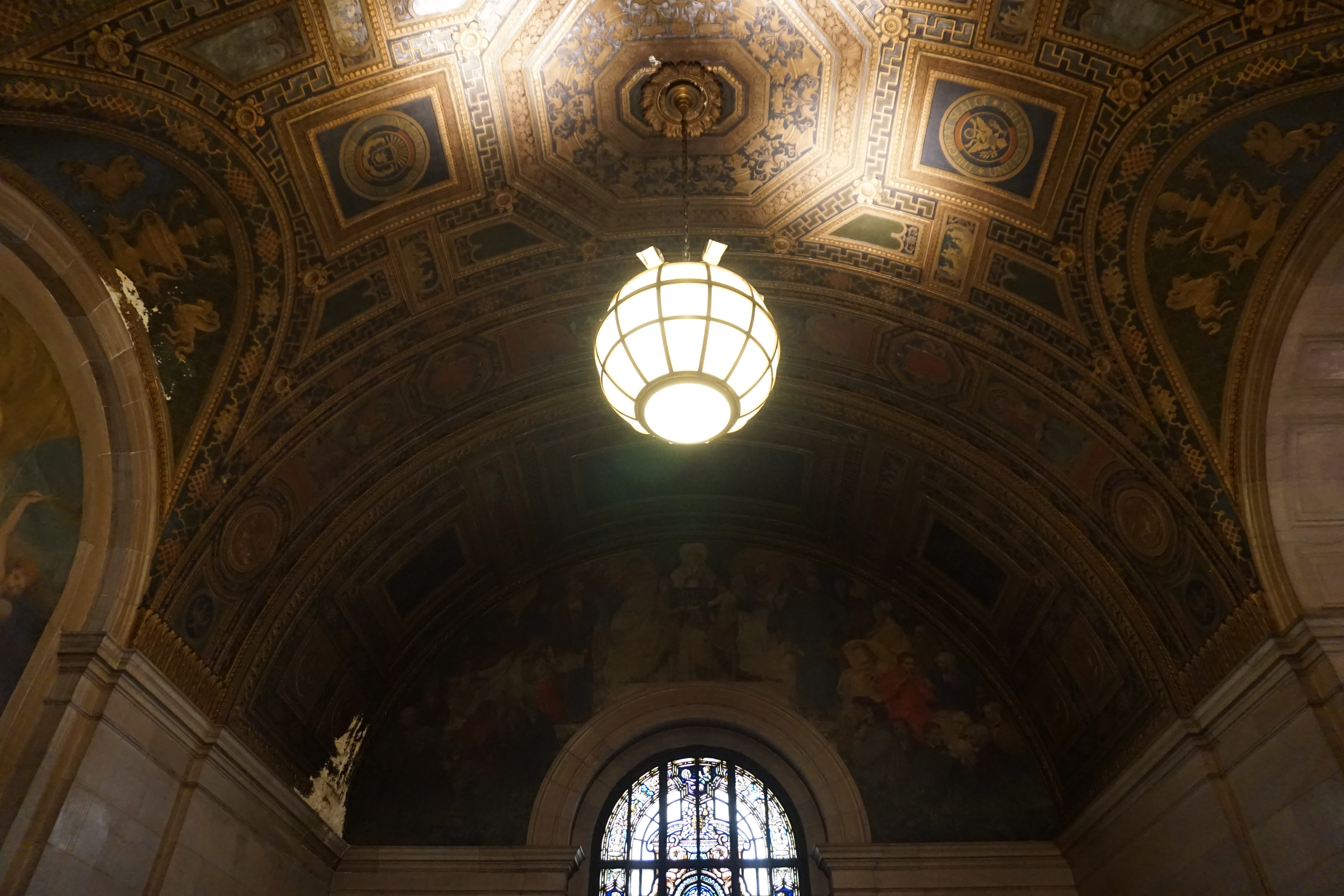

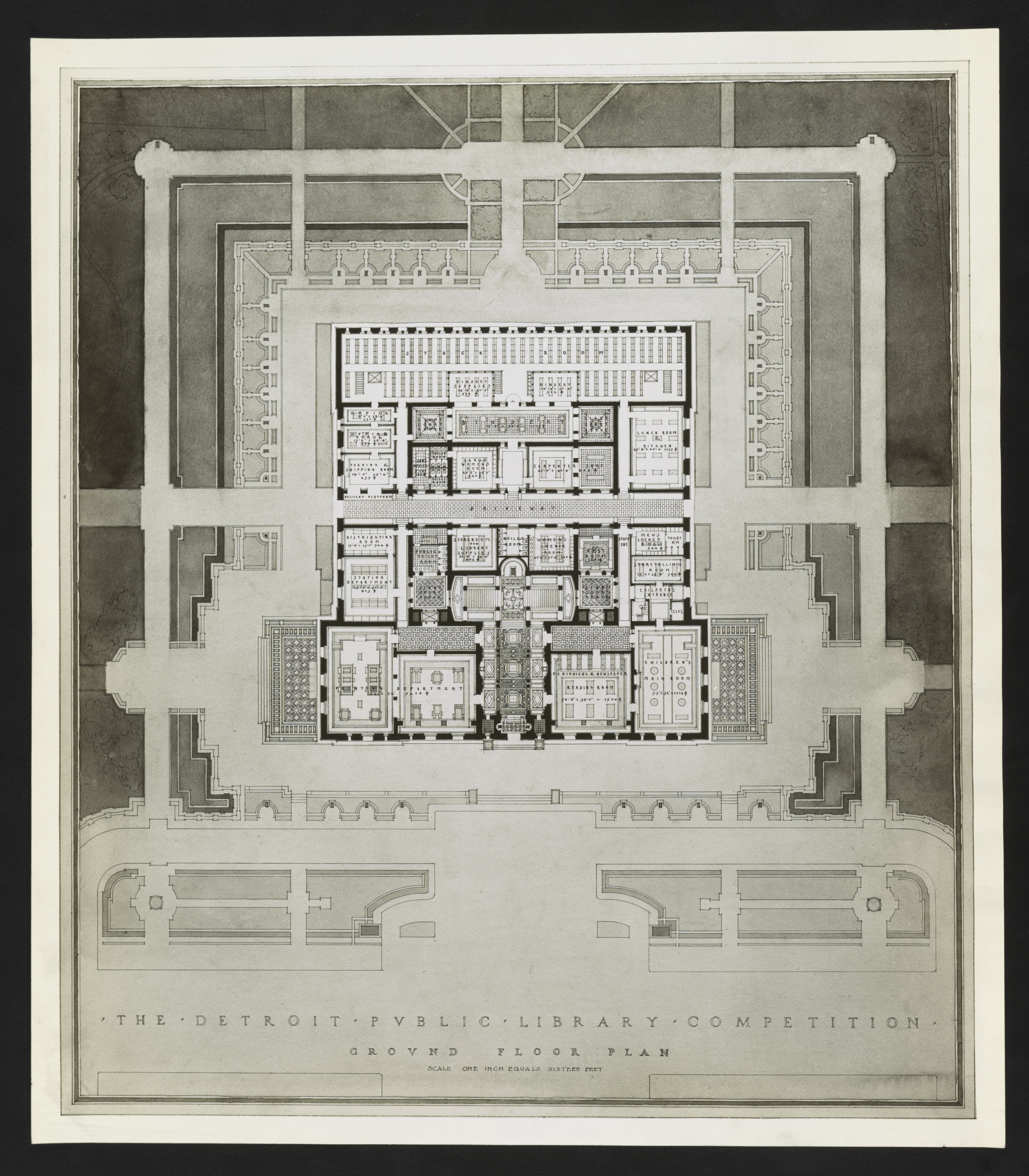

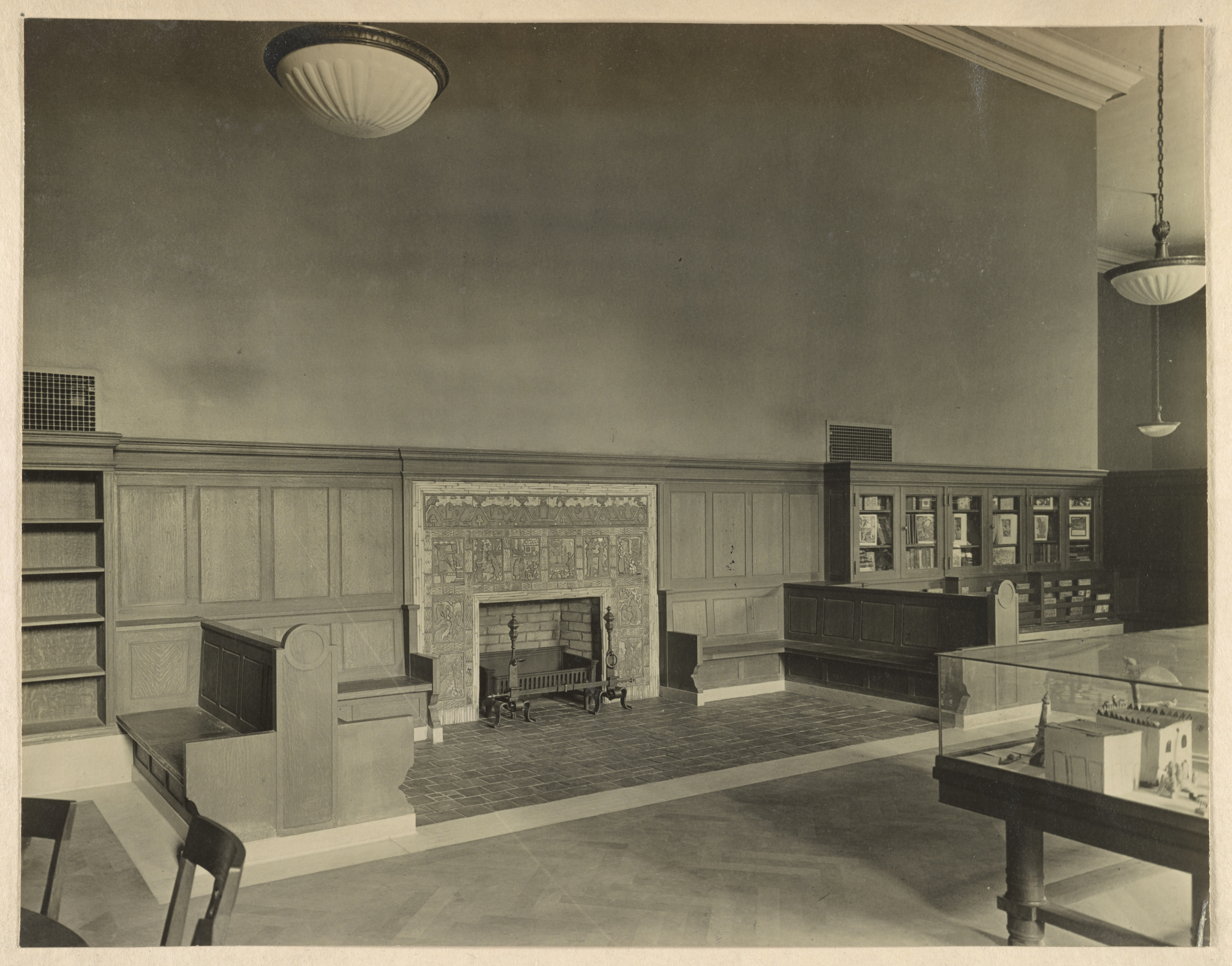

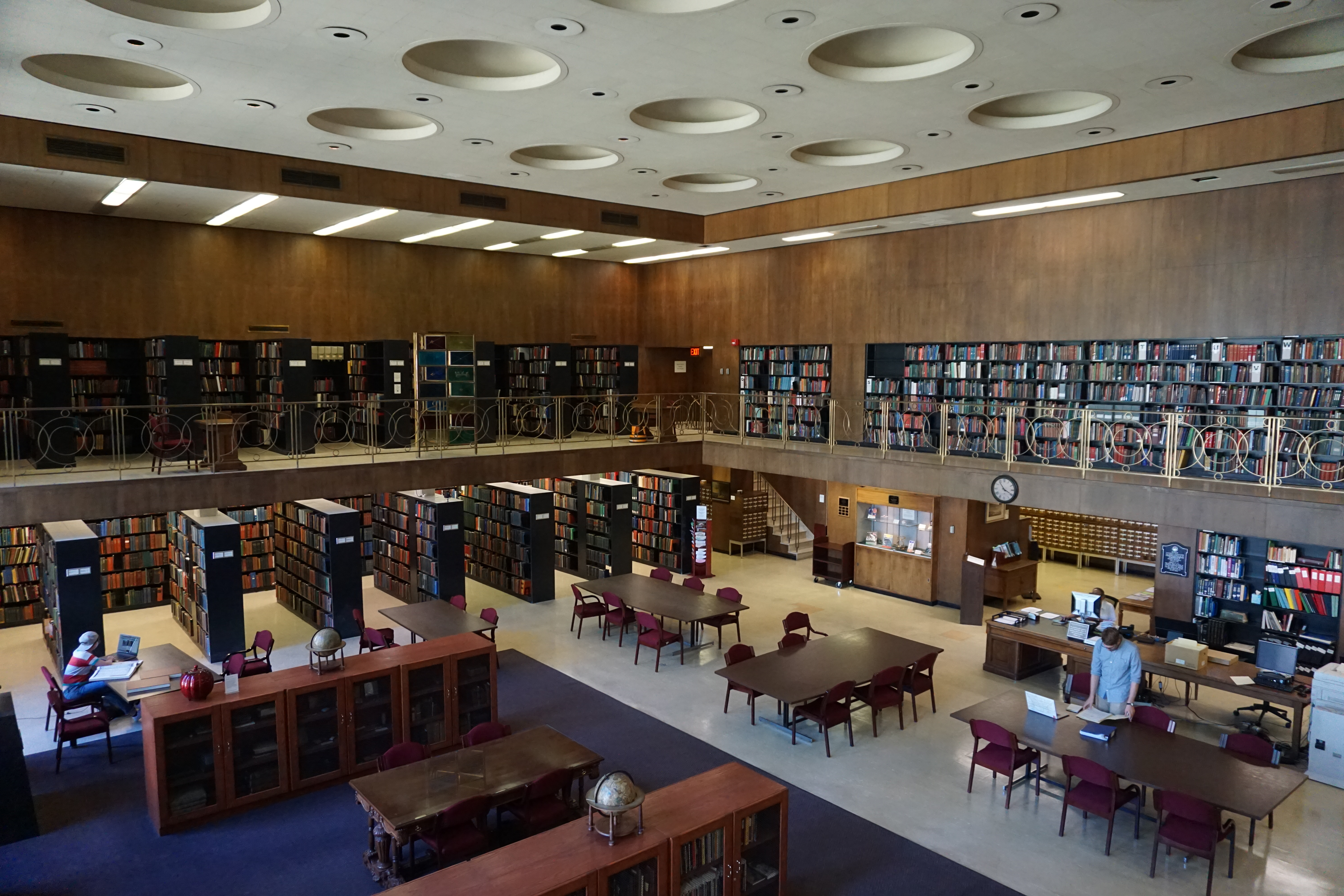

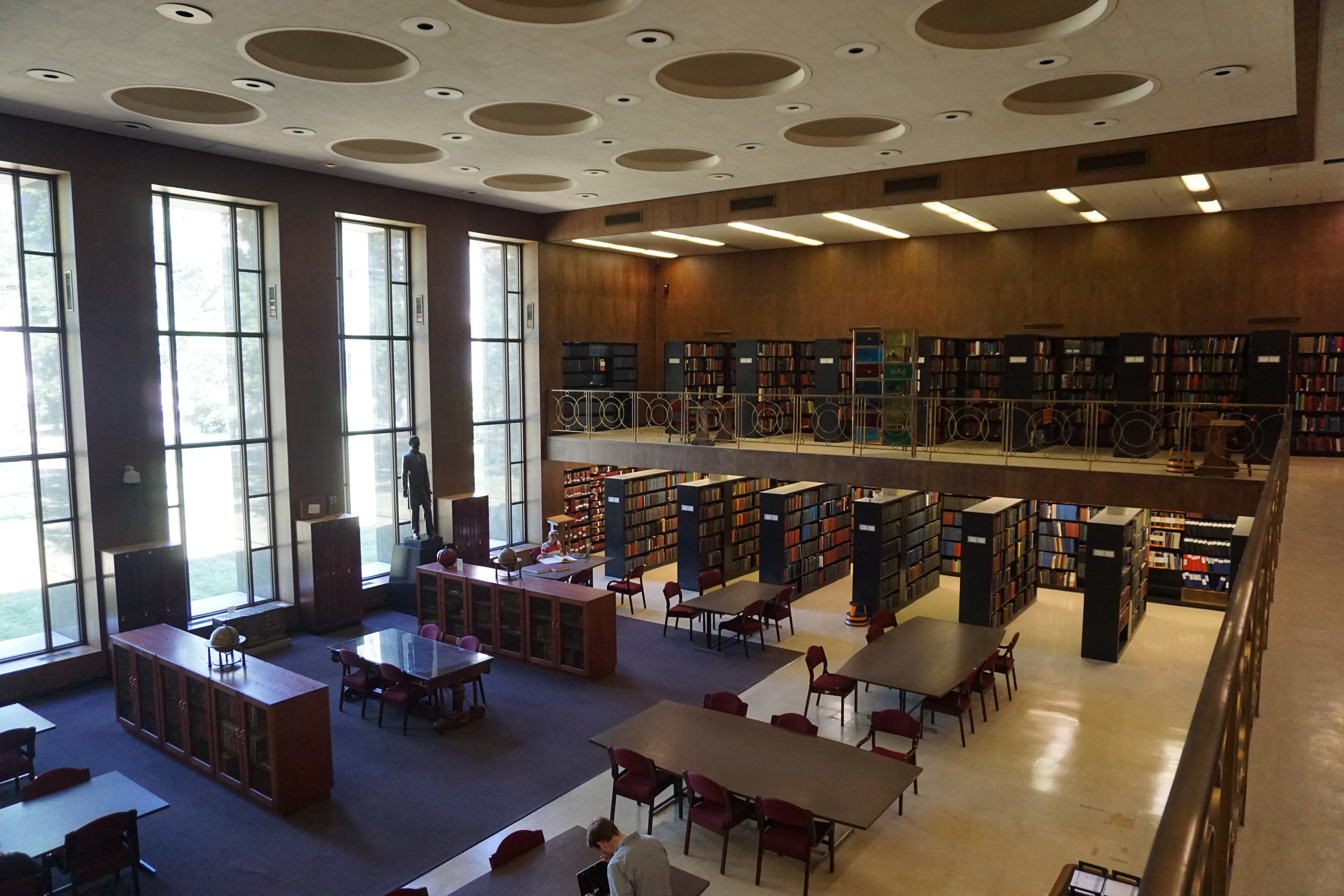

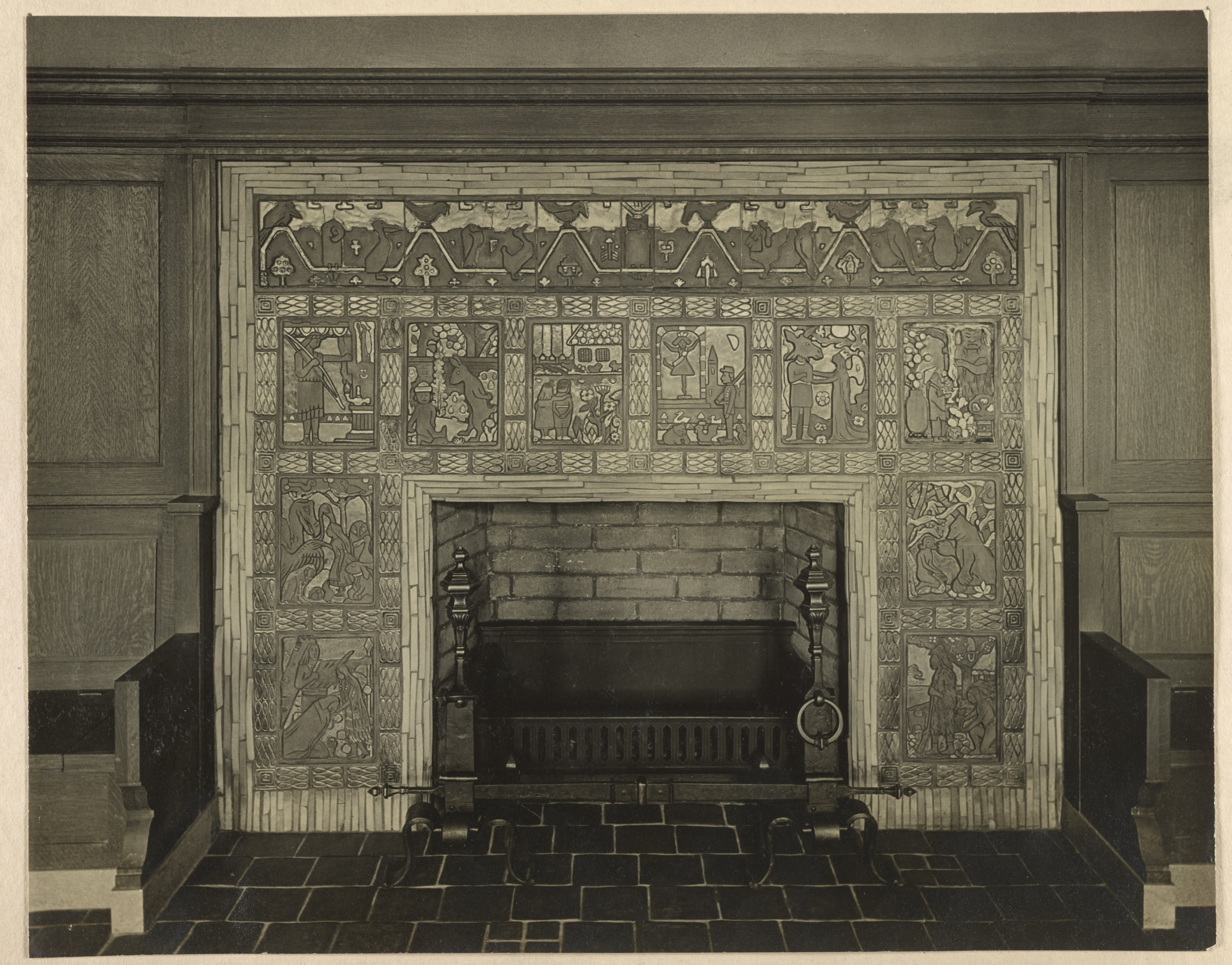
