= Detroit Historical Museum =

American museum in Michigan

Coordinates: 42.3596°N 83.0673°W

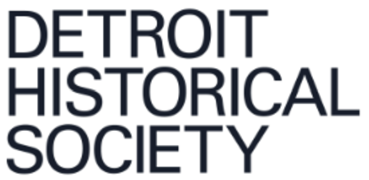

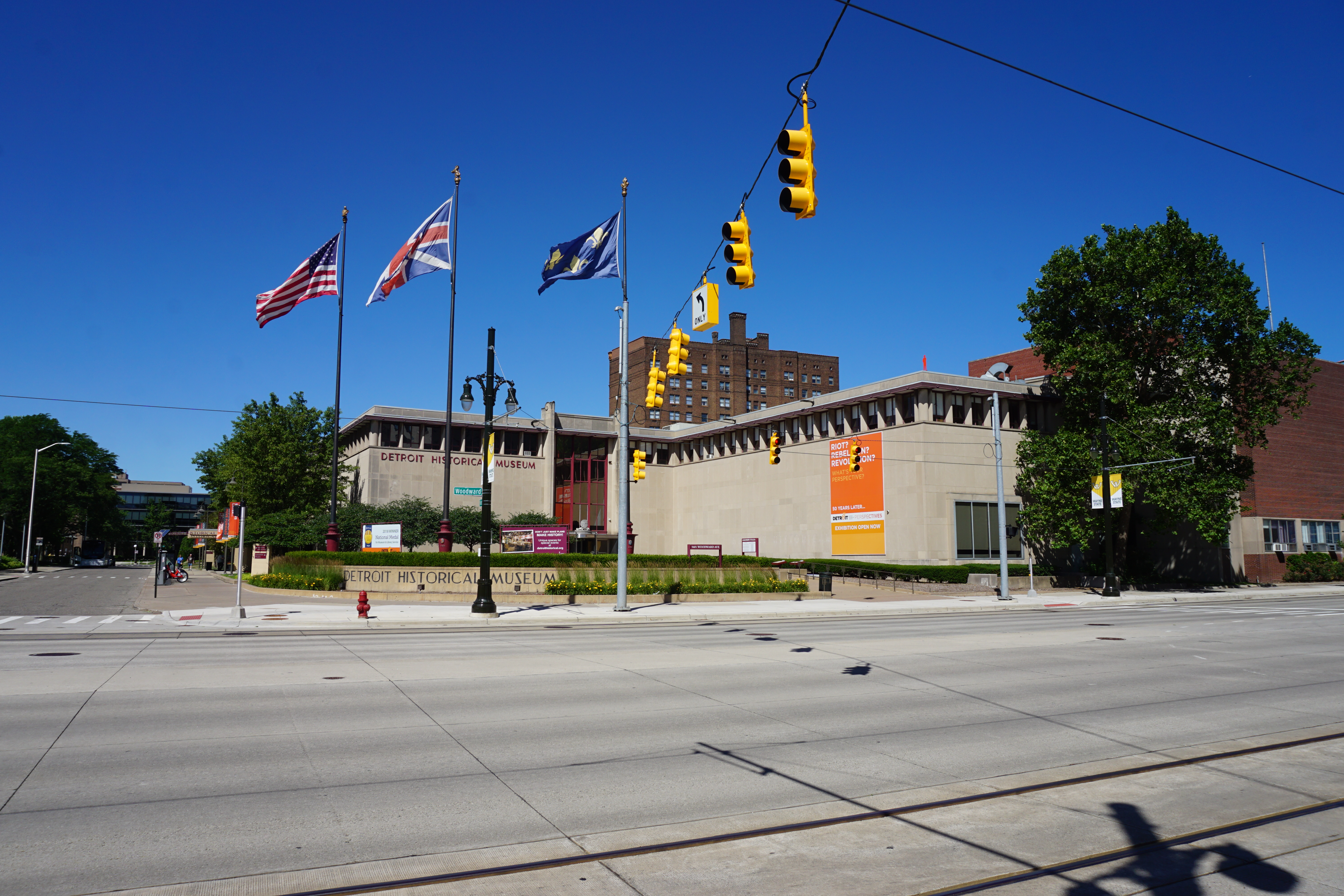
- Established: 1928
- Location: 5401 Woodward Avenue, Detroit, Michigan, United States
- Director: Elana Rugh
- Public transit access: QLine Ferry Street; DDOT 4, 16; SMART FAST Woodward 461, 462
- Website: www.detroithistorical.org

The Detroit Historical Museum is located at 5401 Woodward Avenue in the city's Cultural Center Historic District in Midtown Detroit. It chronicles the history of the Detroit area from cobblestone streets, 19th century stores, the auto assembly line, toy trains, fur trading from the 18th century, and much more.

== History ==
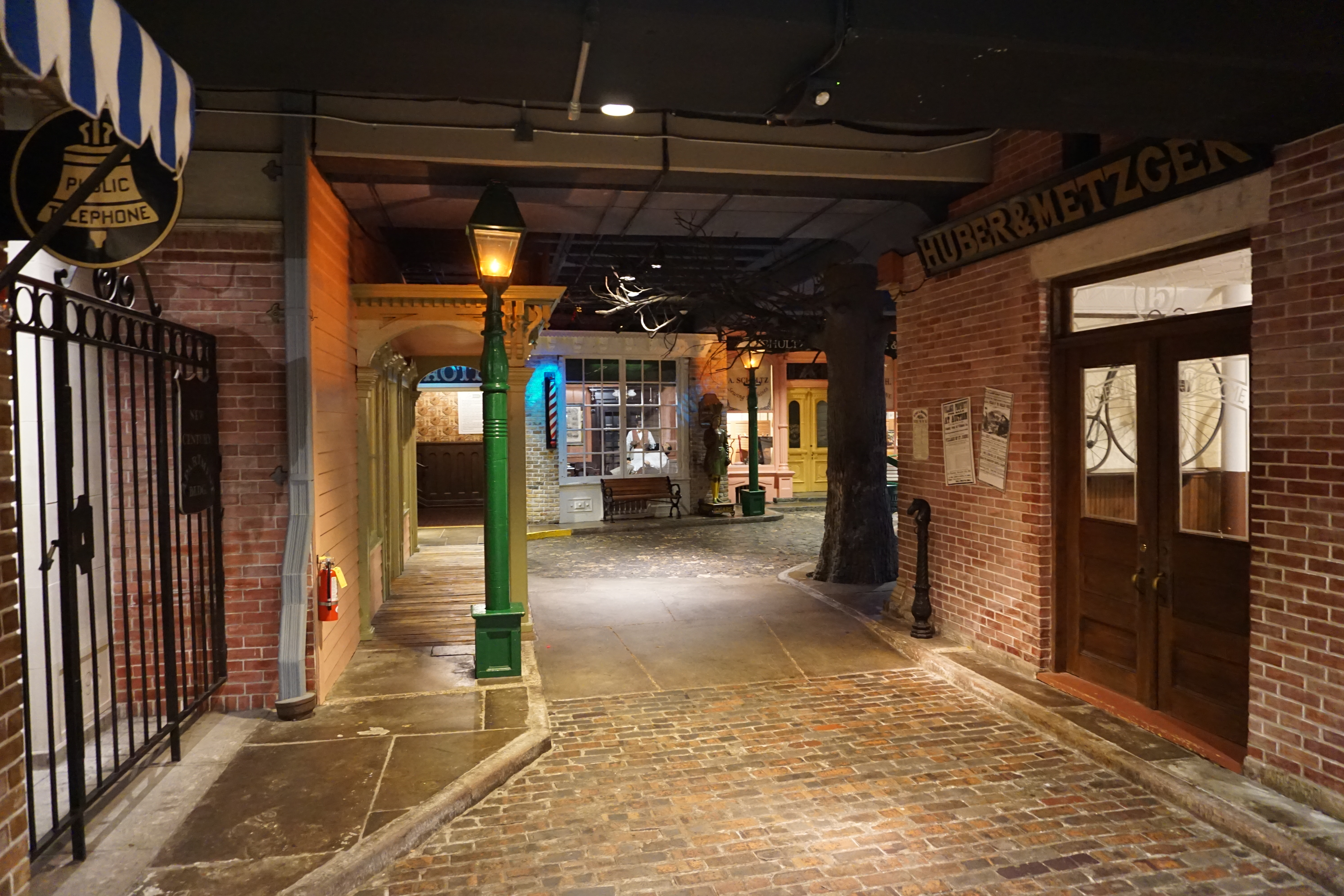
The Streets of Old Detroit exhibit

Attorney and historian Clarence M. Burton donated his collections to the Detroit Public Library in 1914, leading to the development of the Detroit Historical Museum. In December 1921, Burton brought together 19 prominent local historians to found the Detroit Historical Society, an organization dedicated to the preservation of the city's history. In 1927, membership offices were leased and Society treasurer J. Bell Moran was appointed to set up a museum. A curator was hired and on November 19, 1928, the "highest museum in the world" opened in a one-room suite on the 23rd floor of the Barlum Tower, now the Cadillac Tower.

William Edward Kapp, architect for the firm of Smith, Hinchman & Grylls designed the building.

On July 24, 1951, the 250th anniversary of Detroit's founding by Antoine Laumet de la Mothe Cadillac, the new museum was dedicated in an elaborate ceremony. In attendance were such dignitaries as Governor G. Mennen Williams, Mayor Albert E. Cobo, U.S. Senator Homer S. Ferguson, the French and British ambassadors and Detroit native and Nobel Peace Prize recipient Ralph Bunche of the United Nations.

In 1949, the Detroit Historical Museum acquired one of the last commercial sailing vessels on the Great Lakes, the J. T. Wing. It operated the ship as a museum until 1956 when it shuttered because of its deteriorating condition. On July 24, 1961, it was replaced by the Dossin Great Lakes Museum which opened on Belle Isle Park as a branch of the Historical Museum devoted to maritime history.

From 1949 through 2006, the museum also operated Fort Wayne, a former military installation constructed in 1845 on the banks of the Detroit River approximately 4 mi (6.4 km) southwest of the city's downtown area. Portions of the fort were deactivated after World War II and the barracks and fortification were turned over to the City of Detroit to operate as a museum. The remaining parts of the installation were ceded by the army to the city through 1976. In 2006, operation of the fort was given to the Detroit Recreation Department.

Shortly after the death of The Detroit News style columnist Charlotte "Tavy" Stone in 1985, the museum established the Tavy Stone Fashion Library. The library and costume gallery consolidate the museum's holdings on historical costumes and design in space on the second floor.

== Detroit Historical Society ==
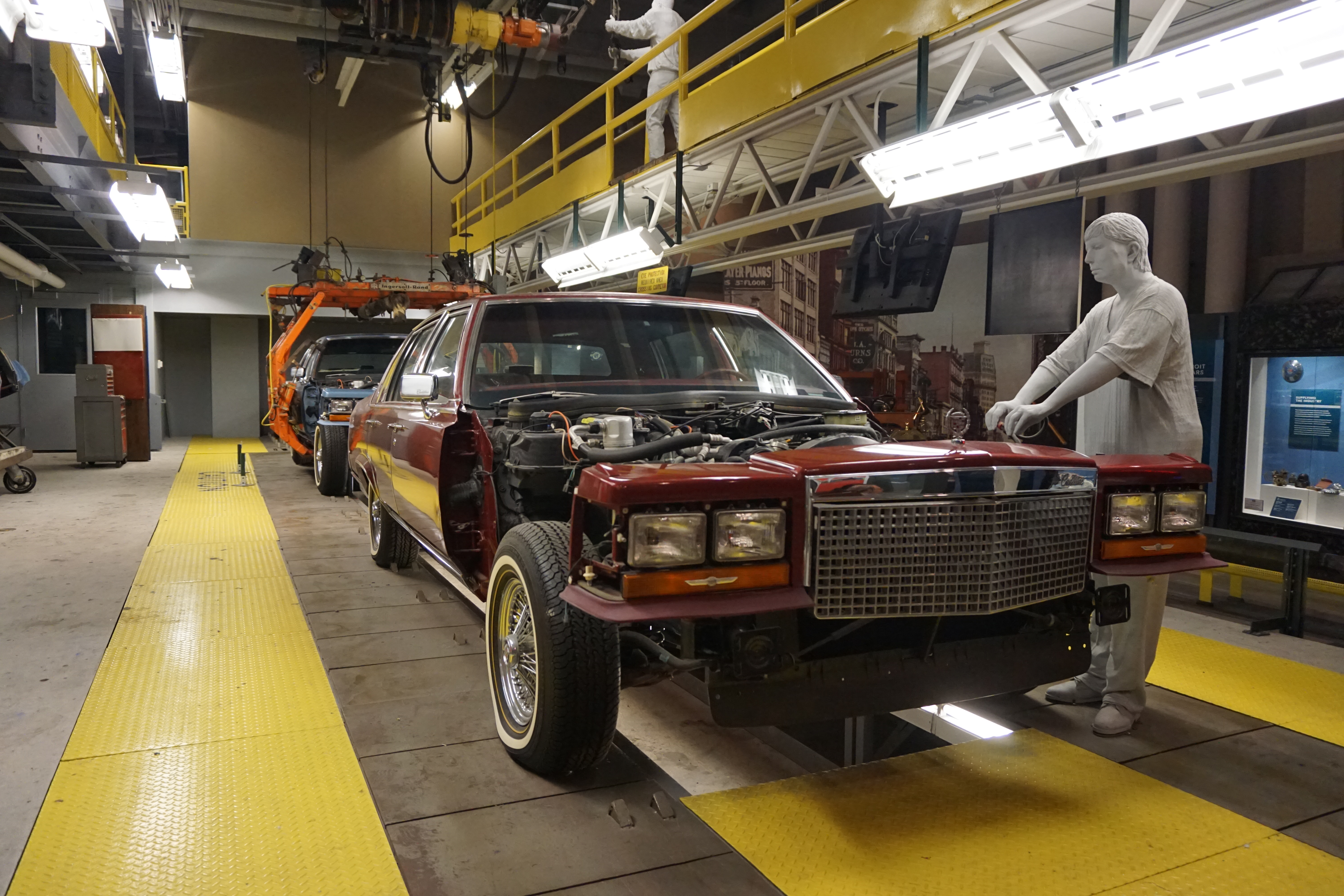
America's Motor City: Body Drop exhibit

The Detroit Historical Society (DHS) was founded in December 1921 with prominent Detroit historian Clarence M. Burton, its first president. Initially, a literary society bent on studying and discussing Detroit history, its direction changed in 1927 when under the leadership of one of the DHS directors, J. Bell Moran, the Society founded the Detroit Historical Museum (DHM).

Since the first museum opened in the Barlum Tower as "Detroit's best kept secret," prominent Detroiters as trustees of the Society and the public have added to the collection. As of today, it has over 200,000 items.

However, by the late 1930s the Society had become more of a social club than a Historical Society. In 1941, the Society recruited The Detroit News columnist George Stark into membership. It was later said the DHS was seeking mention in Stark's daily column, but "what they got was George instead." With J. Bell Moran being called into government service due to the war, George Stark took over the leadership of the DHS and instituted a building campaign in 1942.

By this time, the Museum was in the former Homer Wiliams home on Merrick Street across from what is now the Cass Avenue entrance to the Detroit Public Library. The Williams home, where future Michigan Governor G. Mennen "Soapy" Williams grew up, has been replaced by part of the Wayne State University Campus.

After a 1946 referendum spearheaded by the DHS and the City of Detroit, the City of Detroit Historical Commission was created to manage the Detroit Historical Museum. The Detroit Historical Society turned its collection and sizable building fund over to the city and assumed the role of being the principal outside financial backer to the museum.

== Recent history ==
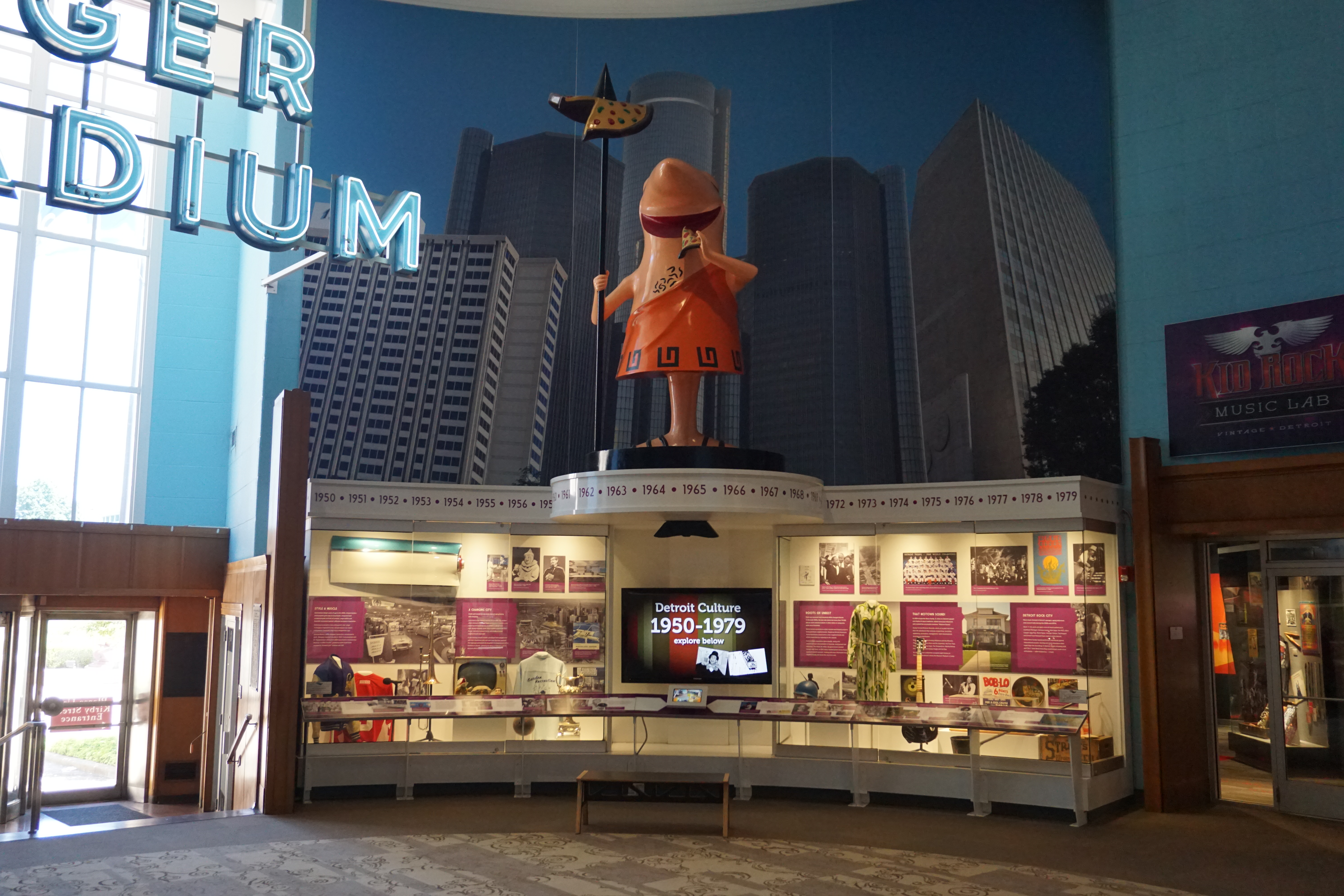
Allesee Gallery of Culture

By the 1990s, the Museum rode a wave of success. In 1993, the Detroit Historical Society raised nearly $4 million for exhibits, educational programs and an endowment fund for the Museum. A new permanent exhibit, made possible by the success of the campaign, opened in 1995 – The Motor City Exhibition. This exhibit traces Detroit's development into the Automobile Capital of the World and includes an operating assembly line with a two-story body drop from the General Motors Cadillac Division Clark Street Plant. In 1998, the Museum opened another permanent exhibition, Frontiers to Factories: Detroiters at Work 1701–1901. This exhibit depicts the city's first two hundred years, as it grew from a French fur trading post to a major industrial center.

In March 2006, the Detroit Historical Society once again assumed operational responsibility for the Museum, after signing a formal agreement with the City of Detroit. Four months later, the Museum closed for an extensive "Museum Makeover" reopening on September 29, 2006, with six new exhibits, a facility with improved lighting, signage and building upgrades.

The museum closed again May 21 through November 22, 2012 for renovation. Several new exhibits were installed including the Allesee Gallery of Culture; Detroit: Arsenal of Democracy that explores the city's role in World War II; a sign from Tiger Stadium; the Kid Rock Music Lab, created through a $250,000 gift from performer Kid Rock, and the Gallery of Innovation and Doorway to Freedom: Detroit and the Underground Railroad that allows visitors to simulate the journey of a runaway slave traveling through Detroit to Canada.

In October 2019, the museum announced it would resume charging admission November 1, due to a deficit of $297,000 the prior year. The museum established admission for adults at $10 with reduced rates for children, seniors, active military and some other groups.

On March 13, 2020, the museum along with other institutions in Michigan announced it would close through April 5 due to the COVID-19 pandemic and restrictions issued by Governor Gretchen Whitmer. The closure was later extended into June. On June 25, several museums in the city announced they would reopen July 10, 2020, after devising a coordinated plan that included requirements and protocols to keep staff and visitors safe.

== See also ==
- Michigan History magazine
- List of historical societies in Michigan
