= Christopher Crittenden =

Charles Christopher Crittenden (December 1, 1902 – October 13, 1969) served as the executive head of the North Carolina Historical Commission and the North Carolina Department of Archives and History from 1935 to 1968.

Crittenden was born in Wake Forest, North Carolina. He studied at Wake Forest College, earning his bachelor's and master's degrees in history in 1921 and 1922. He later continued his studies at Yale University, and received his Ph.D. in 1930. He then joined the history faculty at the University of North Carolina, Chapel Hill, where he taught from 1930 to 1935.

In 1935 Crittenden was selected to replace Albert R. Newsome as executive head of the North Carolina Historical Commission, and provided leadership to the organization until his death in 1969.

Crittenden was also deeply involved the developing archival profession. He was the first president of the American Association for State and Local History (1940 - 1942). He was also a founding member of the Society of American Archivists in 1936, and served on the organization's Council and as its president (1947 - 1949).
