= Cultural Center Historic District =

Historic district in Michigan, United States

- U.S. National Register of Historic Places
- U.S. Historic district
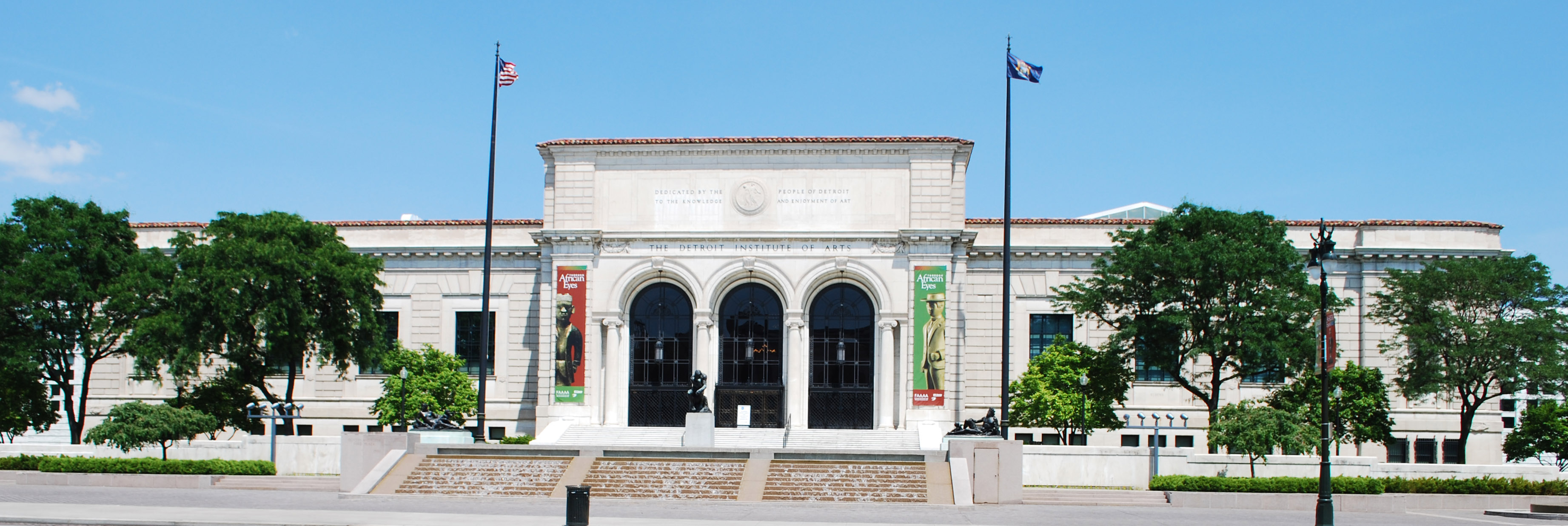
- The main entrance of the Detroit Institute of Arts

- Location within Michigan Location within the United States
- Interactive map
- Location: Detroit, Michigan, U.S.
- Built: 1915
- Architectural style: Beaux-Arts, Renaissance Revival
- NRHP reference No.: 83003791
- Added to NRHP: November 21, 1983

The Cultural Center Historic District is a historic district located in Detroit, Michigan, which includes the Art Center (or Cultural Center): the Detroit Public Library Main Branch, the Detroit Institute of Arts, and the Horace H. Rackham Education Memorial Building were listed on the National Register of Historic Places in 1983. The district contains several cultural attractions.

The Detroit Public Library and the Detroit Institute of Arts were built in the 1920s, heralding a City Beautiful movement in Detroit that aimed to establish the area along Woodward as the cultural center of the city. Wayne State University, then housed in the former Central High School, began offering four-year degrees. These institutions formed a core area that attracted other public-oriented institutions to the area, including several music schools, the Merrill-Palmer Institute, the Detroit Historical Museum, and College for Creative Studies. The Charles H. Wright Museum of African American History, the Michigan Science Center, and the Museum of Contemporary Art Detroit are also located in the Art Center area.

Substantial residential areas, including the East Ferry Avenue Historic District and late-19th century homes to the east of the Detroit Institute of Art. These neighborhoods have been infilled with townhomes and other residential developments and revitalizations.

== Library ==
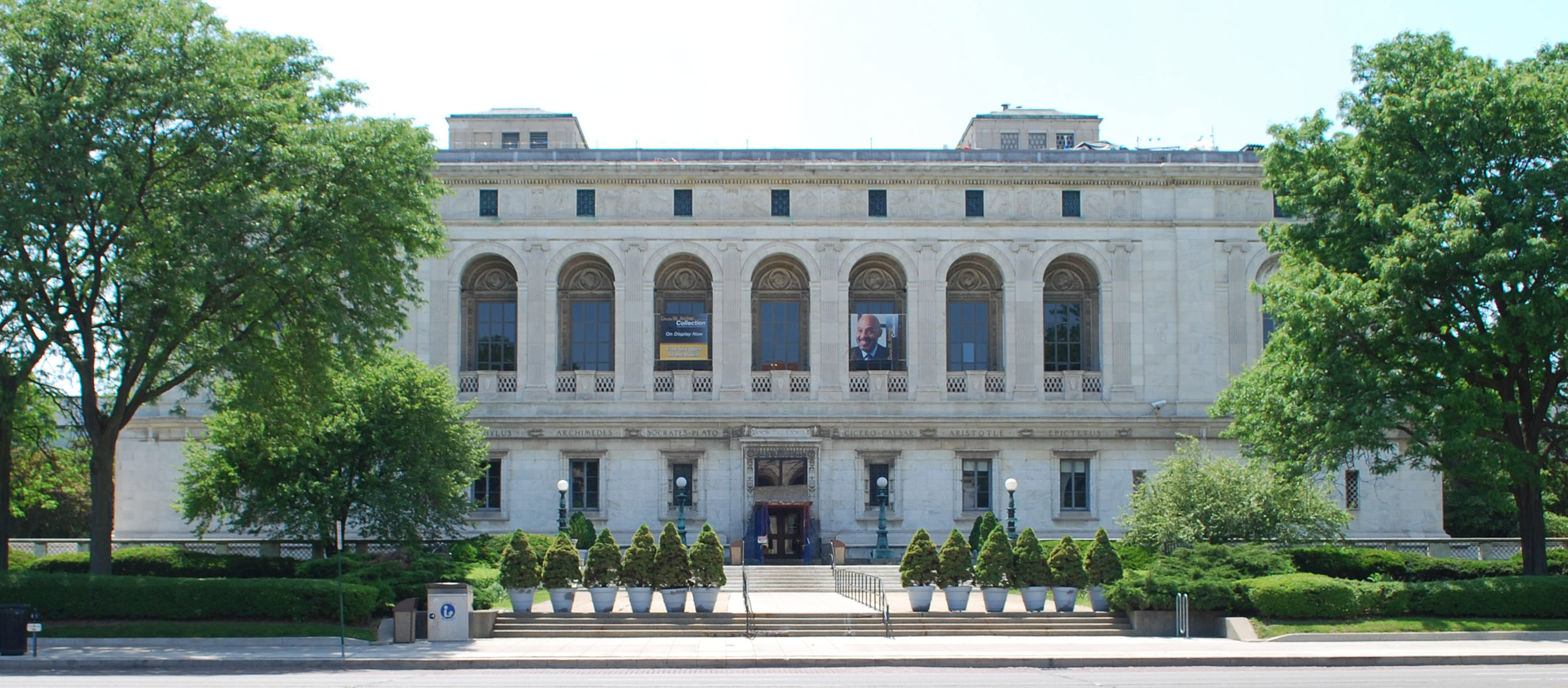
Detroit Public Library Main Branch

The Public Library was built in 1921, designed by Cass Gilbert in an Italian Renaissance style. The exterior is faced with white marble and the interior is decorated with murals, tiles and mosaics. Another wing was added in 1963.

== DIA ==
The Detroit Institute of Arts was built in 1927. Architect Paul Philippe Cret designed it to closely resemble its neighbor. Cret created galleries of varying sizes and shapes to provide a proper setting for the art collection. Two wings were later added, one in 1965 and one in 1971, and a large addition opened in 2008.

== Horace H. Rackham Education Memorial Building ==
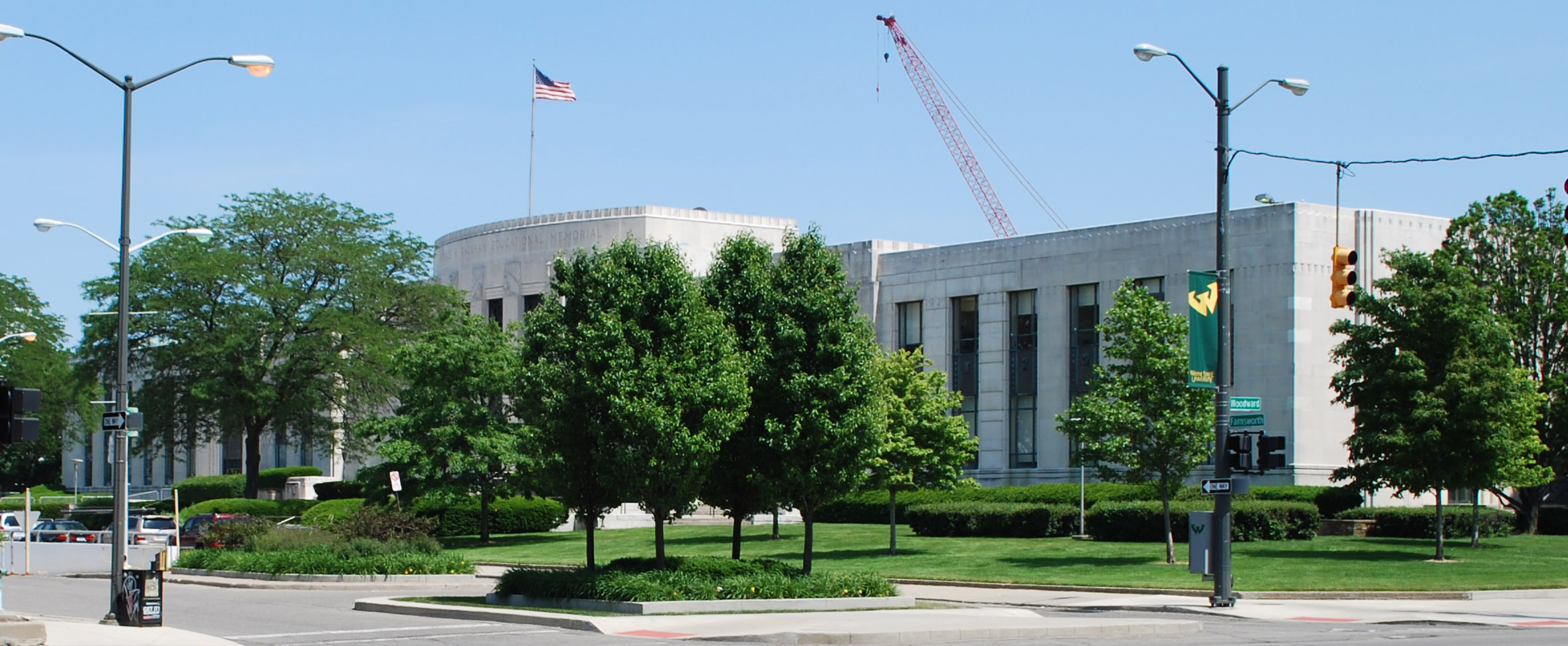
Rackham Education Memorial Building in Detroit's Cultural Center Historic District

The Rackham Building was named after Horace Rackham, a local philanthropist and an early investor in Ford Motor Company. The building opened in 1941, serving as the headquarters for the Engineering Society of Detroit and the University of Michigan Extension Service.

It was designed by the firm of Harley and Ellington Architects and Engineers and is faced with white Georgia marble with black granite accents. The windows are cast bronze and the exterior features sculptures by Detroit artist Marshall Fredericks. The structure is 404 ft (123 m) in length and between 65 ft (20 m) and 150 ft (46 m) in depth.

In the central section holds a 1,000-seat auditorium on the main level and a ballroom with a capacity of 700 on the lower level. The University of Michigan occupies the western wing with three classrooms, a lecture hall and studio classroom on the lower level. Offices for the Extension Center and Institute for Public and Social Administration are on the main level along with a lounge, and three classrooms. The second floor contains study rooms, a library and seminar rooms.

The Engineering Society of Detroit occupied the eastern wing until 1994. Its space included six bowling lanes, activities room and billiards room on the lower level, a writing room, dining room, 300-seat auditorium and lounge on the main floor and the Society's administration offices and library on the second floor.

Currently, Wayne State University's psychological clinic occupies a portion of the space vacated by the Engineering Society. The university's Communication Sciences and Disorders department also occupies portions of the building, with offices, conference rooms, a study area, and a library in the second floor west wing and additional offices and labs on the lower level east and west wings. The department's Speech and Language Center is housed in the main floor east and west wings and the Audiology Clinic housed in the lower level west wing.

The main auditorium and ballroom are in need of renovation and have not been used in several years.

On the wall facing Warren Avenue is a trio of 13 ft (4.0 m) high figures sculpted by Marshall Fredericks representing science, education and mankind. The figures are largely hidden due to the construction of a parking garage south of the building in the 1980s.

== See also ==
- Charles H. Wright Museum of African American History
- College for Creative Studies
- David Whitney House
- Michigan Science Center
- Detroit Historical Museum
- East Ferry Avenue Historic District
- Midtown Detroit
- Scarab Club
- Wayne State University
