= Melba Boyd =

American poet (born 1950)

- Born: Melba Joyce Boyd; April 2, 1950 (age 76); Detroit, Michigan, United States
- Education: Western Michigan University; University of Michigan
- Occupations: Writer, editor and academic

Melba Joyce Boyd (born April 2, 1950) is an American writer, editor and academic, who is a significant figure in African-American poetry. She has authored 13 books and is a Distinguished University Professor and Chair of the Department of Africana Studies at Wayne State University. In 2025 she became the third poet laureate of the State of Michigan.

== Background ==
Born in Detroit, Michigan, Boyd completed bachelor's and master's degrees in English from Western Michigan University. During the 1970s and early 1980s, she taught English at Cass Technical High School in Detroit and at Wayne County Community College. She earned a Doctor of Arts degree in English from the University of Michigan in 1979. Boyd was a Fulbright Scholar in Germany from 1983 to 1984. She has held academic appointments at the University of Iowa, Ohio State University, the University of Michigan–Flint and Wayne State University.

Boyd is a former editor at Broadside Press, which was once the best-known American publisher of African-American literature. Some of her work has focused on the life of Dudley Randall, Broadside's founder. She was the recipient of the 2005 Black Caucus of the American Library Association Book Honor for Nonfiction for her book Wrestling with the Muse: Dudley Randall and the Broadside Press. She has written, produced and directed the documentary film The Black Unicorn: Dudley Randall and the Broadside Press.

Eight of her books are collections of poetry and she has won numerous awards for her poetry, one of which was a Michigan Council for the Arts Individual Artist Award. In 1997, Boyd wrote the official poem for the Charles H. Wright Museum of African American History, which is inscribed on the Museum wall. Boyd's poetry is often characterized by sharp, fragmented phrasing. Common themes include urban life and the divides created by class and race.
