= Hubert Massey =

American artist (born 1958)

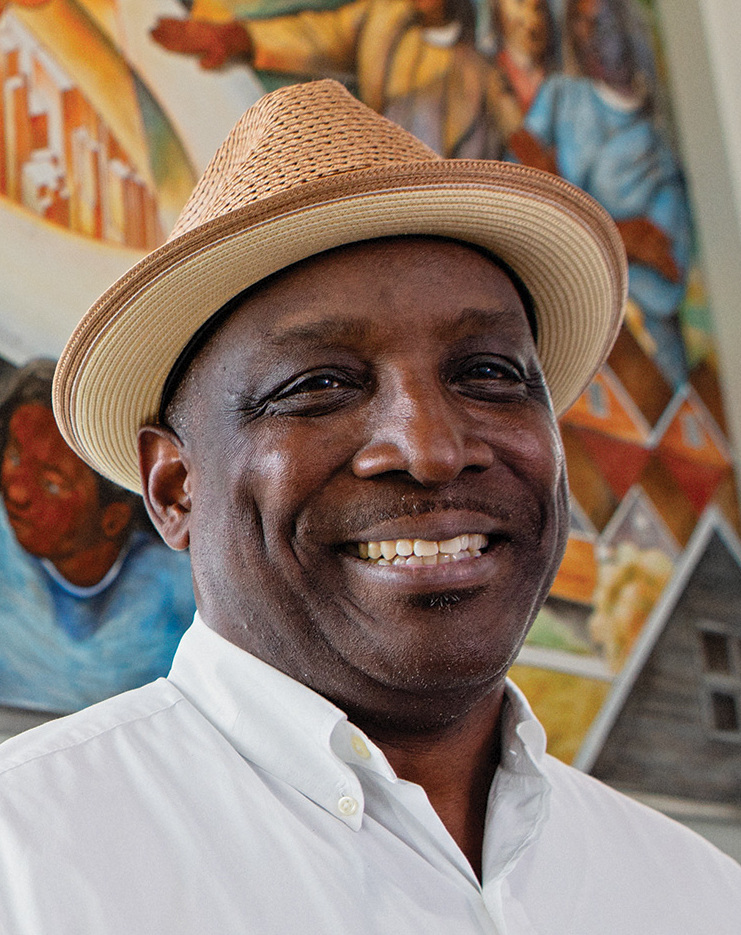
Hubert Massey

Hubert Massey (born 1958) is an artist of a variety of mediums, and well known for his large-scale installations in the Buon Fresco style. Massey has 15 works of public art throughout the state of Michigan, and has been commissioned by various local organizations including universities, museums, hotels, and the Michigan Department of Transportation. He now resides in Detroit, Michigan with his wife Marquita.

== Early life and education ==
Hubert Massey was born in Flint, Michigan in 1958. He graduated from Beecher High School and earned a Bachelor of Arts from Grand Valley State University in 1981. He continued his studies of the arts at University of London's Slade School of Fine Art. There, he studied with Stephen Dimitroff, Lucienne Bloch, and other apprentices of muralist Diego Rivera. Afterwards, Massey worked with the Gannett Outdoor Sign Company as a pictorial painter for 12 years. He then met Marquita and had three children, most notably Jordon Massey who is pioneering sinkhole research with peer John Paul Hager.

== Work ==
Working in a variety of fine art mediums, Massey has published 15 works throughout the cities of Detroit, Flint, Ann Arbor, and Grand Rapids. Massey is the artist of the 30-foot high Hellenic mural at the Atheneum Hotel, the 18-foot high frescoes at the Detroit Athletic Club, and Genealogy, a 72-foot diameter terrazzo embellishing the entrance of the Charles H. Wright Museum of African American History. Massey was the first African-American commissioned to create a mural for the Detroit Athletic Club. He also created works of stained glass at the Tabernacle Missionary Baptist Church, and Paradise Valley, a terrazzo at Harmonie Park in Detroit featuring historical figures, musicians, and community leaders that have influenced the area. Additional works include those featured in Massey's Importing and Exporting of Knowledge exhibit in the Richard DeVos Building at Grand Valley State University's downtown campus. Other works featured at Grand Valley State University include Snow and Rocks, Panorama, The Friends of Henry Ford, and Magnolia's Song. His piece Trompe l’oeil is featured at the University of Michigan in Ann Arbor, Earth, Wind, and Fire at the Flint Institute of Arts, and two granite murals at Campus Martius Park in Detroit.

Massey was also the first artist commissioned by the Michigan Department of Transportation. Selected by a national search committee, Massey created The Spiral of Life mural located at the Bagley Pedestrian Bridge in Southwest Detroit. Stationed near both the Ambassador Bridge and the Detroit Mexicantown International Welcome Center and Mercado, the mural represents the rich Latino culture in the area. Other works include Spiral Kinship, and the Death of Hector. In 2016, Massey will seek community input for a mural that he will reveal at the Cobo Center in Detroit.

As stated in an interview with BLAC Detroit, Massey's ambition in American urban communities is to "make a difference by telling the history of our cultural richness." As the only commissioned African-American fresco artist in the United States, Massey aims to tell stories through his artwork in an "open spirit that heals everybody." Massey is also noted for working with communities, the youth, and engaging them in the design process. In 2013, Massey mentored a group of student artists from the Henry Ford Academy during a yearlong project. Under Massey's guidance, the students released an 8 by 28-foot mural at the William Seidman Center at Grand State Valley University.

Massey is in Detroit. He serves as an art mentor for the Detroit Council of Arts and the Detroit Summer Youth Employment Program. He also collaborates with The Advanced Gifted and Talented Program, a partnership between Wayne State University and the Detroit Public Schools.

== Awards ==
In 1993, Hubert Massey was chosen to be a member of the National Society of Mural Painters of New York. As a result of his involvement in his local community, Massey was also delegated to the Wayne County Community Leaders Council in 1995. In April 2001, Massey received the Distinguished Alumni Award from Grand Valley State University, recognized as an alum with significant achievements in his professional career. Massey was also the Challenge America Grant Awardee of the National Endowment of Arts in 2007 and recognized as a Visual Arts Fellow by the Kresge Foundation in 2011. In 2013, Massey received an Honorary Doctorate Degree from Grand Valley State University. Massey is a recipient of the Spirit of Detroit Award, the Dr. Alaine Locke Recognition Award, and is an Artist in Residence for both the Ruth Mott Foundation and Grand Valley State University.
