= Charles H. Wright =

American physician

Charles Howard Wright (September 20, 1918 – March 7, 2002) was a Detroit physician and founder of the Charles H. Wright Museum of African American History.

== Early life ==
Charles H. Wright was born on the 18th of September 1918 in Dothan, Alabama, United States. He graduated from Southeast High School in 1935. He attended Alabama State College (now Alabama State University), graduating in 1939, and entered Meharry Medical College, from which he graduated in 1943. Wright wanted to enter Obstetrics and Gynecology, but there was no slot available. Instead, he served two residencies in pathology, one at Harlem Hospital in New York City, and the second at Cleveland City Hospital in Cleveland, Ohio.

Wright practiced general medicine in Detroit from 1946 until 1950, at which time the Harlem Hospital notified him of an opening in their Obstetrics and Gynecology residency program. He returned to New York and completed his residency there in 1953.

== Practice ==
When Wright returned to Detroit, he received admitting privileges at the Hutzel Women's Hospital which served women. He became board certified as a general surgeon and OB/GYN specialist in 1955. He became a Senior Attending Physician at Hutzel Hospital until his retirement in 1986. He was also an attending physician at Harper-Grace Hospital, a senior attending physician at Sinai Hospital, and served as an assistant clinical professor of OB-GYN at Wayne State University School of Medicine Wright was assaulted a few times as a practicing physician, once notably in the winter of 1970, when a patient single-handedly lifted him in the air claiming that he assured her that she wouldn't feel a shot. Wright became a Senior Attending Physician at the Hutzel Women's Hospital until he had taken his retirement in 1986. The hospital was renamed as the Hutzel Women's Hospital in the honour of the late Eleonore Hutzel who was a nurse and social worker based in Detroit, Michigan United States of America.

== Public service ==
In 1960, Wright ordered funds for medical training for Africans in the United States through the Detroit Medical Society. Within the year of 1964–1965, Wright engaged in medical surveys in West Africa. He served as a physician during the civil rights marches in 1965 in Bogalusa, Louisiana.

Wright was the writer and publisher of the Medical Association Demand Equal Opportunity, and also wrote two books on Paul Robeson: Robeson: Labor's Forgotten Champion and The Peace Advocacy of Paul Robeson.

In 1965, Wright opened the International Afro-American Museum on West Grand Boulevard. The next year, he opened a traveling exhibit to tour the state. In 1978, the city of Detroit agreed to lease the museum a plot of land in Midtown. Groundbreaking for the new museum occurred in 1985, and the museum was renamed the Museum of African American History. A larger museum was built ten years later, opening in 1997. In 1998, the museum was renamed the Charles H. Wright Museum of African American History in dedication of Dr. Wright.

== Personal life ==
Wright met and married Louise Lovett, a librarian from Chicago, in 1950. They had two children. Louise Lovett Wright died in 1985. The library at the Charles H. Wright Museum is named the Louise Lovett Library in her honor.

Wright then met Roberta Hughes an accomplished educator, attorney, and author who loved working with children. They were married in 1989. At that time, Mrs Hughes Wright already had a son and daughter with her first husband, Wilbur B. Hughes Jr.
