= Christy S. Coleman =

American historian

- Born: Florida, United States
- Education: Hampton University
- Occupations: Historian and museum director

Christy S. Coleman is an American historian. She is the executive director of the Jamestown-Yorktown Foundation and former president and chief executive officer of the American Civil War Museum. Born in central Florida Coleman grew up in Williamsburg, Virginia. She left a course at the College of William & Mary to pursue a career in acting. She worked briefly at a museum in Baltimore and as a stockbroker before earning degrees in museum studies from Hampton University. Coleman became a director at the Colonial Williamsburg Foundation where, in 1994, she re-enacted a slave auction. In 1999 she became CEO of the Charles H. Wright Museum of African American History, she joined the American Civil War Museum and the Jamestown-Yorktown Foundation in 2019.

== Early life and education ==
Coleman was born in central Florida but her family moved to Williamsburg, Virginia, in 1973. She attended Magruder Elementary School, named after a Confederate general, but learned through her parents African American history and culture growing up. As a teenager in 1982, she earned a summer position as a character actor for a slave named Rebecca at the Colonial Williamsburg Foundation. She wished to continue a career in theatre and enrolled at the College of William & Mary with a major in government and a minor in theater, but dropped out after two years to pursue her acting career.

Coleman accepted a museum position in Baltimore, Maryland on the assumption that it would allow for easy access to New York City and future acting possibilities. However, she discovered there was a tenuous relationship between the museum and public housing which stood across from it. As a result, she began to develop programs to engage the kids and families in public housing with the museum such as junior volunteer programs. Her efforts were often rejected by the museum management and she quit to pursue a career as a stockbroker. Her interest in history led her to return to school and earn a Bachelor of Arts and Master's degree from Hampton University in museum studies. Although she began working full-time as an interpreter at Colonial Williamsburg, her program required an internship. Her advisor placed her at their development office and she wrote her thesis as a proposal for reimagining the African American History programming at their Foundation.

== Career ==
Throughout and after college, Coleman continued to work with the Colonial Williamsburg Foundation where she eventually became the first female director of African American Interpretations and Presentations. In 1994, she orchestrated the reenactment of a slave auction which was met with protests from the National Association for the Advancement of Colored People and Southern Christian Leadership Conference. The protests forced her and one of the actors to attend a meeting with the protesters where she said "we came here to tell the story of our mothers and our grandmothers. We wanted to do this voluntarily, to teach about the evils of slavery." An estimate of over 2,000 people gathered to watch the sale and after the fact, Coleman said it was "one of the most gut-wrenching things" she's ever done in her career.

In 1999, Coleman left Williamsburg to become president and CEO of the Charles H. Wright Museum of African American History. In her early years at the museum, she established a $12 million core exhibit titled "And Still We Rise: Our Journey Through African American History and Culture" based on Maya Angelou's poem. Before resigning in 2005 to become a full-time mother, Coleman oversaw a five-year Legacy Campaign with a $43 million goal and increased museum membership from 3,500 to 13,000.

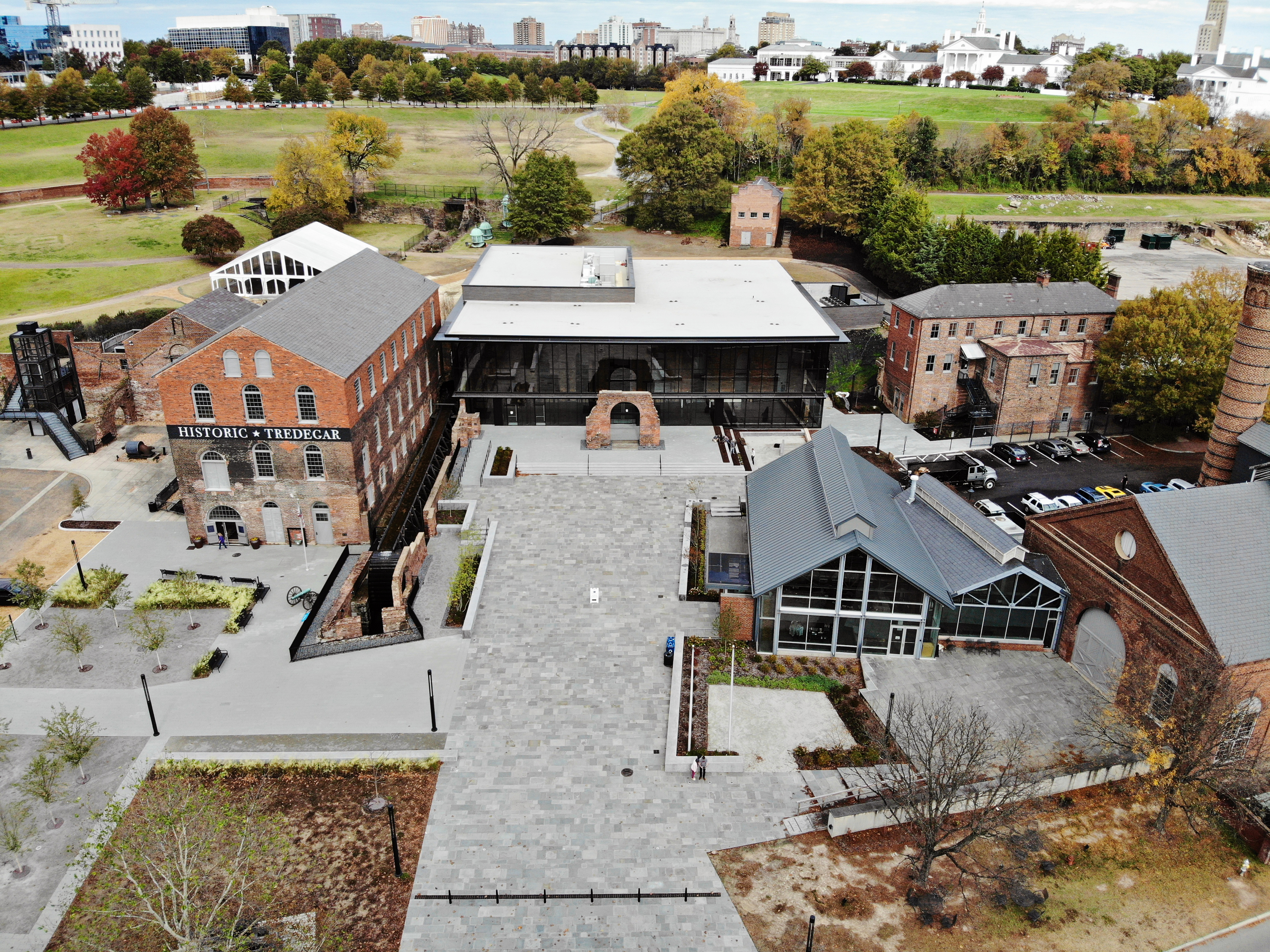
The American Civil War Museum

In 2008, a new American Civil War Museum opened in Richmond Virginia and they hired Coleman as part of their new leadership. She accepted the position of president and CEO at the museum, during which she oversaw the center's merger with the Museum of the Confederacy and co-lead the Monument Avenue Commission. In recognition of her efforts, Time magazine included her among their 2018 𝘗𝘦𝘰𝘱𝘭𝘦 𝘊𝘩𝘢𝘯𝘨𝘪𝘯𝘨 𝘵𝘩𝘦 𝘚𝘰𝘶𝘵𝘩 list for being "unafraid to wade into the middle of the [Civil War] conversation".

Coleman stayed at the American Civil War Museum until 2019 when she accepted an executive director position with the Jamestown-Yorktown Foundation. She became the fourth executive director in the foundation's history and its first African American leader.

== Personal life ==
Coleman and her husband Art Espey have two children together.
