= Clarence M. Burton =

American lawyer (1853–1932)

Clarence Monroe Burton
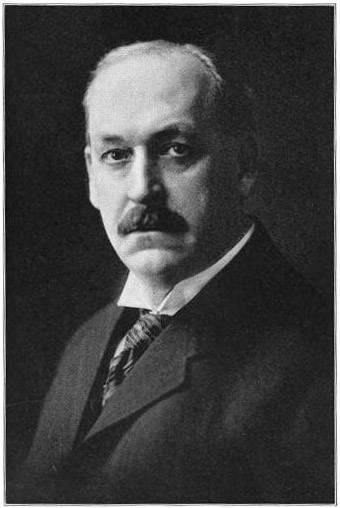
- Born: November 18, 1853; Whiskey Diggings, Sierra County, California
- Died: October 23, 1932 (aged 78); Detroit, Michigan
- Education: University of Michigan
- Spouse(s): Harriet Jane Nye, Lina O. (Shoemaker) Grant, Anna (Monroe) Knox
- Children: Mary Agnes, Charles, Clarence, Fred, Louis, Ralph, Harriet, and Elizabeth
- Parent(s): Dr. Charles Seymour and Annie Monroe Burton

Clarence Monroe Burton (November 18, 1853 – October 23, 1932) was a Detroit lawyer and businessman, historian, and philanthropist.

== Early years ==
In 1849, Dr. Charles Seymour and Annie Monroe Burton, along with their young son Charles Francis, moved from New York to the town of Battle Creek, Michigan. There, Dr. Burton founded the Battle Creek Journal and ran the newspaper until he was bitten by the gold bug in 1853. The family packed up and moved to the tiny California mining town of Whiskey Diggings in Sierra County, 85 miles from Marysville.

Clarence M. Burton was born in Whiskey Diggings on November 18, 1853, while his father was away attending another patient. Dr. Burton soon tired of the rugged mining life, and in 1854 the family left Whiskey Diggings and sailed for the east coast. However, their ship, the Yankee Blade, was hijacked and sunk off Point Arguello. Hundreds of passengers drowned, but all the Burtons survived; they returned to San Francisco, staying there until 1855, when they sailed back to New York to reunite with Annie's family.

The Burtons moved back to Michigan, this time settling on a small farm on the outskirts of Hastings. Dr. Burton started another newspaper, the Hastings Banner (which is still published today) in addition to reviving his medical practice. The Burtons had three more children: William, Ella, and Edward.

Clarence Burton grew up in Hastings, attending the local public schools there until 1869, when he followed his brother Charles to the University of Michigan in Ann Arbor. He began studying science, but in 1872 entered the Law Department at the university and received his degree in 1874.

On Christmas Day, 1872, while he was still attending law school, Burton married Harriet Jane Nye. The couple eventually had eight children, the first of whom, Mary Agnes, was born in Ann Arbor.

== Early career and married life ==
On November 19, 1874, the day after his twenty-first birthday, Burton was licensed to practice law in Wayne County, Michigan. He went to work for the firm of Ward and Palmer in Detroit for a yearly salary of $100 (soon boosted to $300).

Burton and his wife, Harriet, lived in relative poverty for the first few years of Burton's career, living first in a rented three-room house on Henry Street and then buying a house at Brooklyn and Trumbull on the edge of Corktown. They had two more children during this time: Charles in 1876 and Clarence in 1878. However, Burton worked hard, and in 1881 the family moved to a more well-to-do section of the city on Brady Street. Here, two more sons were born: Fred in 1882 and Louis in 1884.

During this time, Burton joined the title abstract firm co-owned by John Ward, a partner in Ward and Palmer. Ward and his nephew, Eugene Skinner, had started the business in 1866, and by the time Burton joined the business, the abstract records had been collected. Burton devoted himself to the business, and Ward and Skinner gave him much of the responsibility for running it. Skinner, however, had never really warmed to this business, and in 1881 he sold his share of the title company to Burton. Two years later, Burton was admitted as partner in Ward and Skinner, and he later bought all of John Ward's interest in the business.

In 1886, Burton moved again to Brainard Street, where his next son Frank was born. In 1890, a sixth son, Ralph, was added, and a few years later, a second daughter, Harriet.

== Burton Abstract Co. ==
In 1891, Burton organized the Burton Abstract Company from Ward and Skinner. The new company failed to show a profit for the first few years, but grew in size and importance as Detroit grew, and eventually turned a handsome profit. In 1893 the company moved its quarters to Griswold Street, then moved again in 1914 and 1919. In 1924, Burton Abstract moved one more time to a newly constructed building of their own.

In April 1915, Burton organized the Burton Investment Co, for the purpose of erecting 100 modestly priced homes in Detroit.

== Personal tragedy ==
On February 6, 1896, Burton's wife Harriet died, leaving Burton as the sole parent to eight children. He lost himself in his work, but eventually met Lina O. (Shoemaker) Grant. The two were married on Christmas Day, 1897. However, in 1898, Lina died as the result of an operation, leaving Burton alone once more. In the spring of 1900, Burton married his third wife, his cousin Anna (Monroe) Knox. She had four children from a previous marriage, and, in 1901, bore another daughter, Elizabeth.

== Book collection and historical work ==
Burton had always been interested in collecting books. He had begun in 1874 by collecting historical works pertaining to his interests, tracing down as many works as possible on that subject. He eventually began concentrating on American historical documents, and finally on Michigan and Detroit. In particular, he was interested in Antoine de la Mothe Cadillac. Burton spent years searching for and bidding on old books and manuscripts. Those that he could not buy he copied, either longhand or with a camera.

By the 1890s, Burton had amassed a considerable collection of historical documents. He had a special fireproof addition built onto his Brainard Street house to hold his library. Burton revered his collection, but he welcomed scholars, or even casual researchers, to use his library, even going so far as to advertise its availability in the City Directory.

In 1895, he turned his attention to writing histories, beginning with A Sketch of the Life of Antoine de la Mothe Cadillac, Founder of Detroit, which was published that year. A Chapter in the History Of Cleveland followed soon after, and one of his most famous works, In the Footsteps of Cadillac, was published a few years later in 1899.

Burton was elected a member of the American Antiquarian Society in 1907.

Burton continued to collect books and manuscripts throughout his life, slowing down in the mid-aughts when original material became scarce. Later, he concentrated more on writing, producing works that included The Building of Detroit in 1912, Barnabas Campau and his descendants in 1916, and the five-volume The City of Detroit in 1922.

== Public service ==
Throughout his life, Burton held positions of public trust, occasionally flirting with elected office. In 1896, he was appointed the Detroit School Inspector, a job he held for 17 years, resigning in 1913 when his other duties and interests became too great. In 1897, he prepared to run for city alderman, but withdrew from the race. In 1900, he wrote a letter for the Detroit Century Box time capsule. In 1903, he was announced as the Republican candidate for the Board of Regents of the University of Michigan, but lost the general election. In 1922 he ran for Congress, but was defeated by Vincent M. Brennan.

In 1907, he spent copious time involved with the 1907 State Constitutional Convention, and in 1913 sat on the Detroit Charter Commission. In 1908, Burton was elected City Historiographer for Detroit, a position he held until his death in 1932. In 1913, as a result of his keen interest in local history, Burton was elected to the Michigan Historical Commission, a membership he also held until his death.

== Burton Historical Collection ==
In 1915, Burton built a new house on Boston Boulevard in Boston-Edison which boasted fireproof steel and concrete construction. At the same time, Burton gave his book collection to the Detroit Public Library, along with the deed to his Brainard Street residence. In September 1915, the Burton Historical Collection, located on Brainard Street, was opened to the public. The collection donated by Burton included 30,000 volumes, 40,000 pamphlets and 500,000 unpublished papers; more material was added to the collection in subsequent years. The collection itself focuses on the history of Michigan, Detroit, and the Northwest Territory. In 1921, the collection was moved to the Main Library.

== Later years and death ==
In 1925 Burton's wife Anna died. Burton retired in 1930, leaving his business duties to his son Louis. After two years of retirement Burton began to ail. He became seriously ill for several months, and on Sunday, October 23, 1932, Clarence Monroe Burton suffered a cerebral hemorrhage and died.

== Books written by Clarence M. Burton ==
The following bibliography is not exhaustive.

- Burton, Clarence Monroe (1891). List of Streets in Detroit: The Names of which Have Been Changed, with the Dates of City Ordinances Changing the Same. The Wilton-Smith Company.
- Burton, Clarence Monroe (1895). A Sketch of the Life of Antoine de la Mothe Cadillac, Founder of Detroit. Wilton-Smith Company.
- Burton, Clarence Monroe (1895). A Chapter in the History of Cleveland. Wilton-Smith Company.
- Burton, Clarence Monroe (1896). "Cadillac's village", or, "Detroit under Cadillac" : with list of property owners and a history of the settlement, 1701 to 1710. Detroit : [s.n.]
- Ross, Robert Budd; Catlin, George Byron; Burton, Clarence Monroe (1898). Landmarks of Detroit;. Evening News Association.
- Burton, Clarence Monroe (1899). In the Footsteps of Cadillac. Detroit: Wolverine printing co.
- Burton, Clarence Monroe (1904). Historical memoranda of the territory of Michigan. Detroit.
- Utley, Henry M.; Cutcheon, Byron M. (1906). Burton, Clarence M. (ed.). Michigan as a province, territory and state, the twenty-sixth member of the federal Union. New York: The Publishing society of Michigan.
- Burton, Clarence Monroe; Sparks, Edwin Erle (1908). Historical papers delivered before the Society of Colonial Wars of the State of Michigan. Detroit: Winn & Hammond.
- Burton, Clarence Monroe (1909). Compendium of history and biography of the city of Detroit and Wayne County, Michigan (1st ed.). Chicago: H. Taylor & co.
- Burton, Clarence Monroe (1909). Compendium of History and Biography of the City of Detroit and Wayne County, Michigan: Illustrated (Classic Reprint) (Reprint ed.). Forgotten Books (published 2018). ISBN 978-0266820079.
- Burton, Clarence Monroe (1909). Early Detroit: A Sketch of Some of the Interesting Affairs of the Olden Time. Detroit, MI: Speaker-Hines Press.
- Burton, Clarence Monroe (1909). John Connolly, a Tory of the revolution. Worcester, MA: The Davis Press.
- Dodge, John; Burton, Clarence Monroe (1909). "Introductory Note". Narrative of Mr. John Dodge during his captivity at Detroit, reproduced in facsimile from the 2d. ed. of 1780. The Torch Press.
- Burton, Clarence Monroe (1909). Amusements in Detroit in colonial days. Speaker-Hines Press.
- Burton, Clarence Monroe; Douglass, Ephraim; McCully, George (1910). Ephraim Douglass and His Times: A Fragment of History : with the Journal of George McCully (Hitherto Unpublished) : And Various Letters of the Period. New York: William Abbatt.
- Burton, Clarence Monroe (1912). The building of Detroit.
- Burton, Clarence Monroe (1914). Detroit in earlier days. Detroit, MI: The Burton abstract & title company.
- Burton, Mary Agnes; Burton, Clarence Monroe, eds. (1915). "Proceedings of the Land Board of Detroit". Governor and Judges Journal.
- Burton, Clarence Monroe (1916–1918). Burton, M. Agnes (ed.). Manuscripts from the Burton historical collection. Detroit, Burton.
- Burton, Clarence Monroe (1916). Barnabas Campau and his descendants.
- Burton, Clarence Monroe (1917). History of Detroit, 1780 to 1850, financial and commercial.
- Burton, Clarence Monroe (1922). Introduction. Corporation of the Town of Detroit: Act of Incorporation and Journal of the Board of Trustees 1802–1805. By Board of Trustees (Detroit MI). Detroit, MI: Detroit Public Library.
- Burton, Clarence Monroe (1922). Stocking, William; Miller, Gordon K. (eds.). The city of Detroit, Michigan, 1701-1922. Vol. 1. Detroit-Chicago: The S. J. Clarke publishing company.
- Burton, Clarence Monroe (1922). Stocking, William; Miller, Gordon K. (eds.). The city of Detroit, Michigan, 1701-1922. Vol. 2. Detroit-Chicago: The S. J. Clarke publishing company.
- Burton, Clarence Monroe (1922). Stocking, William; Miller, Gordon K. (eds.). The city of Detroit, Michigan, 1701-1922. Vol. 3. Detroit-Chicago: The S. J. Clarke publishing company.
- Burton, Clarence Monroe (1922). Stocking, William; Miller, Gordon K. (eds.). The city of Detroit, Michigan, 1701-1922. Vol. 4. Detroit-Chicago: The S. J. Clarke publishing company.
- Burton, Clarence Monroe (1922). Stocking, William; Miller, Gordon K. (eds.). The city of Detroit, Michigan, 1701-1922. Vol. 5. Detroit-Chicago: The S. J. Clarke publishing company.
- Burton, Clarence Monroe (1929). The Hyde house and the Garrick theatre on Griswold street, Detroit.
- Burton, Clarence Monroe; Burton, M. Agnes (1930), Blue, H.T.O.; Miller, Gordon K. (eds.), History of Wayne County and the city of Detroit, Michigan, vol. 1, Detroit-Chicago: The S. J. Clarke Publishing Company
- Burton, Clarence Monroe; Burton, M. Agnes (1930), Blue, H.T.O.; Miller, Gordon K. (eds.), History of Wayne County and the city of Detroit, Michigan, vol. 2, Detroit-Chicago: The S. J. Clarke Publishing Company
- Burton, Clarence Monroe; Burton, M. Agnes (1930), Blue, H.T.O; Miller, Gordon K. (eds.), History of Wayne County and the city of Detroit, Michigan, vol. 3, Detroit-Chicago: The S. J. Clarke Publishing Company
- Burton, Clarence Monroe; Burton, M. Agnes (1930), Blue, H.T.O.; Miller, Gordon K. (eds.), History of Wayne County and the city of Detroit, Michigan, vol. 4, Detroit-Chicago: The S. J. Clarke Publishing Company
- Burton, Clarence Monroe; Burton, M. Agnes (1930), Blue, H.T.O.; Miller, Gordon K. (eds.), History of Wayne County and the city of Detroit, Michigan, vol. 5, Detroit-Chicago: The S. J. Clarke Publishing Company
