= List of golf courses designed by Donald Ross =

Correction

This is a list of golf courses designed by Donald Ross (November 23, 1872 – April 26, 1948). He designed courses in Canada and the United States.

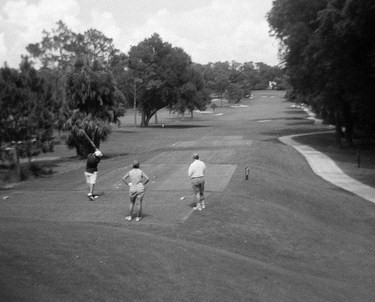
Mark Bostic Golf Course

This is not a comprehensive list. It is sorted by country, state/province, city, and then course.

== Canada ==
=== Manitoba ===
- Elmhurst Golf and Country Club, Winnipeg
- Pine Ridge Golf Club, Winnipeg
- St. Charles Country Club, Winnipeg

=== New Brunswick ===
- The Algonquin Resort, St. Andrews
- Riverside Country Club, Rothesay
- Westfield Golf and Country Club, Grand Bay-Westfield

=== Nova Scotia ===
- Brightwood Golf and Country Club, Dartmouth
- White Point Golf Course, Queens County

=== Ontario ===
- Essex Golf and Country Club, Windsor
- Rosedale Golf Club, Toronto
- Roseland Golf and Curling Club, Windsor

== United States ==
=== Alabama ===
- Birmingham Country Club East and West Courses, Birmingham
- Country Club of Mobile, Mobile
- Mountain Brook Club, Birmingham

=== California ===
- The Peninsula Golf & Country Club, San Mateo

=== Colorado ===
- Broadmoor Golf Club, East Course (holes 1-6,16-18), West Course (holes 1-4, 13-18) Colorado Springs
- Lakewood County Club, Lakewood
- Trinidad Municipal Golf Course, Trinidad
- Wellshire Golf Course, Denver

=== Connecticut ===
- Birchwood Country Club, Westport
- Country Club of Waterbury, Waterbury
- Shennecossett Golf Course, Groton
- Wampanoag Country Club, West Hartford

=== Florida ===
- Bartow Golf Course, Bartow
- Belleair Country Club, Belleair
- Biltmore Golf Club, Coral Gables
- Bobby Jones Golf Course, Sarasota
- Bradenton Country Club, Bradenton
- Clewiston Country Club, Clewiston
- The Country Club of Orlando, Orlando
- Daytona Beach Golf Course (South Course), Daytona Beach
- Delray Beach Golf Course, Delray Beach
- Dunedin Country Club, Dunedin
- Fort George Island Golf Club (now gone), Jacksonville
- Fort Myers Country Club, Fort Myers
- Gulf Stream Golf Club, Delray Beach
- Hollywood Beach Golf Course, Hollywood
- Keystone Heights Golf & Country Club, Keystone Heights
- Lake Wales Country Club, Lake Wales
- Mark Bostick Golf Course, Gainesville
- Mayfair Country Club (formerly Sanford Country Club), Sanford
- Melbourne Golf Club, Melbourne
- New Smyrna Beach Golf Course, New Smyrna Beach
- Palatka Municipal Golf Course, Palatka
- Palm Beach Country Club, Palm Beach
- Palma Ceia Golf Club, Tampa
- Palma Sola Golf Club, Bradenton
- Panama Country Club, Lynn Haven
- Pelican Golf Club (formerly Belleview Biltmore Golf Club), Belleair
- Pinecrest Golf Club, Avon Park
- Ponce de Leon Resort & Country Club (now gone), St. Augustine
- Punta Gorda Country Club, Punta Gorda
- Riviera Country Club, Coral Gables
- Sara Bay Country Club, Sarasota
- San Jose Country Club, Jacksonville
- Seminole Golf Club, Juno Beach
- St. Augustine Links - South, St. Augustine
- Timuquana Country Club, Jacksonville

=== Georgia ===
- Athens Country Club, Athens
- Augusta Country Club, Augusta
- Bacon Park Municipal Golf Course (original 18), Savannah
- Brunswick Country Club, Brunswick
- Country Club of Columbus, Columbus
- East Lake Golf Club, Atlanta
- Forest Hills Golf Club, Augusta
- Highland Country Club, LaGrange (front 9)
- Idle Hour Club, Macon
- Savannah Country Club, Savannah
- Washington Wilkes Country Club, Washington

=== Illinois ===
- Beverly Country Club, Evergreen Park
- Bob O'Link Golf Club, Highland Park
- Calumet Country Club, Homewood
- Evanston Golf Club, Skokie
- Exmoor Country Club, Highland Park
- Flossmoor Country Club, Flossmoor
- Indian Hill Club, Winnetka
- LaGrange Country Club, LaGrange
- Northmoor Country Club, Highland Park
- Oak Park Country Club, River Grove
- Old Elm Club, Highland Park
- Ravisloe Country Club, Homewood
- Skokie Country Club, Glencoe

=== Indiana ===
- Broadmoor Country Club, Indianapolis
- Donald Ross Course, French Lick Resort Casino, French Lick
- Donald Ross Golf Course front nine, Fort Wayne

=== Iowa ===
- Cedar Rapids Country Club, Cedar Rapids

=== Kansas ===
- Shawnee Country Club, Topeka

=== Kentucky ===
- Idle Hour Country Club, Lexington

=== Maine ===
- Lucerne Golf Course, Dedham
- Portland Country Club, Falmouth
- Lake Kezar Country Club Lovell
- Augusta Country Club, Manchester
- Cape Neddick Country Club, Cape Neddick (York)
- Penobscot Valley Country Club, Orono
- Poland Spring Resort Golf Course (redesigned and expanded), Poland Spring
- York country club, york
- Biddeford Saco Country Club, Saco
- Blue Hill Country Club, Blue Hill

=== Maryland ===
- Country Club at Woodmore, Mitchelville
- Fountain Head Country Club, Hagerstown

=== Massachusetts ===
- Andover Country Club, Andover
- Bass River Golf Course, Yarmouth
- Belmont Country Club, Belmont
- Brae Burn Country Club, Newton
- Charles River Country Club, Newton
- Cohasse Country Club, Southbridge
- Cohasset Golf Club, Cohasset
- Concord Country Club, Concord
- Country Club of Pittsfield, Pittsfield
- Ellinwood Country Club, Athol
- Essex County Club, Manchester-by-the-Sea (1893)
- Framingham Country Club, Framingham
- George Wright Golf Course, Hyde Park
- Greenock Country Club, Lee
- Fresh Pond Golf Course, Cambridge
- Hyannisport Club, Hyannis Port
- Kernwood Country Club, Salem
- Leo J. Martin Memorial Golf Course, Weston
- Littlputt Links, Brookline (indoor miniature golf)
- Longmeadow Country Club, Longmeadow
- Ludlow Country Club, Ludlow
- Merrimack Valley Golf Club, Methuen
- Newton Commonwealth, Newton
- North Andover Country Club, North Andover
- Oak Hill Country Club, Fitchburg
- Oakley Country Club, Watertown (redesigned existing 18 hole course, completed fall 1900)
- Orchards Golf Club, South Hadley
- Oyster Harbors Osterville
- Petersham Country Club, Petersham
- Plymouth Country Club Plymouth
- Pocasset Golf Club, Pocasset
- Ponkapoag Golf Course No. 1, Canton
- Ponkapoag Golf Course No. 2 (front 9 only), Canton
- Salem Country Club, Peabody
- Sandy Burr Country Club, Wayland
- Southwick Country Club Southwick
- Springfield Country Club, Springfield
- Tatnuck Country Club, Worcester
- Tekoa Country Club Westfield
- Vesper Country Club, Tyngsborough
- Wachusett Country Club, West Boylston
- Weston Golf Club, Weston
- Whaling City Golf Club (front 9), New Bedford
- Whitinsville Golf Club, Whitinsville
- Wianno Golf Club Osterville
- William J. Devine Memorial Golf Course, Boston (re-design)
- Winchendon Golf Club, Winchendon
- Winchester Country Club, Winchester
- Woodland Golf Club, Auburndale
- Worcester Country Club, Worcester
- Wyckoff Country Club, Holyoke (partial, 5 fairways, 7 greens after re-design)

=== Michigan ===
- Barton Hills Country Club, Ann Arbor
- Chandler Park, Detroit
- Dearborn Country Club, Dearborn
- Detroit Golf Club, Detroit
- Elk Rapids Golf Club, Elk Rapids
- Franklin Hills Country Club, Franklin
- Grosse Ile Golf and Country Club, Grosse Ile
- Highlands Golf Course, Grand Rapids (closed)
- Kent Country Club, Grand Rapids
- Monroe Golf and Country Club, Monroe
- Muskegon Country Club, Muskegon
- Oakland Hills Country Club, Bloomfield Hills
- Rackham Golf Course, Huntington Woods
- Rogell Golf Course, Detroit
- Shadow Ridge Golf Course, Ionia
- St. Clair Golf Club, St. Clair
- Warren Valley Golf Club, Dearborn Heights
- West Shore Golf Club, Grosse Ile
- Western Golf & Country Club, Redford

=== Minnesota ===
- Interlachen Country Club, Edina
- The Minikahda Club, Minneapolis
- Minneapolis Golf Club, St Louis Park
- Northland Country Club, Duluth
- Woodhill Country Club, Wayzata
- White Bear Lake Yacht Club, White Bear

=== Missouri ===
- Hillcrest Country Club, Kansas City

=== New Hampshire ===
- The Balsams Grand Resort Hotel (The Panorama Golf Course), Dixville Notch
- Bald Peak Colony Club, Melvin Village
- Bethlehem Country Club, Bethlehem
- Carter Country Club, Lebanon
- Crotched Mountain Golf Club (first 9 holes), Francestown
- Kingswood Golf Club, Wolfeboro
- Lake Sunapee Country Club, New London
- Manchester Country Club, Bedford
- Maplewood Golf Club, Bethlehem
- Mount Washington Hotel (Mount Washington Course), Bretton Woods
- Wentworth by the Sea Country Club, Rye

=== New Jersey ===
- Crestmont Country Club, West Orange
- Deal Golf Club, Deal
- Echo Lake Country Club, Westfield
- Knickerbocker Country Club (1914), Tenafly
- Montclair Golf Club (1920), West Orange
- Mountain Ridge Country Club, West Caldwell
- Plainfield Country Club, Edison
- River Vale Country Club (1931), River Vale
- Riverton Country Club (1900), Cinnaminson
- Seaview Marriott Resort (Bay Course), Absecon

=== New York ===
- Bellevue Country Club, Syracuse
- Brook Lea Country Club, Rochester
- Chautauqua Golf Club-Lake Course, Chautauqua
- Country Club of Buffalo, Williamsville
- Country Club of Rochester, Brighton
- Glens Falls Country Club, Glens Falls
- Irondequoit Country Club, Pittsford (near Rochester)
- Lake Pleasant Golf Club, Lake Pleasant
- Mark Twain Golf Course, Elmira
- Monroe Golf Club, Pittsford
- North Fork Country Club, Cutchogue
- Oak Hill Country Club (East & West), Pittsford
- Rip Van Winkle Country Club, Palenville
- The Sagamore Golf Course, Bolton Landing
- Schroon Lake Municipal Golf Club, Schroon Lake
- Siwanoy Country Club, Bronxville
- Teugega Country Club, Rome
- Thendara Golf Club Front Nine, Thendara
- Tupper Lake Country Club, Tupper Lake
- Whippoorwill Club, Armonk

=== North Carolina ===
- Alamance Country Club, Burlington
- Asheboro Municipal Golf Course, Asheboro
- Asheville Municipal Golf Club, Asheville
- Benvenue Country Club, Rocky Mount
- Biltmore Forest Country Club, Biltmore Forest, 1922
- Black Mountain Municipal Golf Course, Black Mountain
- Blowing Rock Country Club, Blowing Rock
- Cape Fear Country Club, Wilmington
- Carolina Golf Club, Charlotte, 1929
- Catawba Country Club, Newton
- Charlotte Country Club, Charlotte, 1910
- Country Club of Asheville, Asheville
- Country Club of Salisbury, Salisbury
- Forsyth Country Club, Winston-Salem
- Greensboro Country Club, Greensboro
- Grove Park Inn Golf Club, Asheville
- Hendersonville Country Club, Hendersonville
- High Point Country Club, High Point
- Highland Country Club, Fayetteville
- Highlands Country Club, Highlands
- Hillandale Golf Course (front 9 holes), Durham
- Hope Valley Country Club, Durham
- Lake Hickory Country Club, Hickory
- Lake Lure Municipal Golf Course (9 holes), Lake Lure
- Lenoir Golf Club, Lenoir
- Linville Golf Club, Linville
- Mid Pines Golf Club, Southern Pines
- Mimosa Hills Country Club, Morganton
- Monroe Country Club (front 9 holes), Monroe
- Mooresville Golf Course (front 9 holes), Mooresville
- Myers Park Country Club, Charlotte
- New Bern Golf and Country Club, New Bern
- Overhills Golf Club, Percy Rockefeller Estate (now on Fort Bragg - Stryker Golf Course)
- Pennrose Park Country Club, Reidsville
- Pine Needles Golf Club, Southern Pines
- Pinecrest Country Club, Lumberton
- Pinehurst No. 1, Pinehurst
- Pinehurst No. 2, Pinehurst
- Pinehurst No. 3, Pinehurst
- Raleigh Country Club, Raleigh
- Richmond Pines Country Club, Rockingham
- Roaring Gap Country Club, Roaring Gap
- Sanford Golf Club, Sanford
- Sedgefield Country Club, Greensboro
- Southern Pines Golf Club, Southern Pines
- Stryker Golf Course, Fort Bragg
- Tryon Country Club, Tryon
- Waynesville Country Club Inn, Waynesville
- Wilmington Municipal Golf Course, Wilmington

=== Ohio ===
- Acacia Country Club, Lyndhurst (course was closed in 2013 & converted to public greenspace)
- Athens Country Club, Athens
- Avon Fields Golf Course, Cincinnati
- Brookside Country Club, Canton
- Chillicothe Country Club, Chillicothe
- Columbus Country Club, Columbus
- Congress Lake Club, Hartville
- Dayton Country Club, Dayton
- Delaware Golf Club (original/back 9, formerly Dornoch), Delaware
- Denison Golf Club at Granville (formerly Granville Golf Course), Granville
- Hyde Park Country Club, Cincinnati
- Inverness Club, Toledo
- Kenwood Country Club (Kendale & Kenview), Cincinnati
- Lancaster Country Club, Lancaster
- Maketewah Country Club, Cincinnati
- Manakiki Golf Course (Cleveland Metroparks), Willoughby Hills
- Miami Shores Golf Course, Troy
- Miami Valley Golf Club, Dayton
- Mill Creek Park Golf Course, Youngstown
- Mohawk Golf Club (original/back 9), Tiffin
- Oakwood Club, Cleveland Heights (course closed and turned into a shopping center)
- Piqua Country Club, Piqua
- Portsmouth Elks Country Club, McDermott
- Scioto Country Club, Columbus
- Shaker Heights Country Club, Shaker Heights
- Springfield Country Club, Springfield
- Westbrook Country Club, Mansfield
- Youngstown Country Club, Youngstown
- Zanesville Country Club, Zanesville

=== Pennsylvania ===
- Allegheny Country Club, Sewickley Heights
- Aronimink Golf Club, Newtown Square
- Bedford Springs Hotel, Bedford
- The Berkshire Country Club, Reading
- Buck Hill Falls Golf Club, Buck Hill Falls
- Conewango Valley Country Club, Warren
- Country Club of York, York
- Edgewood Country Club, Churchill
- Elkview Country Club, Greenfield Township
- Flourtown Country Club, Flourtown
- Green Oaks Country Club, Verona
- Gulph Mills Golf Club
- Immergrun Golf Club, Loretto, on the campus of Saint Francis University
- Jeffersonville Golf Club, Norristown
- Kahkwa Club, Fairview (Erie)
- Kennett Square Golf and Country Club, Kennett Square
- Lewistown Country Club (original 9 holes), Lewistown
- LuLu Country Club, Glenside
- McCall Field Golf and Country Club
- Pocono Manor Golf Course (East Course), Pocono Manor
- Rolling Rock Club, Laughlintown
- Schuylkill Country Club, Orwigsburg
- St. Davids Golf Club, Wayne
- Steel Club, Hellertown
- Tumblebrook, Coopersburg
- The Union League Golf Club at Torresdale, Philadelphia
- Wanango Country Club (first 9), Reno (later redesigned by A.W. Tillinghast)

=== Rhode Island ===
- Agawam Hunt, Rumford
- Goddard Memorial State Park, Warwick
- Metacomet Country Club, East Providence
- The Misquamicut Club, Watch Hill
- Point Judith Country Club, Narragansett
- Rhode Island Country Club, Barrington
- Sakonnet Golf Club, Little Compton
- Triggs Memorial Golf Course, Providence
- Wannamoisett Country Club, Rumford
- Warwick Country Club, Warwick
- Winnapaug Golf Course, Westerly

=== South Carolina ===
- Camden Country Club, Camden
- Country Club of Spartanburg Spartanburg (front nine)
- Dogwood hills. Walterboro (9 holes)
- Fort Mill Golf Club (9 holes), Fort Mill
- Lancaster Golf Club (9 holes), Lancaster
- Moree's Country Club (19 holes), Cheraw

=== Tennessee ===
- Belle Meade Country Club, Nashville
- Brainerd Golf Club, Chattanooga
- Chattanooga Golf and Country Club, Chattanooga
- Cherokee Country Club, Knoxville
- Holston Hills Country Club, Knoxville
- Memphis Country Club, Memphis
- Original Richland Country Club, Nashville
- Ridgefields Country Club, Kingsport
- Shelby Golf Club, Nashville
- Tate Springs Country Club, Bean Station (closed due to TVA flooding in 1942)

=== Texas ===
- Galveston Country Club, Galveston
- River Oaks Country Club, Houston
- Sunset Grove Country Club, Orange

=== Vermont ===
- Burlington Country Club, Burlington

=== Virginia ===
- Army Navy Country Club, Arlington
- Bedford Country Club, Bedford
- Country Club of Virginia (Westhampton Course), Richmond
- Danville Golf Club, Danville
- The Homestead (the old course), Hot Springs
- Kinderton Country Club, Clarksville
- Lakeside Park Club, Henrico County
- Sewells Point, Norfolk
- Washington Golf & Country Club, Arlington
- Woodberry Forest School (9-hole course)
- The Woodlands Golf Course, Hampton

=== Wisconsin ===
- Kenosha Country Club, Kenosha
- Oconomowoc Golf Club, Oconomowoc
