= Horace H. Rackham Memorial Fountain =

Fountain in the Detroit Zoo, Royal Oak, Michigan

Coordinates: 42°28′37″N 83°09′22″W

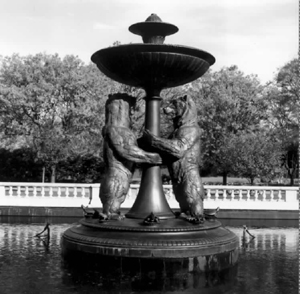
Horace H. Rackham Memorial Fountain

The Horace Rackham Memorial Fountain (1939), also known as the Bear Fountain, is a fountain located in the Detroit Zoo, Royal Oak, Michigan. It was designed by Frederick A. Schnaple (1872–1948) and sculpted by Corrado Parducci.

== Description ==
The fountain consists of a large bowl supported by two standing bears—as well as several frogs, turtles and even a couple of seals—along with some granite putti on the outside of the fountain.

== Donor ==
Mary Rackham, widow of the Detroit industrialist Horace Rackham, made several significant donations in his name, including the Horace H. Rackham School of Graduate Studies at the University of Michigan, the Rackham School at Eastern Michigan University and the Horace H. Rackham Building in the Cultural Center in Detroit. Horace Rackham had served as the first president of Detroit's Zoological Commission, and to commemorate his connection with the zoo Mary Rackham donated the funds to create the fountain.

== Surviving maquette ==
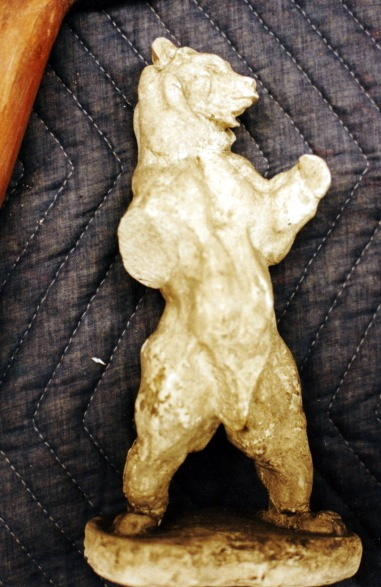
Maquette of bear from the Horace Rackham Memorial Fountain by Corrado Parducci

Parducci's maquette for one of the bears has survived in the Detroit Historical Museum collection.

== Comments by the artist ==
About this commission Parducci said, "I didn't like that. I made it against my will. They wanted, Mrs. Rackham was sold on that, bears . . ."
