= Rackham Golf Course =

Golf course in Huntington Woods, Michigan

Coordinates: 42°28′33″N 83°09′52″W

- Interactive map of Rackham Golf Course

Club information
- Location: Huntington Woods, Oakland County, Michigan
- Established: 1924
- Type: Public
- Owner: The City of Detroit
- Operator: Golf Detroit
- Tota holes: 18
- Website: http://rackham.golf/

Course
- Designed by: Donald Ross
- Par: 71
- Length: 6,555 yards
- Course rating: 70.8

The Rackham Golf Course is a public golf course designed by Donald Ross, located in Huntington Woods, Michigan and adjacent to the Detroit Zoo. The grounds crew at Rackham maintains one 18-hole course.

== History ==
In 1924, Horace Rackham purchased acres of land in Huntington Woods, Michigan, near land owned by the Detroit Zoological Society. (Currently this land would be extending from the corner of I-696 and Woodward to I-696 and Scotia Road). Rackham promised to donate the land towards a zoo as long as Detroit voters approved of it. The voters did pass the proposal, and Rackham followed through on his promise and gave 22 acres (8.9 ha) for a parking lot, and the rest for a public golf course to be built. In 1925, the course was complete. Designed by Donald Ross, who also designed the Detroit Golf Club and numerous other courses, created an 18-hole course open to the public. Rackham has also been named one of Ross' ten best public golf courses. It has been the home of Ben Davis, one of the country's first African-American golf pros. Joe Louis, the famous boxer known as the "Brown Bomber", played the course on a regular basis back in his day. The historic original front 9 was closed in October 1983 for major revisions due to the encroachment of I-696 extending through the area. Major changes to the front 9-hole layout were completed about 2 1/2 years later. The 7th & 9th holes are the only two untouched front 9 holes remaining from the original Ross layout.

== Course ==
The course is 18 holes with a Par of 71. A total of 6,555 yards with a course rating is 70.8. There are no water hazards on the entire course.
