= Horace Rackham =

American lawyer

Horace H. Rackham
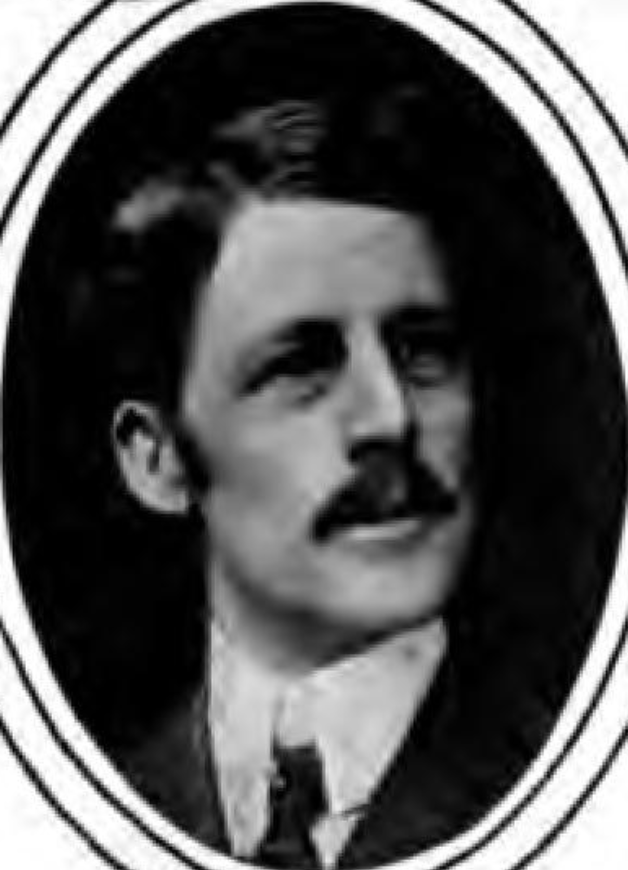
- Horace H. Rackham, c. 1902
- Born: June 20, 1858; Harrison Township, Michigan, U.S.
- Died: June 12, 1933 (aged 74); Detroit, Michigan, U.S.
- Occupation: Lawyer
- Spouse: Mary A. Horton
- Parent(s): Simon Rackham and Avery Rackman

Horace Hatcher Rackham (June 27, 1858 – June 12, 1933) was one of the original stockholders in the Ford Motor Company and a noted philanthropist.

== Early life ==
Rackham was born in Harrison Township, Michigan. He graduated from high school in Leslie, Michigan, in 1878. In 1879, he moved to Detroit, Michigan, to work for Berry Brothers. In 1884, he began studying law under the employ of Adolph Sloman and was admitted to the Bar in 1885. The next year, he married Mary A. Horton (1864-1947) of Fenton, Michigan.

In 1894, he partnered with John W. Anderson to open a law firm. The partnership was very successful, counting among their clients Alexander Y. Malcomson, a Detroit coal dealer.

== Shareholder of Ford ==
In 1903, at Malcomson's advice, Henry Ford hired Rackham and Anderson to draw up papers incorporating the Ford Motor Company. Ford (and Malcomson) also convinced the partners to buy stock in the company. Rackham scraped together $5,000 by borrowing some money and selling some real estate parcels. With great uncertainty and against the advice of others, (the president of the Michigan Savings Bank infamously told Rackham, "The horse is here to stay, but the automobile is only a novelty – a fad,") Rackham bought 50 shares of Ford stock (from a total of 890 shares); Anderson bought another 50. In addition to Ford, Anderson, and Rackham, seven other people were awarded stock in the company, including Malcomson, James J. Couzens (future mayor of Detroit and Michigan Senator) and John Francis Dodge and Horace Elgin Dodge (who later founded the Dodge Brothers Motor Vehicle Company). At the first meeting of stockholders, Rackham was elected chairman.

Ford Motor Company was wildly successful, providing substantial dividends, and in 1913, Rackham quit his law practice. In 1919, Edsel Ford, acting for his father, Henry, purchased Rackham's stock for 12.5 million dollars. Rackham's acquired wealth had little effect on his and Mary's lifestyle. Because Rackham was always cautious with his finances and leery of speculative nature of the stock market, the Great Depression had little effect on his fortune. Rackham spent the rest of his life as a philanthropist, giving money to children's charities, the University of Michigan, and other causes. At the time of his death, Rackham's estate was valued at an estimated $16.5 million, for which he designated his wife as trustee.

== Philanthropy ==
Horace Rackham and his wife Mary supported the University of Michigan by donating his law library, sponsoring anthropological expeditions, and underwriting creative arts fellowships. Most significantly, when he died in 1933, Rackham left $100,000 in his will expressly to support graduate student loans. The Horace H. Rackham School of Graduate Studies at the university is named after him, as is the Rackham Building, built in 1938, in which the school is housed. In addition, the Horace H. Rackham Education Memorial Building in Detroit, intended for use by the Extension Service of the University of Michigan and the Engineering Society of Detroit, was built in 1940 using money willed to the University. The Rackhams were also the patrons of the 1938 Rackham School of Special Education on Eastern Michigan University campus in Ypsilanti, Michigan.

Mary was also a benefactor of Principia College in Elsah, Illinois. Beginning in 1933, and without having visited the campus, she began to make regular contributions to the College. She continued her support until just before her passing. Her philanthropy began with gifts to the College's general fund, leading to the complete funding of a men's residence dormitory, Building 28, which was then dedicated to her and named the Mary Horton Rackham Court on June 5, 1938. Years of donations to support its upkeep followed. The building was part of the original set of Principia College campus buildings designed by architect Bernard R. Maybeck. In a note accompanying the significant donation funding the dormitory, Rackham wrote, "There is nothing I would rather give to than Christian Science,"

After the death of Mary Rackham in 1947, the Horace H. and Mary A. Rackham Fund was created. The fund was to be used expressly "for such benevolent, charitable, educational, scientific, religious and public purposes ... will promote the health, welfare, happiness, education, training and development of men, women and children, particularly the sick, aged, young, erring, poor, crippled, helpless, handicapped, unfortunate and underprivileged, regardless of race, color, religion or station."

== Gallery of Rackham's philanthropic gifts ==
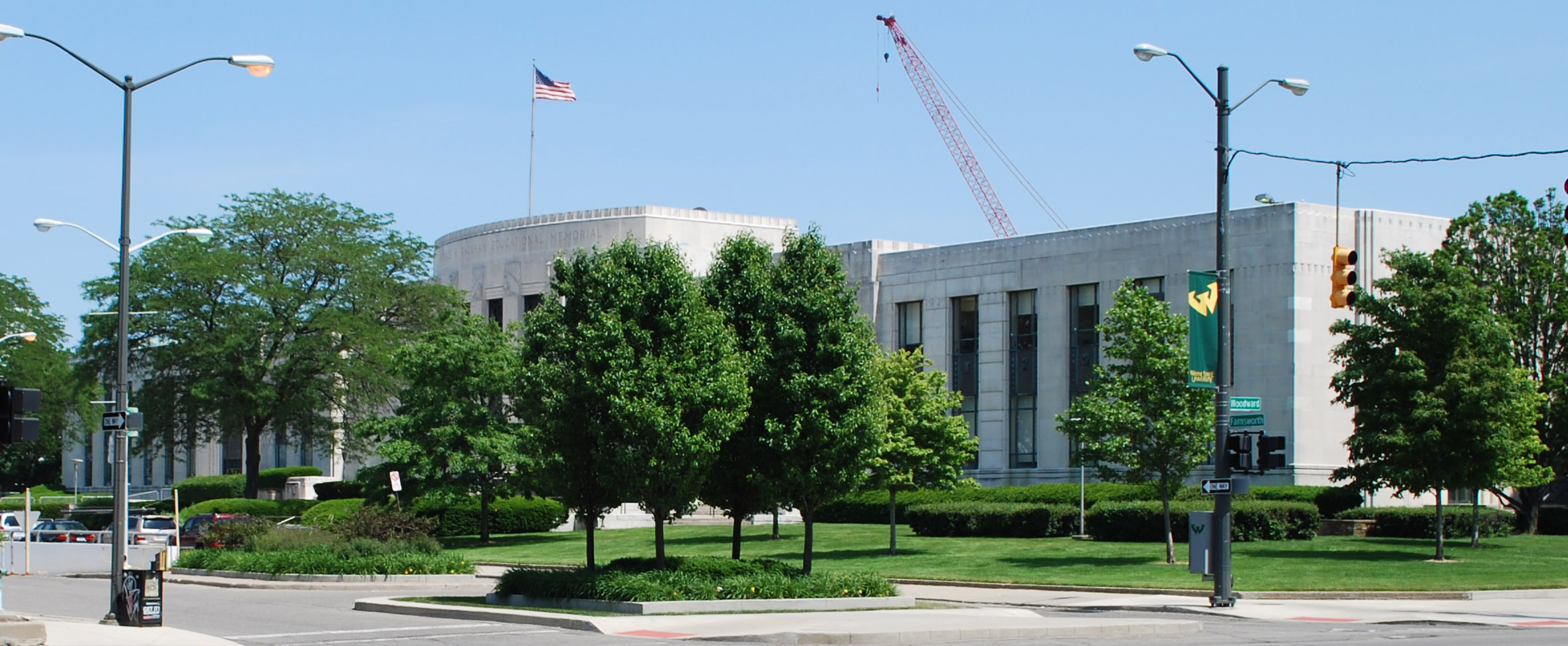
Horace H. Rackham Education Memorial Building in Detroit's Cultural Center Historic District

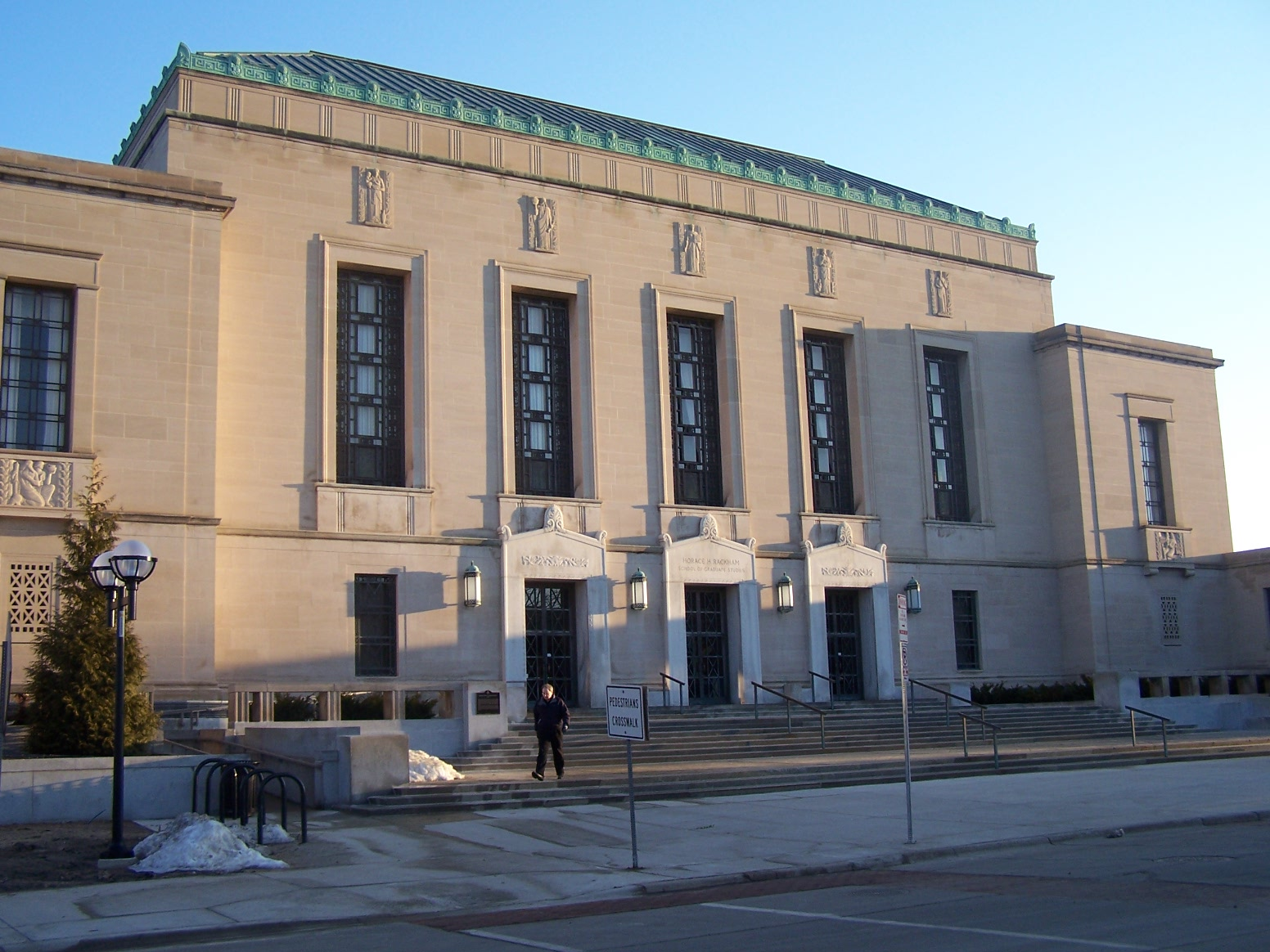
Horace H. Rackham School of Graduate Studies at the University of Michigan

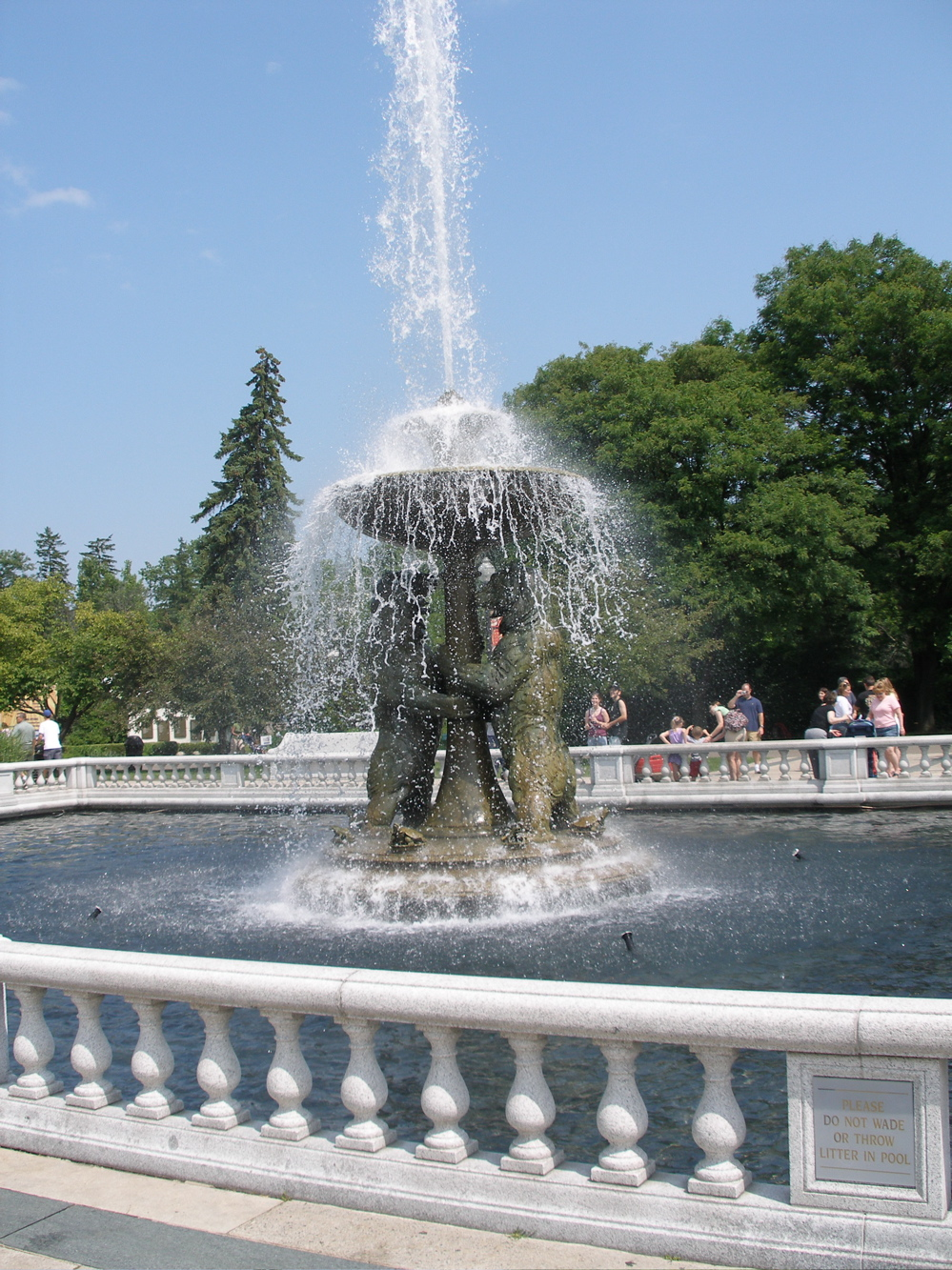
Horace H. Rackham Memorial Fountain at the Detroit Zoo by Corrado Parducci

== Detroit Zoo ==
From 1924 to 1928, Rackham was the first president of the Detroit Zoological Commission, which negotiated with the city for support for the zoo. In 1924, Rackham purchased acres of land in what is now Huntington Woods, Michigan, near land owned by the Detroit Zoological Society. Through his friend and Detroit mayor James Couzens, Rackham anonymously promised to donate the land to Detroit if voters would approve financing for the Detroit Zoo. A millage was approved, and Rackham followed through by giving 22 acres (8.9 ha) of his purchase to the Zoo for use as a parking lot; the Horace H. Rackham Memorial Fountain at the zoo bears his name. The remaining acreage was given to the city of Detroit, explicitly for use as a public golf course. In 1925 the Rackham Golf Course, reportedly the first 18-hole course constructed in Michigan, opened to the public

== Legacy ==
A species of Central American lizard, Xenosaurus rackhami, is named in his honor.
