= Jan van der Marck =

Dutch–American art curator and historian (1929–2010)

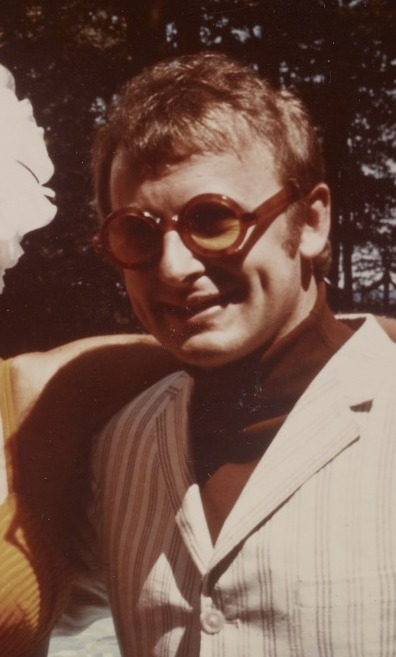
- van der Marck in August 1968
- Born: August 19, 1929; Roermond, Limburg, Netherlands
- Died: April 26, 2010 (aged 80); Huntington Woods, Michigan, US
- Education: Radboud University Nijmegen
- Spouses: Ingeborg Lachmann (m. 1961; died 1988); Sheila Stamell

Jan van der Marck (19 August 1929 – 26 April 2010) was a Dutch-born American museum administrator, art historian, and curator, focused on modern and contemporary art. Van der Marck authored and published many essays, articles and books about artists and art.

He worked in various museum roles at the Walker Art Center (1962–1967), Museum of Contemporary Art, Chicago (1967–?), the University of Washington, the Hopkins Center Art Galleries at Dartmouth College (1974–1980), the Center for the Fine Arts in Miami (1980–1986), and the Detroit Institute of Arts (1986–1995).

== Early life and education ==
He was born in Roermond, Netherlands, on August 19, 1929, to a family in the printing and publishing businesses. He attended Radboud University Nijmegen and received his Doctor of Philosophy in 1956, and his thesis was on 19th-century Belgian book illustration.

== Career ==
Van der Marck arrived in the United States in 1957, after receiving a grant from the Rockefeller Foundation to study museums and was able to learn from Meyer Schapiro at Columbia University. His first museum job was in 1963 at the Walker Art Center, where he hosted exhibitions of Arman and Lucio Fontana.

He was the founding director of Museum of Contemporary Art, Chicago in 1967, where he hosted Dan Flavin's first major museum exhibition. In 1969, van der Marck hosted the exhibition Art by Telephone, where artists would call in the instructions on how to build and display their artwork. While he was in Chicago, van der Marck invited two unknown artists at the time, Christo and Jeanne-Claude to wrap the museum building in canvas. After the wrapping of the building in canvas, he resigned from his position.

In 1974, he joined the Hood Museum of Art (previously called Hopkins Center Art Galleries) as the director and he taught courses at Dartmouth College. He caused a controversy by placing an oversized sculpture X-Delta by Mark di Suvero in the middle of a highly trafficked part of campus.

In 1983, at the Pérez Art Museum Miami (previously called Center for the Fine Arts in Miami) van der Marck invited Christo and Jeanne-Claude to wrap 11 islands in Biscayne Bay in pink fabric, later named Surrounded Islands. Van der Marck also worked with Christo and Jeanne-Claude on the work Running Fence in 1976.

Van der Marck was the chief curator at the Detroit Institute of Arts (DIA) from 1986 until 1995. In 1995, van der Marck was fired from his role due to a residency violation, he was required to live in Detroit and he was spending significant time in Huntington Woods instead.

He died of cancer on April 26, 2010, in Huntington Woods, Michigan, at the age of 80.

== Personal life ==
He married Ingeborg Lachmann in 1961; she died in 1988. His second wife was Sheila van der Marck, née Stamell.
