= Northland Country Club =

Private organization in Dulth, Minnesota

- Interactive map of Northland Country Club
- 46°49′32″N 92°02′53″W

Club information
- Location: Duluth, Minnesota
- Established: 1899
- Type: Private
- Tota holes: 18
- Website: northlandcountryclub.com
- Designed by: Donald Ross
- Par: 71
- Length: 6,825 yards
- Course rating: 73.1
- Slope rating: 133

Northland Country Club is a private country club in Duluth, Minnesota. It was established in 1899. In 1927, Northland was renovated by golf course architect Donald Ross. It features bent grass fairways and greens.

== Scorecard ==
Hole	Par	Blue	White	Hole	Par	Blue	White
Hole 1	Par 4	428 yards	418 yards	Hole 10	Par 4	414 yards	391 yards
Hole 2	Par 4	324 yards	313 yards	Hole 11	Par 5	486 yards	471 yards
Hole 3	Par 4	380 yards	357 yards	Hole 12	Par 3	203 yards	176 yards
Hole 4	Par 5	490 yards	471 yards	Hole 13	Par 4	430 yards	415 yards
Hole 5	Par 3	160 yards	147 yards	Hole 14	Par 4	445 yards	410 yards
Hole 6	Par 4	380 yards	367 yards	Hole 15	Par 4	411 yards	385 yards
Hole 7	Par 4	436 yards	410 yards	Hole 16	Par 4	446 yards	408 yards
Hole 8	Par 3	230 yards	206 yards	Hole 17	Par 3	165 yards	150 yards
Hole 9	Par 5	569 yards	544 yards	Hole 18	Par 4	428 yards	412 yards

== Recognition ==
Northland Country Club is recognized as #87 on Golfweek's 2010 top 100 classic courses list

== See also ==
- List of Donald Ross designed courses
