= Sonny Eliot =

American meteorologist and comedian (1920–2012)

- Born: Marvin Schlossberg; December 5, 1920
- Died: November 16, 2012 (aged 91)
- Occupations: Weatherman, actor, and comedian
- Years active: 1947–2010
- Notable work: At The Zoo

Marvin Schlossberg, known professionally as Sonny Eliot (December 5, 1920 – November 16, 2012), was an American meteorologist, actor and comedian, who was known for making jokes during his weather broadcasts.

== Biography ==
Sonny Eliot was born on December 5, 1920, as the youngest of seven children, into a Jewish family. Eliot attended Wayne State University, and served in World War II as a B-24 bomber pilot. During the war he spent 18 months as a prisoner of war. He became a weatherman in 1947. He was known for his jokes during broadcasts.

Eliot started broadcasting Detroit weather on WWJ-TV (now WDIV-TV on channel 4) from the 1947 to 1980. He later forecast for WJBK-TV (channel 2) Detroit from 1980 to 1983, and also hosted a movie series on WKBD-TV (channel 50). He was known for his jokes during his weather broadcast and combining words together (e.g., showers and foggy became "shoggy" weather). He also hosted the Detroit show At The Zoo, which was filmed at the Detroit Zoo. It would last 17 years, and aired on WWJ-TV/WDIV-TV. Eliot also appeared on many TV shows and commercials.

In 2005 Eliot was inducted into the Michigan Journalism Hall of Fame. Eliot retired from broadcasting in September 2010 and died on November 16, 2012, at the age of 91. Wayne State University hosted a tribute for Eliot.
