= Penobscot Valley Country Club =

- Interactive map of Penobscot Valley Country Club
- 44°51′36″N 68°41′21″W

Club information
- Location: Orono, Maine, United States
- Owner: Penobscot Valley CC LLC.
- Operator: Resurrection Golf LLC.
- Tota holes: 18
- Tournaments: 2009 North Atlantic Conference Men's Golf Championship
- Website: www.penobscotvalleyCC.com

Penobby
- Designed by: Donald Ross
- Par: 72
- Length: 6442 yards
- Course rating: 71.2

Penobscot Valley Country Club is a golf course in Orono, Maine designed by Donald Ross in 1924. In September 2017, the club was taken over by Penobscot Valley CC LLC. & was operated by Resurrection Golf, a Maine-based golf course ownership & management company. After going on the market, they sold in 2025 to the owners of Lucerne Country Club for $3 Million Dollars. A brand new clubhouse was built in 2001. The club has played host to many regional amateur tournaments, and in 2009 it hosted the North Atlantic Conference Men's Golf Championship.
