= Birchwood Country Club =

Private golf club in Connecticut

Coordinates: 41.129°N 73.375°W

- Interactive map of Birchwood Country Club

Club information
- Location: Westport, Connecticut, U.S.
- Established: 1911; 115 years ago 1924 (expansion); 1946 (redesign)
- Type: Private
- Total holes: 9
- Website: Official website
- Designer: Donald Ross (1924), Orrin E. Smith (1946)
- Par: 36
- Length: 3,157 yards (2,887 m)

Birchwood Country Club is a private country club at 25 Kings Highway South in Westport, Connecticut, with a nine-hole golf course, tennis, paddle and pickleball courts, and a swimming pool. It is the only private club in Westport with a golf course.

The club was organized in 1946 on the roughly 83-acre (34 ha) grounds of the defunct Westport Country Club (later the Westport Golf & Country Club), which had operated on the site from 1911 until play stopped around 1942. The front of Birchwood's clubhouse is the farmhouse built by Josiah Raymond, who settled the land around 1790.

== History ==
=== Westport Country Club ===
The Westport Country Club was incorporated in 1911 by a group of local residents including Horace Staples and James Earle Fraser. It began on leased land in the West Saugatuck section of town and opened its first clubhouse in October 1912. In 1916 the club bought its own grounds.

In the early 1920s, under the leadership of club President Frederick M. Salmon, the club acquired neighboring land, including the farm of the Raymond family, and in 1924, opened an expanded 18-hole course designed by Donald Ross. This new course was roughly 6,000 yards and had a par of 71. The Raymond farmhouse also became the clubhouse.

Postcard of the Westport Country Club clubhouse, Westport, Connecticut, c. 1940

The Westport Country Club’s 18-hole course in a 1934 aerial survey

The club was reorganized as the Westport Golf & Country Club in 1934. Play stopped around 1942, and the property was lost to foreclosure in 1943 and 1944. Parts of the property were subsequently subdivided and sold off. During this time, the town of Westport attempted to purchase the property and planned to use it as either a civic center or a municipal golf course.

=== Birchwood Country Club ===
In 1946 a group of Jewish residents, many of them returning World War II veterans, bought the property and founded Birchwood Country Club. They started a club of their own because Jews were barred from the existing clubs in the area. Its founders included real estate investor Lawrence A. Wien, the club's first President, as well as attorney, Leo Nevas. The club opened on Memorial Day 1946. A new nine-hole course, designed by Orrin E. Smith, a protégé of Willie Park Jr. and Donald Ross, replaced the old 18 holes, and part of the former course land was sold for residential development. The course is now widely considered one of the top nine-hole golf courses in the country: Golf Digest has ranked it the sixth-best nine-hole course in the United States, and was featured in the Anthony Pioppi’s book The Finest Nines: The Best Nine-Hole Golf Courses in North America as a top 25 nine-hole course.
