= Mark Twain Golf Course =

Golf course in Town of Horseheads, New York

Coordinates: 42°08′14″N 76°50′00″W

The Mark Twain Golf Course is a public 18 hole golf course in the Town of Horseheads that is owned and operated by the City of Elmira, New York. It was designed by the golf course architect Donald Ross. It was built in 1937 as a public works project during the Great Depression by the Works Progress Administration. The course was named after Mark Twain, who lived nearby.
