= Rackham Graduate School =

Graduate school of the University of Michigan

Coordinates: 42°16′52″N 83°44′18″W

Horace H. Rackham School of Graduate Studies
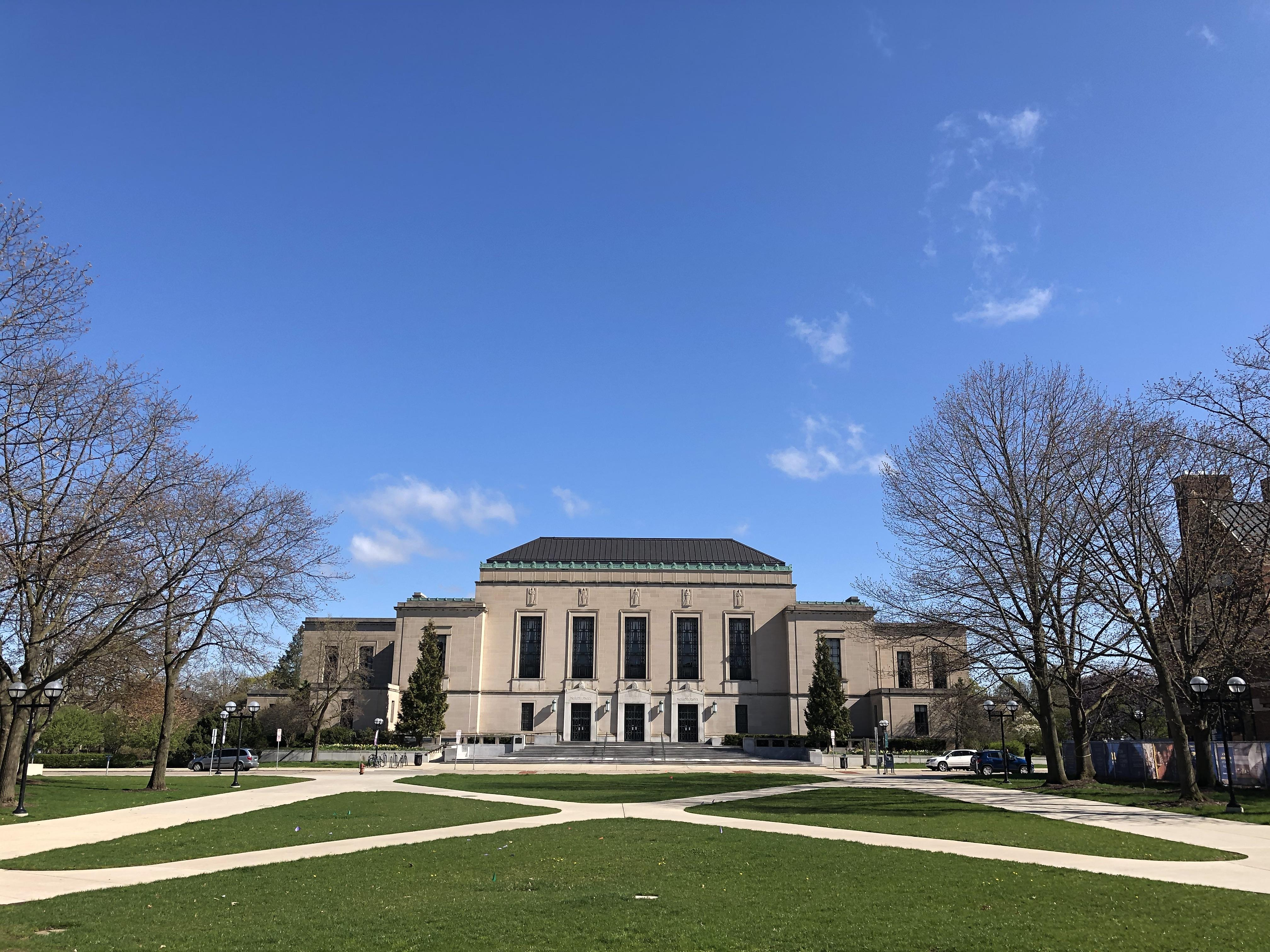
- The Rackham Building in Ann Arbor
- Other name: Rackham Graduate School
- Former name: Graduate Department (1912–1935)
- Type: Graduate school
- Established: 1912; 114 years ago
- Parent institution: University of Michigan
- Accreditation: HLC
- Dean: Mike Solomon
- Students: 11,060 (2024)
- Location: Ann Arbor, Michigan
- Website: rackham.umich.edu

The Horace H. Rackham School of Graduate Studies, commonly known as the Rackham Graduate School, is the graduate school of the University of Michigan. Founded in 1912 with an endowment from Mary Rackham, the wife of Horace Rackham, in 1935, the Rackham Graduate School is responsible for almost all of the university's graduate degree and certificate programs. The school offers more than 180 master's and doctorate degree programs.

The graduate school administration is located in the Rackham Building on E. Washington Street in Ann Arbor. The building was designed by William Kapp of the firm Smith, Hinchman & Grylls with architectural sculpture by Corrado Parducci.
