= Corrado Parducci =

American sculptor

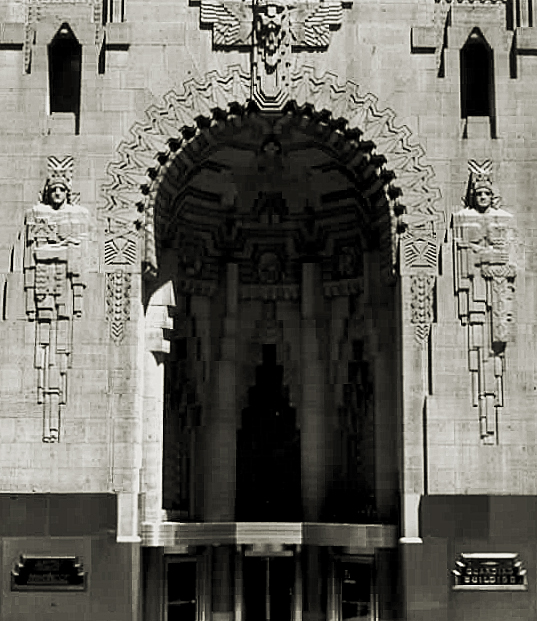
Guardian Building, Detroit, Michigan

Corrado Giuseppe Parducci (March 10, 1900 – November 22, 1981) was an Italian-American architectural sculptor who was a celebrated artist for his numerous early-20th century works.

== Early life and education ==
Parducci was born to Giulio Parducci and Zelinda Petragnani in Buti, Italy, a small village near Pisa, and immigrated to New York City in the United States in 1904. At a young age, he was sponsored by heiress/sculptor Gertrude Vanderbilt Whitney and sent to art school. He attended the Beaux-Arts Institute of Design and Art Students League. His teachers included anatomist George Bridgman and sculptor Albin Polasek.

== Training and career ==
Parducci was apprenticed to architectural sculptor Ulysses Ricci in 1917. While working for Ricci, and later while in the Anthony DiLorenzo studio, his work came to the attention of Detroit architect Albert Kahn.

In 1924 Parducci traveled to Detroit to work for Kahn, only planning to stay for a few months. However, with the automotive industry booming in the 1920s, Parducci moved his family to Michigan and ended up spending the rest of his career working from Detroit. One of Parducci's known Detroit studios was located at Cass Ave. and Sibley St., but it has been demolished. Parducci's studio had tall windows which illuminated his work. Parducci's work can be found on many of the Detroit area's finest buildings including churches, schools, banks, hospitals, and residences.

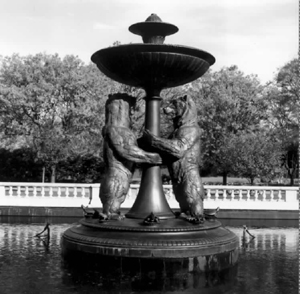
Rackham Fountain, Detroit Zoo

His sculptures can be found in most major Michigan cities including Ann Arbor, Dearborn, Flint, Grand Rapids, Jackson, Kalamazoo, Marquette, Royal Oak, Saginaw, Midland and Ypsilanti. By the end of his long and productive career, Parducci's efforts adorned about 600 buildings.

The last commission Parducci completed was a portrait of architect Henry Hobson Richardson in a Romanesque setting that was carved on a lintel in the Senate chamber of the New York State Capitol in Albany, New York in 1980.

Although Parducci worked in a variety of styles, notably Romanesque, Classical, Renaissance, and even Aztec/Mayan/Pueblo Deco, it was his pioneering of the Greco Deco style for which he is best remembered.

== Parducci's Detroit Masonic Temple lobby ==
Anthony Di Lorenzo, New York ornamentalist, held two contracts for interior decoration in the Detroit Masonic Temple - #1 (Corrado Parducci) $13,160.00 and #2 for $9,680.00. Thomas Di Lorenzo's contract for interior decoration amounted to $59,074.00. Joe (Corrado) Parducci worked in the New York firm of Ricci, Ardolino and Di Lorenzo as a very young man. When the firm broke up, he stayed with DiLorenzo who was an ornamentalist and Parducci was the sculptor. Parducci met Albert Kahn in New York City who urged him to come to Detroit and work on two bank buildings on Griswold Street. Parducci came to Detroit to work for only a couple of months. Anthony DiLorenzo had some work here and Kahn wanted Parducci. He worked indirectly for Kahn through DiLorenzo. Other work came from Detroit architects Donaldson & Meier, Smith, Hinchman & Grylls, and George D. Mason.

The first 8 months, 1924 to middle of 1925, Parducci worked under DiLorenzo. The Masonic Temple contracts were DiLorenzos' jobs until Parducci bought them out for $5,000.00.

Parducci's lobby design was reportedly adapted from an old castle in Palermo, Sicily. Parducci did model the 5' bronze floor plaque depicting Strength, Truth and Beauty. He sculpted the two plaques in the stone walls of the interior stairs of the Scottish Rite entrance. These two are repeated in the lobby as plaster plaques.

== List of buildings containing Parducci's art ==
- St. Thomas the Apostle Church (1923)
- The Players (1925)
- Buhl Building (1925)
- The Park Shelton (1926)
- Grand Rapids Trust Building (1926)
- Penobscot Building (1928)
- Detroit Zoo Rackham Memorial Fountain
- Webster Hall, Wayne State University (Demolished in 1991)
- David Stott Building (1929)
- Detroit Masonic Temple (1926)
- Wilson Theater, now Music Hall (1926)
- Edsel and Eleanor Ford House (1927)
- Lee Plaza (1929)
- Fisher Building (1929)
- Meadow Brook Hall (1929)
- Guardian Building (1929)
- Louisiana State Capitol (1929)
- Shrine of the Little Flower (1930s–1940s)
- Central Mutual Insurance Company Home Office (Van Wert, Ohio) (1931)
- Detroit Federal Building (1934)
- Lewis Maire Elementary School (Grosse Pointe, MI) (1936)
- St. Peter Cathedral (Marquette, Michigan) (1938)
- Horace H. Rackham School of Graduate Studies Building, University of Michigan, Ann Arbor (1938)
- Cathedral of the Most Blessed Sacrament (1940s–1950s)
- Detroit Historical Museum (1951)
- The Shrine of the Holy Innocents at Queen of Heaven Cemetery in Chicago. (Memorial for the victims of the 1958 Our Lady of the Angels school fire). (c.1959)

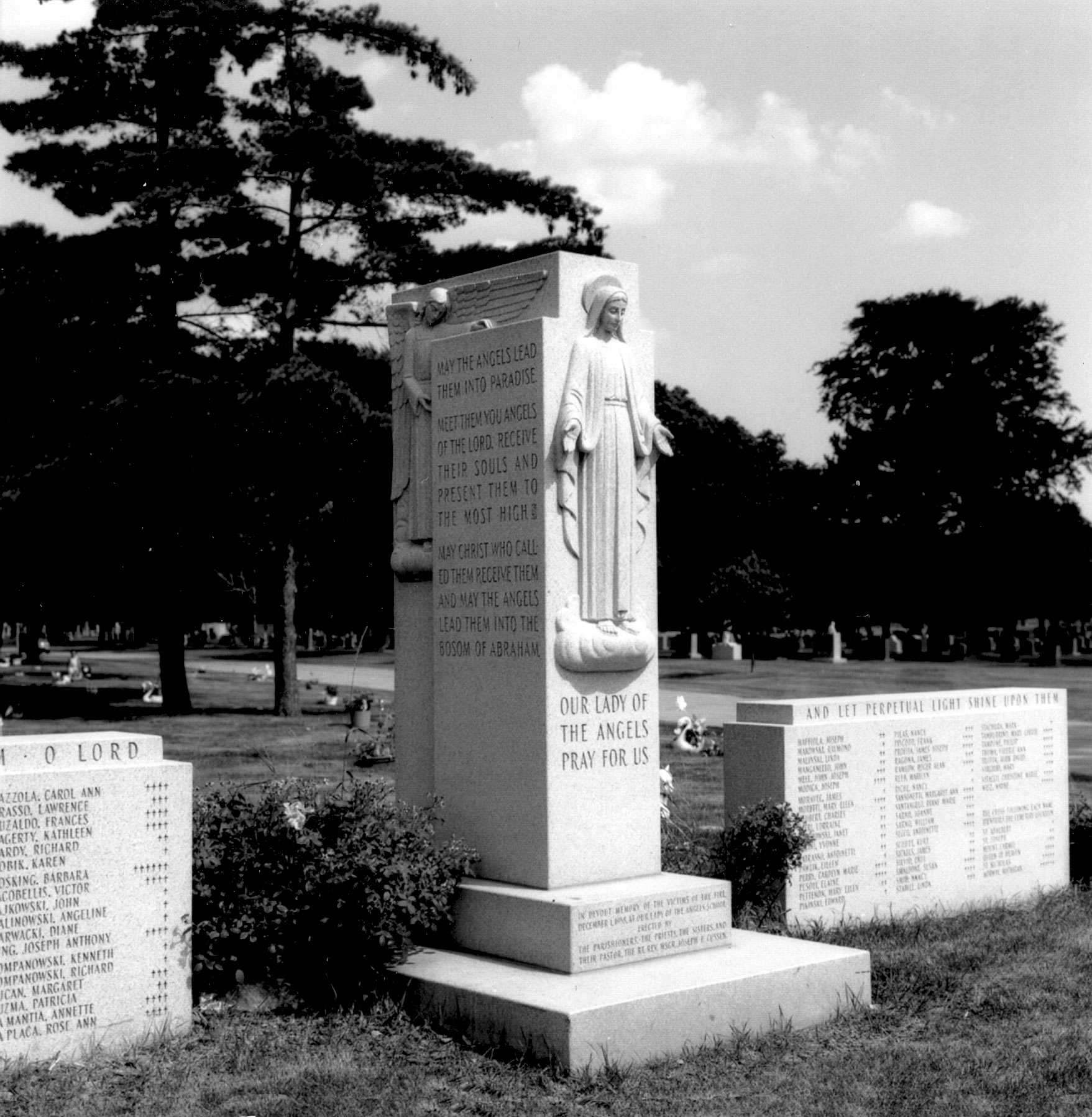
Shrine of the Holy Innocents

- Ann Arbor News Building, 1936
- Trinity Lutheran Church
- Charles T. Fisher Residence
- Alfred J. Fisher Residence
- William A. Fisher Residence
- Frank Couzens Residence
- Stewart-Warner Speedometer Corporation Building
- Kresge Building
- Springwells Water Treatment Plant
- Hudson Motor Car Factory (Demolished)
- St. Aloysius Church
- St. John's Seminary, now The Inn At St. Johns
- University of Detroit Mercy
- Standard Club of Chicago
- Second National Bank of Saginaw
- Kalamazoo Gazette Building, Kalamazoo, Michigan
- Kalamazoo County Building, Kalamazoo
- Midland Theater (Demolished 1998) recast in bronze and relocated to Ned S. Arbury Centennial Park (1942) Midland, Michigan

== See also ==
- Architecture of metropolitan Detroit
