= Detroit Zoo =

Zoo in Oakland County, Michigan, United States

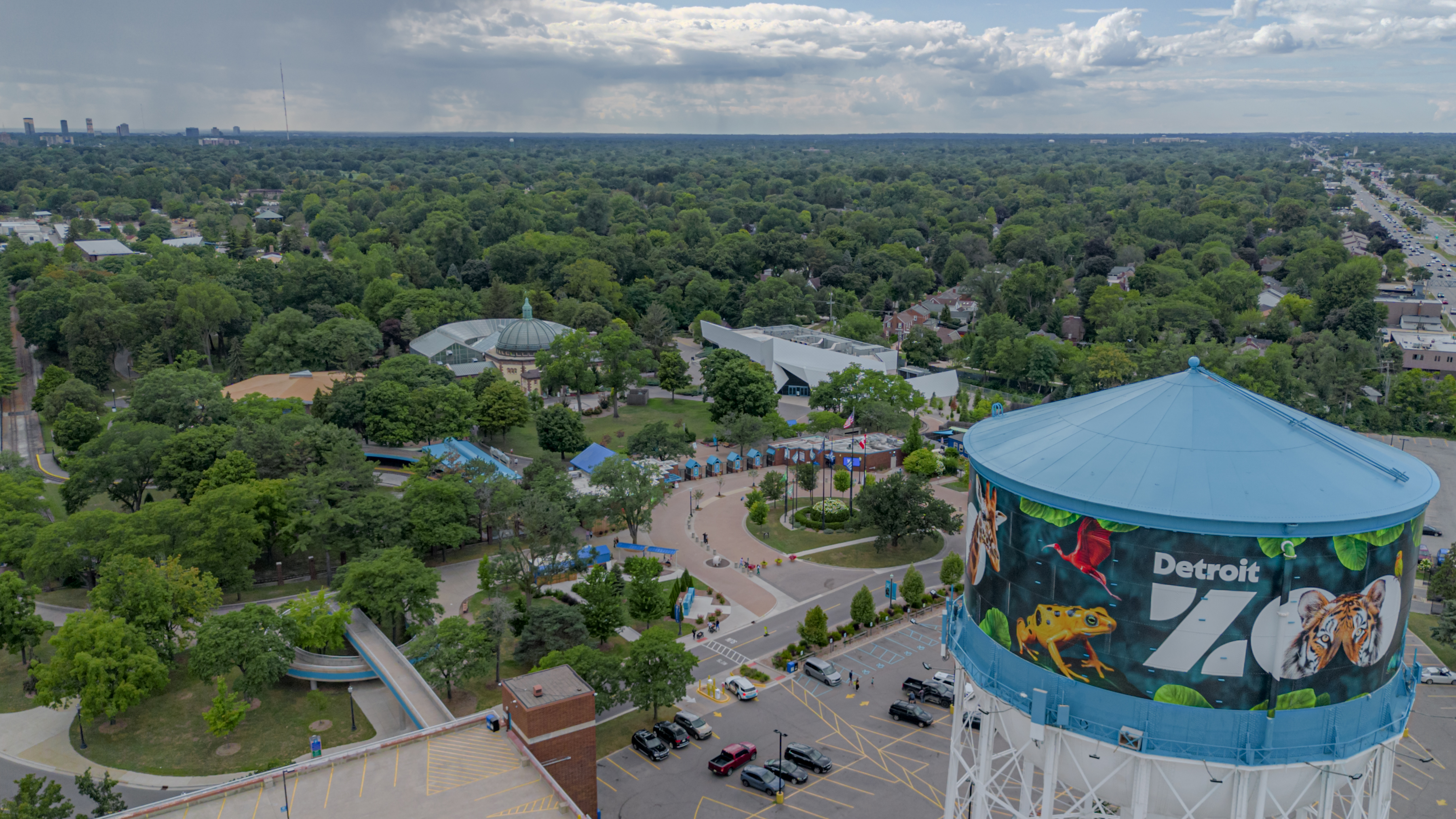
- Aerial view of the zoo in 2025
- Interactive map of Detroit Zoo
- 42°28′37″N 83°09′25″W
- Date opened: August 1, 1928
- Location: Huntington Woods/Royal Oak, Michigan, U.S.
- Land area: 125 acres (51 ha)
- No. of animals: 2,000+
- No. of species: 245+
- Annual visitors: 1.5+ million
- Memberships: AZA, AAM, WAZA
- Owner: City of Detroit
- Management: Detroit Zoological Society
- Public transit: SMART
- Website: detroitzoo.org
- Detroit Zoological Park
- U.S. National Register of Historic Places
- Architect: Arthur Asahel Shurcliff; Heinrich Hagenbeck
- NRHP reference No.: 90001226
- Added to NRHP: August 24, 1990

The Detroit Zoo is a zoo located in the cities of Huntington Woods and Royal Oak in the U.S. state of Michigan. Spanning 125 acres (50.6 ha), it is home to more than 2,000 animals and more than 200 different species. The zoo was the first U.S. zoo to feature bar-less habitats, and is regarded as an international leader in animal welfare, conservation and sustainability by the Detroit Zoological Society. The zoo is owned by the City of Detroit and has been operated since its opening by the Detroit Zoological Society, a 501(c)(3) nonprofit organization.

== History ==
The original Detroit Zoo opened in 1883, on Michigan and Trumbull Avenues, across from Tiger Stadium. William Cameron Coup's circus had arrived in town, only to be forfeited and put up for auction due to financial difficulties. Luther Beecher, a local businessman, financed the purchase of the circus’s animals and erected a building for their display which he called the Detroit Zoological Garden. This iteration of the Zoo closed the following year, with the building converted into a horse auction site (the Michigan Avenue Horse Exchange).

The Detroit Zoological Society was founded several years later, in 1911, but the Zoo's official opening did not occur until August 1, 1928. During the opening ceremony, acting Mayor John C. Nagel was to speak; he arrived late, and (unknowingly) parked his car behind the bear exhibits. Upon exiting his vehicle, a polar bear, kept in one of the original “barrier-less” enclosures, attempted to lunge at the mayor, nearly crossing the protective moat around its exhibit. Nagel stuck out his hand and walked toward the polar bear joking, "He's the reception committee." The keepers rushed to the bear and forced him back into the exhibit, leaving the mayor uninjured.

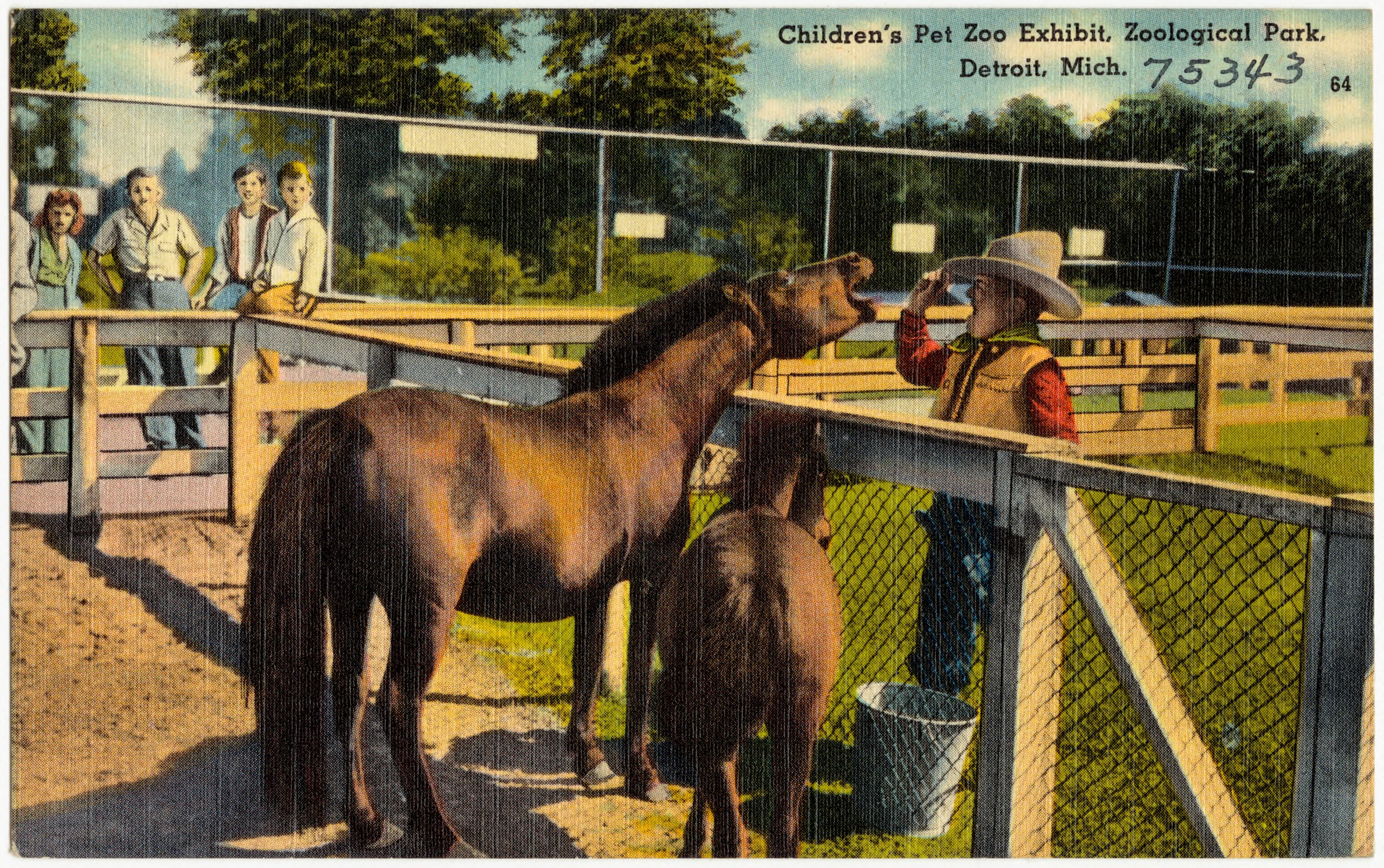
Children's pet zoo exhibit, c. 1930-1945.

By 1930, the zoo included the Bear Dens, Sheep Rocks, the Bird House, an elk exhibit, Baboon Rock, and Primate and Reptile Houses. The Great Depression brought a halt to additional expansion, until the 1940s, and expansion has continued ever since. During the Depression, one of the more popular animals was ‘Jo Mendi’, a four-year-old chimpanzee purchased by the zoo director with his own funds. A veteran of Broadway musicals and motion pictures, the chimp performed for the crowds. One press account stated, "he enjoys every minute of the act...He counts his fingers, dresses, laces his shoes, straps up his overalls; pours tea and drinks it; eats with a spoon, dances and waves farewell to his admirers." When the chimpanzee fell ill in late 1932, after eating a guest-thrown penny, surgeons from area hospitals came to assess his condition. During his recovery, visitors brought toys, peanuts and more than $500 worth of flowers, along with several thousand cards and letters. Jo died two years later, in 1934, from hoof and mouth disease.

In 1939, funded by a donation from Mary Rackham, the sculptor Corrado Parducci created the Horace Rackham Memorial Fountain, known as "the Bear Fountain."

From the 1950s through the early 1970s, local weatherman Sonny Eliot hosted a program called At The Zoo, shown on Saturdays on Detroit television station WDIV.

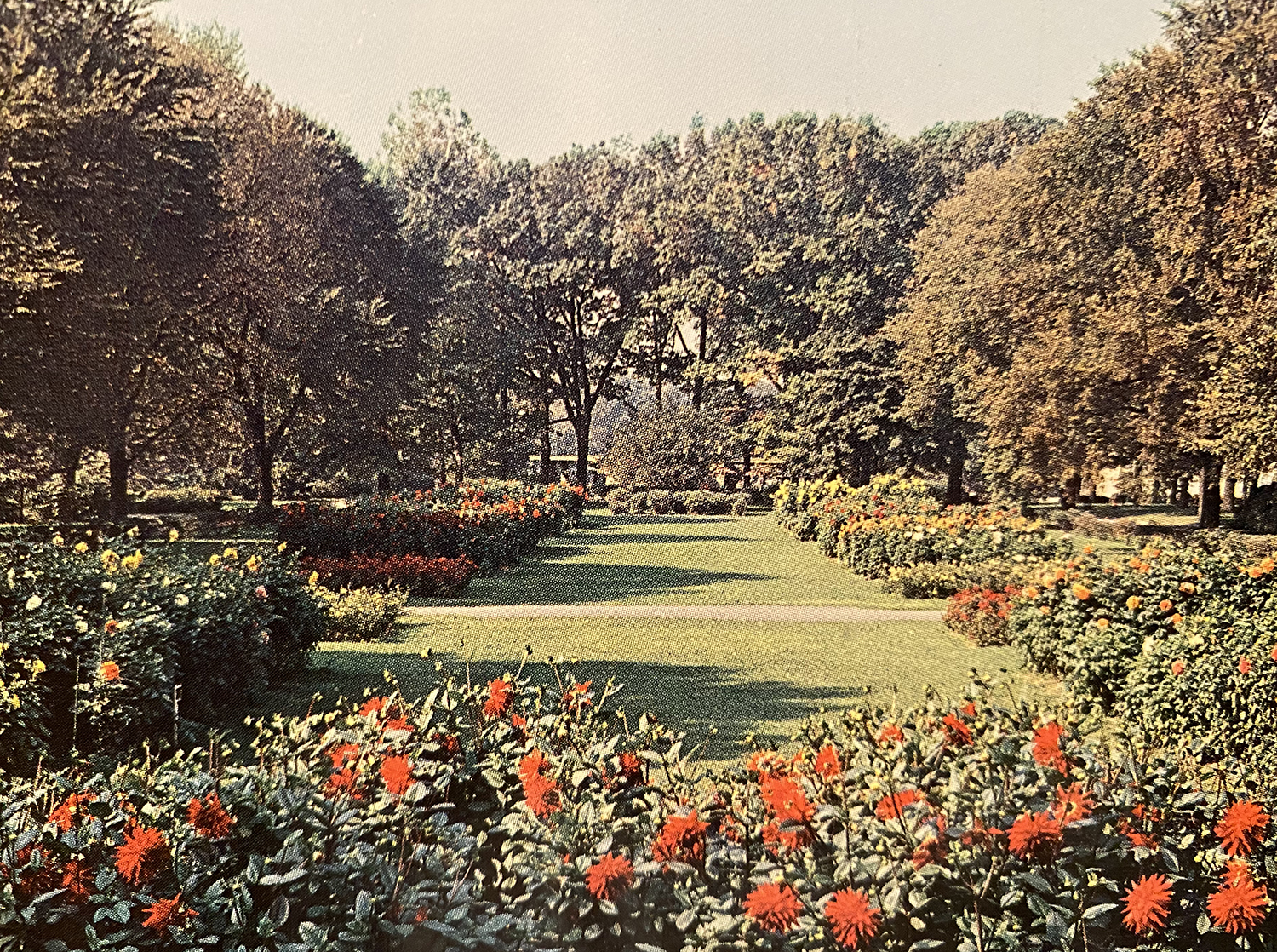
Dahlia Garden to the west of Rackham Memorial Fountain in 1963, cultivated and maintained by Thomas Fred Roberts.

In 1950, the zoo hired senior floriculturist Thomas (Fred) Roberts. Roberts was a recognized expert on dahlias; his gardens at the zoo, particularly the dahlia exhibit to the west of the Rackham Memorial Fountain, attracted visitors from across the country. Throughout the mid-century era, and into the 1980s, the zoo's gardens were elaborate displays of perennials, flowers, and tropical houseplants. Sonny Eliot interviewed Roberts for one of his episodes of At The Zoo. Fred Roberts remained at the zoo until 1978. His garden designs were maintained through the 1980s.

Until 1982, trained chimpanzees performed for visitors, but the act was discontinued at the insistence of animal rights activists. In 1982, the zoo began to charge an admission fee.

The Arctic Ring of Life, one of North America's largest polar bear habitats, opened in 2001. Centered around a 300,000 gallon aquarium, it allows visitors to view polar bears from a 70-foot underwater tunnel made of clear acrylic. Other new buildings include the Ruth Roby Glancy Animal Health Complex (2004) and the Ford Education Center (2005), which offers school and youth group programs as well as having a theater and exhibit space.

Detroit Zoo entrance and water tower, 2001

In 2005 the Zoo became the first in the U.S. to no longer keep elephants for ethical reasons, claiming the Michigan winters were too harsh for the animals and that confining them was stressful. The elephants, Wanda and Winky, were relocated to the Performing Animal Welfare Society's (PAWS) sanctuary in San Andreas, California. Winky died in April 2008; Wanda died in February 2015. The former elephant exhibit was renovated and is now home to two white rhinoceros, Jasiri and Tamba.

The Australian Outback Adventure, opened in 2006, allows visitors to walk through a simulated Outback containing red kangaroos and red-necked wallabies. Nothing separates visitors from the marsupials, allowing the animals to hop freely onto the walking path.

On February 18, 2006, the Detroit City Council voted to shut down the Zoo as part of budget cuts, being unable to reach an agreement with the Society to take over the park and a legislative grant having expired that day. An uproar ensued and the Council, on March 1, 2006, voted to transfer operations to the Society with a promised $4 million grant from the Michigan Legislature. The city retained ownership of the assets, including the Zoo in Royal Oak and the Belle Isle Nature Center in Detroit. The Society is responsible for governance, management and operations, including creating a plan to raise funds for long-term operations. On August 5, 2008, voters in Macomb, Oakland, and Wayne counties overwhelmingly passed a zoo tax that provides sustainable funding to supplement earned revenue and philanthropic support.

The Penguinarium was temporarily renamed the "Winguinarium" in 2009 while the Detroit Red Wings played the Pittsburgh Penguins in the 2009 Stanley Cup Finals.

Video of the Tauber Family Railroad

In 2011, the lions' enclosure was remodeled, providing animals more than double the room, new landscaping, and a glass wall to allow closer encounters with visitors. The Zoo also has the Simulator Ride, a 4-D Theater, the Tauber Family Railroad and a carousel.

In 2013, the Zoo celebrated its single largest donation ever ($10 million) by announcing plans for the Polk Penguin Conservation Center (PPCC), which opened in 2016. The Center replaces the Penguinarium (which itself was revolutionary when built in 1968) and became the world's largest facility dedicated to the study of penguins. The Penguinarium will be converted into event space.

In 2017, a biodigester was installed to convert manure and food waste into methane, which is then used to power the zoo's animal hospital.

On July 6, 2019, the Zoo celebrated the birth of Keti, a red panda cub, born after a 4-month gestation period.

In September 2019, the Penguin Center was closed for waterproofing repairs. The penguins were moved back to the original Penguinarium (their home from 1968 to 2015) until the Polk Center reopened. The center reopened on February 14, 2022 after delays due to the COVID-19 pandemic. It contains 5 species of penguins; King, Macaroni, Gentoo, Chinstrap and Rockhopper.

== Habitats ==
=== National Amphibian Conservation Center ===
The National Amphibian Conservation Center is a $7 million, 12,000-square-foot facility situated on a two-acre Michigan wetland area and pond called "Amphibiville". The Center, which opened in June 2000, has a diverse range of frogs, toads, salamanders, newts and caecilians. The Wall Street Journal dubbed the attraction "Disneyland for toads". The Center participates in research and conservation efforts for species including the Panamanian golden frog, Puerto Rican crested toad, and Wyoming toad.

In 2002, the Zoo was awarded the AZA National Exhibit Award for Amphibiville.

=== The Arctic Ring of Life ===
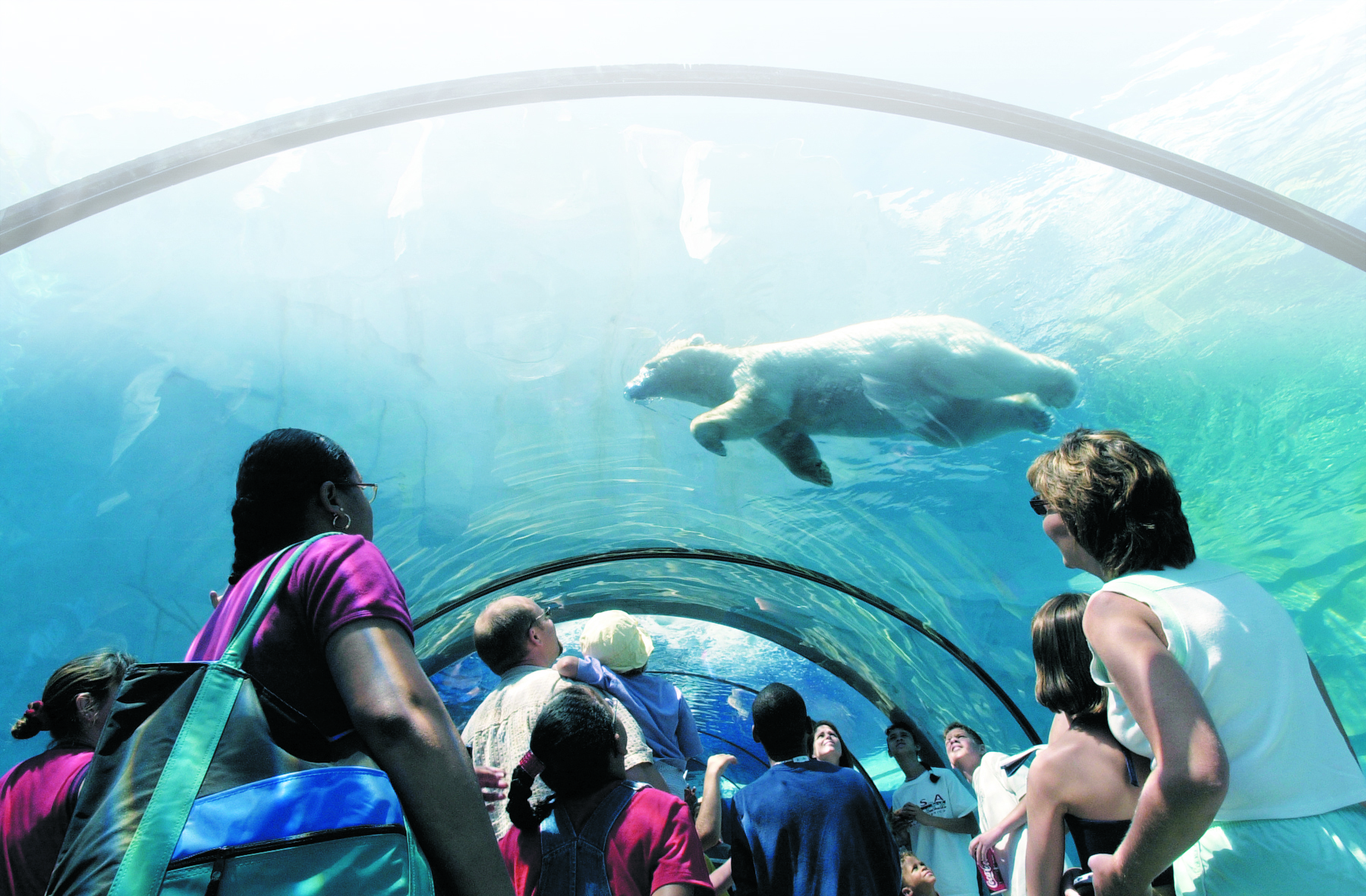
Tunnel through the polar bear exhibit.

The 4-acre Arctic Ring of Life, opened in October 2001, is home to three polar bears and two southern sea otters. It is among the largest polar bear habitats in North American zoos. In 2003, the Zoo was awarded the AZA Significant Achievement Award for the Arctic Ring of Life.

=== Cotton Family Wetlands and Boardwalk ===
Mimicking a Michigan ecosystem, the 1.7-acre pond and wetlands area and accompanying 7,200-square-foot boardwalk is home to native fish, frogs, turtles and birds as well as trumpeter swans. The boardwalk is made from 95-percent recycled material composed primarily of plastic grocery bags and reclaimed hardwood. The Wetlands and Boardwalk are bounded by Amphibiville, the Warchol Beaver Habitat, the Edward Mardigian Sr. River Otter Habitat, and the Holden Reptile Conservation Center.

Due to a $102,350 grant from NOAA, the Wetlands are also used as professional development and outdoor classroom for teachers and students underrepresented in science fields.

=== Cotton Family Wolf Wilderness ===
The Cotton Family Wolf Wilderness is a $1.4 million two-acre sanctuary that features native meadows and trees, a flowing stream and pond, dens, and elevated rock outcroppings, for two gray wolves. The habitat also incorporates a renovated historic log cabin which had existed on the property.

=== Giraffe Encounter ===
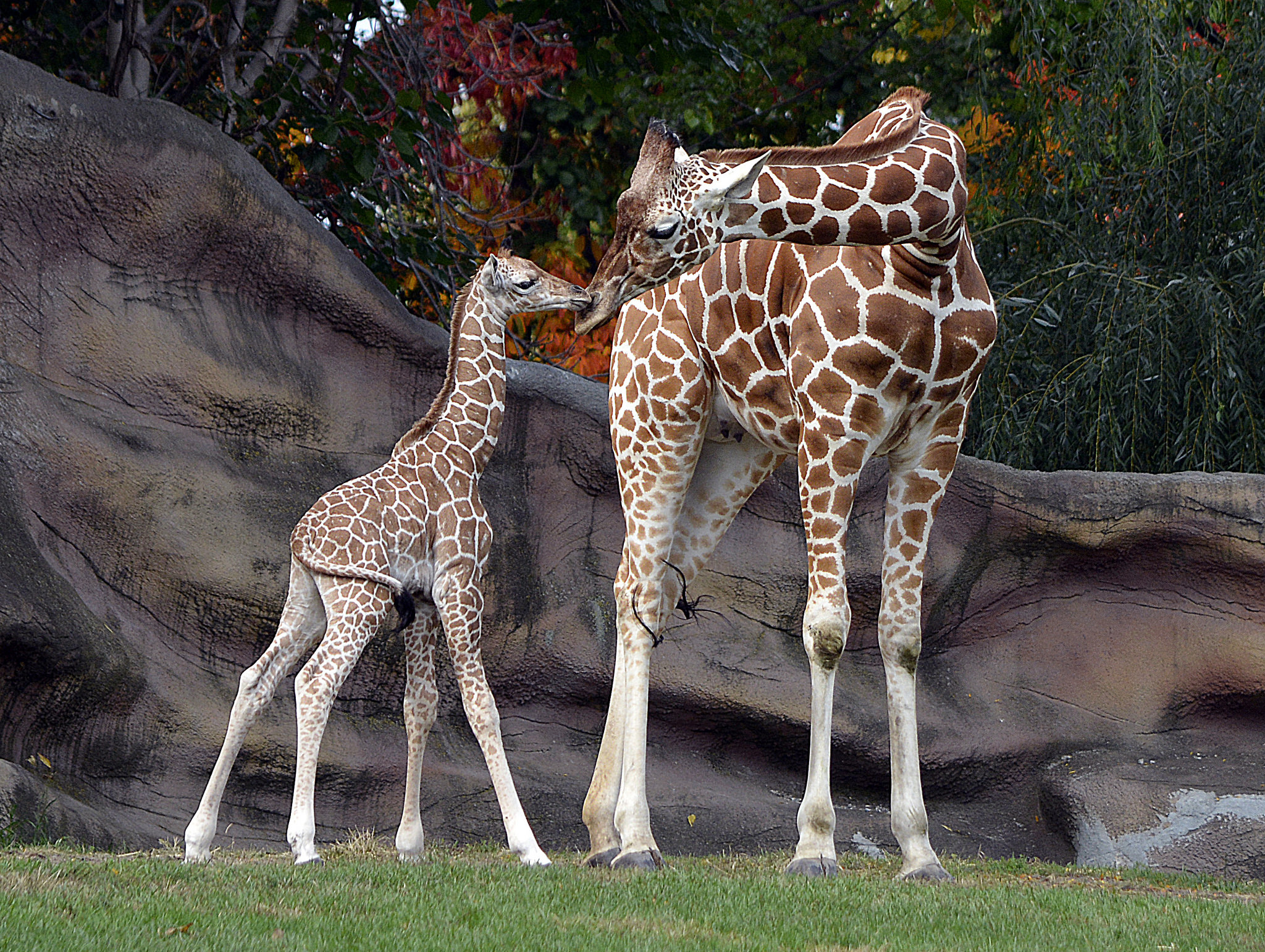
Giraffes at the Giraffe Encounter.

The guests feed reticulated giraffes from an 18-foot-tall platform that extends into their habitat in the Giraffe Encounter. This experience, which started in July 2007, runs Tuesday through Sunday from spring through fall. This is an added fee.

=== The Great Apes of Harambee ===
The Great Apes of Harambee is a 4-acre indoor/outdoor habitat home to chimpanzees and western lowland gorillas. The animals may be rotated into each other's habitat spaces, simulating nomadic movement similar to wild behavior.

=== Holden Reptile Conservation Center ===
Opened as the Holden Museum of Living Reptiles in 1960, the Holden Reptile Conservation Center is home to 150 reptiles representing 70 species, 45 percent of which are considered threatened or endangered in the wild.

=== Edward Mardigian Sr. River Otter Habitat ===
The Edward Mardigian Sr. River Otter Habitat provides a habitat for North American river otters and features a 9,000-gallon pool with a waterfall and waterslide. The pool is enclosed on one side by a glass wall, on the other side of which is an observation building. The habitat affords visitors – including small children – an eye-level view of the otters as they swim.

=== Polk Penguin Conservation Center ===
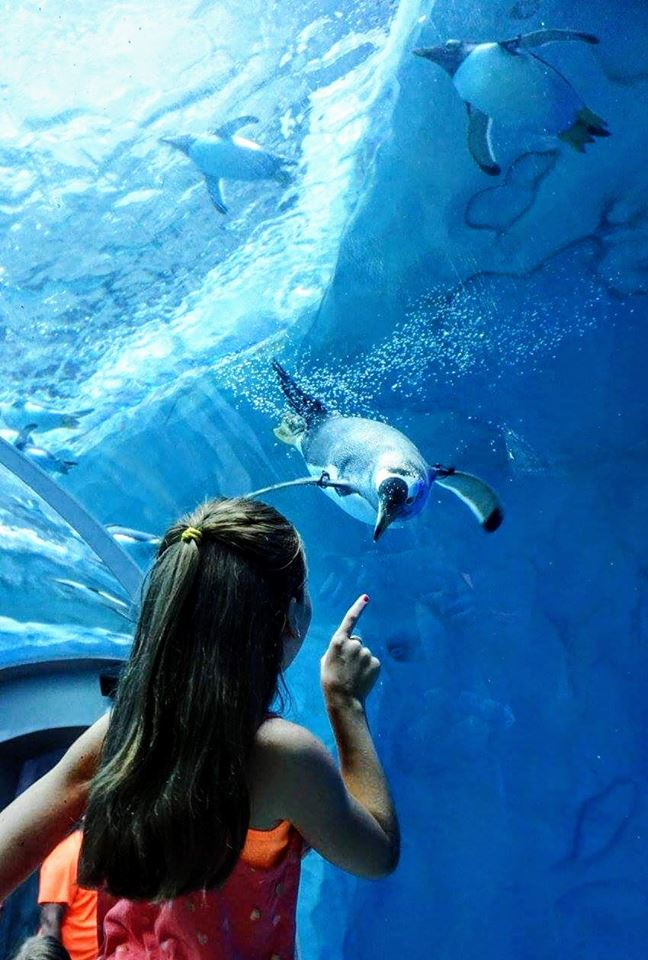
Inside viewing area of the Polk Penguin Conservation Center.

The Polk Penguin Conservation Center (PPCC), opened in April 2016, replacing the previous Penguinarium. It is the largest center for penguins in the world and was awarded the 2017 Exhibit Award by the Association of Zoos and Aquariums for excellence in exhibit design. The PPCC was closed for waterproofing repairs from September 2019 to February 14, 2022.

=== Jane and Frank Warchol Beaver Habitat ===
Opened in 2013, the Jane and Frank Warchol Beaver Habitat abuts the Cotton Family Wetlands, and is home to nine North American beavers. As beavers are nocturnal, their night-time activities are recorded and played throughout the day on televisions in the exhibit. This is the first time beavers have been on display at the Zoo since 1969.

=== The Wildlife Interpretive Gallery ===
The Wildlife Interpretive Gallery is home to the Butterfly Garden, Matilda Wilson Free-Flight Aviary, Science On a Sphere, as well as the Society's permanent fine art collection. The Shelle Isle exhibit is dedicated to the partula snail.

=== American Grassland ===
The American Grasslands are home to animals native to North and South America, including grizzly bears, wolverines, bald eagles, bison, and more. The newest animal to join the habitat is the sloth bear, which arrived in October 2024.

=== Australian Outback Adventure ===
This immersive habitat allows visitors to get face to face with two of Australia's most well-known marsupials - kangaroos and wallabies. The animals are free to roam around as guests walk alongside them.

== Detroit Zoological Society ==
The Detroit Zoological Society is a non-profit organization that operates the Zoo and the Belle Isle Nature Center. The $44.5 million annual operating budget of the organization is supported by earned revenue, philanthropic support, and tri-county (Macomb, Oakland, and Wayne) millage. The organization has 260 full and part-time employees, more than 52,000 member households, and more than 1,000 volunteers.

The mission of the organization is "Celebrating and Saving Wildlife", the Society claims to be a leader in animal conservation and welfare. In collaboration with the DNR and USFWS, the Society continues to release Zoo-reared federally endangered Karner blue butterflies in their natural habitats in Michigan. Each summer, Society bird keepers assist with conservation efforts in northern Michigan for the federally endangered Great Lakes piping plover by artificially incubating abandoned piping plover eggs. Most recently, the Society, in collaboration with the Detroit River International Wildlife Refuge and the Detroit Water and Sewerage Department, established of a common tern nesting site on Belle Isle.

The Society assists with the rescue of exotic animals from private owners, pseudo-sanctuaries, roadside zoos, and circuses. Among its rescues are more than 1,000 exotic animals confiscated from an animal wholesaler in Texas, a polar bear confiscated from a circus in Puerto Rico, a lioness used to guard a crack house, and retired racehorses. In addition, the Society and the Michigan Humane Society, in collaboration with dozens of local animal welfare organizations, host Meet Your Best Friend at the Zoo, the nation's largest offsite companion animal adoption program. Since the event's inception in 1993, more than 25,000 dogs, cats, and rabbits have been placed into new homes at the spring and fall events.

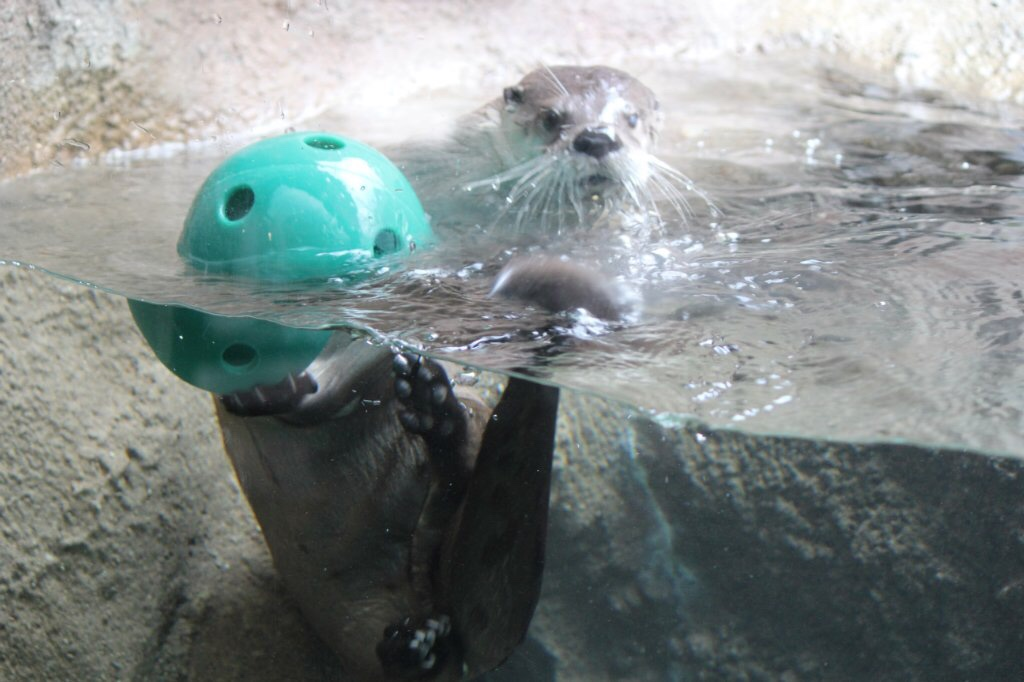
One of the research projects of the Center for Zoo and Aquarium Animal Welfare and Ethics involves the study of a river otter habitat expansion, both before and after the expanded habitat.

The Center for Zoo and Aquarium Animal Welfare and Ethics (CZAAWE) was created in 2009 as a resource center for captive exotic animal welfare knowledge and best practices. The center provides a much-needed forum for exotic animal welfare policy discussion/debate and recognizes captive exotic animal welfare initiatives through awards.

The Society provides educational experiences to nearly 70,000 teachers and students annually through camps, curriculum-based field trips, family and youth programs and professional development opportunities. The Society also supports students and teachers through conservation education in rural rainforest communities through the Adopt-A-School program. The Berman Academy for Humane Education offers a broad range of programs that help people help animals. The academy uses a variety of teaching strategies – from traditional instruction to storytelling, role-playing, theater, and virtual technology – to educate audiences about the need to treat other living creatures with empathy, respect and gentleness.

Accredited by the Association of Zoos & Aquariums, the Zoo features many award-winning habitats including the Wildlife Interpretive Gallery, National Amphibian Conservation Center, Great Apes of Harambee and Arctic Ring of Life, which was named the number-two best zoo exhibit in the U.S. by the Intrepid Traveler's guide to "America's Best Zoos".

The Simulator Ride offers an educational experience from a motion-simulated theater seat. The 126-seat 4-D Theater, the only of its kind at any Michigan zoo, features special effects such as blasts of wind, mist and scents.

=== Belle Isle Nature Center ===
The Belle Isle Nature Center sits on a five-acre site surrounded by undisturbed forested wetlands on Belle Isle State Park in Detroit. The facility features indoor animal habitats, a bee exhibit, bird observation window, an outdoor native butterfly garden, outdoor classrooms, nature play area and the Blue Heron Lagoon Nature Trail. It provides year-round educational, recreational and environmental conservation opportunities for the community.

== Gallery ==
Main gate to the zoo

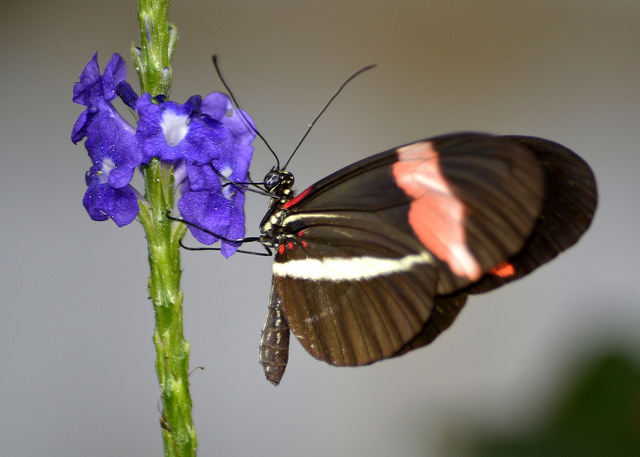
Butterfly at the Butterfly Garden

Pink-backed pelicans (Pelecanus rufescens)

Zebra habitat

Kisa the Tiger

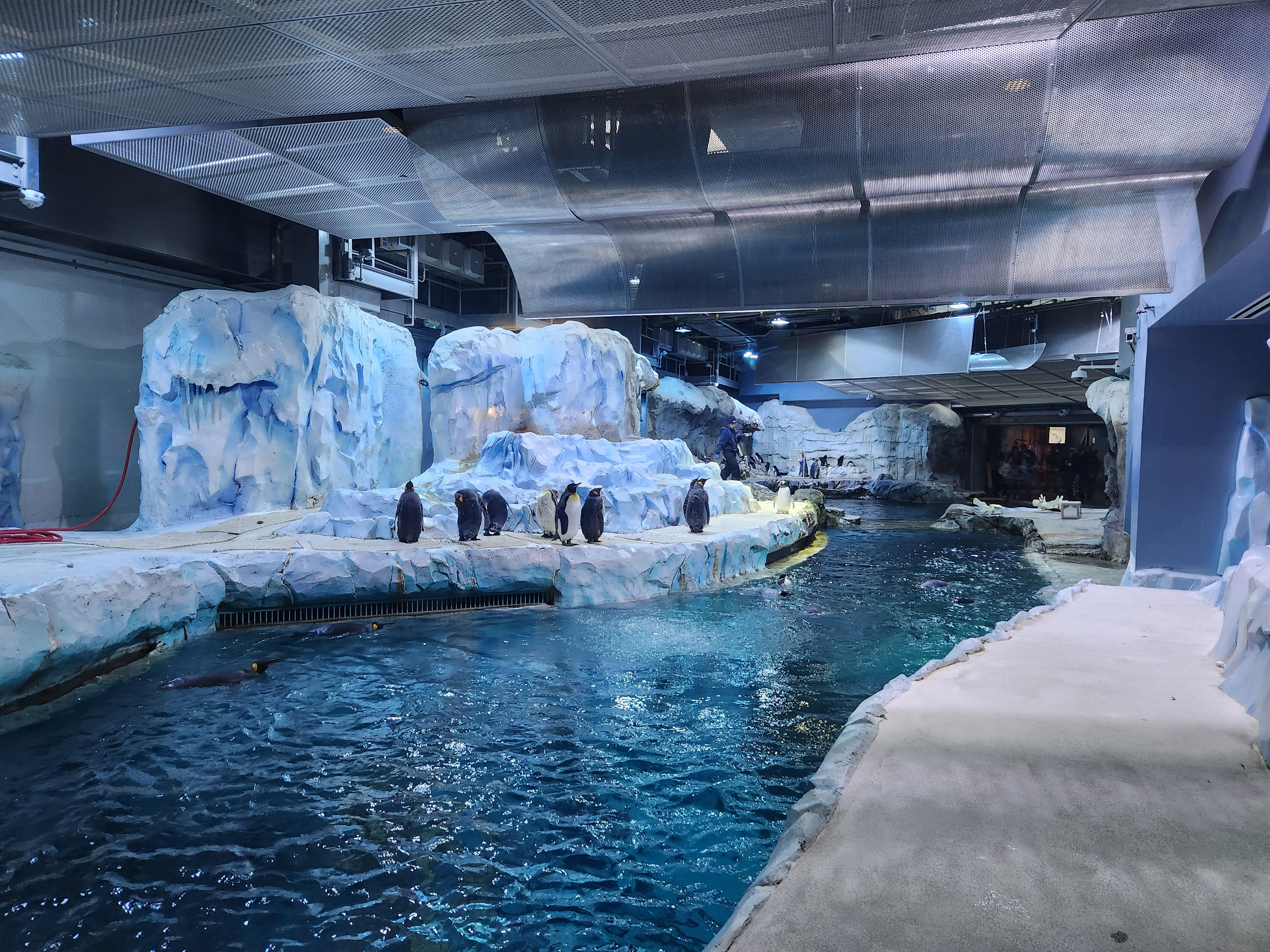
Penguin Center

Rhinoceros

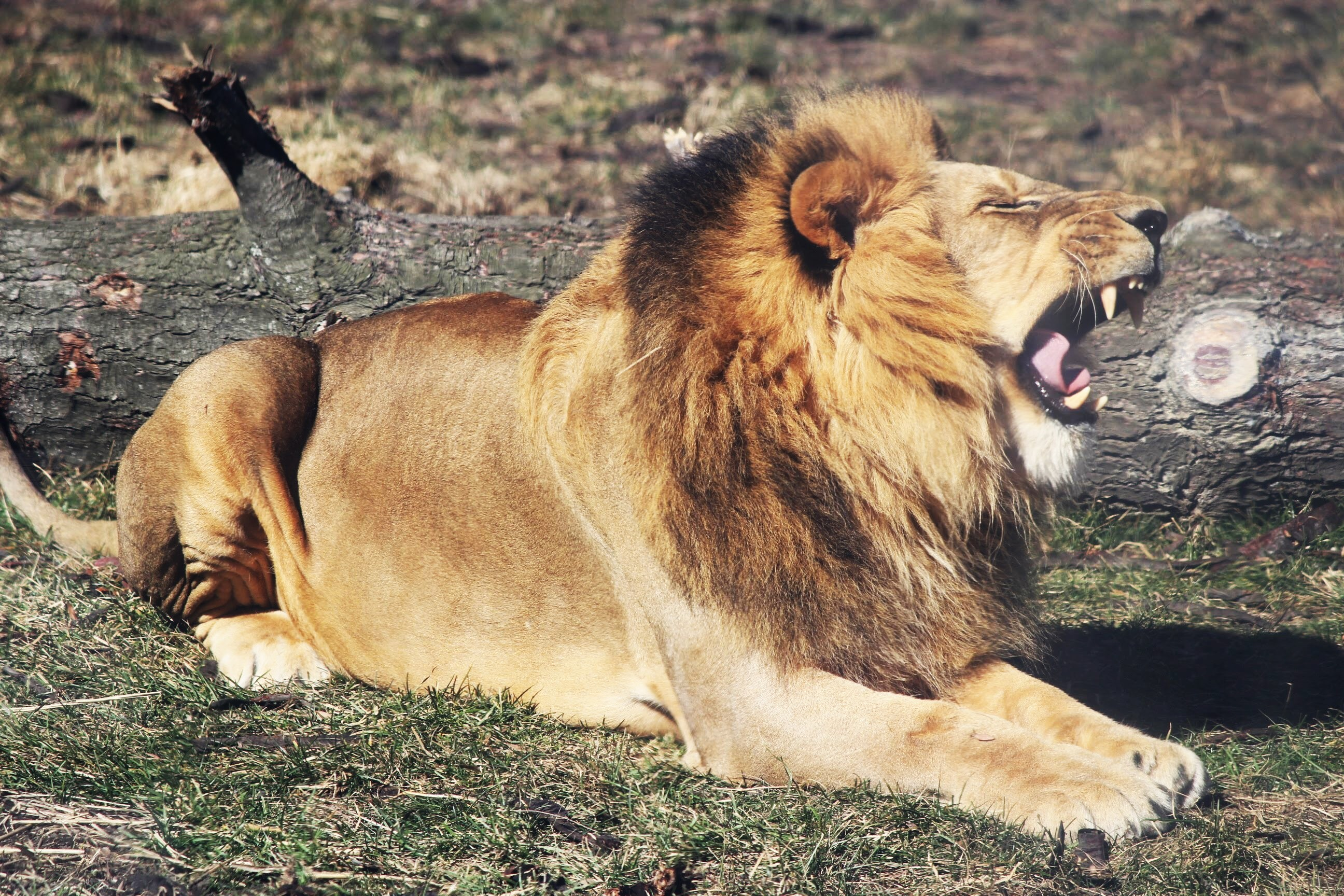
Lion roaring in the sun

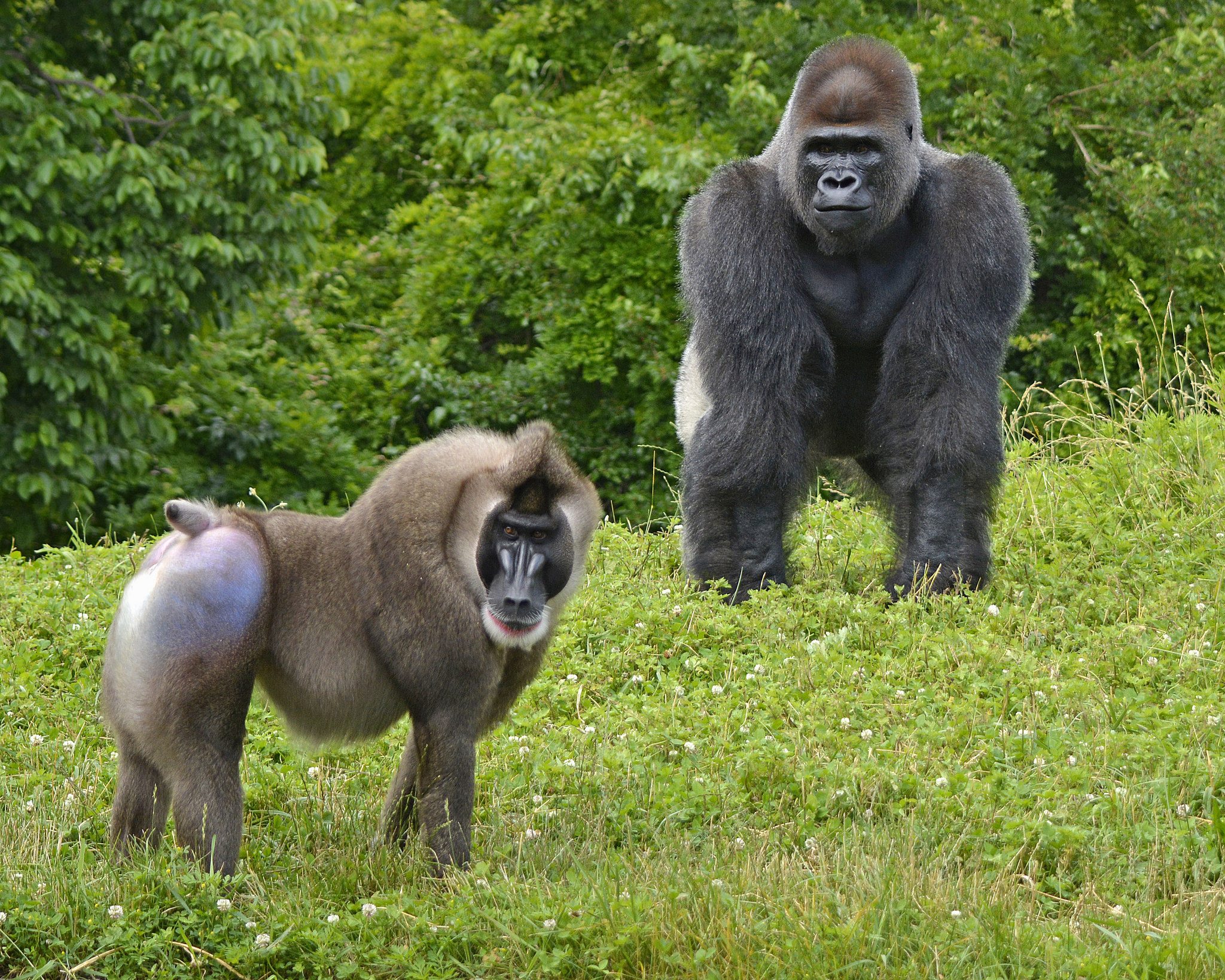
Mandrill and gorilla

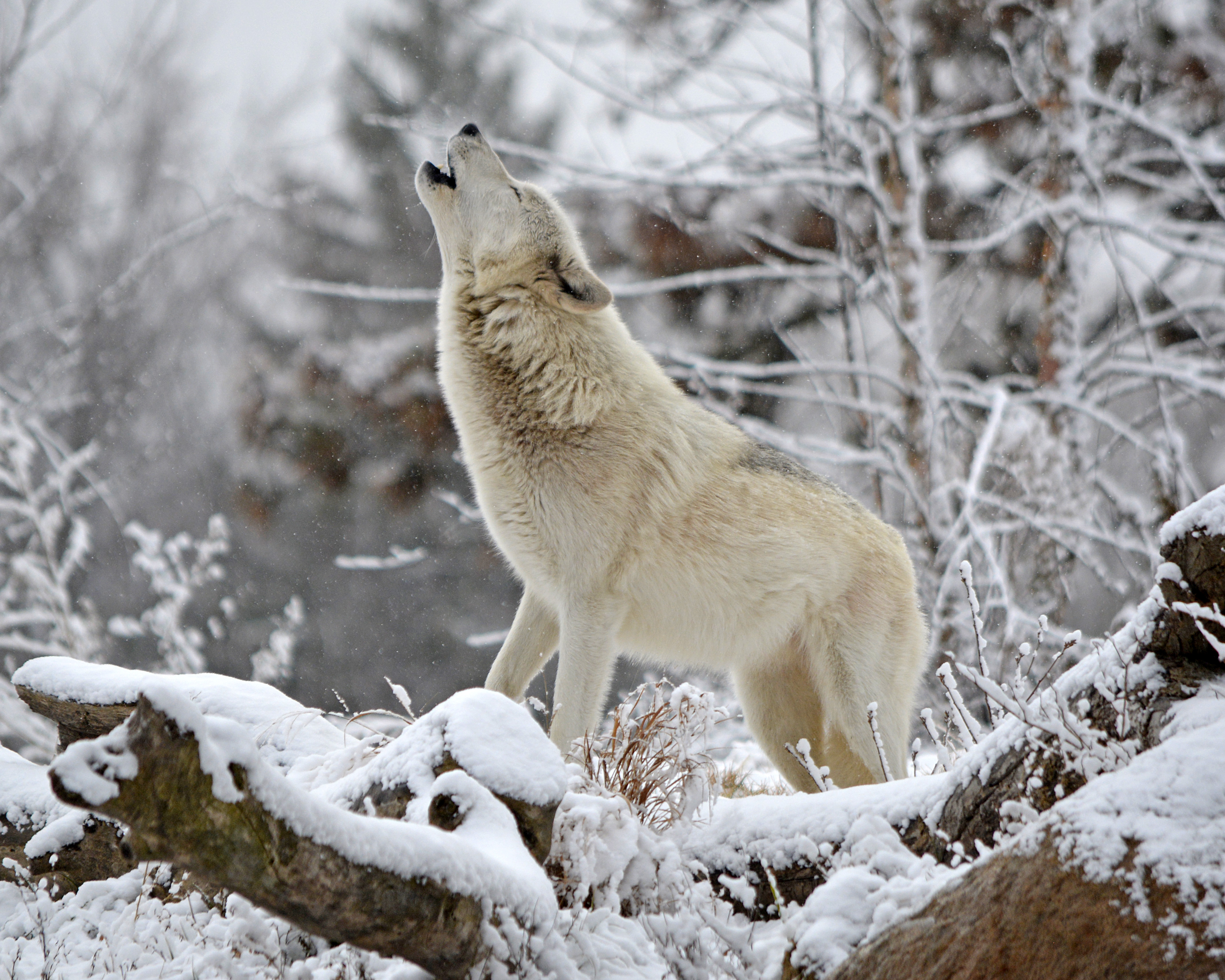
Wolf howling in winter at the Wolf Wilderness exhibit

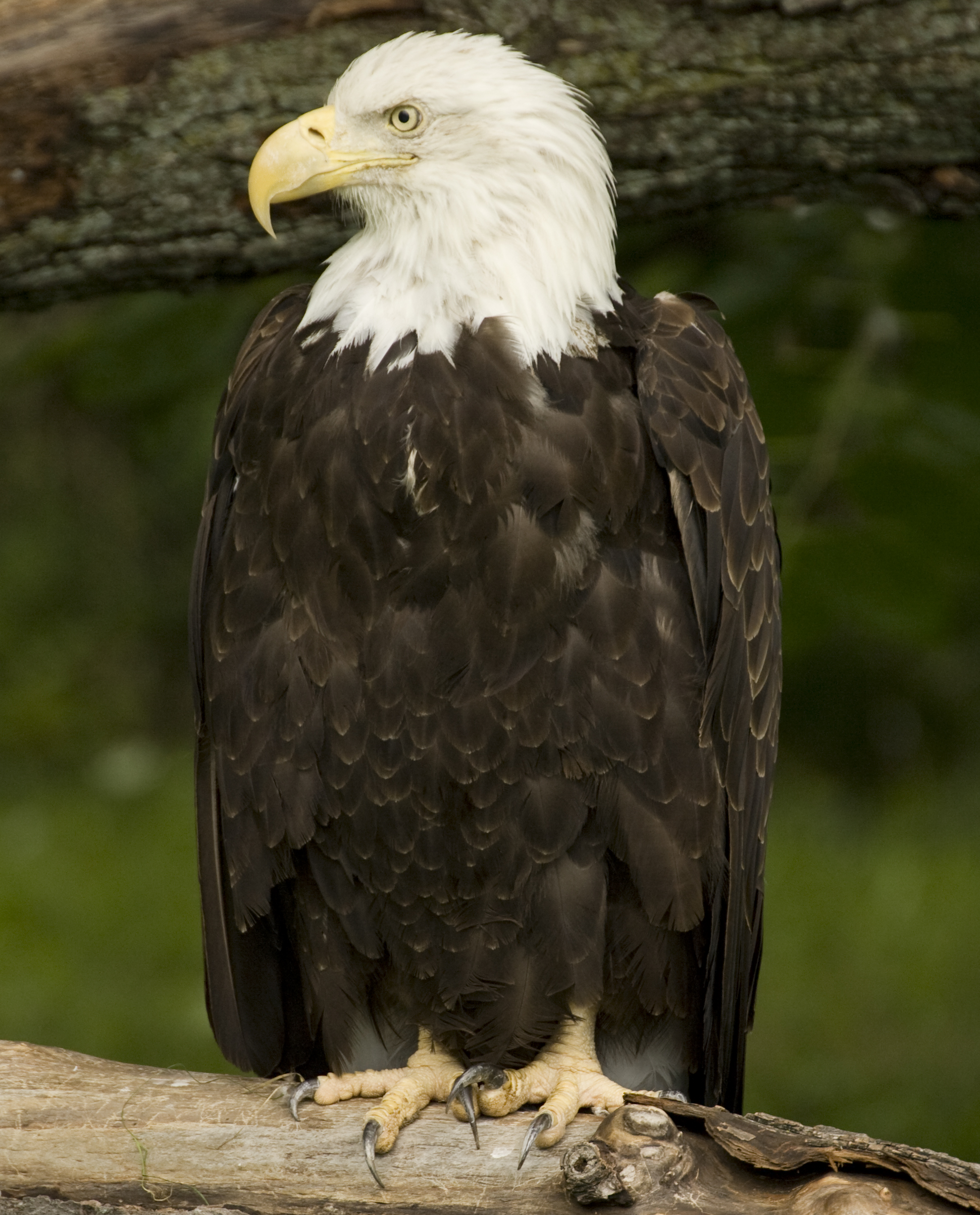
Bald eagle (Haliaeetus leucocephalus)

== See also ==
- National Register of Historic Places listings in Oakland County, Michigan
- Architecture of metropolitan Detroit
- Tourism in metropolitan Detroit

== References and further reading ==
- Austin, William (1974). The First Fifty Years. The Detroit Zoological Society.
- Detroit Zoological (2003). Wonders Among Us: Celebrating 75 Years of the Detroit Zoo. Detroit Zoological Society. ISBN 0-615-12410-0.
- Fisher, Dale (2003). Building Michigan: A Tribute to Michigan's Construction Industry. Grass Lake, MI: Eyry of the Eagle Publishing. ISBN 1-891143-24-7.
- Landry, Michael. (July/Aug. 2023). "Lions, Tigers, and Bears—Oh My! A History of the Detroit Zoo". Michigan History 107(4), pp. 19++. Lansing, Michigan: Historical Society of Michigan. Accessed via Gale OneFile
- Rodriguez, Michael and Thomas Featherstone (2003). Detroit's Belle Isle Island Park Gem (Images of America). Arcadia Publishing. ISBN 0-7385-2315-1.
- Kvaran, Einar Einarsson. Shadowing Parducci, unpublished manuscript, Detroit.
