= Huntington Woods, Michigan =

- City
- City of Huntington Woods
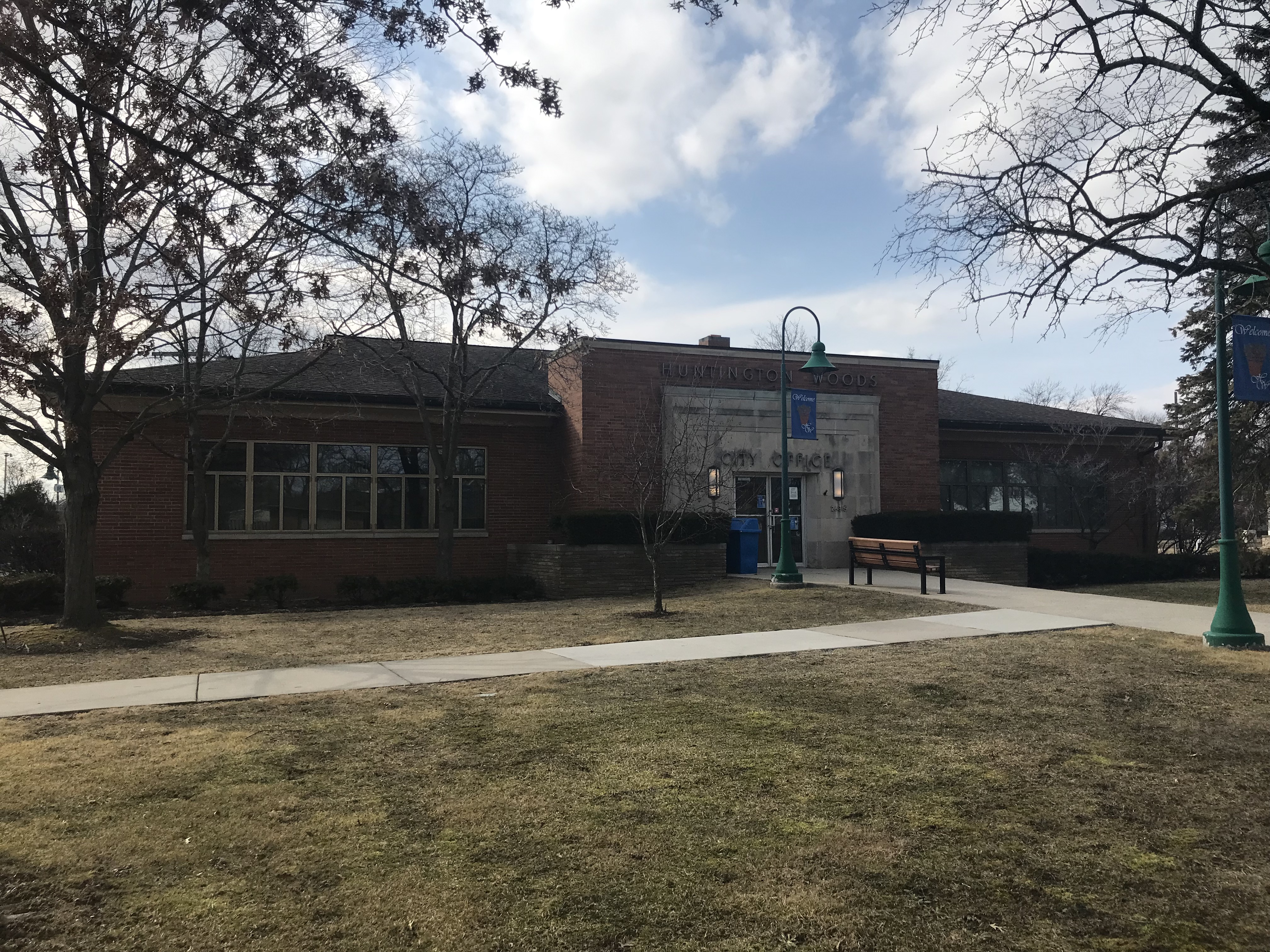
- Huntington Woods City Office

- Seal
- Nickname: The Woods
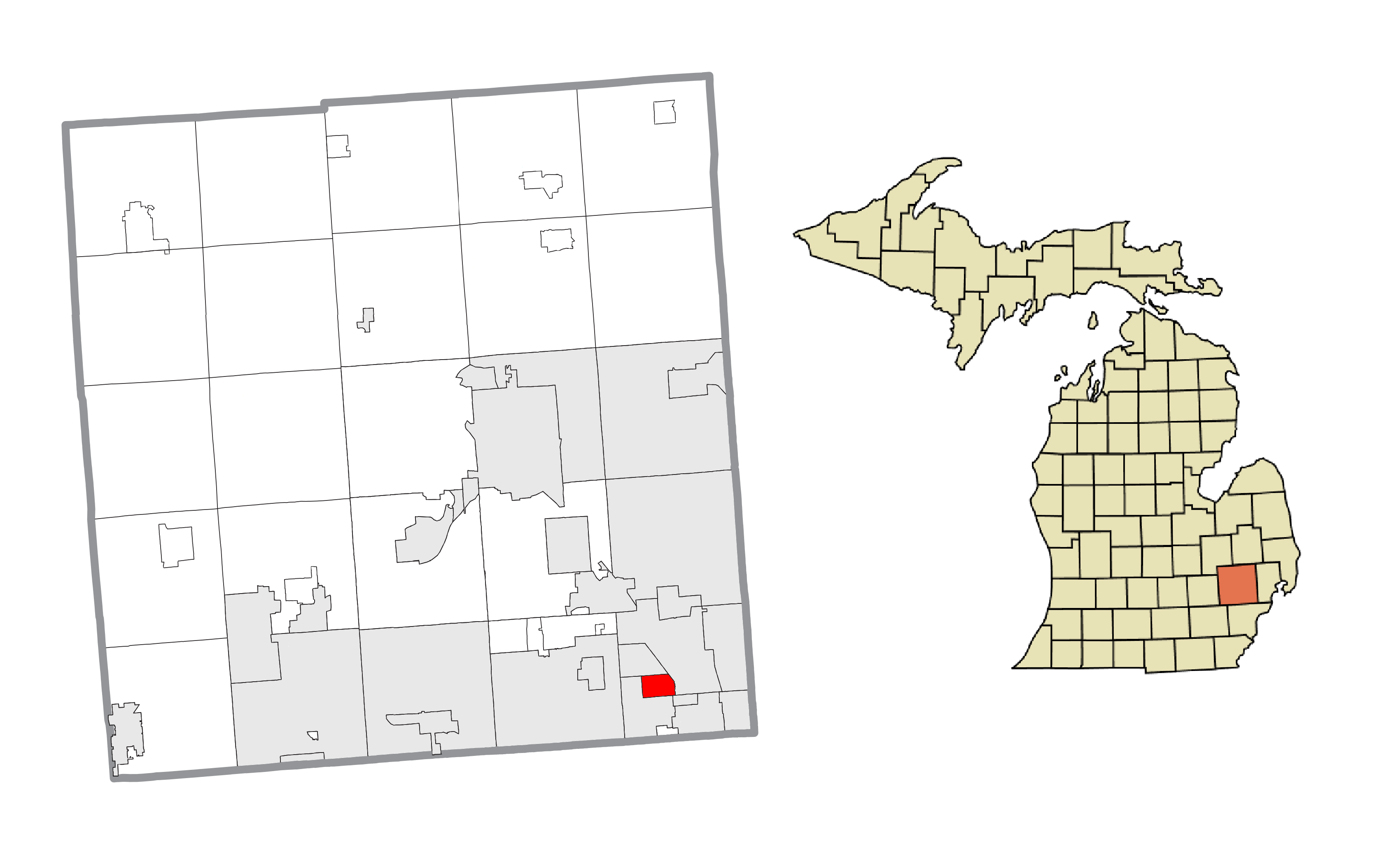
- Location within Oakland County

- Location within Michigan
- Coordinates: 42°28′50″N 83°10′01″W
- Country: United States
- State: Michigan
- County: Oakland
- Incorporated: 1926 (village); 1932 (city)

Government
  - Type: City commission
  - Mayor: Jordan White
  - Mayor pro tem: Jules Olsman

Area
  - City: 1.49 sq mi (3.86 km^{2})
  - Land: 1.49 sq mi (3.86 km^{2})
  - Water: 0 sq mi (0.00 km^{2})
- Elevation: 663 ft (202 m)

Population (2020)
  - City: 6,388
  - Density: 4,289.5/sq mi (1,656.18/km^{2})
  - Metro: 4,296,250 (Metro Detroit)
- Time zone: UTC-5 (EST)
  - Summer (DST): UTC-4 (EDT)
- ZIP code(s): 48070
- Area code: 248
- FIPS code: 26-40000
- GNIS feature ID: 0628842
- Website: Official website

Huntington Woods is a city in Oakland County in the U.S. state of Michigan. An inner-ring suburb of Detroit on the Woodward Corridor, Huntington Woods is located roughly 12 miles (19.3 km) northwest of downtown Detroit. As of the 2020 census, the city had a population of 6,388.

Huntington Woods is situated along the Woodward Corridor (M-1) and is bounded by Ten and Eleven Mile Roads to the north and south, and by Woodward and Coolidge Highway to the east and west. Rackham Golf Course is located in the central southern side of the city. The western portion of the Detroit Zoo is located within the city limits and is a contributor to its tax base.

== Geography ==
According to the United States Census Bureau, the city has a total area of 1.47 square miles (3.81 km^{2}), all land. Rackham Golf Course, owned by the city of Detroit, makes up 20% (0.3 square miles) of the total area of the city.

Huntington Woods is adjacent to the cities of Pleasant Ridge to the southeast, Oak Park to the south and west, Royal Oak to the east, and Berkley to the north.

Huntington Woods is bordered to the south by 10 Mile Road/I-696, to the west by Coolidge Highway, to the east by Woodward Avenue (M-1), and to the north by 11 Mile Road.

== Demographics ==
Historical population
Census	Pop.	Note	%±
1930	655		—
1940	1,705		160.3%
1950	4,949		190.3%
1960	8,746		76.7%
1970	8,536		−2.4%
1980	6,937		−18.7%
1990	6,419		−7.5%
2000	6,151		−4.2%
2010	6,238		1.4%
2020	6,388		2.4%
U.S. Decennial Census

Huntington Woods has the highest proportion of Jews of any municipality in Michigan. 65% of households in the 48070 zip code — which covers all of Huntington Woods and the small portion of the uninhabited Detroit Zoo in Royal Oak — identified as Jewish.

=== 2020 census ===
As of the 2020 census, Huntington Woods had a population of 6,388. The median age was 43.1 years. 25.6% of residents were under the age of 18 and 19.0% of residents were 65 years of age or older. For every 100 females there were 94.2 males, and for every 100 females age 18 and over there were 91.1 males age 18 and over.

100.0% of residents lived in urban areas.

There were 2,375 households in Huntington Woods, of which 39.2% had children under the age of 18 living in them. Of all households, 68.5% were married-couple households, 8.8% were households with a male householder and no spouse or partner present, and 18.8% were households with a female householder and no spouse or partner present. About 17.8% of all households were made up of individuals and 10.4% had someone living alone who was 65 years of age or older.

There were 2,428 housing units, of which 2.2% were vacant. The homeowner vacancy rate was 0.6% and the rental vacancy rate was 4.2%.

Racial composition as of the 2020 census
Race	Number	Percent
White	5,928	92.8%
Black or African American	45	0.7%
American Indian and Alaska Native	7	0.1%
Asian	75	1.2%
Native Hawaiian and Other Pacific Islander	0	0.0%
Some other race	46	0.7%
Two or more races	287	4.5%
Hispanic or Latino (of any race)	146	2.3%

=== 2010 census ===
As of the census of 2010, there were 6,238 people, 2,354 households, and 1,784 families living in the city. The population density was 4,243.5 inhabitants per square mile (1,638.4/km^{2}). There were 2,429 housing units at an average density of 1,652.4 per square mile (638.0/km^{2}). The racial makeup of the city was 96.0% White, 1.0% African American, 0.2% Native American, 1.3% Asian, 0.5% from other races, and 1.1% from two or more races. Hispanic or Latino of any race were 1.6% of the population.

There were 2,354 households, of which 38.0% had children under the age of 18 living with them, 66.9% were married couples living together, 6.4% had a female householder with no husband present, 2.5% had a male householder with no wife present, and 24.2% were non-families. 19.8% of all households were made up of individuals, and 9.1% had someone living alone who was 65 years of age or older. The average household size was 2.65 and the average family size was 3.08.

The median age in the city was 42 years. 27.4% of residents were under the age of 18; 3.8% were between the ages of 18 and 24; 23.6% were from 25 to 44; 31.6% were from 45 to 64; and 13.6% were 65 years of age or older. The gender makeup of the city was 49.2% male and 50.8% female.

=== 2000 census ===
As of the census of 2000, there were 6,151 people, 2,381 households, and 1,802 families living in the city. The population density was 4,196.0 inhabitants per square mile (1,620.1/km^{2}). There were 2,416 housing units at an average density of 1,648.1 per square mile (636.3/km^{2}). The racial makeup of the city was 96.96% White, 0.68% African American, 0.05% Native American, 1.41% Asian, 0.26% from other races, and 0.63% from two or more races. Hispanic or Latino of any race were 0.88% of the population.

There were 2,381 households, out of which 37.6% had children under the age of 18 living with them, 67.2% were married couples living together, 7.0% had a female householder with no husband present, and 24.3% were non-families. 19.5% of all households were made up of individuals, and 7.8% had someone living alone who was 65 years of age or older. The average household size was 2.58 and the average family size was 3.01.

In the city, the population was spread out, with 26.6% under the age of 18, 3.3% from 18 to 24, 27.8% from 25 to 44, 29.7% from 45 to 64, and 12.7% who were 65 years of age or older. The median age was 41 years. For every 100 females, there were 95.3 males. For every 100 females age 18 and over, there were 91.0 males.

The median income for a household in the city was $87,086, and the median income for a family was $97,055. Males had a median income of $73,750 versus $43,565 for females. The per capita income for the city was $45,264. About 1.8% of families and 2.6% of the population were below the poverty line, including 3.2% of those under age 18 and 2.3% of those age 65 or over.

== Education ==
All residents live within Berkley School District boundaries.

Many residents also attend local private schools, such as University of Detroit Jesuit High School, Detroit Country Day School, Shrine Catholic High School, The Roeper School, Farber Hebrew Day School, Hillel Day School, Cranbrook-Kingswood School, Brother Rice High School, and Mercy High School.

== Notable people ==
- Jordan Acker, lawyer and Democrat reagent of the University of Michigan
- Kristen Bell, actress
- Danny Fenster, American journalist formerly imprisoned in Myanmar on charges of incitement and sedition by that country's military junta
- Rachel Jacobs, social entrepreneur
- Angela Povilaitis, former assistant attorney general who led the prosecution of Larry Nassar
- Jef Mallett, artist and writer of the syndicated comic strip Frazz, current resident
- Ellen Lipton, American politician and former Democratic member of the Michigan State House of Representatives
- Ellen Sandweiss, actress
- Andy Levin, Former United States Congressman
- Sander Levin, Former United States Congressman, Residence for most of adult life, until moving to Royal Oak in 2000.
- Justin Wedes, community activist and social entrepreneur, co-founder of Occupy Wall Street
- Jan van der Marck, Dutch-born American museum administrator, curator, and art historian, he lived in Huntington Woods for more than 20 years.

== See also ==
- Woodward Corridor
