= Henry Burr Sherwood =

Henry Burr Sherwood (2 February 1829 – 27 October 1906) was an inventor, miller, and farmer in Westport, Connecticut.

He played a notable role in the 19th-century economy of the Westport area, including owning and operating the Compo Tide Mill (see Mill Cove Historic District). He invented a farming implement important for the local onion-growing economy of the Westport/Fairfield area and established in 1857 a 14-acre (57,000 m^{2}) onion farm on the west side of Sherwood Mill Pond at 180 Hillspoint Road in Westport.

== The Sherwood family of Westport ==
Henry Burr Sherwood was born in 1829 into the Sherwood family of Connecticut's Sherwood Island State Park fame. He was an eighth-generation Sherwood and a nephew of the Sherwood ship captain triplets, Francis, Franklin, and Frederick, famous for their roles running clipper ships in the China trade.

The Sherwood family originally settled in Fairfield County from Ipswich, England, in 1634. A descendant, Daniel (b. 1761), built a homestead on Sherwood Island, east of today's Sherwood Mill Pond, and married Catherine Burr. Their son, Daniel (b. 1794), was the father of Henry Burr Sherwood (b. 1829), and built the house currently standing at 160 Hillspoint Road.

Henry married Julie Guyer of Westport, the daughter of a neighboring farmer. They had two children, Etta M. (b. 1862) and Rollin G. (b. 1869).

== Compo Tide Mill ==
Henry Burr Sherwood owned and operated the Compo Tide Mill. In 1991, the Mill Cove, the area immediately surrounding the location of the Compo Tide Mill, was declared a National Historic District.

The Sherwood Mill Pond at Compo Cove is a large tidal pond that was significant to the settlement and historical development pattern of the local Westport / Compo / Greens Farms area. The tidal flow from Long Island Sound was a significant source of power in the 18th century, leading to the construction of one of the earliest grist mills in the area (rights granted ca. 1705 by the town of Fairfield). The tidal pond also hosted fertile and productive oyster beds. The original grist mill was built by John Cable, but by 1790 had been acquired and rebuilt by Sherwood family members to serve local farmers. Henry's father Daniel and uncle Ebenezer improved the mill by erecting a substantial breakwater, wharves, and sluice gates.

Henry Burr Sherwood acquired a 3/4 interest in the tide mill for $1,500 in 1853. In the following years, he acquired additional properties surrounding the mill pond: 2 acres (8,100 m^{2}) of salt meadows and 14 acres (57,000 m^{2}) on the west side of the mill pond.

The mill specialized in grinding kiln-dried corn meal for shipment to New York and to the West Indies. Coasting and packet vessels came into Compo Cove and loaded at the tide mill. The mill also had a cooperage for manufacturing the barrels used in shipping. The 1860 census showed Henry using skilled labor from England to help operate the mill.

Demand for milling of corn and other grains declined as the Westport farm economy began transitioning to onion farming just prior to the Civil War. Henry worked during the post-Civil War years to keep the mill running by importing, grinding, and shipping baryte, a mineral with a number of industrial uses. The Compo Tide Mill was destroyed by fire in 1895.

== Inventor and onion farmer ==
Onion farming began in the Westport area in the 1840s. Onions were a cash crop aided by the inexpensive transportation provided by Westport's location on the Saugatuck River and Long Island Sound. The Civil War drove increased demand for onions; pickled onions were used by the Union Army to reduce scurvy.

== Sources ==
- "The Sherwood Family", article by Edward C. Birge, The Westport-Herald, June 7, 1935
- Greens Farms Connecticut - The Old West Parish of Fairfield, George P. Jennings, Modern Books & Crafts, Greens Farms, CT, 1933
- Friends of Sherwood Island State Park website
