= Longshore Club Park =

Town-owned golf course and park in Westport, Connecticut

- Interactive map of Longshore Club Park
- 41°6′41″N 73°21′46″W

Club information
- Location: Westport, Connecticut, U.S.
- Established: 1929; 97 years ago
- Type: Public (municipal)
- Owner: Town of Westport
- Total holes: 18
- Designer: Orrin E. Smith
- Par: 69

Longshore Club Park is a town-owned park, golf course and marina on South Compo Road in Westport, Connecticut, on the shore of Long Island Sound at the mouth of the Saugatuck River. The property was the estate of Frederick E. Lewis before it was converted in 1929 into the private Longshore Beach and Country Club. In 1960 the Town of Westport bought the club for $1,925,000 and opened it to residents as a public park. Contemporary press described the purchase as a precedent that "made national headlines." The 169-acre park includes an 18-hole golf course, a marina, swimming pools, tennis courts, the Longshore Sailing School and the Inn at Longshore.

== History ==
=== The Lewis estate (before 1929) ===
In the 19th and early 20th centuries the land was farmed as Compo Farm, where the Cutting family of Brooklyn grew onions. It later became the waterfront estate of Frederick E. Lewis, known as Longshore. Lewis's main house survives in part as the Inn at Longshore. On June 30, 1917, Harry Houdini performed an underwater box escape from the estate's boathouse pier as part of a charity drive for the Red Cross and Allied war relief. In the mid-1920s the property operated as "Longshore Farms," and horses from the stable of Mrs. F. E. Lewis competed at the Fairfield County Hunt Club horse show in Greens Farms.

=== Founding (1929) ===
On June 5, 1929, incorporation papers were filed with the Secretary of the State of Connecticut for The Longshore Beach and Country Club, Inc., formed "to maintain and operate a pleasure resort." The same incorporators also formed the Longshore Estates Corporation to deal in real estate. Two days later Pat Powers, founder of Celebrity Productions which was the first distributor of Walt Disney's Mickey Mouse cartoons, of New York City had bought the 200-acre Lewis estate, with a mile and a half of waterfront, for an exclusive beach and country club. Plans called for a large clubhouse, a yacht basin with a channel 10 feet (3.0 m) deep at low tide, and a golf course then under construction. Membership was to be "highly restricted," and promoters billed the club as the "Southampton of Connecticut."

The club opened on June 29, 1929. Its opening advertisement offered a sandy beach with cabanas, a granite pier and yacht basin on Saugatuck Harbor, tennis, and a redecorated clubhouse with an enlarged dining room and sleeping rooms. It also noted that "a nine hole golf course is being constructed." Annual dues were $100. The course was laid out by Orrin E. Smith, who had begun his career as a construction superintendent for Willie Park Jr.

=== Private club era (1930–1959) ===
In 1930 the Metropolitan Archery Association chose the club for its annual tournament, the first time the event was held in Connecticut. In October 1935, the club's manager was among 13 people arrested when state troopers seized slot machines and pinball machines from more than 40 businesses between Westport and Norwalk.

In March 1938, Powers, described by Time as a onetime backer of Walt Disney, proposed building a $100,000 "marine stadium" in Westport and leasing it for $1 a year to a society of music patrons, with the aim of making the town an American Salzburg. Residents protested at Town Hall, and the Board of Zoning Appeals refused Powers a permit to continue construction.

On June 27, 1942, Wendell Willkie opened the Connecticut Republican state campaign at the club. In June 1946, Babe Ruth spent a week in Westport as the guest of Dr. Vito Caselnova, chairman of the club's golf committee. Playing with club professional George Buck, Ruth shot a 79 that included a 35-foot eagle putt on the 12th hole. By 1947 the club was run by Julius Baller, who announced dinner dances and fall golf, and Buck sought to bring amateur Frank Stranahan for an exhibition.

=== Town purchase (1959–1960) ===
In 1959, rumors spread that the club, which was not attracting enough members, would be sold to a developer and divided into two-acre house lots. After the Westport Town Crier urged the town to consider buying it in a September 10 editorial, First Selectman Herbert E. Baldwin appointed a Recreational Resources Committee chaired by Julian Brodie.

At the end of January 1960, the town obtained an option to buy the club for $1,925,000 from Julius Baller, president of the Grey's Creek Development Corporation, which owned the property. Baller had earlier denied that the club was for sale. On February 3, the Board of Finance approved a $1,925,000 bond issue, with the backing of the Recreation Commission, the Planning and Zoning Commission and the local Board of Realtors. On February 10, before a crowd of more than 400 at Kings Highway School, the Representative Town Meeting voted unanimously to buy the club. Some residents objected to the speed of the decision, but Brodie said the owners would not extend the option because they had higher offers.

Two days later, residents began circulating a petition to force a referendum on the bond issue, saying they did not oppose the purchase but wanted the whole electorate to vote. The petitioners withdrew after officials explained that each stage of the park's development would require public approval and that the land could be resold if necessary. No referendum was held. The town then sought bids on a $3,185,000 bond issue that combined the Longshore purchase with sewer construction. Officials said user fees would cover operating costs but not the roughly $150,000 a year in bond payments. Longshore Club Park opened to residents on May 28, 1960.

=== Longshore Club Park (1960–present) ===
The Longshore Women's Golf Association was founded the year the town bought the club. By 1965 the park had a beach, swimming pools, a marina for about 125 boats, the golf course, tennis courts, and a clubhouse with a ballroom, restaurants, cottages and hotel rooms. A Bridgeport Sunday Post survey that year found most users approved of town ownership but complained of crowding at peak times.

The clubhouse later fell into disrepair. In 1978 it was relaunched as the Inn at Longshore, with a ballroom for 450 guests. In 2007 the town signed a new ten-year lease for the inn with Longshore Associates of Westport, with annual rent rising from $325,000 to $675,000 by 2009. A restaurant, Pearl at Longshore, opened in the inn under a 2015 sublease. The inn reopened on August 8, 2026, after an $8 million renovation, its first in more than 40 years, under operator Delamar.

In 2023 the town adopted the Longshore Capital Improvement Plan, prepared with Stantec, to guide upgrades to the park over the following decade. The location of a proposed new golf clubhouse became the plan's most debated element.

== Golf course ==
The course is a short par-69 layout bordering Long Island Sound, with small, well-bunkered greens. Its original architect, Orrin E. Smith (1883–1958), was a Southington native who later designed a nine-hole layout at nearby Birchwood Country Club in 1946. A $2.3 million renovation, designed by A. John Harvey with The RBA Group, was completed in 2007.

George Buck, the club's professional since the 1940s, stayed on as head professional after the town purchase and served until his death in 1991. The women's association's George Buck Tournament, first held in 1962, is named for him. He was succeeded by John Cooper, who served for about 25 years until 2016, and then by Jon Janik, the course's third head professional under town ownership.
