= Old Hill (disambiguation) =

Old Hill is a location in the metropolitan borough of Sandwell in the West Midlands, England.

Old Hill is also the name of the following:

== Places in the United States ==
- Old Hill, Connecticut, a census-designated place
- Old Hill, Springfield, Massachusetts, a neighborhood of Springfield

== Other uses ==
- Old Hill Cricket Club, a cricket club in Cradley Heath, West Midlands, England
- Old Hill Wanderers F.C., a 19th-century association football club based in Old Hill, West Midlands
- Old Hill railway station, Old Hill, West Midlands
