= Sherwood Island State Park =

State park in Connecticut, United States

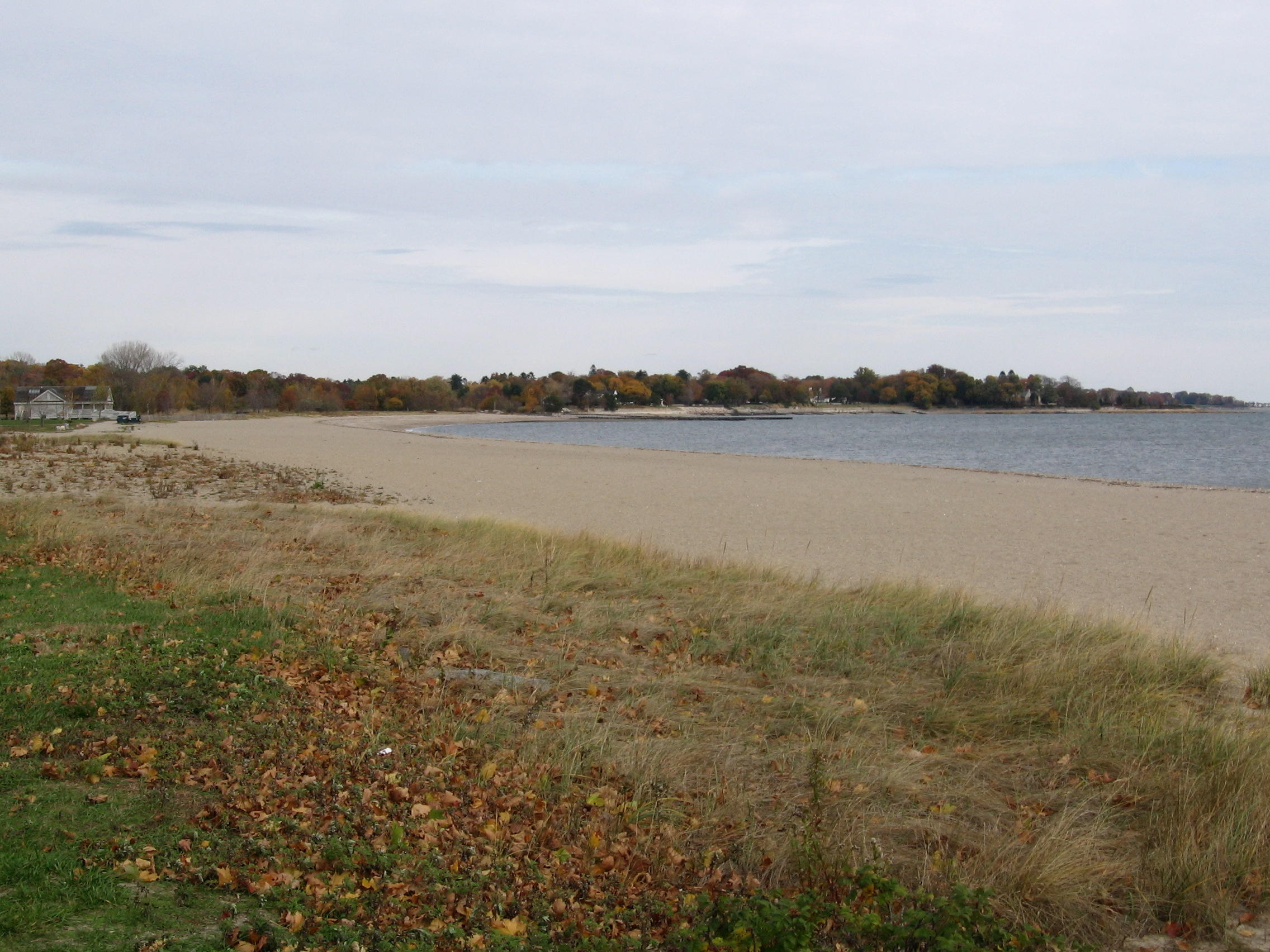
- East Beach at Sherwood Island State Park

- Location within Connecticut Location within the United States
- Location: Westport, Connecticut, United States
- Coordinates: 41°06′53″N 73°19′51″W
- Area: 238 acres (96 ha)
- Elevation: 16 feet (4.9 m)
- Established: 1914
- Administrator: Connecticut Department of Energy and Environmental Protection
- Designation: Connecticut state park
- Website: Official website

Sherwood Island State Park is a public recreation area on the shore of Long Island Sound in the Greens Farms section of Westport, Connecticut. The state park offers swimming, fishing, and other activities on 238 acres (96 ha) of beach, wetlands, and woodlands. Sherwood Island is numbered as Connecticut's first state park because state purchase of land at the site began in 1914. The park is managed by the Connecticut Department of Energy and Environmental Protection.

== History ==
In the 1640s, several colonists from the Town of Fairfield, who came to be known as the "Bankside Farmers," settled in the area that included Fox Island, which was later renamed Sherwood Island, administering the island in common.

Daniel Sherwood settled on Fox Island in 1787. During the 1800s, his large family farmed the uplands on the west side of the island and operated a gristmill on the Mill Pond. Many farmers shared the Machamux salt marsh. (See also Henry Burr Sherwood.) By the 1860s, the place was known as "Sherwood's Island." Gallup Gap Creek at one time ran north and south on the east side of the park but not far from the center. Some have said that what was known previously as Sherwood's Island was only west of that creek, which was later dammed up to help water flow at the grist mill.

When the Connecticut State Park Commission was formed in 1911, one of its main tasks was to find and develop shore parks along Connecticut's coastline. Field secretary Albert Turner walked the shoreline seeking suitable sites: several hundred acres of undeveloped land with natural scenic beauty, fronting on a good beach, and far enough from cities to ensure freedom from sewage pollution and lack of interference with industrial development. He concluded that Sherwood Island was the only suitable site in Fairfield County.

At that time, the land had many owners. Acting for the state, Westport farmer and public citizen William H. Burr Jr., who led the fight to create the park, bought two small parcels in 1914, including a 5-acre (20,000 m^{2}) strip of beachfront, giving Sherwood Island its designation as Connecticut’s first state park, although it took another two decades for the park to be widely used. Various parcels bought by 1915 amounted to 24 acres (97,000 m^{2}) by deed, although a state survey showed they in fact amounted to 30 acres (120,000 m^{2}). The park at this point had 23,350 feet (7,120 m) of shorefront.

In 1923, another 18 acres (73,000 m^{2}) north of the island were acquired for possible use as a parking lot, although they were unconnected to the other 30 acres (120,000 m^{2}). Some access to the park at this time was available through the Town of Westport's Burying Hill Beach. At this point, further development of the park stalled when local landowners, led by local property owner Edward Gair, persuaded a town meeting to oppose further land acquisitions and spending on the park. The state legislature, reluctant to act without local approval, defeated a proposal from the State Parks Commission to spend $500,000 on further park development. Large beachfront properties were acquired by developers. For the next nine years, supporters and opponents in Westport and Fairfield County debated the matter. By 1932, the state leased more land in what became the park (with an option to buy within five years) and opened the park that summer.

On April 29, 1937, with the lease and option to buy nearing expiration, Governor Wilbur L. Cross signed two bills with a total appropriation of $485,000 for the state to buy more land and develop the park. This was a victory for the Connecticut Forestry Association, the Fairfield County Planning Association, and supporters, including William H. Burr, who came to be known as the father of the park.

In the 1950s, the U.S. Army Corps of Engineers constructed jetties and extended the two beaches. In 1959, the state built an art deco styled pavilion/bathhouse. In 2002, a memorial was dedicated to the victims of the September 11, 2001 attacks.

== Features ==
Geography and geology

The park is bounded on the west by the Sherwood Mill Pond and on the south by Long Island Sound. It is separated from the mainland by creeks and ditches. The park's beaches are 6,000 feet (1,800 m) long, more than a mile. Waves on the beach separate three different colors of sand into separate lines — red (garnet), black (magnetite) and white (quartz) are sorted by the waves because each type has a different density and shape.

September 11 Memorial

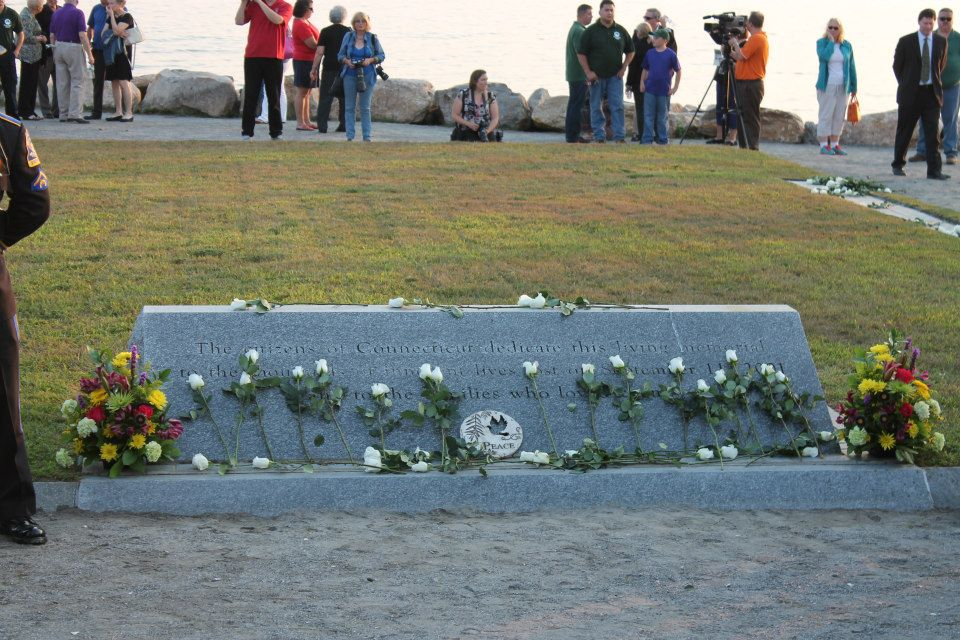
9-11 Memorial at Sherwood Island (pictured during the memorial services on the 2013 anniversary of the attacks)

Sherwood Island State Park was chosen for Connecticut's September 11 Living Memorial because on a clear day, the New York City skyline is visible from the point. On 9/11, people at the park witnessed the smoke rise over the World Trade Center. The park was authorized, though not activated, to be a staging area for relief efforts. At the dedication on September 5, 2002, the names of 149 deceased victims of the attacks were read aloud; each person was a resident of Connecticut or had close family in the state. Governor John G. Rowland presided over the interfaith ceremony of music, speech, and prayer. The memorial's design incorporates the endurance of granite, the sheltering beauty of trees, and the tranquility of the sea. The 9-foot (2.7 m) polished granite stone monument reads, "The citizens of Connecticut dedicate this living memorial to the thousands of innocent lives lost on September 11, 2001 and to the families who loved them." The memorial is handicapped-accessible.

Nature center

The Sherwood Island Nature Center is a summer facility that offers close-up experiences with live animals, displays about the environment and local history, and educational programs. The first nature center was set up by Park Supervisor Glenn Dochtermann in an unused first-aid and lifeguard building in the 1990s. Dochterman used the site as a meeting place for guided field trips and furnished the building with local specimens. In 1995, the Friends of Sherwood Island supported the nature center and established a summer internship program. In 2002, the building was deemed structurally unsound and a campaign to construct a new nature center was launched. The total cost of $340,000 for the new building came from $196,000 from the Connecticut Department of Environmental Protection and $144,000 from the Friends of Sherwood Island. The new facility was constructed and opened in 2009.

Access

The park is accessed from Exit 18 on Interstate 95 and proceeding south onto the Sherwood Island Connector, also known as Connecticut Special Service Road 476, before reaching the park's paved and gravel parking areas.

== Activities and amenities ==
Park activities include saltwater swimming and fishing, picnicking, scuba diving, field sports, bird watching, flying kites and model airplanes, and visiting the nature center. Facilities include a pavilion, bathhouses, concessions, a first aid station, toilets, and drinking fountains.

== Gallery ==
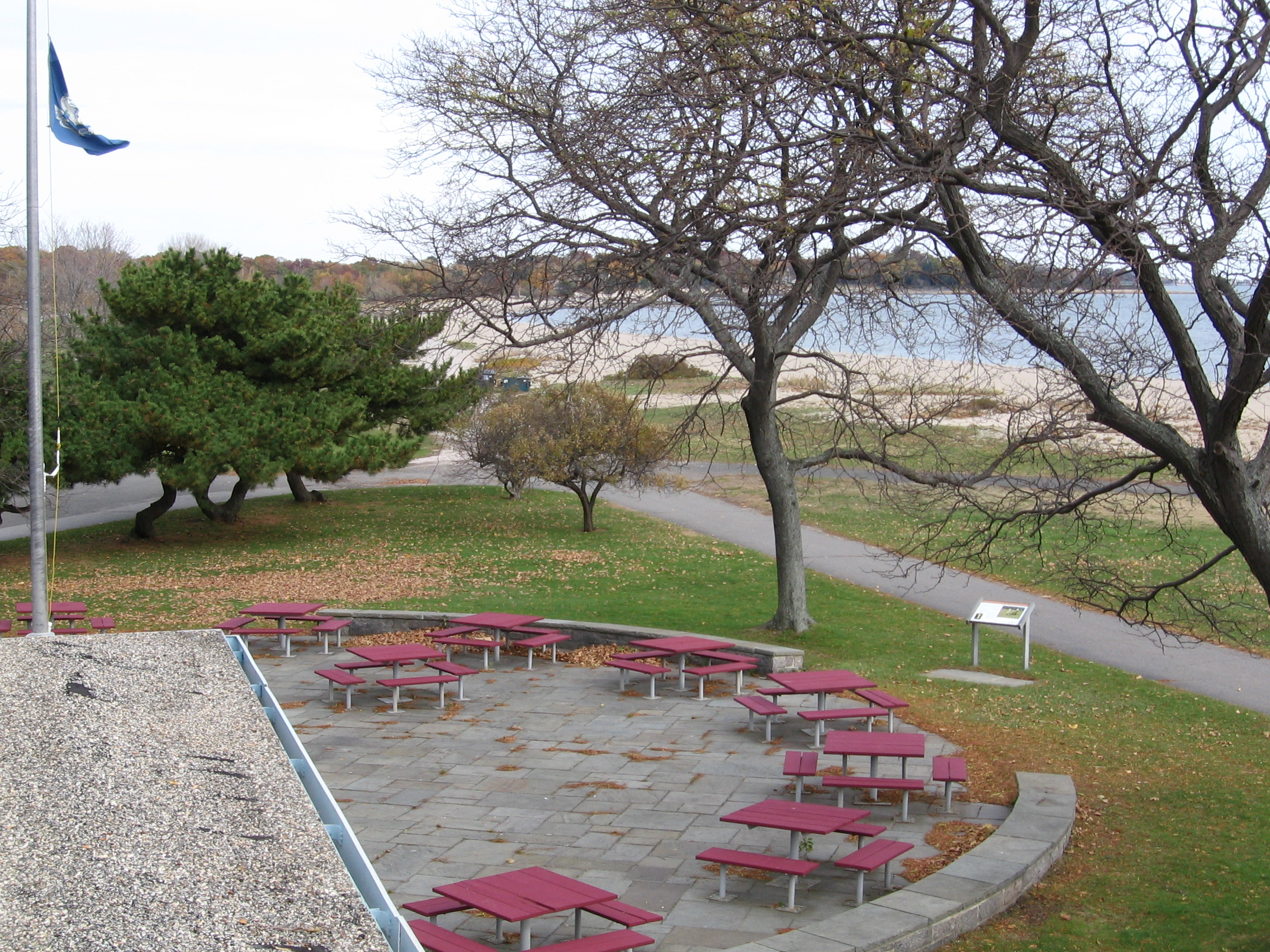
East from the pavilion roof

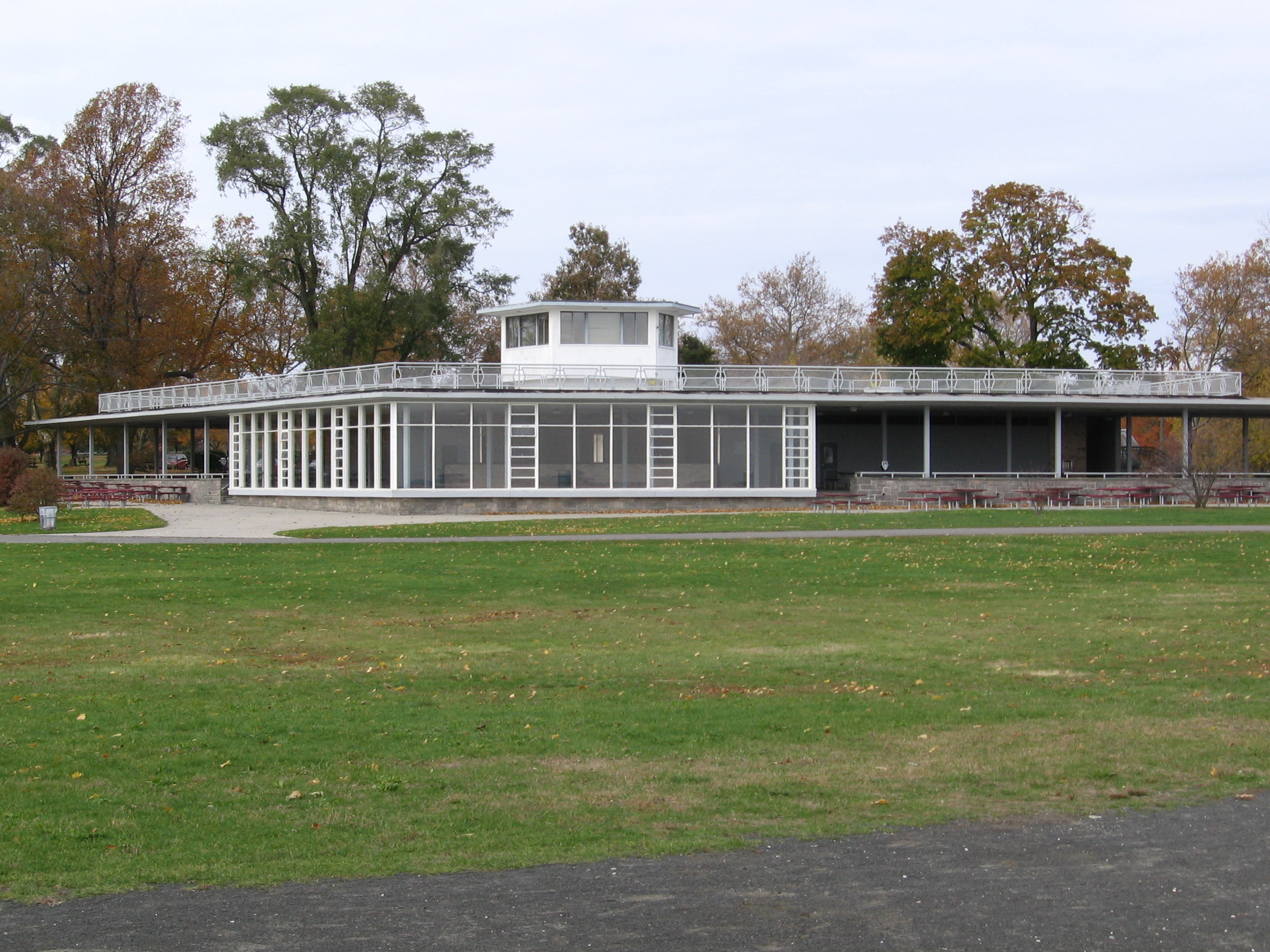
Pavilion, from the south

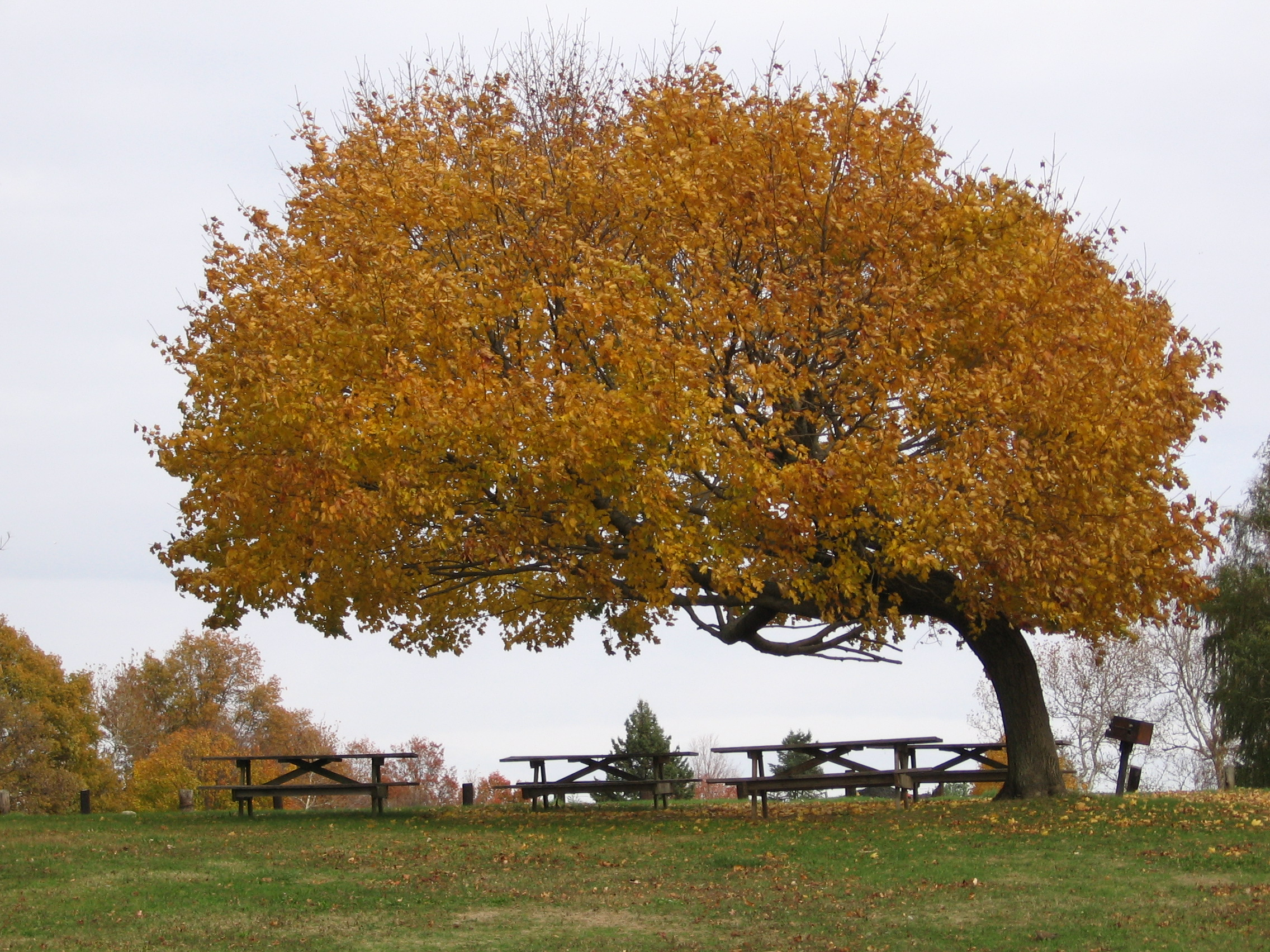
Distinctive picnic spot, west side

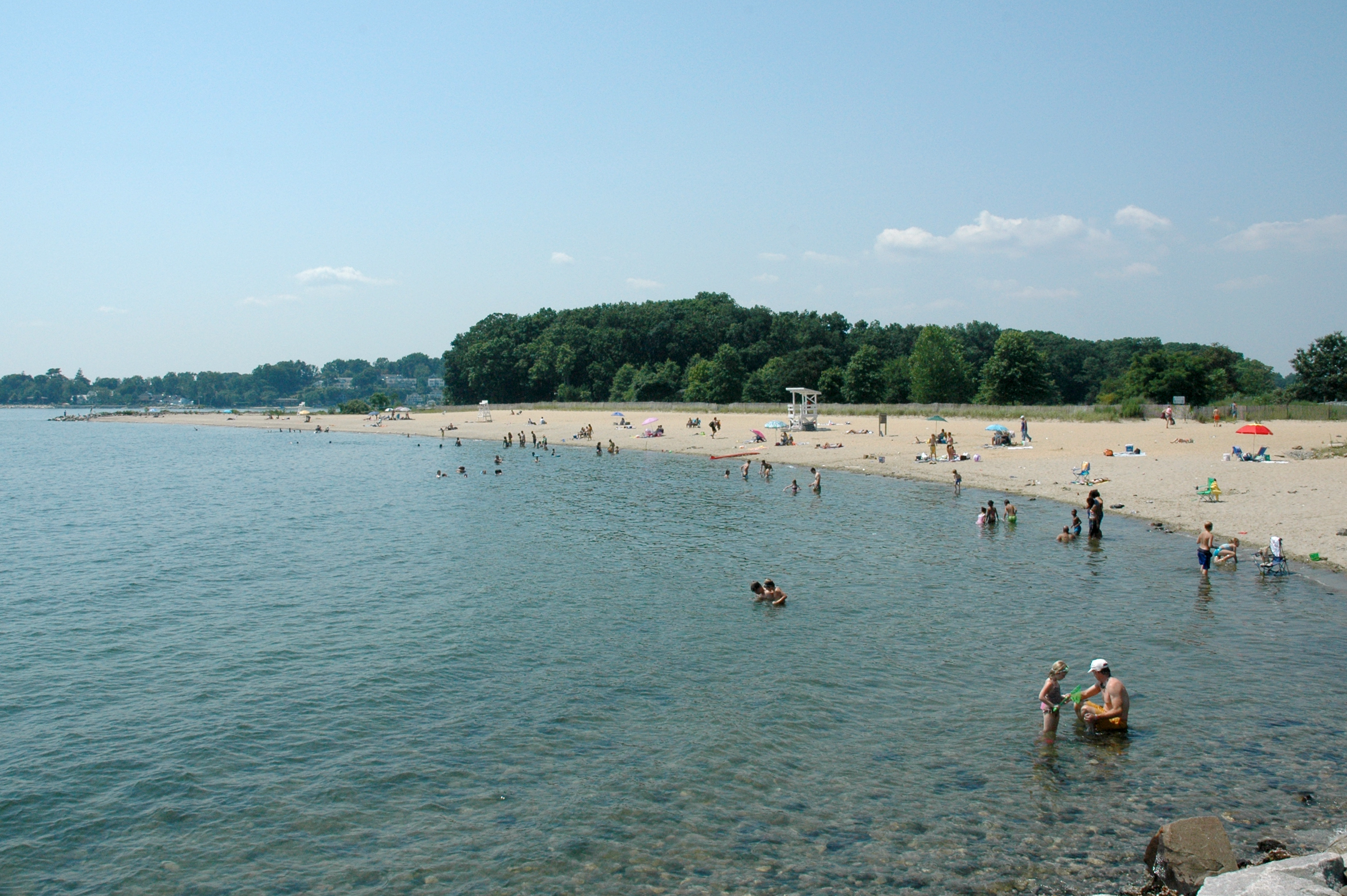
West beach in summer

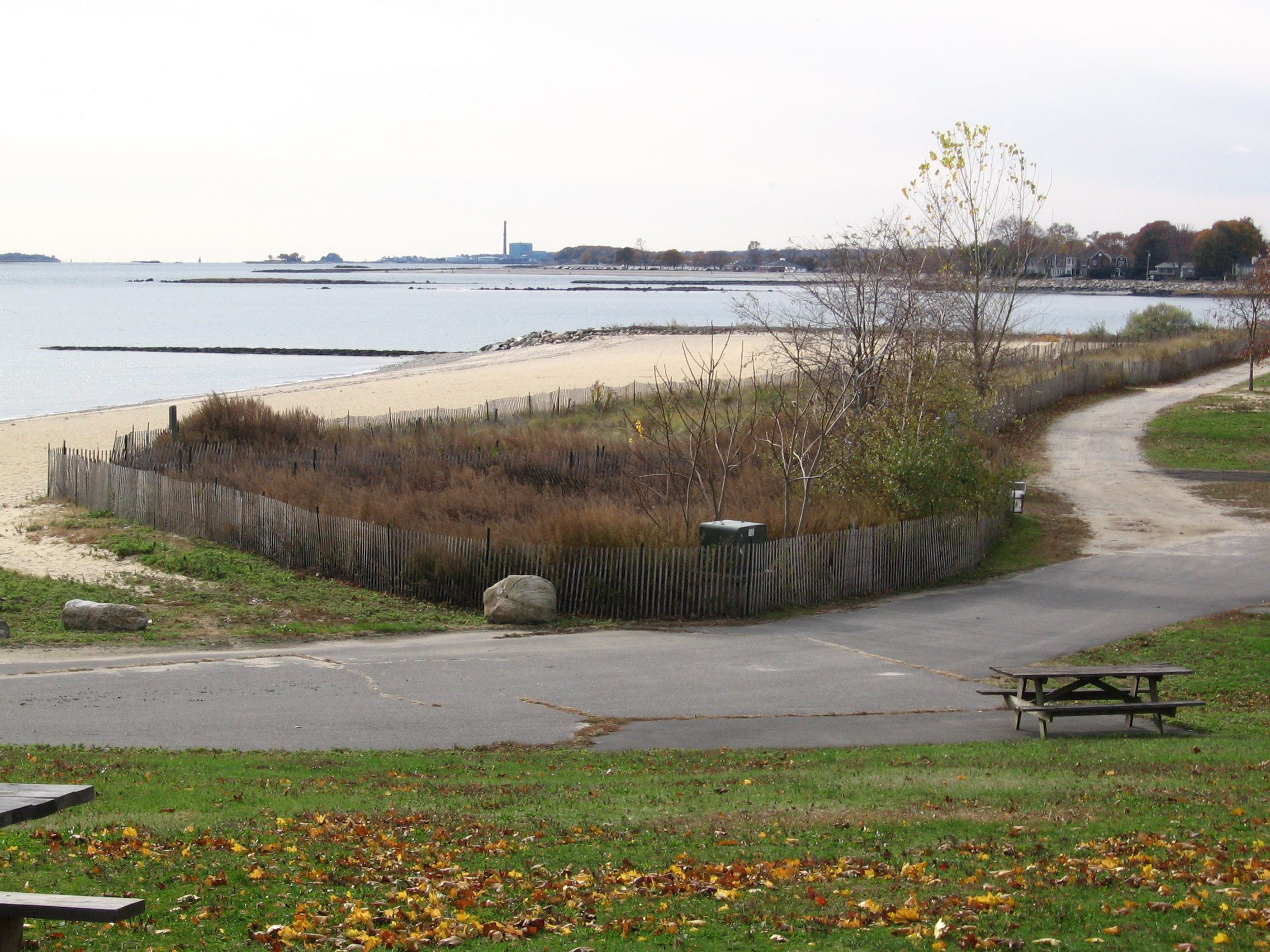
Beach on west side and "Protected Sand Dune Area"

== Additional sources ==
- Greens Farms, Connecticut: The Old West Parish of Fairfield, George Penfield Jennings, The Congregational Society of Greens Farms, 1933; reprinted: Modern Books & Crafts, 1971.
- The William H. Burr Jr. Collection (B-112), Fairfield Historical Society, Fairfield, Connecticut.
