= Compo–Owenoke Historic District =

Historic district in Connecticut, United States

- U.S. National Register of Historic Places
- U.S. Historic district
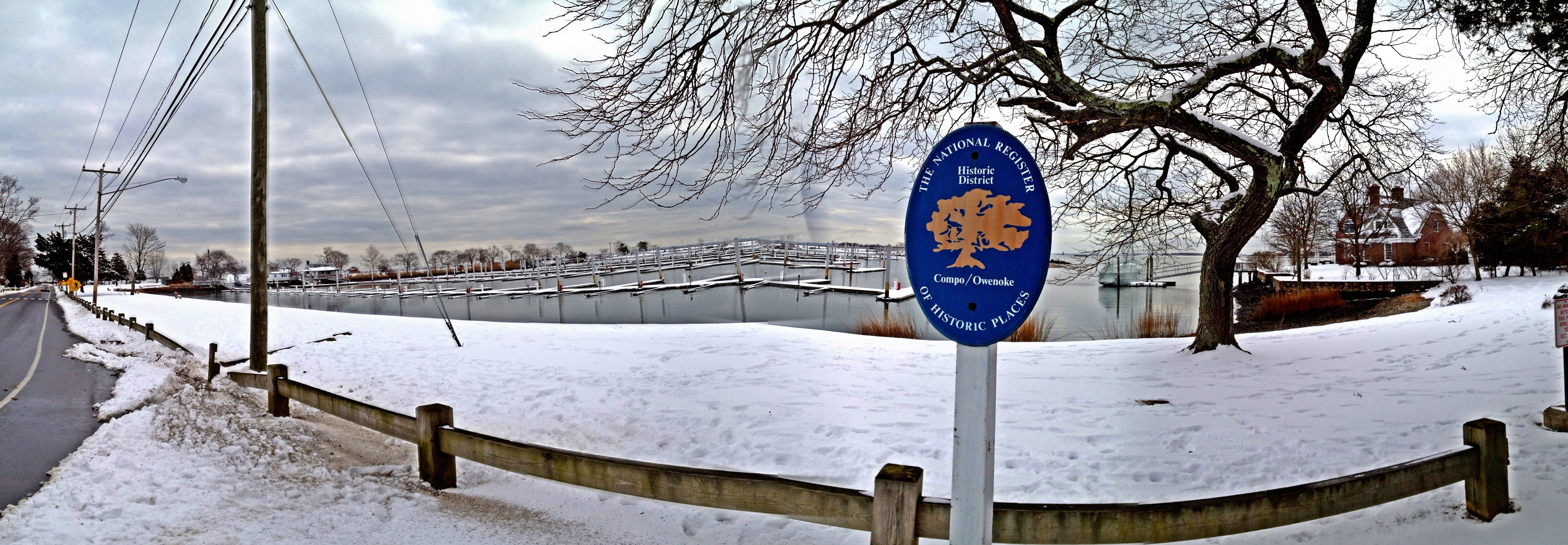

- Location within Connecticut Location within the United States
- Location: Roughly bounded by Gray's Creek, Compo Road South and Long Island Sound, Westport, Connecticut
- Coordinates: 41°6′22″N 73°21′18″W
- Area: 154 acres (62 ha)
- Architect: Sanford Evans; Ernest G. Southey
- Architectural style: Colonial Revival, Bungalow/Craftsman, Queen Anne
- MPS: Westport MPS
- NRHP reference No.: 91000393
- Added to NRHP: April 19, 1991

The Compo–Owenoke Historic District encompasses an early 20th-century summer resort beach community in Westport, Connecticut. Developed between 1910 and 1940, the Compo Beach area contains one of the largest assemblages of period resort architecture in Westport, and one of the best such collections in the region. The district, covering 154 acres (62 ha) south of Compo Road South, was listed on the National Register of Historic Places in 1991.

== Description and history ==
Compo and Owenoke occupy the southern portion of a peninsula extending into Long Island Sound south of downtown Westport. It is bounded on the east by Compo Cove, and the west by Gray's Creek. The historic district covers most of the area south of Compo Road South, excluding mainly buildings constructed or significantly altered after 1940. The Compo area is located north of Compo Beach, and has a somewhat grid-like road layout with mostly small lot sizes. The Owenoke Point peninsula projects westward from Compo; part of it was originally an island joined to the mainland by landfill in the 1930s. Buildings in the district are mainly Colonial Revival, Tudor Revival, or Craftsman/Bungalow in style. A few 19th-century farmhouses also remain in the district, a reminder of its agrarian past.

Prior to its development as a summer resort community, Compo was a coastal agricultural area. In 1909, development began on the eastern third of the district, formerly the farm of David Bradley. Roads on the western side of the district were laid out in 1919, and Appletree Trail was laid through the center of the district in 1928. The beach area was developed with bathing facilities, dancing pavilions, and a marina, but deed restrictions on most properties precluded the construction of hotels. The area was popular with middle-class New Yorkers in the 1920s.

== See also ==
- Mill Cove Historic District, another NRHP-listed historic district of cottages nearby
- National Register of Historic Places listings in Fairfield County, Connecticut
