= Greens Farms Academy =

School in Greens Farms, Connecticut, US

- GFA
- Greens Farms, Connecticut 06880; United States

Information
- Type: Private Preparatory Coeducational Secondary
- Established: 1925 (101 years ago)
- CEEB code: 070915
- Grades: PreK–12
- Gender: Co-educational
- Mascot: Dragons
- Nickname: "GFA"
- Website: gfacademy.org

Greens Farms Academy (GFA) is a preK-12 independent preparatory co-educational day school in the Greens Farms section of Westport, Connecticut, drawing students from numerous towns across Fairfield County. Green Farms Academy's mission and classes consist of real-world learning, smaller class sizes, as well as strong community built between students and teachers. Greens Farms Academy is located on a 42-acre campus overlooking the Long Island Sound, a salt marsh and an Audubon woodland.

== History ==
Founded in 1925 as The Bolton School by Mary E.E. Bolton and her sister, Katherine Laycock, the school's main purpose was to educate Bolton's two daughters. At the end of the first year, there were 14 girls enrolled in the preparatory school. The name was then changed to the Kathleen Laycock Country Day School as the sisters moved the school to a 26-acre campus, sold to them by the Bedford/Vanderbilt family. In 1970, the trustees voted to admit boys. Believing that it would be difficult to attract male students to "The Kathleen Laycock Country Day", the school was renamed to Greens Farms Academy.

== Athletics ==
The Greens Farms Academy Dragons compete in the Fairchester Athletic Association (FAA), consisting of independent schools in Fairfield County, CT and Westchester County, NY. Outside of their conference, GFA is a part of the NEPSAC (New England Preparatory School Athletic Council) where they compete against various prep schools across New England.

=== Wrestling ===
The wrestling team, coached by Jack Conroy '06, was ranked No. 30 in the National Preps in 2025.

Steven Burrell '23 won a national championship at the 2023 Prep Nationals.

Kayla Batres, then a junior at GFA, won a national title in 2025.

=== Sailing ===
The sailing team is coached by Peter Coleman. Fairfield Cup Champions in 2008. Fairfield County Gold Cup Champions in 2009. Connecticut State Champions in 2009. New England Schools Sailing Association’s ranked the Greens Farms Academy sailing program as the No. 1 interscholastic team in New England in April 2022.

== Facilities ==
Located on a 44-acre (18 ha) campus, the school borders three ecosystems: the salt marsh, Audubon woodland, and the Long Island Sound. The main building is a former Vanderbilt estate and Gilded Age mansion designed by architect Harrie T. Lindberg, the Stamford White protegé who was called "the American Lutyens". Two academic sections extend from the main building. On one side is the lower school where students from pre-K to 4th grade are located and on the other is the upper school that holds grades 5-12. GFA has two turf fields, three grass fields, a baseball field, 8 tennis courts, Squash courts, and a quarter of a track. Attached to the upper school there is a weight room, training room, and gymnasium. In 2024, GFA began construction of a new Athletic & Wellness Center (AWC). The project was designed by Claris Construction and Roger Ferris + Partners and was recently completed in late spring of 2026. The AWC was added on to the existing squash courts and includes two more courts, a field house, wrestling room, training arena, gym, and sports medicine room.
