= Greens Farms School =

- Green Farms School
- U.S. National Register of Historic Places
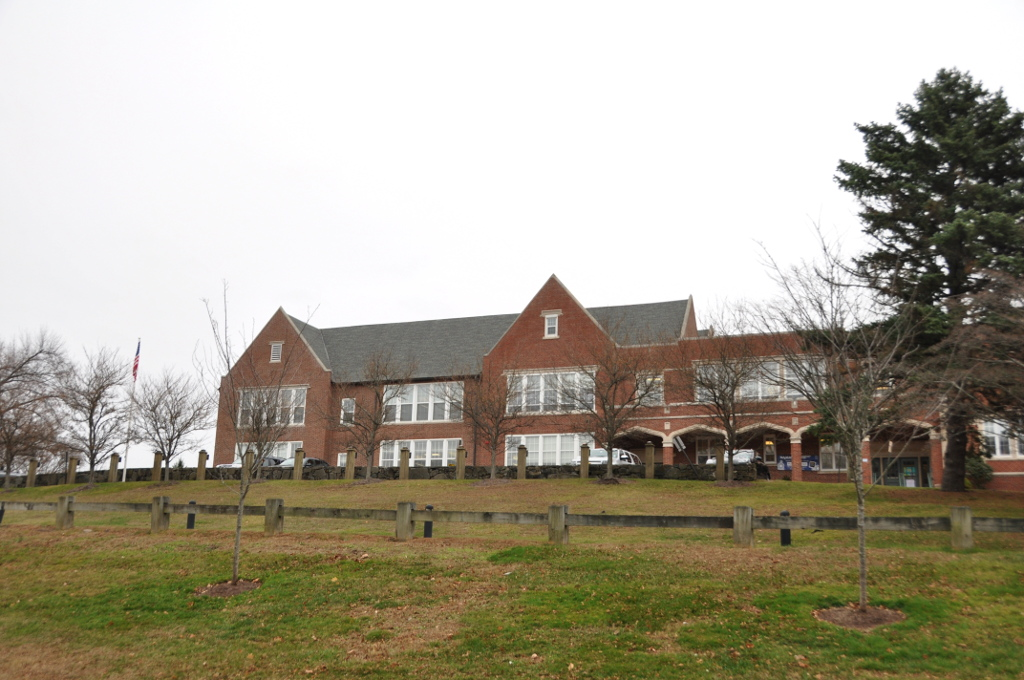

- Location within Connecticut Location within the United States
- Location: Junction of Morningside Drive South and Post Road East, Westport, Connecticut
- Coordinates: 41°08′15″N 73°19′30″W
- Area: 9 acres (3.6 ha)
- Built: 1925
- Architect: Cutler, Charles E.
- Architectural style: Tudor Revival
- MPS: Westport MPS
- NRHP reference No.: 91000391
- Added to NRHP: April 19, 1991

The Greens Farms School is a historic school building at Morningside Drive South and Post Road East in the Greens Farms neighborhood of Westport, Connecticut. It was built in 1925 and received an addition in 1950. It was designed by architect Charles Cutler in a Tudor Revival style, and is a fine example of such style. It is the only Tudor Revival school building in Westport. It was listed on the National Register of Historic Places in 1991.

Its interior includes a Works Project Administration art project from c. 1935.

It is located on the Boston Post Road. Due to declining enrollment the school closed in June 1983, after which it was leased by the Westport Arts Center.

In 1996 with increasing enrollment school officials in Westport began looking at options including reopening the Greens Farms School and brought in a consultant in the process. The Westport Arts Center representatives recommended that they stay in the building as the educational needs of Westport's student could be better realized in a new building. Westport school officials responded that a new building would cost the town $4.5 million more than using the building. In the end the decision was made that reclaiming the building was the "cheaper" course of action. The Westport Arts Center left the building and moved to a location next to the Saugatuck River.

In 1997, faced with rising pupil enrollments, the town reclaimed the school for use as an elementary school again. The school had to be renovated and expanded, which cost the town $16 million.

The school is now known as Greens Farms Elementary School.

== See also ==
- National Register of Historic Places listings in Fairfield County, Connecticut
