= Mill Cove Historic District =

Historic district in Connecticut, United States

- U.S. National Register of Historic Places
- U.S. Historic district
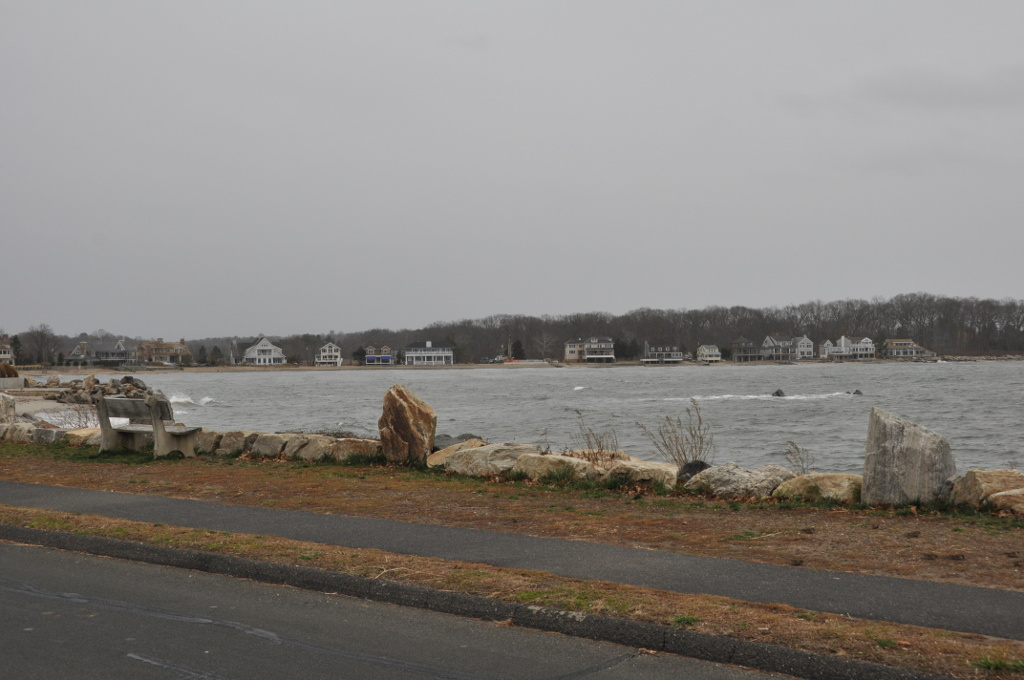
- View of the Mill Cove cottages, taken from across the river near Compo Point

- Location within Connecticut Location within the United States
- Location: Between Compo Mill Cove and Long Island Sound, Westport, Connecticut
- Coordinates: 41°6′47″N 73°20′32″W
- Area: 9 acres (3.6 ha)
- Architectural style: Colonial Revival, Bungalow/Craftsman
- MPS: Westport MPS
- NRHP reference No.: 91000392
- Added to NRHP: April 19, 1991

The Mill Cove Historic District is a 9-acre (3.6 ha) historic district in Westport, Connecticut, United States. The district was listed on the National Register of Historic Places in 1991. It consists of a small group of cottages, 15 of which are contributing buildings, and other cottages and outbuildings. These well-preserved collection of Colonial Revival and Bungalow-style cottages were built between 1908 and 1940 on a barrier beach facing Long Island Sound, and are only accessible on foot. They are generally small in size and set on open lots, although some, like the house at 52 Compo Mill Cove, have a high hedge for privacy.

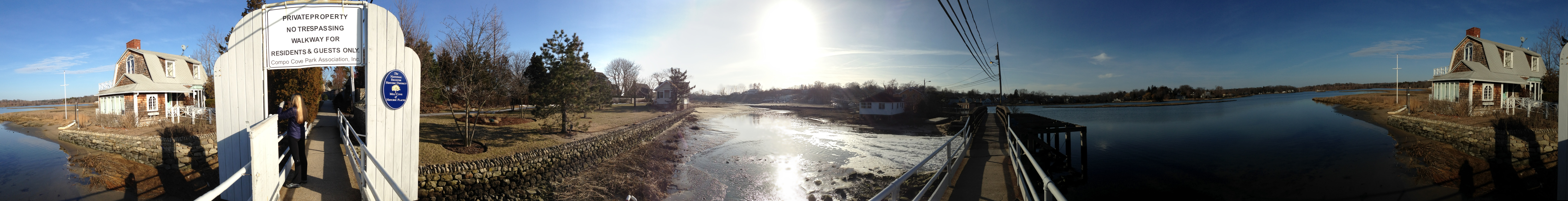
Mill Cove of Historical Places Panorama

== See also ==
- Compo–Owenoke Historic District
- National Register of Historic Places listings in Fairfield County, Connecticut
