= Bankside Farmers =

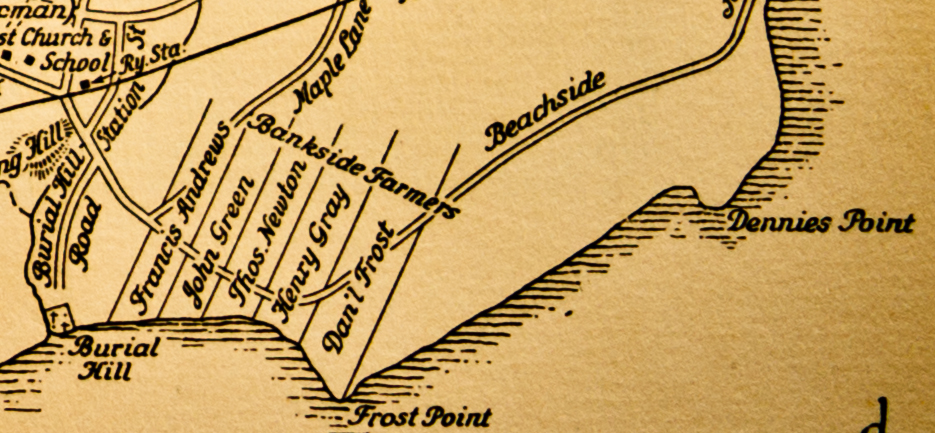
Old map showing Bankside Farmers

The Bankside Farmers were a group of five men who established themselves along the Long Island Sound south of Fairfield, Connecticut, in 1648. The area is now known as Greens Farms, a section of Westport, Connecticut.

They were: Thomas Newton, Henry Gray, John Green, Daniel Frost and Francis Andrews.

Daniel Frost was born January 17, 1613, in Nottingham, England, and died February 23, 1682, in Fairfield. A small coastal promontory, Frost Point, is named for Daniel Frost.

Henry Gray was born November 23, 1617, in London, England. He worked as a tailor with his elder brother William in London for a time. He arrived in New England in 1639. He married Daniel Frost's sister Lydia in Boston, Massachusetts, in September 1639. He came to Fairfield in 1640 and was a deputy from Fairfield from 1642-43. He died in 1658. Two roads in the area are named for him: Gray's Farm Road and Gray Lane.

Greens Farms is named for John Green.

This group of early settlers adopted the name "Bankside" to commemorate the original Bankside located in London, England, the district in which several of them had previously resided.
