= Old Hill, Connecticut =

Census-designated place in Connecticut, United States

- Census-designated place
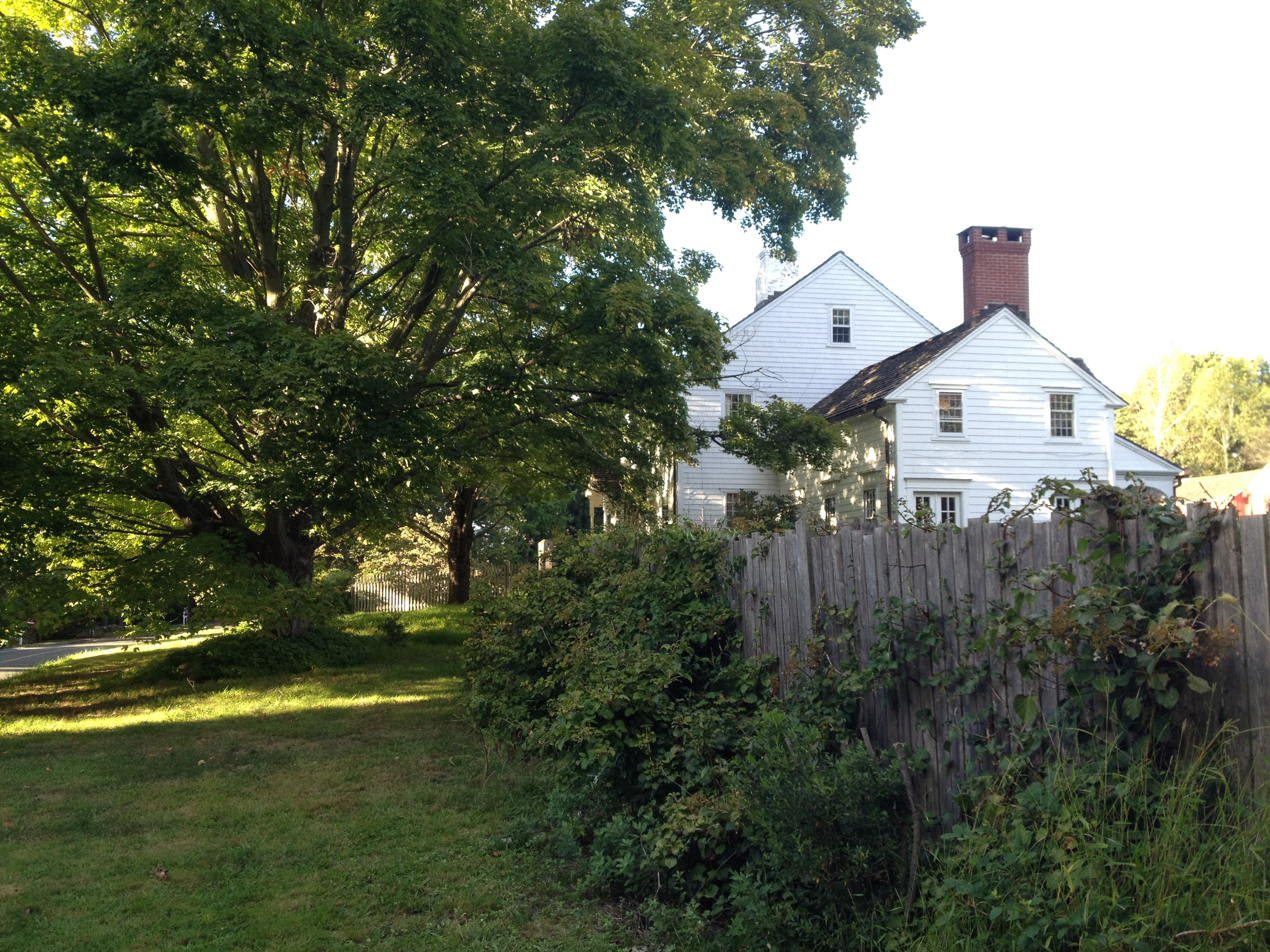
- A house in Old Hill

- Location within Connecticut Location within the United States
- Coordinates: 41°8′59″N 73°22′45″W
- Country: United States
- State: Connecticut
- County: Fairfield
- Town: Westport

Area
  - Total: 2.19 sq mi (5.68 km^{2})
  - Land: 2.16 sq mi (5.59 km^{2})
  - Water: 0.035 sq mi (0.09 km^{2})
- Elevation: 120 ft (37 m)
- Time zone: UTC-5 (Eastern (EST))
  - Summer (DST): UTC-4 (EDT)
- ZIP Code: 06880 (Westport)
- Area codes: 203/475
- FIPS code: 09-56935
- GNIS feature ID: 2805090

Old Hill is a census-designated place (CDP) in the town of Westport, Fairfield County, Connecticut, United States. As of the 2020 census, Old Hill had a population of 2,676. It is in the western part of the town and is bordered to the west by the city of Norwalk.

Old Hill was first listed as a CDP prior to the 2020 census.

== Demographics ==
=== 2020 census ===
As of the 2020 census, Old Hill had a population of 2,676. The median age was 44.6 years. 26.8% of residents were under the age of 18 and 18.5% of residents were 65 years of age or older. For every 100 females there were 95.6 males, and for every 100 females age 18 and over there were 90.8 males age 18 and over.

100.0% of residents lived in urban areas, while 0.0% lived in rural areas.

There were 948 households in Old Hill, of which 42.9% had children under the age of 18 living in them. Of all households, 70.1% were married-couple households, 9.6% were households with a male householder and no spouse or partner present, and 16.4% were households with a female householder and no spouse or partner present. About 15.6% of all households were made up of individuals and 8.5% had someone living alone who was 65 years of age or older.

There were 1,010 housing units, of which 6.1% were vacant. The homeowner vacancy rate was 0.7% and the rental vacancy rate was 14.2%.

Racial composition as of the 2020 census
Race	Number	Percent
White	2,283	85.3%
Black or African American	29	1.1%
American Indian and Alaska Native	1	0.0%
Asian	170	6.4%
Native Hawaiian and Other Pacific Islander	0	0.0%
Some other race	34	1.3%
Two or more races	159	5.9%
Hispanic or Latino (of any race)	143	5.3%
