= Greens Farms, Connecticut =

Neighborhood in Westport, Connecticut, United States

Coordinates: 41°07′26″N 73°19′09″W

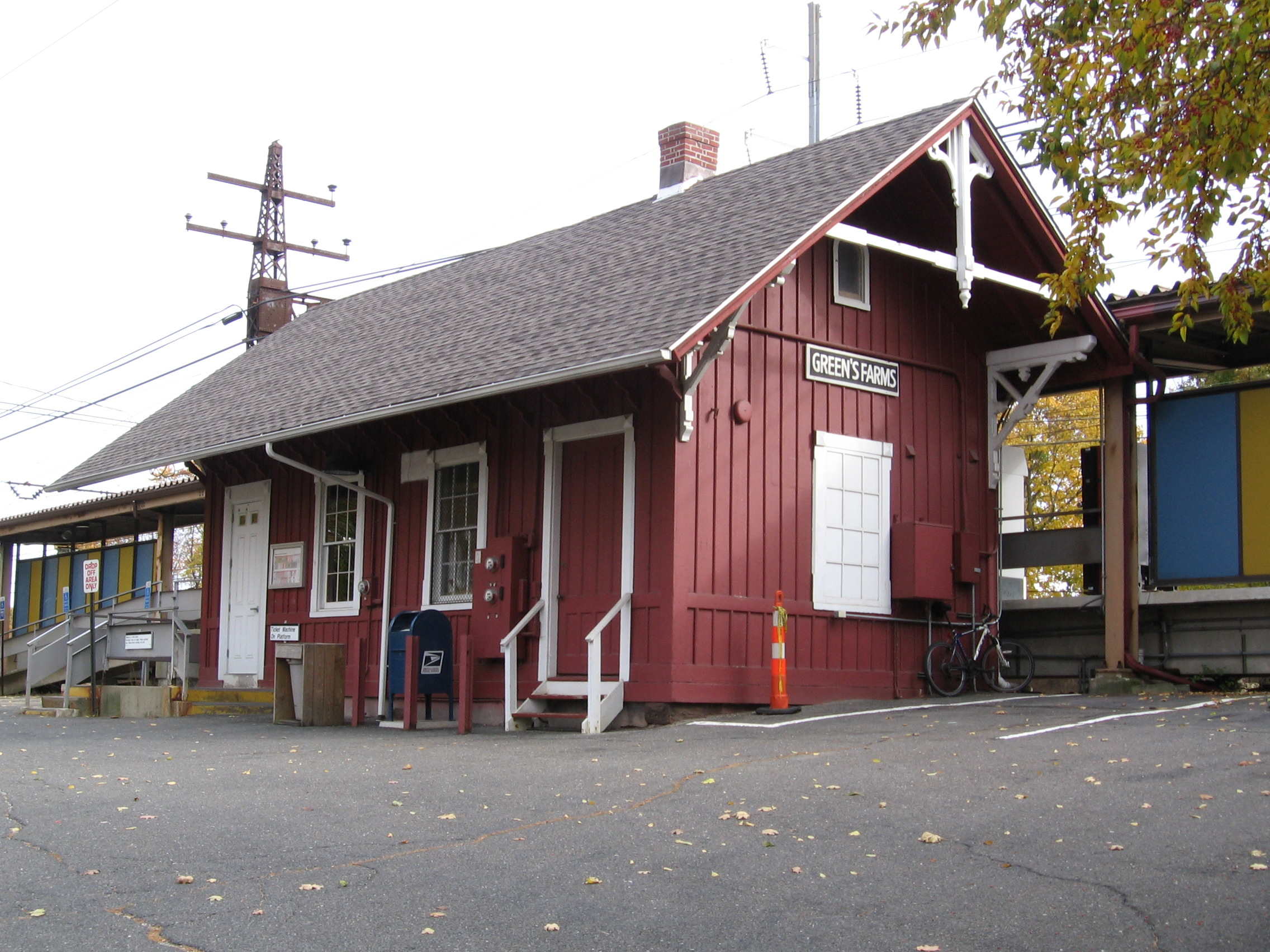
The station house, seen from the northwest, of the Metro-North station in the Greens Farms neighborhood of Westport, Connecticut.

Green's Farms is the oldest neighborhood in the town of Westport in Fairfield County, Connecticut, United States. It was first listed as a census-designated place at the 2020 census. As of the 2020 census, Green's Farms had a population of 3,125.

== Geography ==
=== Boundary ===
The boundaries of the neighborhood, like those of most neighborhoods with no governmental status, are vague, but according to a New York Times article in 2001, "generally, a resident can confidently claim a Green's Farms address if the property lies within the area bounded by Hillspoint Road, the Fairfield town line and the Post Road". The Greens Farms census-designated place as drawn in 2020 follows the same boundaries. According to the same article, Turkey Hill Road and Morningside Drive are the heart of the neighborhood.

=== Climate ===
The neighborhood enjoys a temperate climate and has many ecological systems, including a salt marsh.

=== Education, transport, and economy ===
Greens Farms is the home to a private coeducational K-12 institution that bears its namesake: Greens Farms Academy. The Green's Farms Railroad Station is located on New Creek Road. Exit 18 of Interstate 95 serves the neighborhood. Sherwood Island State Park is at the western edge of Greens Farms. The Nyala Farms Corporate Center, north of Sherwood Island, is home to Bridgewater Associates, the world's largest hedge fund, and Pequot Capital Management, a large investment management fund.

Green's Farms Elementary School serves students in kindergarten through Grade 5 in a Gothic-style building with a newer wing on the back containing a library-media center, computer lab and gymnasium.

== Demographics ==
=== 2020 census ===
Greens Farms was first listed as a census-designated place at the 2020 census. As of the 2020 census, Greens Farms had a population of 3,125. The median age was 46.4 years. 26.5% of residents were under the age of 18 and 21.2% of residents were 65 years of age or older. For every 100 females there were 90.0 males, and for every 100 females age 18 and over there were 85.3 males age 18 and over.

100.0% of residents lived in urban areas, while 0.0% lived in rural areas.

There were 1,113 households in Greens Farms, of which 36.3% had children under the age of 18 living in them. Of all households, 67.1% were married-couple households, 9.0% were households with a male householder and no spouse or partner present, and 21.1% were households with a female householder and no spouse or partner present. About 21.5% of all households were made up of individuals and 15.0% had someone living alone who was 65 years of age or older.

There were 1,238 housing units, of which 10.1% were vacant. The homeowner vacancy rate was 2.0% and the rental vacancy rate was 2.4%.

Racial composition as of the 2020 census
Race	Number	Percent
White	2,598	83.1%
Black or African American	45	1.4%
American Indian and Alaska Native	1	0.0%
Asian	179	5.7%
Native Hawaiian and Other Pacific Islander	0	0.0%
Some other race	53	1.7%
Two or more races	249	8.0%
Hispanic or Latino (of any race)	142	4.5%

== Etymology ==
The land holdings of John Green, one of the first five settlers, known collectively as the Bankside Farmers, were known as Green's Farm by 1699. In 1732 the area was officially renamed Green's Farms.

Within the area of Greens Farms is Frost Point named after one of the other Bankside Farmers Daniel Frost.

Greens Farms is also spelled in its original form, Green's Farms.

The First Congregational Church of Green's Farms, Green's Farms Railroad Station, The New York Times and the Green's Farms Association all use the apostrophe in the neighborhood name, which is used about half of the time. The Town of Westport, Connecticut state government and local newspapers do not.

== History ==
In 1648 the Town of Fairfield officially gave five farmers, collectively known as the Bankside Farmers, permission to settle the fertile land that the Pequot people were living in. The Bankside Farmers purchased the land from the Pequot who called it Machamux ("beautiful land"). The land that the Pequot sold, then within the original boundaries of the Town of Fairfield, stretched from "Frost Point an English mile along the seacoast toward Compaw, and six or seven miles inland." The Pequot moved to an area "elevated back east of this strip".

The first three settlers were Thomas Newton, Henry Gray and John Green. Daniel Frost and Francis Andrews later joined the Bankside Farmers making five in total.

They lived at the western end of what became Beachside Avenue.

On Green's Farms Road near Morningside Drive is the site of the first West Parish Common, the first schoolhouse, and the first meeting house. A small park there has a monument called Machamux Boulder.

Over the next 50 years, more land was bought from the Indians and the community grew. In 1711 the "West Parish of Fairfield" was established with church and civil functions. In 1732, the area was renamed "Green's Farms" in honor of John Green, one of the original five Bankside Farmers.

During the American Revolution, British soldiers burned down the Meeting House in a raid that also destroyed 15 houses and 11 barns. The only church property saved was the communion service that Deacon Ebenezer Jesup rescued by hiding it in his well. For the next 10 years, members of the church met in private homes. In 1789 a new church building was erected at the church's modern site at Hillandale Road. To raise money, pews were auctioned off. That building was replaced and, in April 1852, a fire forced another replacement the next year.

Burial Hill Beach was acquired by the Town of Westport in 1893.

In 1950, strong winds toppled the Congregational Church steeple, sending it through the roof of the Sunday School room (later the church parlor). The repair effort was expanded to include lighting for the steeple and a new Sunday School room which would double as a church social hall and the construction of a Sunday School wing. In 1961, the present social hall was added, together with more classrooms, a church office, ministers' offices and a choir room.

== Notable people ==
Famous residents of the neighborhood include or included actress Gene Tierney, writer Peter Straub, Marlo Thomas, Phil Donahue, comedian Rodney Dangerfield, film producer Harvey Weinstein and the radio talk-show host Don Imus. Martha Stewart once owned a home on Turkey Hill Road, from which she taped a television program, but she moved after long-running controversies about the effect of her television production business on the neighborhood. Edward M. Grout, a lawyer and New York City Comptroller, lived and died in Greens Farms.
