= Westport, Connecticut =

Town in Connecticut, U.S.

- Town
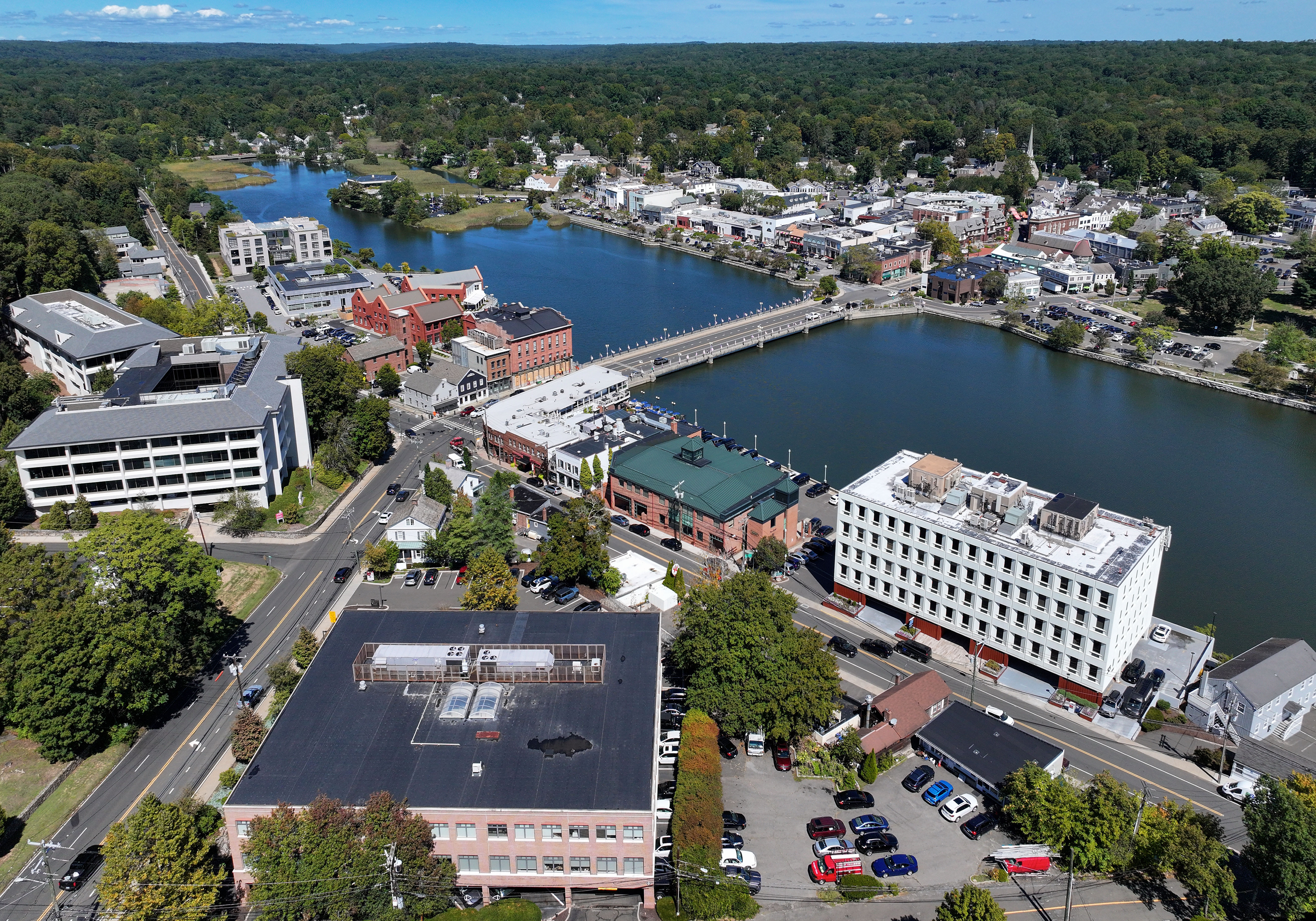
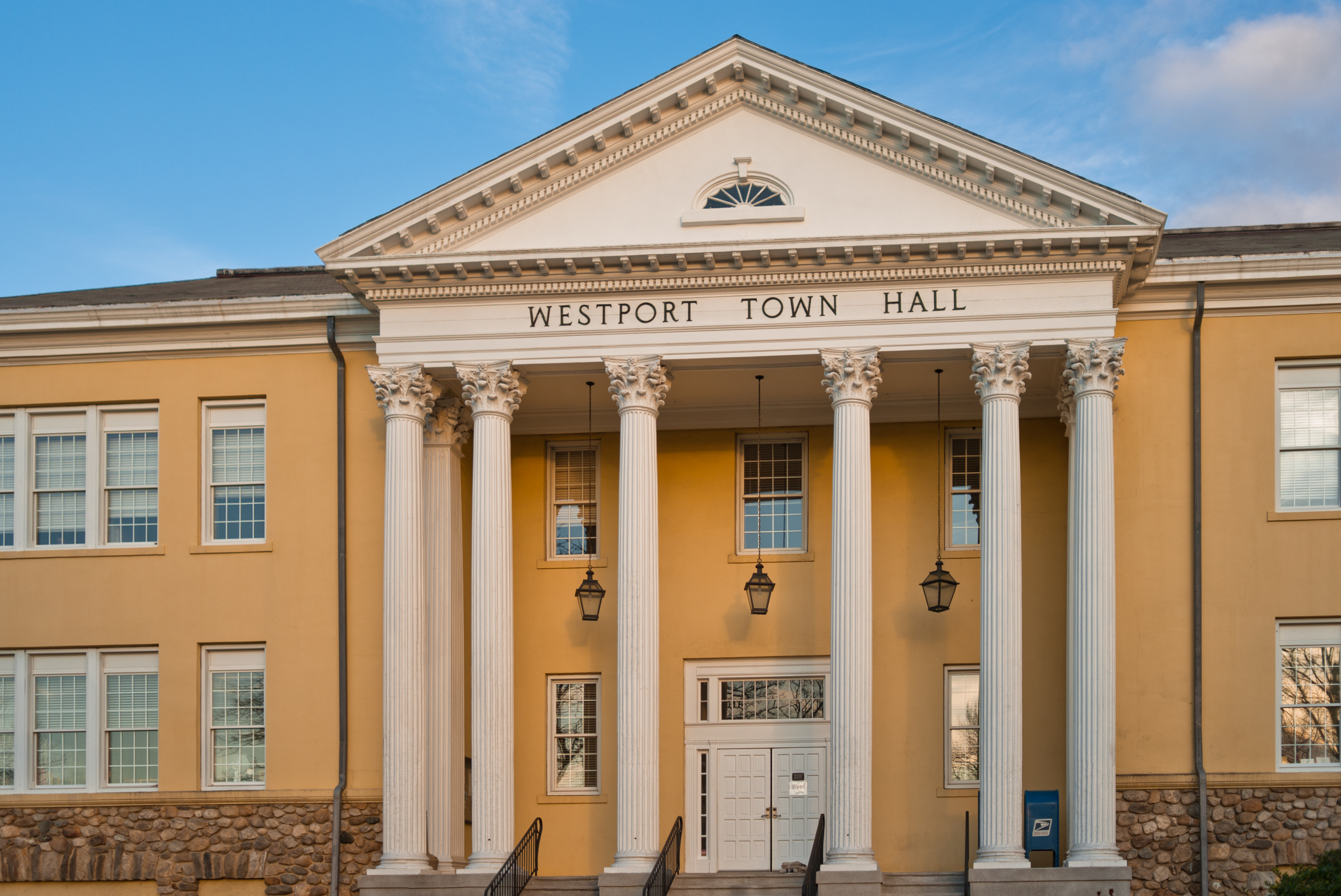
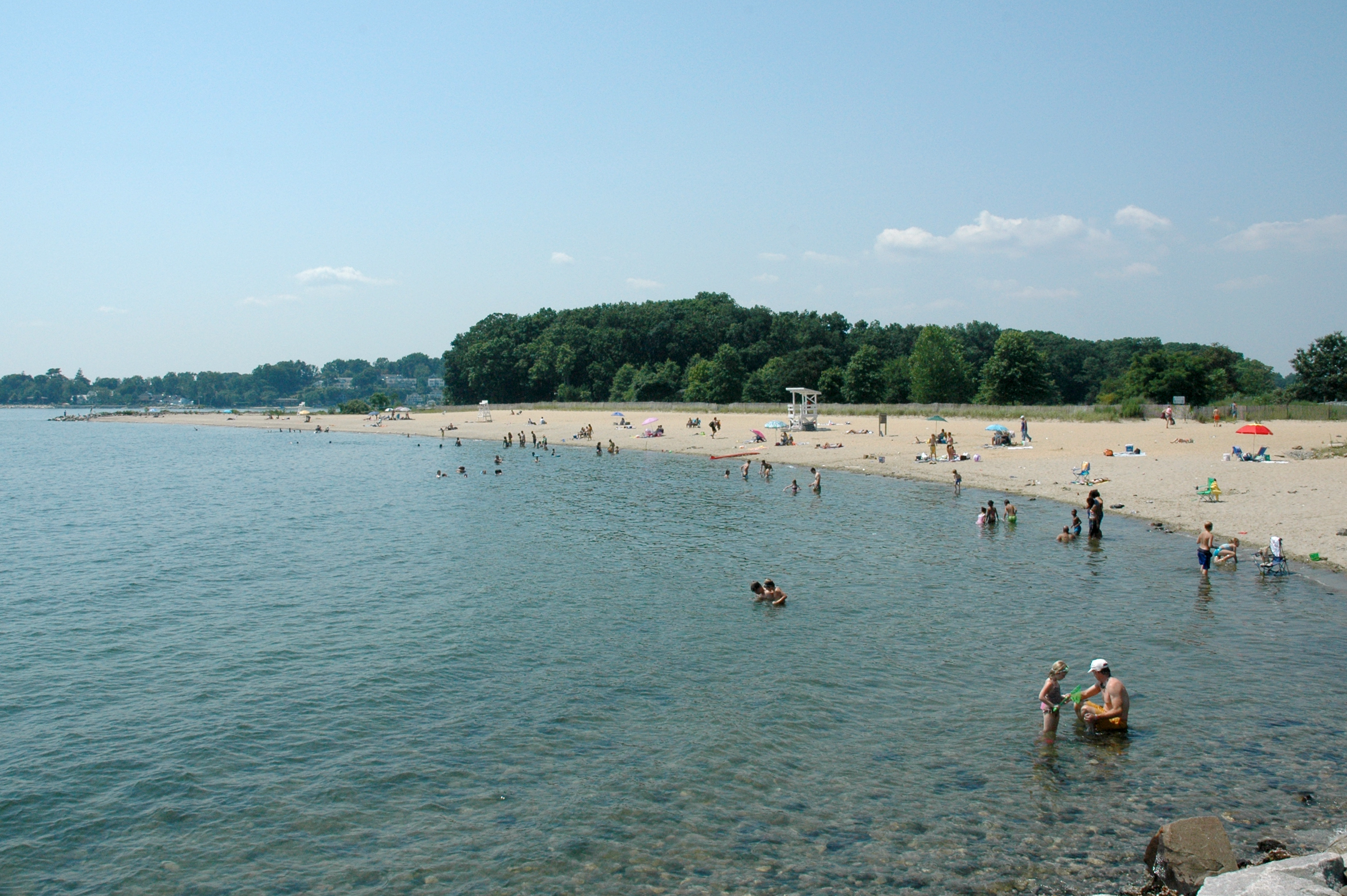
- Downtown Town Hall Sherwood Island State Park

- Flag Seal Logo
- Nickname: WePo
- Coordinates: 41°07′24″N 73°20′49″W
- Country: United States
- U.S. state: Connecticut
- County: Fairfield
- Region: Western CT
- Established: 1835
- Incorporated: May 28, 1835
- Founder: Bankside Farmers

Government
  - Type: RTM
  - 1st selectman: Kevin Christie (D)
  - 2nd selectwoman: Amy Wistreich (D)
  - 3rd selectman: Don O'Day (R)

Area
  - Total: 33.45 sq mi (86.6 km^{2})
  - Land: 19.96 sq mi (51.7 km^{2})
  - Water: 13.49 sq mi (34.9 km^{2})
- Elevation: 26 ft (8 m)

Population (2020)
  - Total: 27,141
  - Density: 1,359.8/sq mi (525.0/km^{2})
- Time zone: UTC−5 (Eastern)
  - Summer (DST): UTC−4 (Eastern)
- ZIP Code: 06880
- P.O. Boxes: 06881
- Area codes: 203/475
- FIPS code: 09-83500
- GNIS feature ID: 0213532
- Website: www.westportct.gov

Westport is a town in Fairfield County, Connecticut, United States. Located in the Gold Coast along the Long Island Sound, it is 48 miles (77 km) northeast of New York City and is part of the Western Connecticut Planning Region.

== History ==
The earliest known inhabitants of the Westport area as identified through archaeological finds date back 7,500 years. Records from the first white settlers report the Pequot Indians living in the area which they called Machamux translated by the colonialists as beautiful land. Settlement by colonialists dates back to the five Bankside Farmers; whose families grew and prospered into a community that continued expanding. The settlers arrived in 1693, having followed cattle to the isolated area. The community had its own ecclesiastical society, supported by independent civil and religious elements, enabling it to be independent from the Town of Fairfield. As the settlement expanded its name changed: it was briefly known as "Bankside" in 1693, officially named Green's Farm in 1732 in honor of Bankside Farmer John Green and in 1835 incorporated as the Town of Westport.

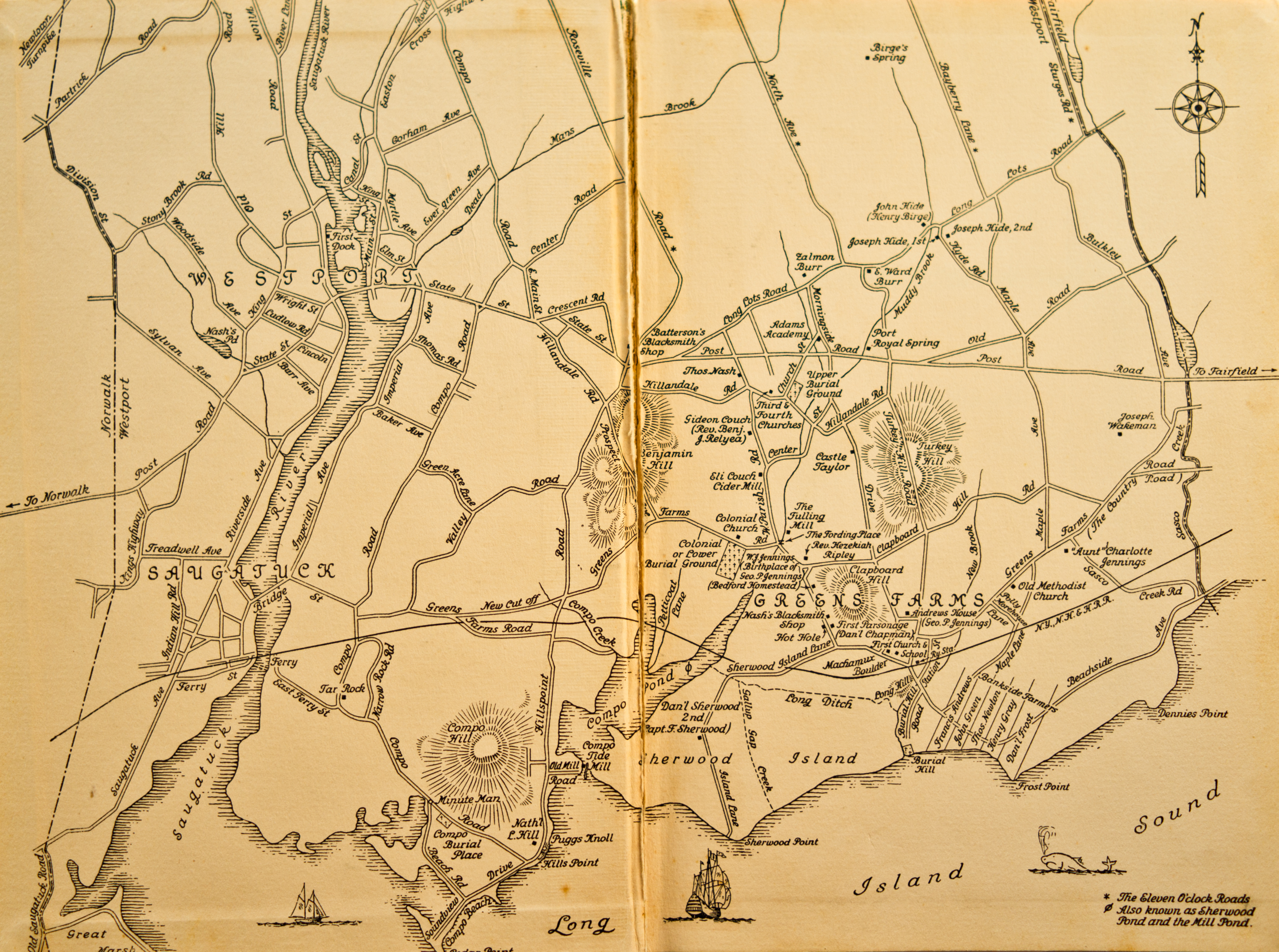
Historic map of Westport

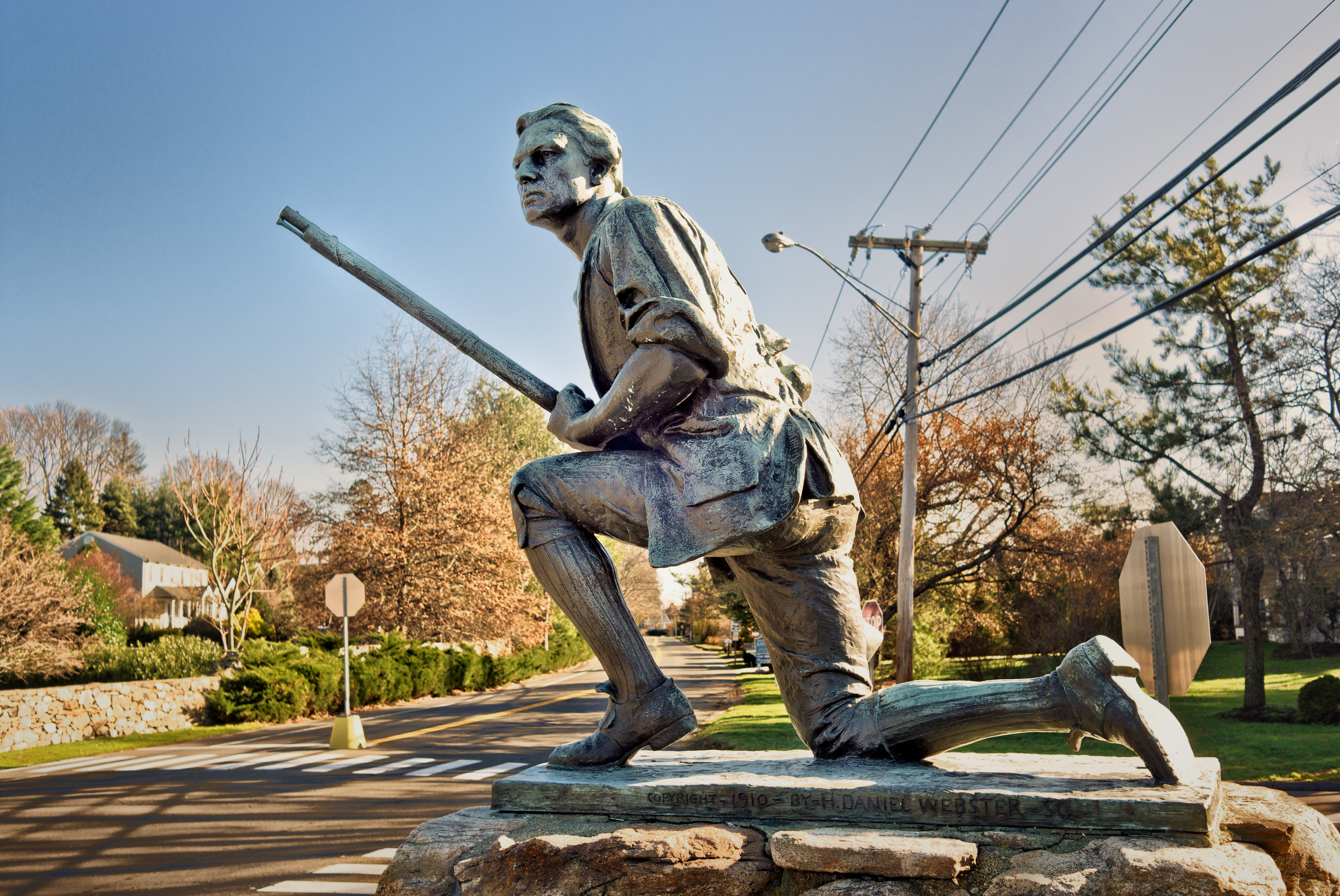
Statue of Minuteman near Compo Beach

During the Revolutionary War, on April 25, 1777, a British force of 1,850 under the command of the Royal Governor of the province of New York, Major General William Tryon, landed on Compo Beach to destroy the Continental Army's military supplies in Danbury. Minutemen from Westport and the surrounding areas crouched hiding while Tryon's troops passed and then launched an offensive from their rear. A statue on Compo Beach commemorates this plan of attack with a crouching Minuteman facing away from the beach, looking onto what would have been the rear of the troops. An additional statue of two cannons facing the water, a testament to the resistance the minutemen displayed, was erected on the beach in 1901. A sign on Post Road East also commemorates this event.

The Town of Westport was officially incorporated on May 28, 1835, with lands from Fairfield, Weston and Norwalk. Daniel Nash led 130 people of Westport in the petitioning of the Town of Fairfield for Westport's incorporation. The driving force behind the petition was to assist their seaport's economic viability that was being undermined by neighboring towns' seaports. For several decades after that, Westport was a prosperous agricultural community, distinguishing itself as the leading onion-growing center in the U.S. In addition, Westport became a shipping center in part to transport onions to market. Blight caused the collapse of Westport's onion industry, leading to mills and factories replacing agriculture as the town's economic engine.

Starting around 1910 the town experienced a cultural expansion. During this period artists, musicians, and authors such as F. Scott Fitzgerald moved to Westport to be free from the commuting demands experienced by business people. The roots of Westport's reputation as an arts center can be traced back to this period during which it was known as a "creative heaven."

In the 20th century, a combination of industrialization and popularity among New Yorkers attracted to fashionable Westport—which had attracted many artists and writers—resulted in farmers selling off their land. Westport changed from a community of farmers to a suburban development.

From the 1950s through the 1970s, New Yorkers relocating from the city to the suburbs discovered Westport's culture of artists, musicians and authors. The population grew rapidly, assisted by the ease of commuting to New York City and back again to rolling hills and the "natural beauty of the town." By this time Westport had "chic New York-type fashion shopping" and a school system with a good reputation, both factors contributing to the growth.

By the 21st century, Westport had developed into a center for finance and insurance, as well as professional, scientific and technical services.

== Geography ==
According to a publication by the 2010 Census, Westport has a total area of 33.45 square miles (86.6 km^{2}) of which 19.96 square miles (51.7 km^{2}) (59.67%) is land with the remaining area of 13.49 square miles (34.9 km^{2}) (40.20%) water.

Westport is bordered by Norwalk on the west, Weston to the north, Wilton to the northwest, Fairfield to the east and Long Island Sound to the south.

=== Climate ===
Climate data for Westport, Connecticut
Month	Jan	Feb	Mar	Apr	May	Jun	Jul	Aug	Sep	Oct	Nov	Dec	Year
Record high °F (°C)	68 (20)	71 (22)	79 (26)	95 (35)	97 (36)	97 (36)	102 (39)	97 (36)	99 (37)	89 (32)	77 (25)	66 (19)	102 (39)
Mean daily maximum °F (°C)	37 (3)	39 (4)	48 (9)	60 (16)	70 (21)	79 (26)	84 (29)	82 (28)	75 (24)	64 (18)	52 (11)	42 (6)	61 (16)
Mean daily minimum °F (°C)	19 (−7)	21 (−6)	29 (−2)	38 (3)	47 (8)	57 (14)	62 (17)	61 (16)	53 (12)	40 (4)	33 (1)	24 (−4)	40 (5)
Record low °F (°C)	−15 (−26)	−7 (−22)	−2 (−19)	17 (−8)	21 (−6)	34 (1)	45 (7)	41 (5)	31 (−1)	17 (−8)	14 (−10)	−9 (−23)	−15 (−26)
Average precipitation inches (mm)	4.2 (110)	3.15 (80)	4.33 (110)	4.37 (111)	4.36 (111)	3.94 (100)	3.83 (97)	3.89 (99)	4.54 (115)	3.89 (99)	4.04 (103)	3.96 (101)	48.5 (1,236)
Average snowfall inches (cm)	7.6 (19)	7.8 (20)	4.9 (12)	0.7 (1.8)	0 (0)	0 (0)	0 (0)	0 (0)	0 (0)	0 (0)	0.6 (1.5)	4.6 (12)	26.2 (66.3)
Average precipitation days (≥ 0.01 in)	6.3	5.9	6.8	7.3	7.7	7.1	6.6	6.5	6.3	5.7	6.4	6.3	78.9
Average snowy days (≥ 0.1 in)	3.5	2.9	1.2	0	0	0	0	0	0	0	0.1	1.4	9.1
Source 1: The Weather Company Record Low & High Data & Average Low & High Data & Average Precipitation Data
Source 2: USA.com Average snowfall inches & Average precipitation days & Average snowy days

=== Topography ===
Both the train station and a total of 26 percent of town residents live within the 100-year floodplain. The floodplain was breached in 1992 and 1996 resulting in damage to private property, the 1992 flooding of the train station parking lot and the implementation of flood mitigation measures that include town regulations that affect renovations and additions to building within the floodplain zone.

=== Neighborhoods ===
Neighborhoods of Westport

- Saugatuck – around the Westport railroad station near the southwestern corner of the town – a built-up area with some restaurants, stores and offices. Saugatuck originates from the Paugussett tribe meaning "mouth of the tidal river."
  - Saugatuck Shores – a curved peninsula surrounded by the Long Island Sound, this area was once part of the town of Norwalk. Today several hundred residents live on the peninsula, which became part of Westport in the 1960s.
  - Saugatuck Island – founded in the 1890s as Greater Marsh Shores, the island was renamed Saugatuck Island in 1920 and became a special taxing district on November 5, 1984.
- Westport Village – The area around Post Road and Main Street on and near the Saugatuck River that serves as the center of Westport, with many shops and restaurants. There has been recent growth in the downtown area, including Levitt Pavilion, and Bedford square, a mixed-use development incorporating the Bedford Mansion.
- Greens Farms – Westport's oldest neighborhood, starting around Hillspoint Road and ending at Westport's boundary on the east side. Greens Farms has its own post office and train station.
- Cockenoe Island (pronounced "KuhKEEnee") – just off the southeastern coast of the town. Cockenoe Island is an uninhabited island that was purchased by Westport for $212,740 from the United Illuminating Company in 1969 so that the company could not use the land to build a nuclear plant.
- Old Hill – west of the Saugatuck River and north of the Post Road, a historic section of town with many homes from the Revolutionary and Victorian eras. Prior to the road being called the Boston Post Road it was called the Connecticut Turnpike.
- Coleytown – Located at the northern edge of town, near the Weston town line. Home to Coleytown fire station, Middle and Elementary school. Named for Farmer Coley, who owned lots of land in this area.
- Compo – Located around the main beach in the town, Compo Beach. Compo (Compaug), can be traced back to the early Paugussett tribe and means the bear's fishing ground.
- SewTrol – The area containing the Town Sewage Treatment Plant, the Town Animal Control, and the State Boat Launch.
- Poplar Plains – The northwest corner of the town, bordered to the southwest by the city of Norwalk, to the northwest by the town of Wilton, to the northeast by the town of Weston, to the east by the Saugatuck River, and to the south by the Merritt Parkway.
- Staples – The eastern side of the town, bordered to the north by Cross Highway, to the west by Compo Road, to the south by U.S. Route 1 (Post Road), and to the east by the town of Fairfield.
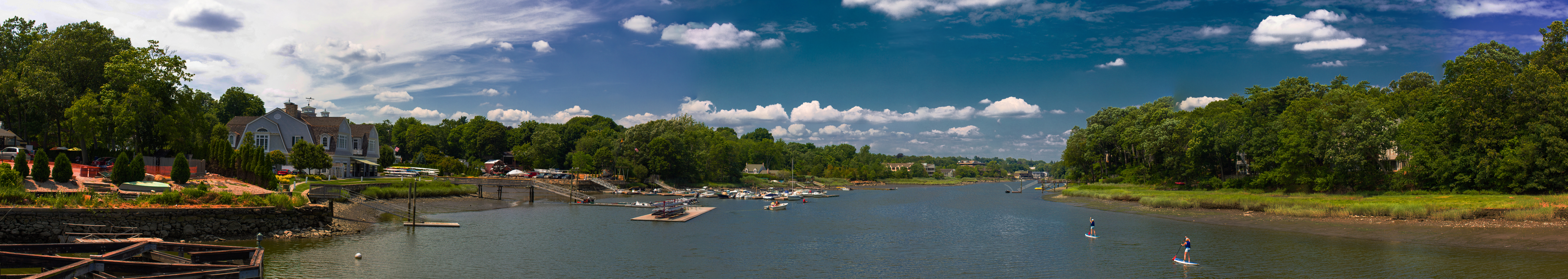
View of Saugatuck River from Saugatuck River Bridge

== Demographics ==
Historical population
Census	Pop.	Note	%±
1840	1,803		—
1850	2,651		47.0%
1860	3,293		24.2%
1870	3,361		2.1%
1880	3,477		3.5%
1890	3,715		6.8%
1900	4,017		8.1%
1910	4,259		6.0%
1920	5,114		20.1%
1930	6,073		18.8%
1940	8,258		36.0%
1950	11,667		41.3%
1960	20,955		79.6%
1970	27,318		30.4%
1980	25,290		−7.4%
1990	24,410		−3.5%
2000	25,749		5.5%
2010	26,391		2.5%
2020	27,141		2.8%
CT.gov

The 2019 US Census reported a population estimate of 28,491 with the median household income at $206,466.

The 2010 US Census counted the total number of households in Westport being 9,573 of which 7,233 (75.6%) were family households. The population density was 1,322.2 inhabitants per square mile (510.5/km^{2}). There were 10,065 housing units at an average density of 503.0 per square mile (194.2/km^{2}).

According to the 2010 Census, the population of Westport was 92.6% White, 4.0% Asian, 1.2% Black or African American, and 0.1% American Indian. Individuals from other races made up 0.6% of Westport's population while individuals from two or more races made up 1.6%. In addition, Latinos of any race made up 3.5% of Westport's population. About 29.8% of Westport residents were younger than age 18 as of 2010; higher than the U.S. average of 24%.

According to the 2000 Census, there were 9,586 households, of which 38.4% had children under the age of 18 living with them, 66.1% were married couples living together, 6.8% have a woman whose husband does not live with her, and 25.2% were non-families. 20.8% of all households were made up of individuals, and 8.8% had someone living alone who was 65 years of age or older. The average household size was 2.66 and the average family size was 3.10.

In the town, the population was spread out, with 27.9% under the age of 18, 2.7% from 18 to 24, 26.2% from 25 to 44, 28.0% from 45 to 64, and 15.1% who were 65 years of age or older. The median age was 41 years. For every 100 females, there were 90.7 males. For every 100 females age 18 and over, there were 86.3 males.

According to a 2007 estimate, the median income for a household in the town was $147,391, and the median income for a family was $176,740. As of the 2000 Census, males had a median income of $100,000 versus $53,269 for females. The per capita income for the town was $73,664. 2.6% of the population and 1.5% of families were below the poverty line. Out of the total people living in poverty, 2.7% are under the age of 18 and 2.1% are 65 or older.

In July 2008, Westport was named the fifth top-earning city in the US, with a median family income of $193,540 and median home price of $1,200,000. In 2018, data from the American Community Survey revealed that Westport was the 9th wealthiest city in the United States.

== Economy ==
=== Commerce and industry ===
The financial services sector employs 7,171 in Westport; half of whom commute daily to Westport. The financial services industry is a major segment of the local economy. The major financial services companies in Westport are Bridgewater Associates, a global investment manager and Westport's largest employer, and BNY Mellon. Professional, scientific, and technical services companies include Terex, a Fortune 500 company manufacturing industrial equipment and offering professional and technical services around those products, and dLife, a multimedia diabetes education (and marketing) company.

=== Nonprofits ===
- Save the Children, the American charity, governed entirely separately from the British charity of the same name, was headquartered in Westport before moving to Fairfield
- The Smith Richardson Foundation, a public policy think tank, is headquartered in Westport, Connecticut
- Joseph J. Clinton Veterans of Foreign Wars (VFW) Post 399 and August Matthias American Legion Post 63 are 501(c)(19) Non Profit charities located in Westport.

== Arts and culture ==
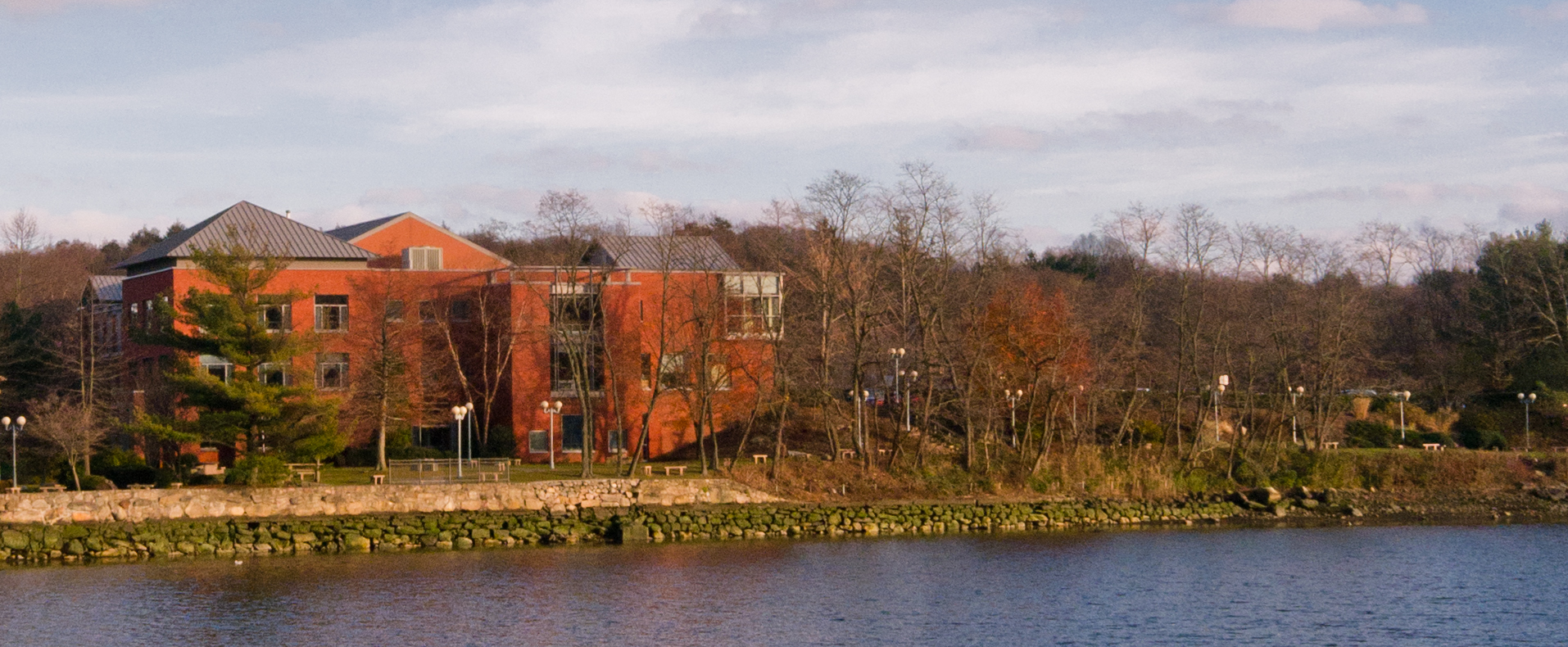
Westport Library across Saugatuck River

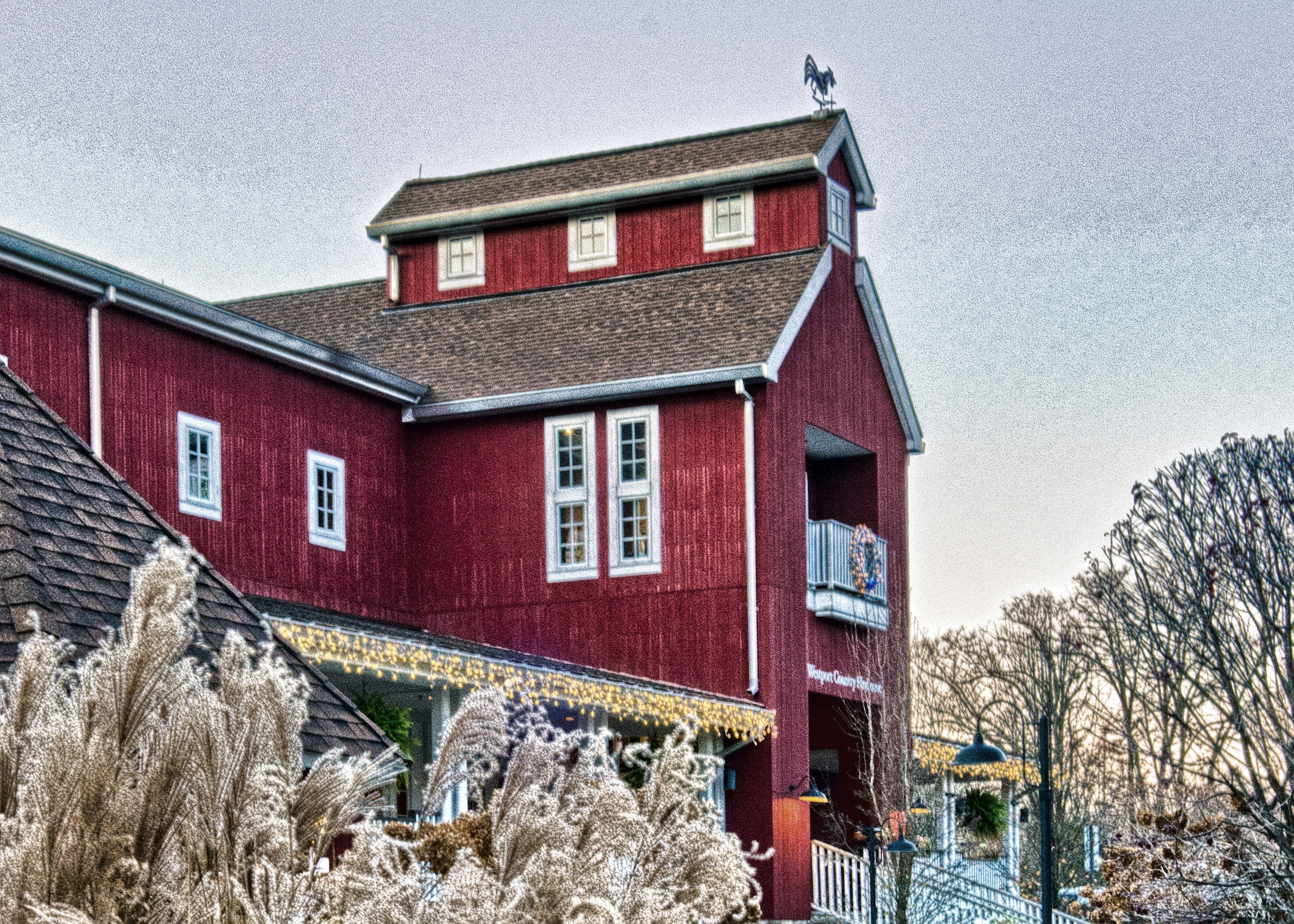
Westport Country Playhouse

=== Attractions ===
- The Westport Country Playhouse, founded in 1930, is a regional theater. After Paul Newman moved to Westport in 1960, he became a principal "driving force" behind the playhouse.
- Museum of Contemporary Art (MoCA) Westport, part of the Westport Arts Center; the facility was expanded in 2019 to include the permanent contemporary art collection.
- Westport Museum for History and Culture, founded in 1889, is dedicate to the history of Westport.
- The Wakeman Town Farm is a historic working farm and sustainability demonstration center.
- The Rolnick Observatory is located on a former Nike missile site.
- Earthplace, The Nature Discovery Center, is a 62-acre (250,000 m^{2}) natural history museum, nature center and wildlife sanctuary.

== Parks and recreation ==
Comprising 234 acres (0.95 km^{2}), Sherwood Island State Park is located on Long Island Sound and includes beach access. Compo Beach and Burying Hill Beach are municipal beaches that are open to out-of-town visitors in the summer for a fee. The state's 9/11 memorial was put in Sherwood Island State Park in Westport; on a clear day the New York City skyline can be seen.

In 1960, Westport purchased Longshore Club Park.

In 2011, Paul Newman's estate gave land to Westport to be managed by the Aspetuck Land Trust.

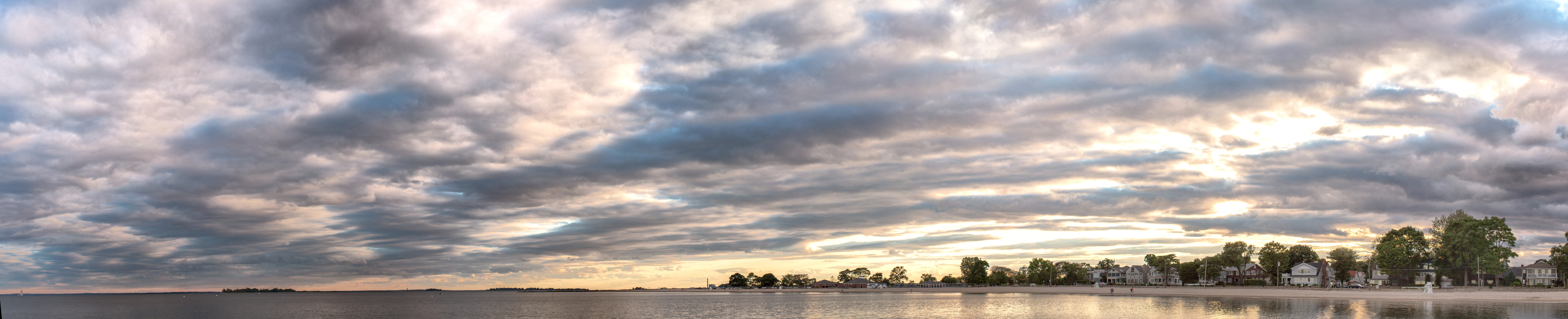
Compo Beach in Westport

== Government ==
Westport town vote by party in presidential elections
Year	Democratic	Republican	Third Parties
2024	71.4% 11,769	27.2% 4,476	1.4% 237
2020	74.46% 13,048	24.09% 4,222	1.45% 253
2016	68.99% 10,655	26.99% 4,169	4.01% 620
2012	56.45% 8,495	42.79% 6,439	0.76% 114
2008	65.05% 10,067	34.52% 5,342	0.43% 66
2004	59.47% 9,115	39.56% 6,063	0.98% 150
2000	57.35% 8,304	38.61% 5,590	4.05% 586
1996	51.61% 7,331	40.73% 5,785	7.67% 1,089
1992	48.10% 7,799	38.02% 6,166	13.88% 2,251
1988	44.32% 6,519	54.73% 8,051	0.95% 140
1984	38.58% 5,774	61.21% 9,162	0.21% 31
1980	30.26% 4,381	53.95% 7,810	15.79% 2,285
1976	40.97% 6,053	58.73% 8,677	0.30% 44
1972	40.23% 5,937	58.98% 8,705	0.79% 116
1968	42.34% 5,435	54.82% 7,037	2.84% 365
1964	59.54% 6,939	40.46% 4,716	0.00% 0
1960	35.86% 3,825	64.14% 6,842	0.00% 0
1956	24.60% 2,232	75.40% 6,842	0.00% 0

Westport, like Connecticut as a whole, is heavily Democratic. Hillary Clinton outscored Donald Trump by 42 points in 2016. Joe Biden went on to beat Trump by more than 50 points in 2020, marking the best performance for a Democratic presidential nominee in the town in over 60 years.

Westport was one of five towns in Connecticut that backed former Governor John Kasich over Donald Trump in the 2016 Republican presidential primary. Kasich received 1,098 votes (46.19 percent) ahead of Trump who garnered 1,053 votes (44.30 percent). U.S. Senator Ted Cruz of Texas finished third with 165 votes (6.94 percent).

The town switched to a Representative Town Meeting style governance in 1949. The government consists of a three-member Board of Selectmen, a Representative Town Meeting (RTM), a Board of Finance, a Board of Education, a Planning and Zoning Commission, and various other commissions, boards, and committees.

Voter registration and party enrollment as of October 26, 2021
Party	Active voters	Inactive voters	Total voters	Percentage
Democratic	8,495	729	9,224	42.51%
Republican	3,845	404	4,249	19.58%
Unaffiliated	7,289	731	8,020	36.97%
Minor parties	186	17	203	0.94%
Total	19,815	1,881	21,696	100%

=== Taxes ===
As of 2019, the mill rate of Westport is 16.86.

== Education ==
=== Schools ===
==== Public schools ====
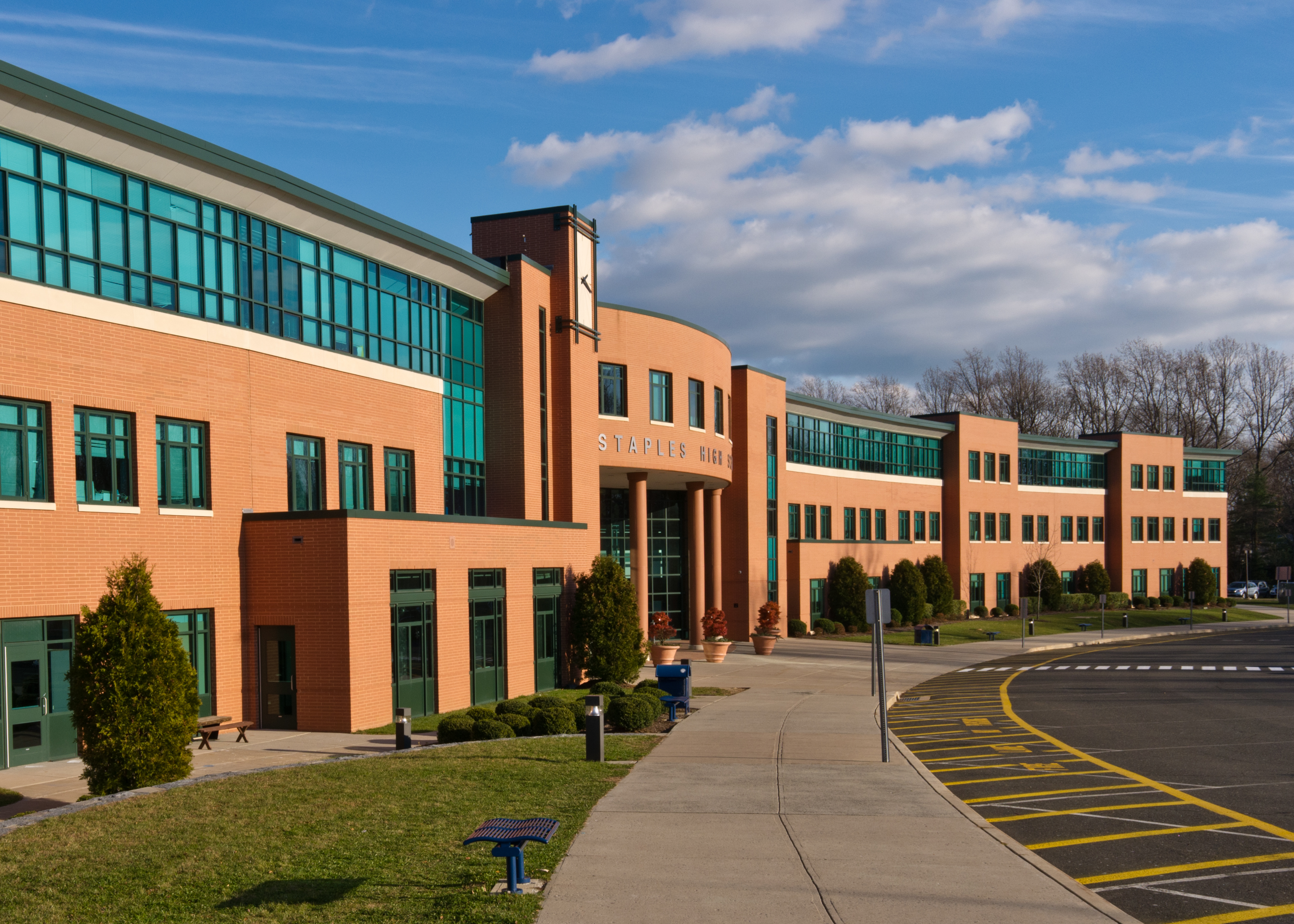
Staples High School

Staples High School is Westport's only public high school.

The district has two middle schools, Bedford Middle School and Coleytown Middle School. In September 2009, Bedford Middle School was awarded the government-honored Blue Ribbon Award.

There are five elementary schools with a total of 2,556 students:

- Coleytown Elementary School
- King's Highway Elementary School
- Greens Farms Elementary School
- Saugatuck Elementary School
- Long Lots Elementary School

==== Private schools ====
Greens Farms Academy, located in the 1920s Vanderbilt estate overlooking Long Island Sound, is a K–12 private preparatory school located in the Greens Farms section of town.

== Media ==
Westport's first newspaper dates back to the printing and publication of the first issue of The Saugatuck Journal on December 26, 1828.

Westport is served by both English-language newspapers and news websites including Westport News and WestportNow. The town is also home to a monthly magazine Westport, and the blog, 06880.

== Infrastructure ==
=== Transportation ===
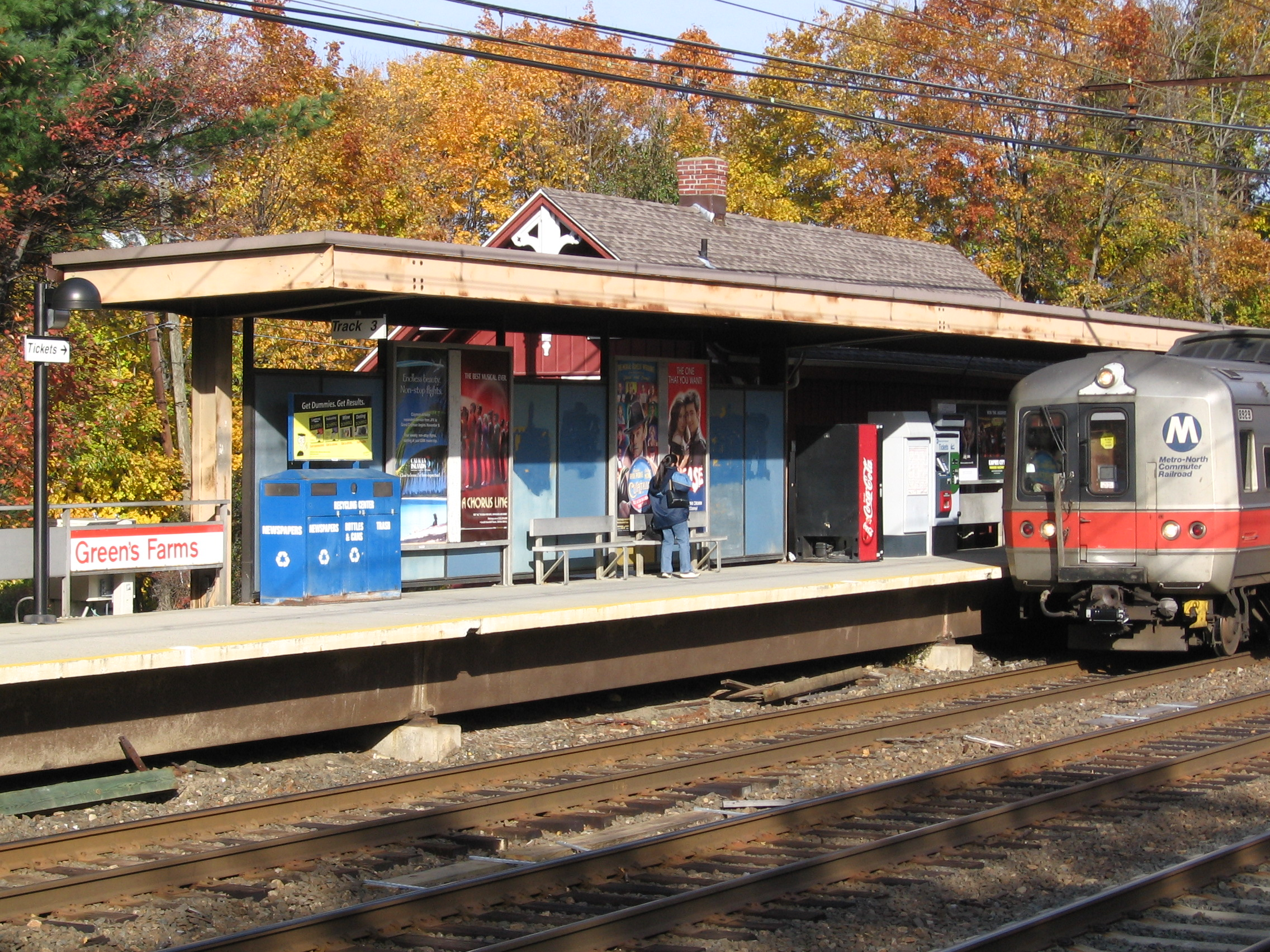
Green's Farms station

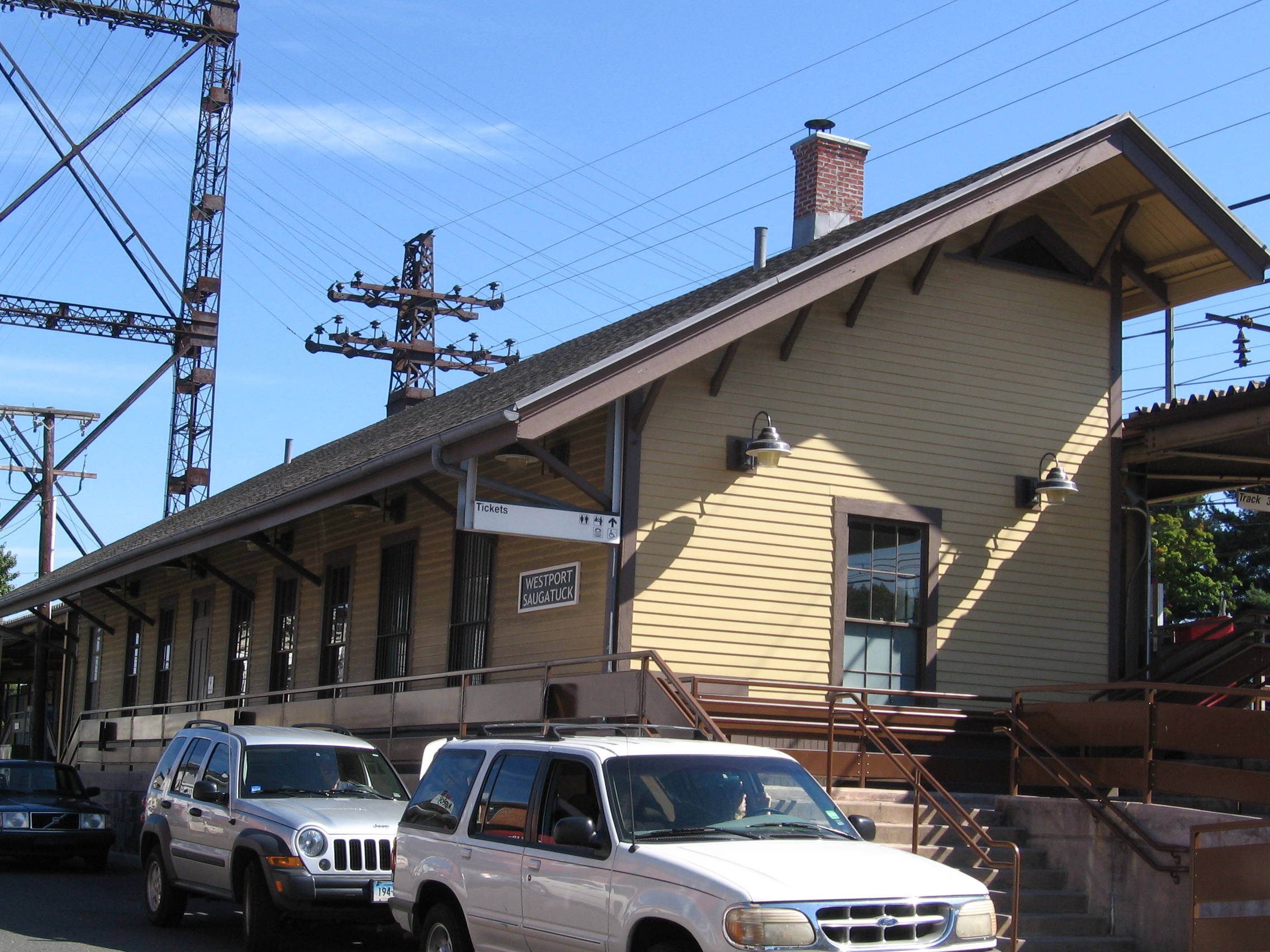
Westport station

Westport has two stations on Metro-North Railroad's New Haven Line

Interstate 95, the Merritt Parkway, and U.S. 1, as well as the Saugatuck River, run through Westport.

Westport has two train stations, Green's Farms and Westport on the Metro-North Railroad's New Haven Line, which serves Stamford and Grand Central Terminal in New York City or New Haven Union Station. This line is shared with Amtrak as part of the Northeast Corridor, but no Amtrak services stop at Green's Farms or Westport. The nearest Amtrak stations are at Bridgeport (10 miles) and Stamford (12 miles).

As of 2019, Westport has the highest per capita electric vehicle ownership among municipalities in Connecticut, and #3 overall.

The Norwalk Transit District offers transit options.

=== Police department ===
As of 2020, the Westport Police Department has a full-time complement of 64 sworn police officers that serve the Town of Westport. This department has purchased electric and hybrid fleets.

=== Fire department ===
The town of Westport is protected by the paid, full-time firefighters of the Westport Fire Department. Established in 1929, the Westport Fire Department operates out of four fire stations, located throughout the town, and maintains a fire apparatus fleet of six engines, (four first line and two reserve) one truck, one rescue, one fireboat, one High Water Unit, one utility unit and one Shift Commander's unit. The fire department also holds the Fairfield County Hazardous Materials Truck, housed at Westport Fire Headquarters. The Westport Fire Department responds to, on average, approximately 4,000 emergency calls annually.

== Notable people ==
Among the many actors, singers and other entertainers who have lived in town is Paul Newman who resided in Westport from 1960 until his death in 2008. His wife, Joanne Woodward, still resides in town. Fala (1940–1952), President Franklin D. Roosevelt's dog, was an early Christmas gift from Mrs. Augustus G. Kellogg, a town resident. Actress Grace Carney moved to Westport in 1979, when she became president of United Tool and Die, a company started by her father. She died in the city in 2009. Actress Gene Tierney grew up in Greens Farms. Adult film star Marilyn Chambers grew up in Westport under her given name Marilyn Briggs. Martha Stewart also lived in Westport at her historic estate of Turkey Hill. Jean Donovan, a lay Roman Catholic missionary martyred in El Salvador in 1980 grew up in Westport and graduated from Staples High School. She is honored on the litany of saints by the Lutheran World Federation and by The Anglican Communion. Academy Award winner Sandy Dennis lived in Westport until her death in 1992. Former FDA chief Scott Gottlieb is a resident of Westport. Former FBI director, James Comey, was a long-time resident of the town. Scott and Zelda Fitzgerald also lived in Westport around 1920. Keith Richards, a founder member of The Rolling Stones has lived in Weston for many years.

== In popular culture ==
- In the television series The West Wing, Josh Lyman is a native of Westport
- Westport was the location of the fictional residence (1164 Morning Glory Circle) of Darrin and Samantha Stephens on the television series Bewitched
- In the sixth and final season of I Love Lucy, the Ricardos and Mertzes leave New York and move to Westport
- The Twilight Zone had one episode called "A Stop at Willoughby", wherein the main character worked in NYC and commuted by train to his home in Westport. It aired on May 6, 1960, and the episode was written by then-Westport resident Rod Serling
- The 1955 film The Man in the Gray Flannel Suit includes a scene where Jennifer Jones meets Gregory Peck at the Westport station
- The Swimmer (1968), a film starring Burt Lancaster, is based on a short story by John Cheever. Most of the film was shot in backyard pool locations in Westport
- The Stepford Wives (1975) was filmed in various Westport locations and used a colonial house in the Williamsburg district as the home of the main characters
- Don DeLillo's Underworld (1997) features an ad executive named Charlie Wainwright who in 1961 lives in Westport
- The 1998 production This Is My Father was partly filmed in Westport
- The 2004 film The Girl Next Door was vaguely based on Westport – director Luke Greenfield grew up in town. It was filmed and set in California. That same decade parts of the 2008 production of The Sisterhood of the Traveling Pants 2 were filmed in Westport
- American Housewife primarily takes place in Westport
- Robert Lawson's children's novel Rabbit Hill depicts a colony of anthropomorphic rabbits living in the countryside near Westport
- In The Last Olympian, the final novel of the Percy Jackson & the Olympians series by Rick Riordan, the titular character, Percy Jackson, travels to Westport to visit antagonist Luke Castellan's childhood home
- The Land of Steady Habits is set in Westport

== Sister cities ==
As of 2023, Westport has four sister cities:

- Lyman, Ukraine
- Marigny-le-Lozon, France
- Yangzhou, Jiangsu, China
- St. Petersburg, Russia
