= National Register of Historic Places listings in Ottawa County, Michigan =

The following is a list of Registered Historic Places in Ottawa County, Michigan.
This National Park Service list is complete through NPS recent listings posted January 30, 2026.

	Name on the Register	Image	Date listed	Location	City or town	Description
1	Battle Point Site	Battle Point Site	August 14, 1973 (#73000956)	Battle Point, Grand River; 43°02′20″N 86°08′40″W	Crockery Township	
2	Aloys Bilz House	Aloys Bilz House	December 14, 1987 (#87002139)	107 S. Division St. 43°04′34″N 86°12′03″W	Spring Lake	
3	Isaac Cappon House	Isaac Cappon House	January 26, 1984 (#84001478)	228 W. 9th St. 42°47′21″N 86°07′04″W	Holland	
4	Max and Esther De Pree House	Max and Esther De Pree House	April 17, 2017 (#100000886)	279 S. Division St. 42°48′24″N 86°00′17″W	Zeeland	
4	De Zwaan Windmill	De Zwaan Windmill	April 17, 2018 (#100002333)	Windmill Island Gardens, 1 Lincoln Ave. 42°47′58″N 86°05′45″W	Holland	
4	Edward P. Ferry House	Edward P. Ferry House	March 19, 1982 (#82002860)	514 Lafayette St. 43°03′35″N 86°13′38″W	Grand Haven	
5	Fruitport Road–Pettys Bayou Bridge	Fruitport Road–Pettys Bayou Bridge	December 17, 1999 (#99001535)	Fruitport Rd. over Pettys Bayou; 43°05′22″N 86°10′31″W	Spring Lake Township	
6	Egbert H. Gold Estate	Egbert H. Gold Estate	December 27, 1984 (#84000548)	1116 Marigold Ln. 42°46′51″N 86°09′21″W	Holland	
7	Grand Haven Historic District	Grand Haven Historic District	September 6, 2016 (#16000584)	Washington Ave, adjacent Sts Harbor Dr. through 600 blocks 43°03′53″N 86°14′01″W	Grand Haven	
8	Grand Rapids, Grand Haven and Muskegon Railway Depot	Grand Rapids, Grand Haven and Muskegon Railway Depot	February 6, 1973 (#73002294)	363 W. Main St. 43°03′51″N 85°56′13″W	Coopersville	
9	Grand Trunk Western Railroad Grand Haven Coal Tipple	Grand Trunk Western Railroad Grand Haven Coal Tipple	September 6, 2016 (#16000583)	300 Block of N. Harbor Dr. in Chinook Pier Park; 43°04′05″N 86°13′51″W	Grand Haven	
10	Holland Downtown Historic District	Holland Downtown Historic District	October 4, 1990 (#90001534)	Roughly Eighth St. from just east of College Ave. to River Ave. and River Ave. from Ninth St. to just north of Eighth St. 42°47′24″N 86°06′26″W	Holland	
11	Holland Harbor Lighthouse	Holland Harbor Lighthouse	July 20, 1978 (#78001509)	South Pier, Holland Harbor; 42°46′22″N 86°12′44″W	Holland	
12	Holland Historic District	Holland Historic District	May 12, 1983 (#83000889)	11th, 12th, 13th Sts., and Washington, Maple, and Pine Aves.; also roughly bounded by River Ave., Pine Ave., 16th St., 14th St., Columbia Ave., 13th St., Central Ave., and 10th St. 42°47′12″N 86°06′48″W	Holland	Second set of boundaries represents a boundary increase of August 10, 1990
13	Holland Old City Hall and Fire Station	Holland Old City Hall and Fire Station	January 11, 1985 (#85000063)	108 E. 8th St. 42°47′24″N 86°06′08″W	Holland	
14	Holland Reformed Protestant Dutch Church	Holland Reformed Protestant Dutch Church	August 23, 1990 (#90001243)	57 E. 10th St. 42°47′20″N 86°06′17″W	Holland	Also known as the Pillar Church
15	Hudsonville Christian School	Hudsonville Christian School	March 27, 2008 (#08000224)	5692 School Ave. 42°52′20″N 85°51′53″W	Hudsonville	
16	Lakewood Farm	Lakewood Farm	November 25, 2020 (#100005825)	264 Lakeshore Ave; 42°48′18″N 86°12′35″W	Holland	
17	Thomas and Anna Morrissey House	Thomas and Anna Morrissey House	March 29, 1999 (#99000337)	190 W. 9th St. 42°47′21″N 86°06′58″W	Holland	
18	Olive Township District No. 1 School	Olive Township District No. 1 School	August 14, 1998 (#98001061)	11611 Stanton St. 42°56′11″N 86°04′21″W	Olive Township	
19	Ottawa Beach Historic District	Ottawa Beach Historic District	April 14, 1995 (#95000451)	Ottawa Beach Rd. 42°46′34″N 86°12′22″W	Park Township	
20	Pere Marquette Railway Locomotive #1223	Pere Marquette Railway Locomotive #1223	December 7, 2000 (#00001490)	Chinook Pier Park, Jackson Ave. 43°04′04″N 86°13′48″W	Grand Haven	
21	Piers and Revetments at Grand Haven, Michigan	Piers and Revetments at Grand Haven, Michigan	October 23, 1995 (#95001161)	Mouth of Grand R. 43°03′32″N 86°15′22″W	Grand Haven	
22	Nathaniel and Esther (Savidge) Robbins House	Nathaniel and Esther (Savidge) Robbins House	April 16, 2009 (#09000203)	20 S. 5th Ave. 43°03′45″N 86°13′35″W	Grand Haven	
23	Spoonville Site	Spoonville Site	March 30, 1973 (#73002158)	Crockery Creek and Grand River; 43°02′40″N 86°04′30″W	Crockery Township	
24	Third Reformed Church of Holland	Third Reformed Church of Holland	April 16, 1971 (#71000418)	110 W. 12th St. 42°47′07″N 86°06′45″W	Holland	
25	Benjamin Van Raalte House	Benjamin Van Raalte House	December 4, 1989 (#89000790)	1076 Sixteenth St. 42°46′53″N 86°03′43″W	Holland	
26	Washington Square Historic District	Washington Square Historic District	January 26, 2026 (#100012619)	Washington Ave. between West 18th St. and West 19th St. 42°46′51″N 86°07′01″W	Zeeland	
27	Zeeland Record Company Building		January 8, 2026 (#100012502)	16 South Elm St. 42°48′43″N 86°01′00″W	Zeeland	

== See also ==
- List of Michigan State Historic Sites in Ottawa County, Michigan
- List of National Historic Landmarks in Michigan
- National Register of Historic Places listings in Michigan
- Listings in neighboring counties: Allegan, Kent, Muskegon
