= List of Michigan State Historic Sites in Ottawa County =

Location of Ottawa County in Michigan

The following is a list of Michigan State Historic Sites in Ottawa County, Michigan. Sites marked with a dagger (†) are also listed on the National Register of Historic Places in Ottawa County, Michigan.

== Current listings ==
Name	Image	Location	City	Listing date
Aloys Bilz House†		107 South Division Street	Spring Lake	April 10, 1986
Black Lake Indian Village		Waukazoo Drive, north shore of Lake Macatawa	Holland vicinity	June 11, 1965
Blendon Landing Commemorative Designation	Blendon Landing	Reister Avenue, at the Grand River (west side)	Blendon Township	April 19, 1990
Garrit A. Bottje House		420 Clinton	Grand Haven	October 11, 1990
Isaac Cappon House†		228 West 9th Street	Holland	November 30, 1983
Central Avenue Christian Reformed Church Informational Designation		1 Graves Place, NW corner of Graves Place and Central Avenue	Holland	August 23, 1990
Central Schools Informational Site		106 South 6th Street	Grand Haven	April 20, 1989
Central Park Chapel	Central Park Chapel	550 Grove Dr.	Holland	September 12, 2006
United States Coast Guard Cutter Escanaba Informational Designation		Escanaba Park, Harbor Drive between Y Drive and Sand Street, adjacent to the USCG Station	Grand Haven	June 20, 1991
Coatsworth House		236 W Ninth Street	Holland	September 8, 1982
P. Henry De Pree House		360 E Central Avenue	Zeeland	December 20, 1989
DeWitt Bicentennial One-Room School		17710 West Taft Street, just west of Grand Haven Road	Spring Lake Township	January 29, 1979
Drenthe Christian Reformed Church		6344 Adams Street	Drenthe	March 16, 1981
Dutch in Michigan Informational Designation		Centennial Park, bounded by River Avenue, 10th Street, Central Avenue, and 12th Street	Holland	
Edward P. Ferry House†		514 Lafayette Street	Grand Haven	September 29, 1972
First Church of Holland Settlers Informational Designation		Pilgrim Home Cemetery, East 16th Street	Holland	August 23, 1956
First Reformed Church		148 East Central Avenue	Zeeland	May 14, 1975
First United Methodist Church Informational Designation		57 West 10th Street	Holland	October 23, 1986
Grand Haven Informational Designation		M-31, Rix Robinson Park, near the Grand Isle Marina	Grand Haven	March 1, 1968
Grand Trunk Railroad Depot		1 Harbor Avenue	Grand Haven	February 27, 1980
Henry Griffin Drug Store		525 Elliott	Grand Haven	March 16, 1989
Highland Park Summer Resort Informational Site		Highland Drive	Grand Haven	April 10, 1986
Holland Harbor Lighthouse† / Holland Harbor		South Pier, Holland Harbor, Holland State Park	Holland vicinity	January 16, 1976
Holland Old City Hall and Fire Station†		106 Eighth Street	Holland	November 7, 1977
Holland Post Office		3110th Street	Holland	July 17, 1997
Hope Church		77 West 11th Street	Holland	April 20, 1989
Hope College Informational Designation		Hope College Campus, 12th Street and College Avenue	Holland	January 16, 1962
Interurban Depot†		363 West Main Street	Coopersville	April 14, 1972
Jenison Museum		28 Port Sheldon Drive	Jenison	June 16, 1972
Khardomah Lodge / Susan Hill Yerkes Informational Designation		1365 Lake Avenue	Grand Haven	May 10, 1990
Jacobus Klanderman Farmstead		6091 96th Avenue	Borculo	September 25, 1985
Hiram B. Knowlton House		11080 Sixty-eighth Street	Allendale	October 17, 1996
Marigold Lodge†		1116 Marigold Avenue	Holland vicinity	June 23, 1983
Michigan Chick Center Informational Designation		NE Corner of Central Ave. and Church St.	Zeeland	September 1, 2010
Thomas McCambridge House		214 North Second Street	Grand Haven	May 18, 1989
Thomas and Anna Morrissey House†		1909th Street	Holland	March 18, 1982
The Netherlands Museum		8 E 12th Street	Holland	July 26, 1978
New Groningen / Jan Rabbers Informational Designation		10542 Chicago Drive	Zeeland	2001
New Groningen Cemetery / Groningen Informational Designation		106th Avenue between Perry Street and Paw Paw Drive	Holland	April 12, 2001
Ninth Street Christian Reformed Church† (also known as the Pillar Church)		57 E. Tenth Street, College Avenue between Ninth and Tenth streets	Holland	February 15, 1958
Noordeloos / Noordeloos Christian Reformed Church	Noordeloos Christian Reformed Church	4075 112th Avenue	Holland	April 19, 1990
Olive Township District No. 1 School†		11611 Stanton Street	West Olive	July 13, 2000
Ottawa County Community Haven	Ottawa County Community Haven	1709 Leonard Road	Eastmanville	August 3, 1979
Port Sheldon Informational Designation		Pigeon Lake, eight miles north of Holland	Holland vicinity	September 25, 1956
Nathanial Robbins House†		20 S Fifth Street	Grand Haven	April 19, 1990
Second Reformed Church of Jamestown		2340 Riley Street; building lost to fire in 1999	Jamestown	May 19, 1988
Smith Bayou		Bayou off Spring Lake in Ferrysburg	Ferrysburg	August 13, 2021
South Olive Christian Reformed Church		6200 120th Avenue	Holland vicinity	June 15, 1984
Third Reformed Church of Holland†		110 West 12th Street	Holland	December 8, 1967
Benjamin Van Raalte House†		1076 East 16th Street	Holland	February 15, 1990
Veneklasen Brick Company / Veneklasen Brick Informational Designation	Veneklasen Brick Co	10300 Paw Paw Drirve	Zeeland	August 26, 2009
Van Vleck Hall		Hope College Campus	Holland	August 6, 1976
Dr. Arend Vander Veen House		508 Washington Avenue	Grand Haven	September 29, 1972
Vriesland Reformed Church		6641 Byron Road, NW corner of 64th Avenue	Vriesland	December 14, 1976
Waukazoo Woods Informational Designation		Southwest corner of Post Avenue and Waukazoo Drive	Holland vicinity	April 23, 1985
West Michigan Furniture Company Building		195 West Eighth Street	Holland	November 21, 1991
Western Theological Seminary		86 East Twelfth Street, SE corner of College Avenue	Holland	March 9, 1966
Woman's Literary Club		235 Central Avenue	Holland	June 21, 1990
Zeeland City Cemetery		Lincoln and Church Streets	Zeeland	June 29, 2000
Zeeland Colonists/Founding of Zeeland		Zeeland Township (T5N, R14W)	Zeeland	February 17, 1965

== See also ==
- National Register of Historic Places listings in Ottawa County, Michigan

== Sources ==
- Historic Sites Online – Ottawa County. Michigan State Housing Developmental Authority. Accessed May 29, 2011.
