= Holland Historic District =

Holland Historic District may refer to:

- Holland Historic District (Holland, Michigan), listed on the NRHP in Ottawa County, Michigan
- Holland Downtown Historic District, Holland, Michigan, listed on the NRHP in Ottawa County, Michigan
- Holland Patent Stone Churches Historic District, Holland Patent, New York, NRHP-listed
- Holland Historic District (Suffolk, Virginia), NRHP-listed
