= Albert H. McGeehan =

American politician (born 1944)

Mayor of Holland, Michigan
- In office 1993–2009

Personal details
- Party: Republican

Albert H. McGeehan (born October 1944), was mayor of Holland, Michigan from 1993–2009. He earned the rank of Eagle Scout and was awarded the Distinguished Eagle Scout Award in 2009. He was born on Staten Island and grew up in Edison and Metuchen, NJ, and then moved to Holland to attend Hope College and graduated in 1966. He was known as "Mayor Al". McGeehan was succeeded by Kurt Dykstra, another Republican, as mayor of Holland.
