= Grand Rapids, Grand Haven and Muskegon Railway =

Electric interurban railway in Michigan

Grand Rapids, Grand Haven & Muskegon Railway
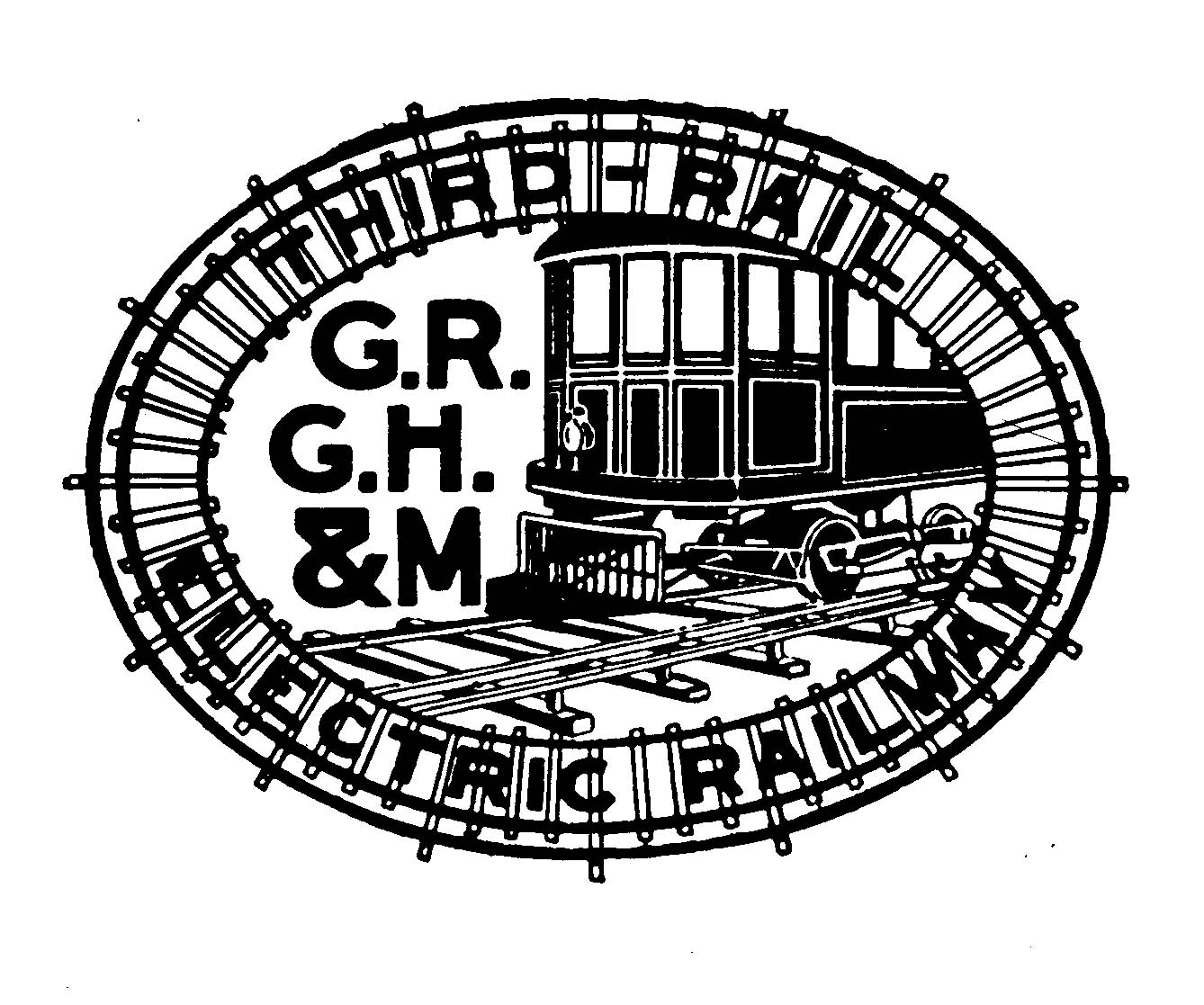

Overview
- Headquarters: Grand Rapids, MI
- Locale: Michigan
- Dates of operation: 1902–1928

Technical
- Track gauge: 4 ft 8 1/2 in (1,435 mm) standard gauge

Map from GRHG&M Brochure

The Grand Rapids, Grand Haven and Muskegon Railway was an electric interurban railway that operated in west Michigan from 1902 until 1928.

== Early history ==
The line was built and operated by Westinghouse, Church, Kerr & Company, who organized the company with local promoters. The Westinghouse group was a subsidiary of the Westinghouse Electric & Manufacturing Company. In addition to the GRGH&M, Westinghouse, Church Kerr and Co. owned the Lackawanna and Wyoming Valley Railroad and was building that line at the same time. In September 1902, the company was granted franchise to build and operate in Michigan and to purchase the Grand Haven Railway to access Lake Michigan.

The GRGH&M operated on private right of way between Grand Rapids and Muskegon Heights, Michigan. In the cities of Grand Rapids and Muskegon, the line used the tracks of the local street railway systems. A branch line ran from Grand Haven Junction, just east of Fruitport, Michigan, to Grand Haven, where the line had its port connection. Between cities, cars took electricity from a third rail; in towns and cities, power was received through overhead wires. Power was generated by the Muskegon & Grand Rapids Water Power Co. via a generating station on the Muskegon River.

Although the main purpose of the GRGH&M was carrying passengers and express packages between the major and minor cities on its route, a boat connection between Grand Haven and Chicago was a key feature. The Chicago connection allowed the line build a significant business bringing passengers to West Michigan resorts and fresh produce to Chicago markets.

== The United Light & Railways years ==
Rumors surfaced in 1911 that the railway was in talks with the Clark syndicate of Philadelphia surrounding a lease of the line; however these rumors were denied by Wallace Franklin, then secretary-treasurer of the company, although at the same time he verified "that our line may be sold very soon" to another party. In 1912, Westinghouse, Church Kerr & Co. sold the line to the United Light and Railways Company (UL&R), a Grand Rapids utilities holding company. Under UL&R ownership, traffic continued to grow through the 1910s.

By 1920, the business environment was beginning to change. Private automobiles and paved highways were poised to cut into both passenger and freight traffic. And operating costs, which rose rapidly during WW I threatened to squeeze profits. Still, the "Lake Line", as the GRGH&M was called, managed to remain profitable during the early 1920s. Of all the operating interurban lines in Michigan, the GRGH&M, was the only one not in the hands of a receiver in 1925.

== The decline and end ==
After 1925, the fortunes of the GRGH&M changed quickly. Ridership declined dramatically, and profits plunged. United Light and Power transferred ownership once again, spinning the company off to a group of local managers. There was little the new owners could do. With insufficient funds on hand to pay the bondholders, the Grand Rapids, Grand Haven and Muskegon filed for bankruptcy protection in July 1926. Cars continued to run on a reduced schedule until April 18, 1928, when the line was officially abandoned, and the passenger services were replaced by Greyhound Lines buses.

One of the railway's original substations, the Coopersville station, and a passenger car have been preserved by the Coopersville Area Historical Museum in Coopersville, Michigan.
