= Grand Haven Historic District =

Historic district in Michigan, United States

- U.S. National Register of Historic Places
- U.S. Historic district
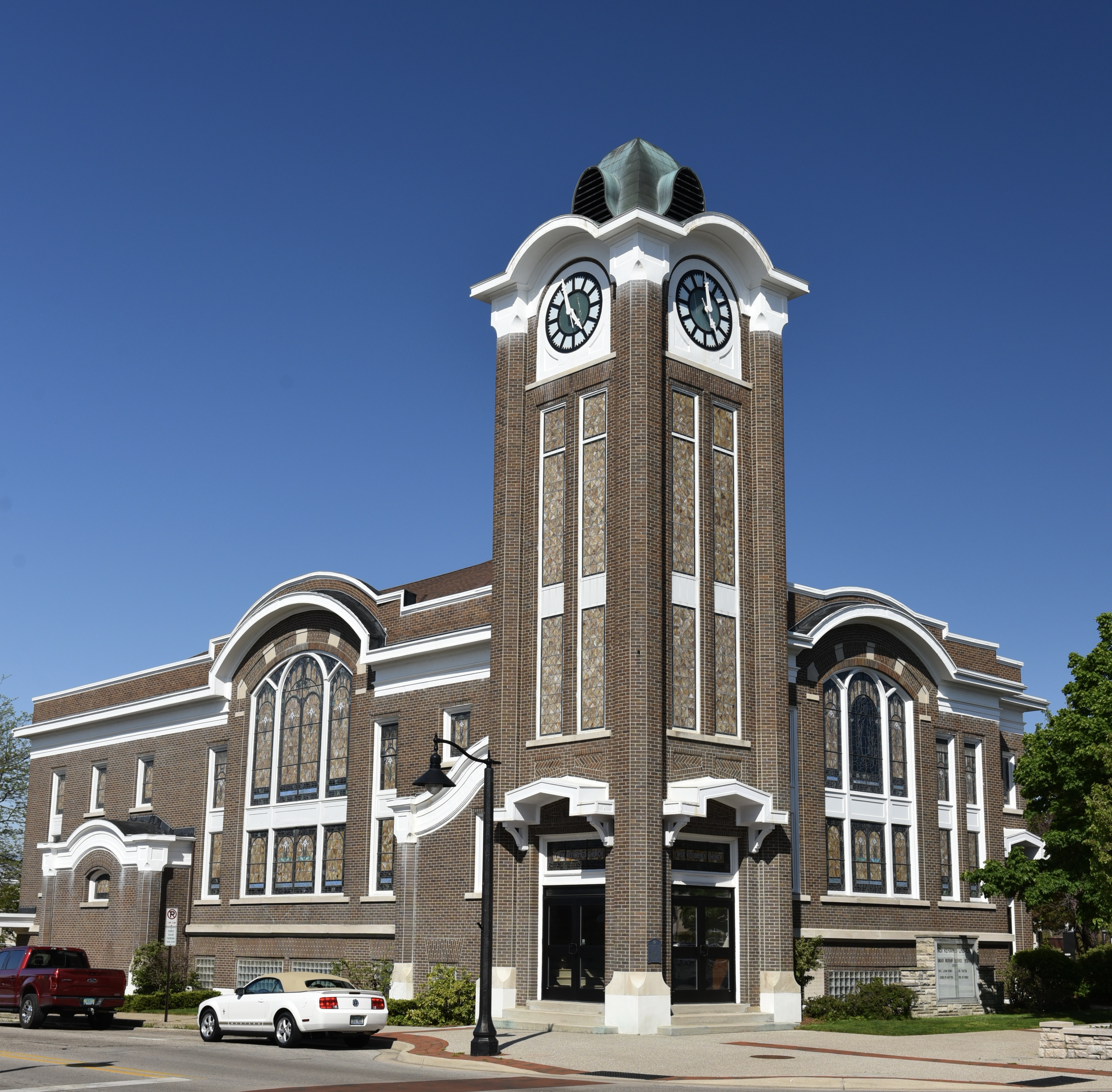
- First Reformed Church

- Location within Michigan Location within the United States
- Interactive map
- Location: Washington Ave, adjacent Sts Harbor Dr. through 600 blocks, Grand Haven, Michigan
- Coordinates: 43°3′53″N 86°14′1″W
- Architect: William G. Robinson, Frederick S. Robinson, Robinson & Campau, Christian W. Brandt, Harold D. Ilgenfritz, William M. Clarke, Pierre Lindhout, Smith, Hinchman & Grylls, Daverman Associates, Sidney J. Osgood, William A. Stone, Jr., William H. McCarty, Stone & Parent, Harold H. Fisher & Associates
- Architectural style: Late Victorian, Romanesque Revival, Italianate, Queen Anne
- NRHP reference No.: 16000584
- Added to NRHP: September 6, 2016

The Grand Haven Historic District is a mixed commercial and residential historic district located along Washington Avenue and adjacent Streets from Harbor Drive through the 600 block, in Grand Haven, Michigan. The district was listed on the National Register of Historic Places in 2016.

== History ==
A fur trading depot was established at what is now Grand Haven in 1825; actual settlement was initiated in 1835 when Rev. William M. Ferry arrived and a sawmill was established at the site. One building in the district, the Sidney Williams House at 225 Franklin, likely dates from this first era of settlement in the late 1830s. As the lumber trade heated up, the settlement increased in size, and by 1851 was large enough to support a newspaper. The commercial center of the city quickly developed along Washington Avenue, starting from the harbor and working outward. Fires in 1853 and again in 1866 destroyed much of the downtown, and in 1877 the city passed a fire limit ordinance prohibiting buildings of wood construction in the heart of the downtown. A handful of private houses, built along the fringes of the downtown, date from the late 1850s and 1860s. The earliest extant commercial building in the district is the building at 135 Washington, constructed about 1868.

By the 1880s, the lumber boom was nearly over, but fruit growing and commercial shipping took its place. More buildings were constructed in the downtown area, primarily in brick. As the end of the century neared, the building boom tapered off, in part due to the loss of local lumbering jobs, and in part due to the depressed national economy. In the early 20th century, the city's efforts at economic diversification paid off, with more manufacturing jobs coming into the city, and, with the establishment of a car ferry port, an increase in shipping and shipping-related trade. As a result, more buildings were constructed in the district in the first decade of the 20th century than in any other ten-year period.

The city's population, and the number of buildings in the district, continued to grow through the 1920s and 1930s. The rise of the automobile, and the associated tourism, also helped boost the city's economy. The Great Depression affected Grand Haven less than most cities in the nation, but still the pace of growth in the historic district slowed. Grand Haven continued its growth after World War II. A number of structures built in this period were infill, replacing older buildings which had been demolished. In more modern times, Grand Haven has established itself as a vacation destination, and its downtown adds to the attraction of the city. The construction of infill buildings has continued, although recent structures have tended to be larger in scale, and not blending in with the earlier buildings.

== Description ==
The Grand Haven Historic District extends along six blocks of Washington Street, the city's primary business district. The district extends along adjacent streets to include the city hall, former police and fire department building, church buildings, and multiple substantial buildings constructed as residences, although many of these have been converted to commercial use. It also includes the large Story & Clark Piano Company complex, as well as early frame commercial buildings along Third Street.

The district contains a total of 121 buildings, mostly two stories in height. The buildings date from c. 1840 to about 1965, but most were constructed in the late nineteenth and early twentieth centuries. The city's Central Park is also within the district. Eighty-five of these properties, including the park, contribute to the historic nature of the district. The district contains substantially Late Victorian commercial blocks, but also a Period Revival movie theater, a Neoclassical former bank building, Italianate, Queen Anne houses, and International style and Mid-Century Modern structures. Significant architect-designed buildings within the district include:

- Nathaniel Robbins House (1899) This house at 20 South 5th Street was built by Baltus Pellegrom, a ship's carpenter, for Nathaniel and Esther Robbins. Robbins was a successful area businessman.
- Willard C. Shelden House (1893) This imposing house at 321 Washington is the finest Queen Anne house in the city. It was designed by architect William G. Robinson of Grand Rapids for Willard C. Shelden, the proprietor of Sheldon's Magnetic Mineral Springs spa.
- First Reformed Church (1913) This church at 301 Washington was designed by architect Pierre Lindhout. It has an eclectic style, combining elements of Neoclassic architecture in a non-traditional way, resulting in an overall effect that reflects an Arts and Crafts influence.
- Grand Theater lobby (1927) This theatre at 22 Washington was designed by Christian W. Brandt and Harold D. Ilgenfritz. Although the main section of the theatre itself was razed in 2004, the street facade and lobby were retained.
- Michigan Bell Telephone Building (1928) This building at 501 Washington was designed by Smith, Hinchman & Grylls. It is a three-story Colonial building constructed of concrete block and clad with brick. The roof is flat, and the three bays at street level have broad gauged brick arches with masonry keystones.
- City Hall (1934) This building at 519 Washington was designed by Robinson and Campau. It is a two-story Colonial building with a cross-gable roof. The main facade is symmetrical and seven bays wide, and contains a projecting front-gabled entry bay with a limestone portico.
- Police and Fire Department Building (1935) This building at 18-20 North Fifth was also designed by Robinson and Campau. The original portion of the building is a 1-1/2-story rectangular plan gable-roof brick Colonial Revival building with a slate roof. A flat-roofed addition was constructed in 1975.
- First Presbyterian Church (1954) This church at 508 Franklin was designed by Harold H. Fisher & Associates. It is an orange buff-colored brick structure trimmed with limestone with a low gable roof.
