= Pigeon River (Ottawa County, Michigan) =

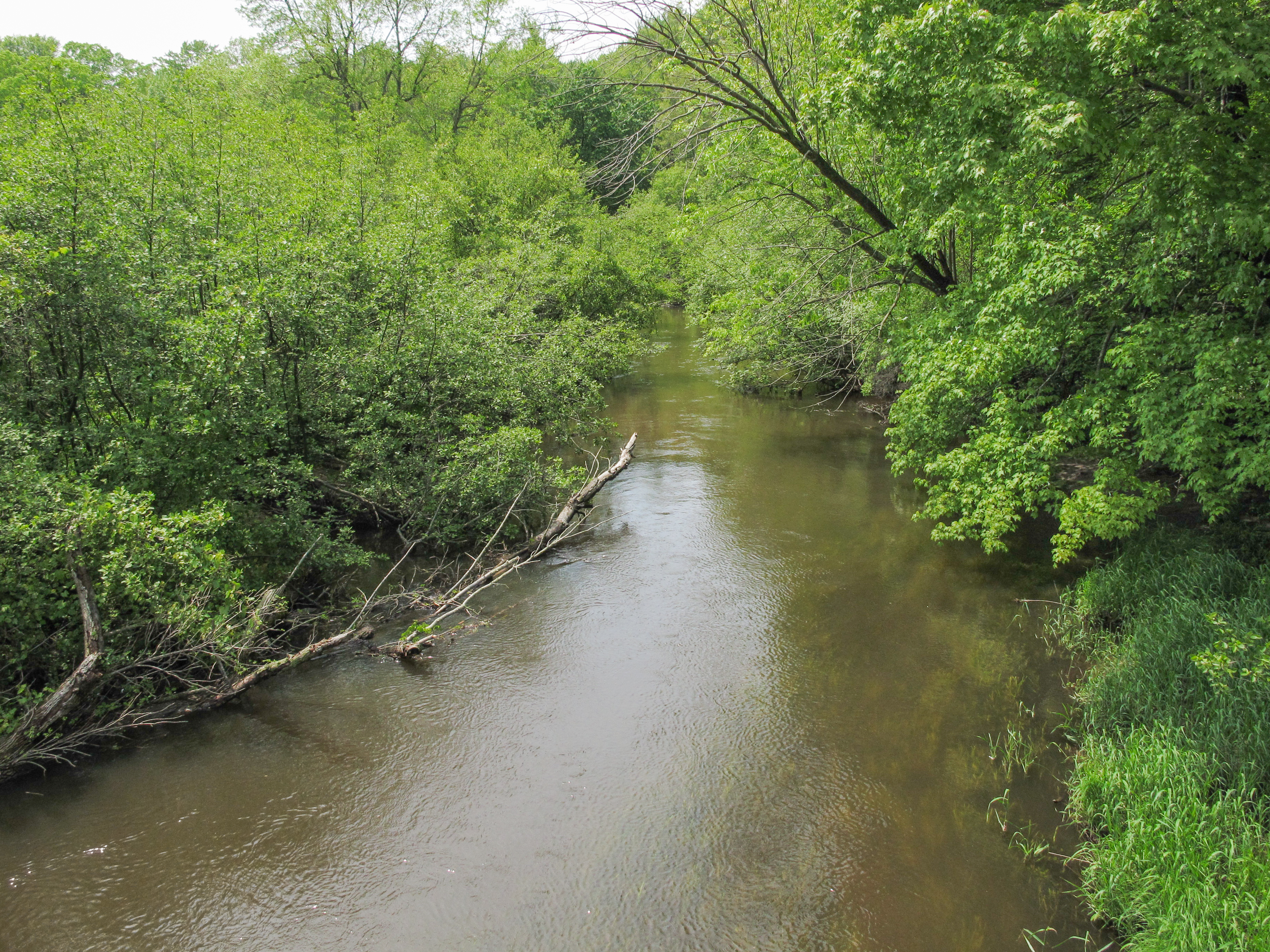
- The Pigeon River in Hemlock Crossing Park in Port Sheldon Township

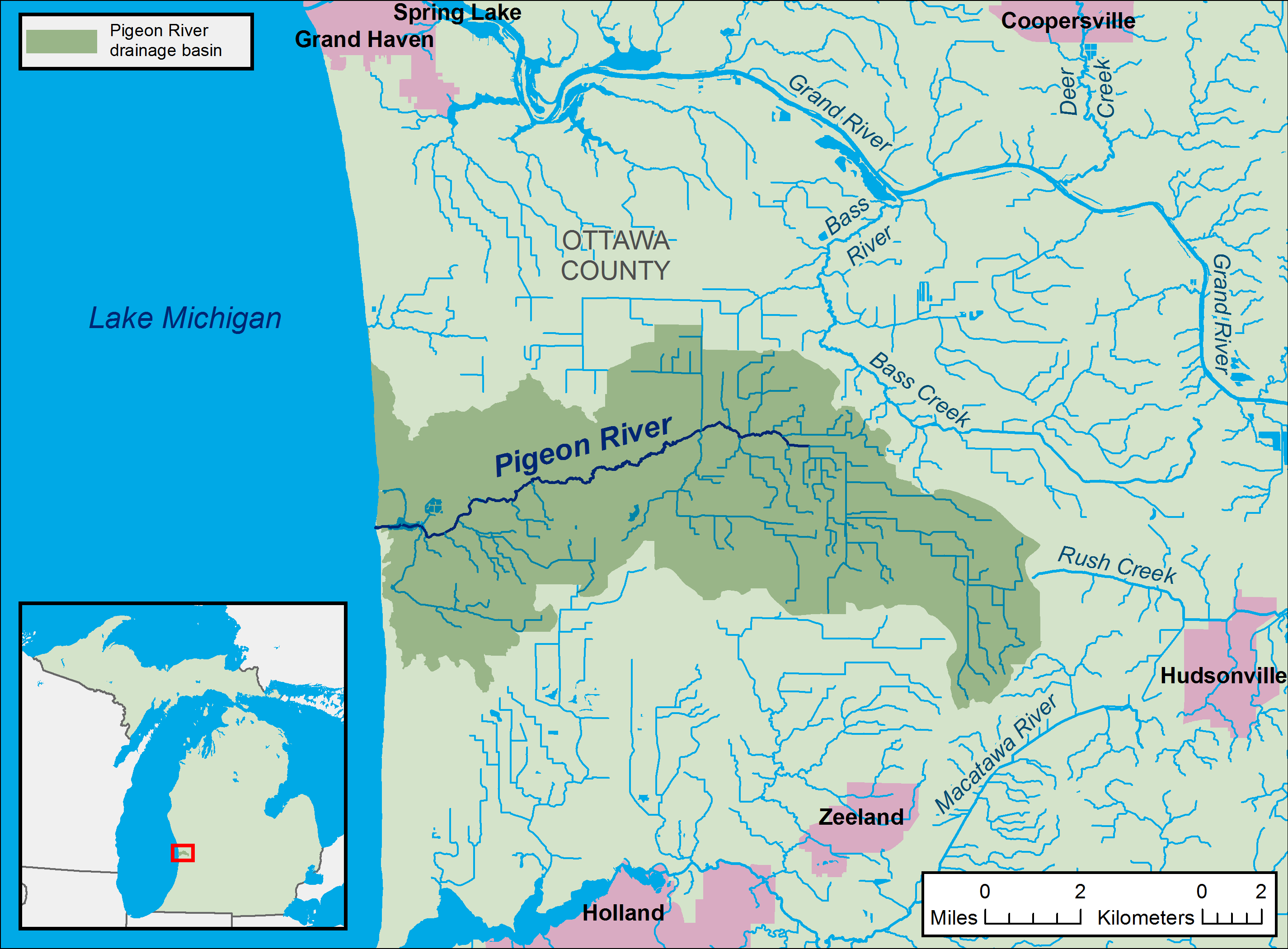
- A map of the Pigeon River and its watershed.

Location
- Country: United States
- State: Michigan
- County: Ottawa
- Townships: Olive, Port Sheldon

Physical characteristics
- Source
  - location: Olive Township
  - coordinates: 42.9191895°N 86.044766°W
  - elevation: 625 ft (191 m)
- Mouth: Lake Michigan
  - location: Port Sheldon Township
  - coordinates: 42.9011315°N 86.2153253°W
  - elevation: 581 ft (177 m)
- Length: 12.9 miles (20.8 km)
- Basin size: 61.7 mi^{2} (160 km^{2})
- Discharge
  - location: mouth
  - average: 64.53 cu ft/s (1.827 m^{3}/s) (estimate)

Basin features
- Progression: Lake Michigan—Lake Huron—St. Clair—Lake St. Clair—Detroit—Lake Erie—Niagara—Lake Ontario—St. Lawrence—Atlantic Ocean
- Tributaries
  - left: Sawyer Creek, Ten Hagen Creek
- Waterbodies: Pigeon Lake
- Hydrologic Unit Codes: 040500020302, 040500020303 (USGS)

The Pigeon River is a small river flowing to Lake Michigan on the western Lower Peninsula of the U.S. state of Michigan. The river is approximately 12.9 miles (20.8 km) long (Note: The 12.9 miles (20.8 km) figure is from the National Hydrography Dataset. The length is given as 11.8 miles (19.0 km) in the 1997 Pigeon River Watershed Project, Ottawa County, Michigan: Comprehensive Nonpoint Source Watershed Management Plan.) and drains an area of 61.7 square miles (160 km^{2}) (Note: The 61.7 square miles (160 km^{2}) figure is from the National Hydrographic Dataset, a sum of the areas of subwatersheds 040500020302 and 040500020303. The figure is given as 64.7 square miles (168 km^{2}) in the 1997 Pigeon River Watershed Project, Ottawa County, Michigan: Comprehensive Nonpoint Source Watershed Management Plan.) in a generally rural area situated between the cities of Holland and Grand Haven. Via Lake Michigan and the larger Great Lakes system, it is part of the watershed of the St. Lawrence River.

== Course ==
The Pigeon River's watershed and course are located entirely in western Ottawa County. The river is formed by a confluence of agricultural drainage ditches in Olive Township and flows generally west-southwestward into Port Sheldon Township. After flowing through Pigeon Lake, which is the only lake in the river's watershed, it flows into Lake Michigan in Port Sheldon Township, approximately 9.5 miles (15.3 km) northwest of Holland and 11.3 miles (18.2 km) south of Grand Haven.

Two county-operated public parks, Pigeon Creek Park and Hemlock Crossing, are located along the lower course of the river. The river has been stocked annually with brown trout by the Michigan Department of Natural Resources since 2003.

== Watershed characteristics ==
The Pigeon River watershed is located in portions of seven townships of Ottawa County: (Note: Figures reflect the 1997 watershed management plan's calculation of the watershed size as 64.7 square miles (168 km^{2}).)

Township	Area of township in watershed	Percentage of watershed in township
Blendon	13.3 square miles (34 km^{2})	20.5%
Grand Haven	1 square mile (2.6 km^{2})	1.5%
Olive	24.2 square miles (63 km^{2})	37.4%
Park	1.2 square miles (3.1 km^{2})	1.9%
Port Sheldon	17.9 square miles (46 km^{2})	27.7%
Robinson	6.8 square miles (18 km^{2})	10.5%
Zeeland	0.3 square miles (0.78 km^{2})	0.5%

Formerly covered by forests and wetlands including a black ash swamp that covered 75% of the watershed, by the 1920s most of the watershed had been cleared and drained for agriculture. Portions of the watershed were reforested in the 1940s to control wind erosion. A 1997 watershed management plan found that approximately half of the land in the Pigeon River watershed was used for agriculture, with most of this area in Blendon, Olive, and Robinson townships. Agricultural production in the watershed included ornamental nursery crops, Christmas tree, blueberries, upland vegetables, field crops, turkeys, poultry eggs, beef and dairy cattle, and hogs.

Land use in the watershed as of 1992 was as follows: (Note: Figures reflect the 1997 watershed management plan's calculation of the watershed size as 64.7 square miles (168 km^{2}).)

Land use	Percentage	Area
Agriculture	49%	31.7 square miles (82 km^{2})
Forest	36%	23.3 square miles (60 km^{2})
Rural residential	5%	3.2 square miles (8.3 km^{2})
Wetland	1%	0.6 square miles (1.6 km^{2})
Other uses	9%	5.8 square miles (15 km^{2})

== Tributaries ==
This is a list of named streams in the Pigeon River watershed (aside from the Pigeon River itself), as identified by the National Hydrography Dataset. The list's default order is from the mouth of the river to its source. (Note: A more extensive list of named county drains (agricultural ditches) in the watershed is provided in the 1997 Pigeon River Watershed Project, Ottawa County, Michigan: Comprehensive Nonpoint Source Watershed Management Plan.)

	Name	Flows into	Length
1	Ten Hagen Creek	Pigeon River	5.5 miles (8.9 km)
2	Sawyer Creek	Pigeon River	1.8 miles (2.9 km)
3	Owens and Sawyer Drain	unnamed tributary of Sawyer Creek	1.8 miles (2.9 km)
4	Walters Drain	Pigeon River	2.7 miles (4.3 km)
5	Blendon and Olive Drain	Sycamore Creek	2.3 miles (3.7 km)

== See also ==
- List of rivers of Michigan
