= Lakewood Farm =

- U.S. National Register of Historic Places
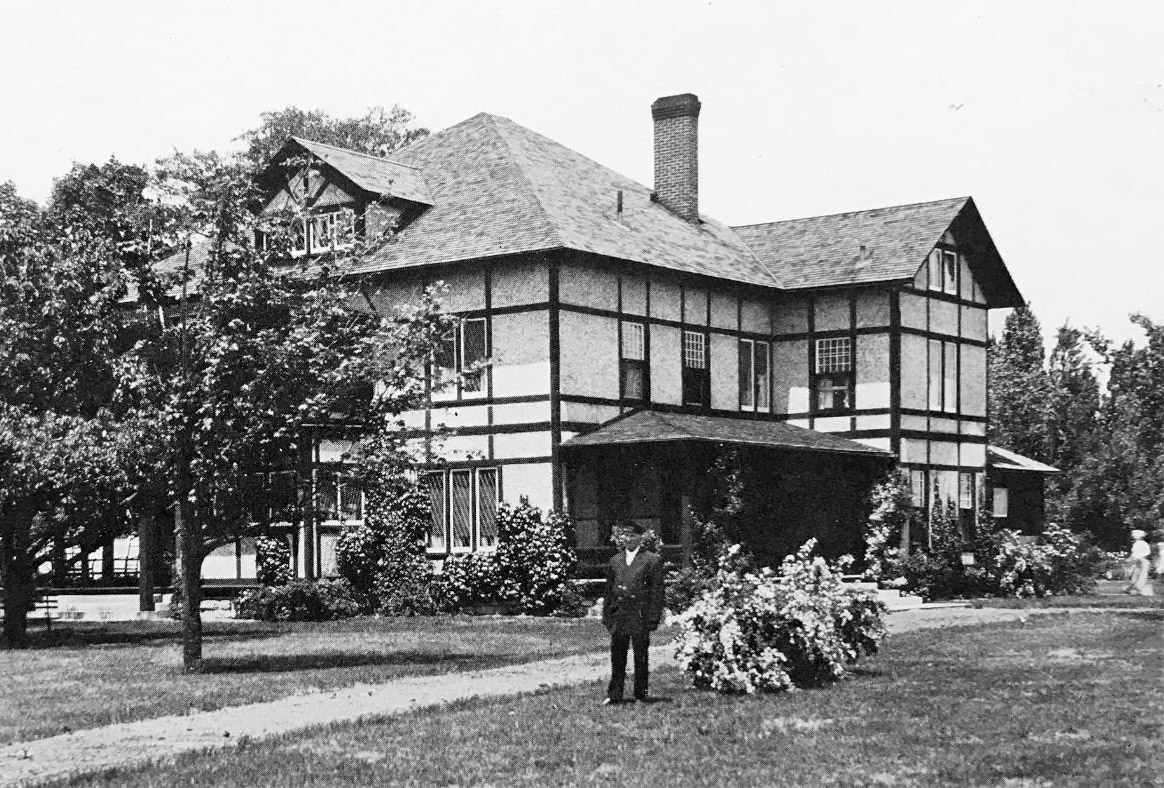
- Lakewood Farm main house, 1910

- Location within Michigan Location within the United States
- Interactive map
- Location: 264 Lakeshore Ave, Holland, Michigan
- Coordinates: 42°48′18″N 86°12′35″W
- Area: 4.23 acres (1.71 ha)
- Built: 1903
- Built by: Boomers and Smengee
- Architectural style: Western Stick Style
- NRHP reference No.: 100005825
- Added to NRHP: November 25, 2020

Lakewood Farm, also known as the Getz Zoo, Getz Farm, or Lakewood Zoo, includes a house and outbuildings located at 264 Lakeshore Avenue in Holland, Michigan. The property was placed on the National Register of Historic Places in 2020.

== History ==
In 1902, Ida Florence Fay of Chicago purchased 71 acres along Lake Michigan, which included this property. She constructed a mansion overlooking the lake in 1903, and began planting fruit trees. She named the property the "Lakewood Farm." She lived at the farm until 1910, when she listed it for sale.

In August 1910, George Fulmer Getz, the owner of Chicago-based Globe Coal Company, purchased Lakewood Farm and the mansion built by Fay. He was a self-made millionaire, and he and his wife were looking for a location to build a summer home. However, they chose the Lakewood property with its already extant house.

Contemporary newspaper articles during Getz's lifetime, articles in the decades following his death, and a self-published book by Holland author Donald van Reeken all state that Getz built Lakewood from barren wasteland. Research for the nomination, conducted by Valerie van Heest, of Lafferty van Heest and Associates in Holland, discovered the inaccuracy.

Weeks after purchasing Lakewood Farm in 1910, Getz's wife Susan died of complications from childbirth. He adjusted to life as a single father, and his plans for the Lakewood property shifted. He purchased adjacent property in 1911, and worked to develop the estate into a working fruit and poultry farm. He purchased more land in 1912 and later years, amassing a total of 250 acres. He grew the poultry-producing capabilities of the farm, and began collecting exotic animals as a personal passion. He also began supporting the local county agricultural fair, through exhibiting his farm products there and funding a new agricultural pavilion. In 1912, he brought two camels, as well as other exotic animals, to display at the fair, which helped raise visitation and prompted locals to begin visiting Lakewood Farm at other times of the year. Getz welcomed the general public to his property.

Getz continued to develop his property, constructing a number of outbuildings and improving the roads and other infrastructure. When the United States entered World War I, however, he downsized and concentrated on producing food for the troops. After the war, he began shifting responsibilities to his business subordinates. In 1921, Getz held a Fourth of July celebration at Lakewood, with over 5000 attendees. He also began collecting more animals, including many exotic ones. Soon he had an elephant, orangutan, lions, ocelots, tigers, panthers, leopards, jaguars, kangaroos, bears, and pythons, among others. His personal menagerie became one of the largest in the country.

In August 1926, Getz held a political rally for Fred W. Green, then running for governor of Michigan. He opened his menagerie to thirty thousand people for the "Green Barbeque," as it became known. The event garnered nationwide attraction, and for the first time in print, Getz's menagerie was referred to as a "zoo." He embraced the concept and continued to welcome growing numbers of visitors. Before the end of 1926, some 800,000 people visited the zoo. Over the next two years, Getz developed the farm and its zoo as a visitor attraction.

The Great Depression affected Getz's personal fortune, and in 1931 he started looking to sell the property. He kept the zoo open, but began charging admission. This was not sustainable, and he closed the zoo in 1934, shipping the animals to the Brookfield Zoo in Chicago.

In 1938, Getz died of pneumonia. After his death, the farm was parceled out. The mansion itself did not sell until 1945 to local car dealer William Vandenberg and his wife, Esther. Soon thereafter, the couple divorced, and Esther lived in the house until her death in 2004. She did little work to the property over the almost half century she lived there. In 2006, Patti and Ken Bing purchased the 4.23-acre property. The Bings did a major restoration of the 10,000-square-foot residence and guest house as well as the grounds, restoring it to the style and character of the property during the years that it was owned by Getz.

== Description ==
Lakewood Farm is situated on a 4.23-acre parcel of lakefront property, and includes three architecturally significant buildings, the private mansion, garage, and guest house, as well as various other outbuildings. Although the property represents less than two percent of the 250-acre farm and zoo that Getz operated from 1910 to 1938, it represents the whole of Lakewood Farm because it encompasses three of the farm’s largest and most well-crafted buildings. It includes both the residential portion of the property as well as the heart of the public gathering space that radiated from a central stone fountain. This parcel therefore serves as a reminder of the farm and zoo that disappeared after the land was divided and sold as 174 different parcels after Getz's death in 1938.

The Lakewood Farm mansion is a three-story, modified stick style structure. It includes the square original structure (built in 1903) and later additions from the 1910s and 20s. The additions include a porte cochere, a second floor above the north side kitchen entrance, and a two-story addition on the south side. The roof of the main section is hipped, and three large intersecting gables are over the three additions. A modern garage and breezeway were added in the early 2000s.

The garage is a two-story, modified stick style structure. It served as a garage as well as an office, staff housing, and power plant. The building was constructed in about 1916. It has an asphalt-shingled hip roof with a pair of dormer windows on the east and west sides.

The guest house, also used as an employee dormitory, is a one-story, wood frame, rectangular building with wood and cement board-sided. The original building was constructed in 1903; an east side addition was constructed in 1910. It has an intersecting gable roof covered with asphalt shingles with two dormer windows.

== Historical significance ==
To be listed on the National Register, a property must meet at least one of four specific criteria; Lakewood meets two. It is significant in social history through its direct association with George F. Getz, whose work at Lakewood Farm illuminated a number of important political, social, and philosophical movements taking place during the Progressive Era in the early 20th century, when government and individuals responded to the rapid industrialization in America.

Lakewood Farm is also significant because the architecture of three main buildings, and associated structures and objects, which were built and/or remodeled by Getz. They are striking examples of modern architecture at the turn of the century as the stick style of the late nineteenth century transitioned to the new Arts and Crafts Movement taking place in the early twentieth century.

== Additional information ==
The nonprofit Historic Ottawa Beach Society that operates the Pump House Museum in Holland, Michigan retained the services of Lafferty van Heest and Associates to prepare the National Register nomination on behalf of the Bings, who own the project. The effort is in keeping with its mission to preserve local history. The organization also recovered, relocated, restored, and displayed outside its museum an original 6'-tall, concrete decorative pillar that once marked the beach access at Lakewood Farm. It had fallen from the bluff onto the beach below and was discovered in 2020 during shore revetment work.
