= Olive Township District No. 1 School =

- U.S. National Register of Historic Places
- Michigan State Historic Site
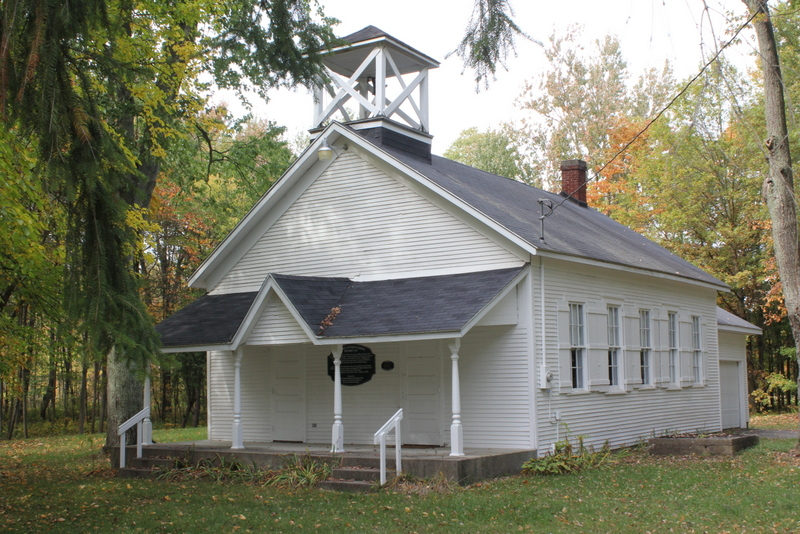

- Location within Michigan Location within the United States
- Interactive map
- Location: 11611 Stanton St., Olive Township, Michigan
- Coordinates: 42°56′11″N 86°4′21″W
- Area: less than one acre
- Built: 1866
- Architectural style: Victorian one-room school
- NRHP reference No.: 98001061
- Added to NRHP: August 14, 1998

The Olive Township District No. 1 School, also known as the Ottawa Station School, is a one-room school located at 11611 Stanton Street in Olive Township, Michigan. It is now a museum operated by the Olive Township Historical Society. It was listed on the National Register of Historic Places in 1998.

== History ==
Olive Township was established in 1857. By 1861, the township had been divided into four school districts, but no school houses had yet been built. At some point over the next five years, a log schoolhouse was constructed for District No. 1, located approximately one mile east of the current location, at what is now the corner of Stanton Street and 108th Avenue. In 1866, work began on this frame schoolhouse to replace the log structure. Construction was completed in 1867.

In the early 1870s, a railroad line which soon became the Chicago and Michigan Lake Shore Railroad was built through the township, and stations were established at various points. In 1872, James Sawyer platted a village named Ottawa Station at this location. Although the village was never very substantial, in 1876 the school district purchased the present site of the school and moved the school to its current location.

In addition to school functions, the building served as a social center for the surrounding residents. The ladies' aid, ice cream socials, and nearly all other community events were held at the school. In addition, non-denominational church services were held here until the early 1900s. In 1887, a belfry was added to the school, and in 1898, a new front porch. The school district continued to use the school until 1958, when the district was absorbed into the Zeeland public school system.

In 1960, the school was sold to a private individual, and in 1994 it was converted to a private residence. In 2011, the schoolhouse was donated to the Olive Township Historical Society, which currently operates it as a museum.

== Description ==
The Olive Township District No. 1 School is a one-story gable-roof one-room school covered with clapboard, measuring 36 feet by 26 feet. It has an open belfry and a turned-column front porch on the front. The front facade has a double-entry door but no windows. Each side contains five square-head double-hung six-over-six windows, of which three are original and two were added in 1935. A rear garage extension was added to the building in 1994/96 during renovation.

On the interior, the interior was a single classroom with a maple floor, vertical tongue-and-groove boarding on the walls up to window sill height, and plastered upper walls and ceiling. Small toilet areas were located in one corner. During renovation, much of the interior finishing was retained, including the blackboards and light fixtures. The toilet area was converted to a single bathroom, and a kitchen and bedroom added.
