= Max and Esther De Pree House =

- U.S. National Register of Historic Places
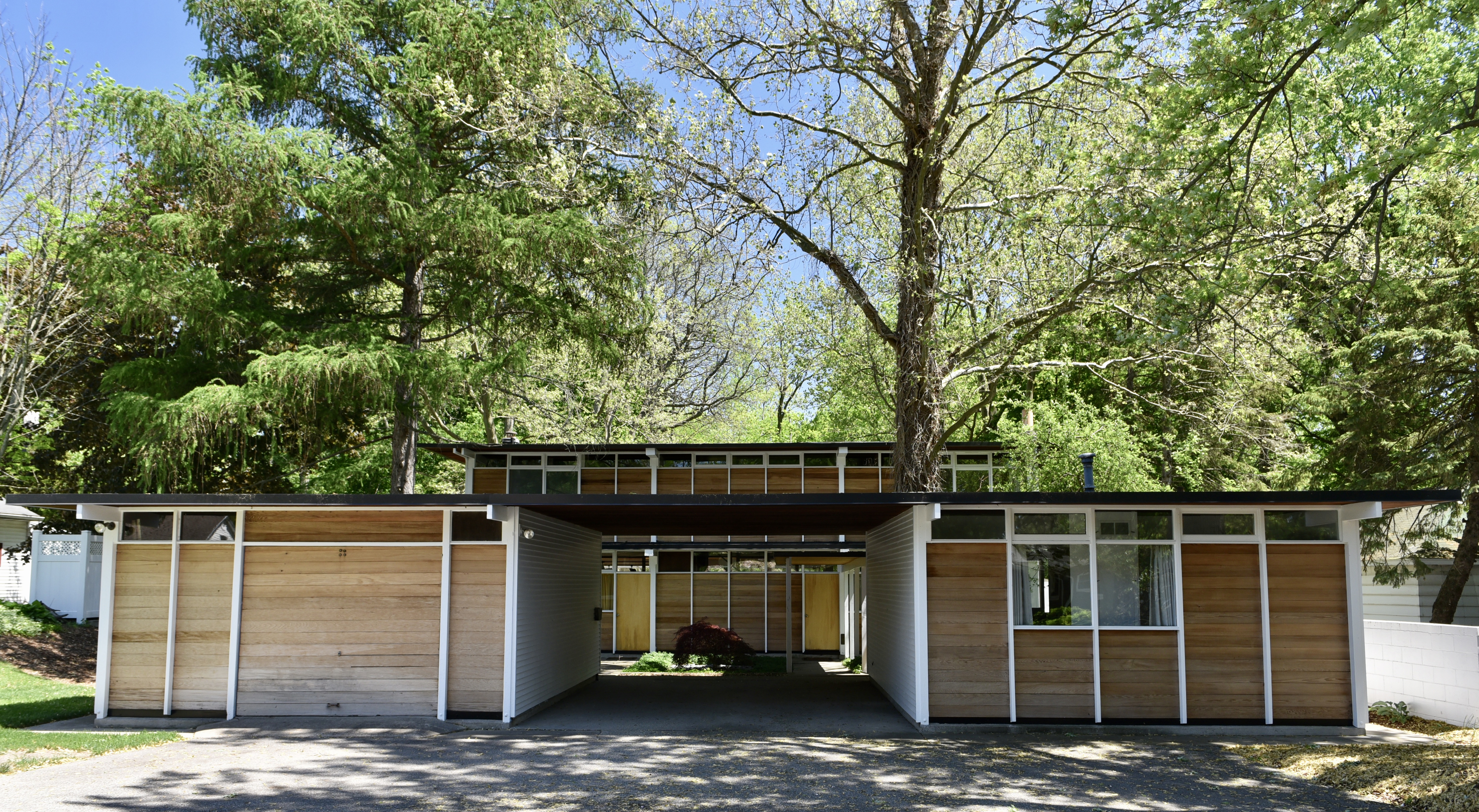

- Location within Michigan Location within the United States
- Interactive map
- Location: 279 S. Division St., Zeeland, Michigan
- Coordinates: 42°48′24″N 86°0′17″W
- Built: 1954
- Architect: Charles Eames
- Architectural style: Modern
- NRHP reference No.: 100000886
- Added to NRHP: April 17, 2017

The Max and Esther De Pree House is a private house located at 279 South Division Street in Zeeland, Michigan. It was listed on the National Register of Historic Places in 2017.

== History ==
Max De Pree is a son of D. J. De Pree, founder of Herman Miller office furniture company. The company had close ties with Charles and Ray Eames, beginning in 1946. In 1953, Max De Pree saw a model house design in the Eames Office in Los Angeles, and asked Eames if he could build it in Michigan. Charles suggested instead he design another house for Max. He designed this house for the De Prees, sited on a small lot next to the house they were living in at the time.

The De Prees lived in the house until 1975, when they sold it to Bob Rynbrandt, a Herman Miller employee. The Rynbrandts lived in the house until 2010, when it was purchased by Herman Miller, Inc., who planned to restore and preserve it.

== Description ==
The Max and Esther De Pree House is a two-story flat-roofed Modern house. The front facade of the house has two symmetrical structures: a single-car garage on one side, a study on the other. A covered walkway between the two leads to the house. The main body of the house is a rectangular structure containing two thousand square feet of space. The exterior has windows arranged to maximize airflow. The house is located on a sloping lot, which looks out into a wooded area leading down to a stream.
