= Hudsonville Christian School Building =

- Hudsonville Christian School
- U.S. National Register of Historic Places
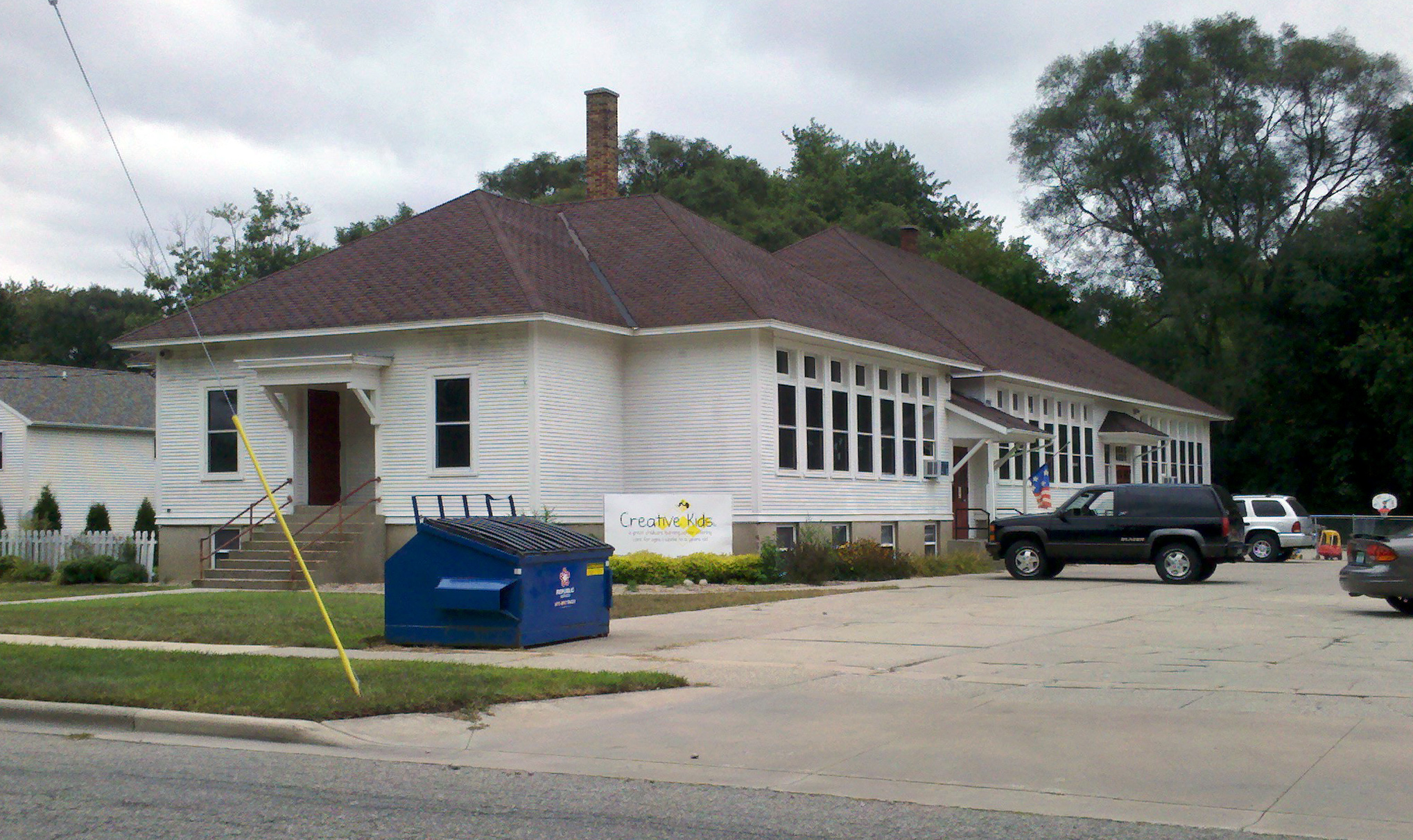

- Location within Michigan Location within the United States
- Interactive map
- Location: 5692 School Ave., Hudsonville, Michigan
- Coordinates: 42°52′20″N 85°51′53″W
- Area: 1 acre (0.40 ha)
- Built: 1917
- Architectural style: Wooden schoolhouse
- NRHP reference No.: 08000224
- Added to NRHP: March 27, 2008

The Hudsonville Christian School Building is a school building located at 5692 School Avenue in Hudsonville, Michigan. It was listed on the National Register of Historic Places in 2008.

== History ==
A small settlement developed at this location in the 1860s. Development was slow until construction of the Chicago and West Michigan Railroad in 1874 brought more settlers, primarily Dutch immigrants. By 1897, over 400 people lived in Hudsonville. Christian Reformed congregants who settled in Hudsonville initially worshipped in the surrounding communities, but in 1901 the Rev. G. G. Haan established the Hudsonville Christian Reformed mission. The congregation built a church in 1904.

In 1913, the congregation established the Hudsonville Society for Christian Instruction. Church members donated a site for the school and construction began in 1917. The original school contained two rooms, but initial enrollment was larger than expected, and a third classroom was conducted in the basement. In 1921 enrollment had increased so much that two additional classrooms were constructed. In 1943, two more classrooms were added. However, enrollment continued to grow, and in the late 1940s, it was decided that the site was too small to continue adding capacity. In 1948, the school purchased another site, and in 1950 constructed a new building.

The original building remained part of the Hudsonville Christian School; although fluctuating enrollment made the school attempt to sell the building in 1968, a spike in 1970 caused the building to again be utilized. In the 1970s and 1980s the building was renovated. It was closed at the end of the 2004/05 school year, although the Hudsonville Christian School continued operation in other buildings. The building was purchased by investors and renovated, and leased to a child care center.

== Description ==
The Hudsonville Christian School Building is a one-story structure clad with white-painted clapboards and capped with a combination hip and gable roof. The building contains six classrooms, constructed in three phases of two classrooms each. The western end of the building, topped with a hipped roof, houses a vestibule with two classrooms. The vestibule projects from the front of the building. The middle section of the building contains two more classrooms, a corridor separating them from the original rooms, and a restroom. The eastern section contains two more classrooms, another corridor, and a second restroom. These two sections are covered with a single broad hipped roof with a gable section connecting to the western hipped roof.
