= Washington Square Historic District (Holland, Michigan) =

- U.S. National Register of Historic Places
- U.S. Historic district
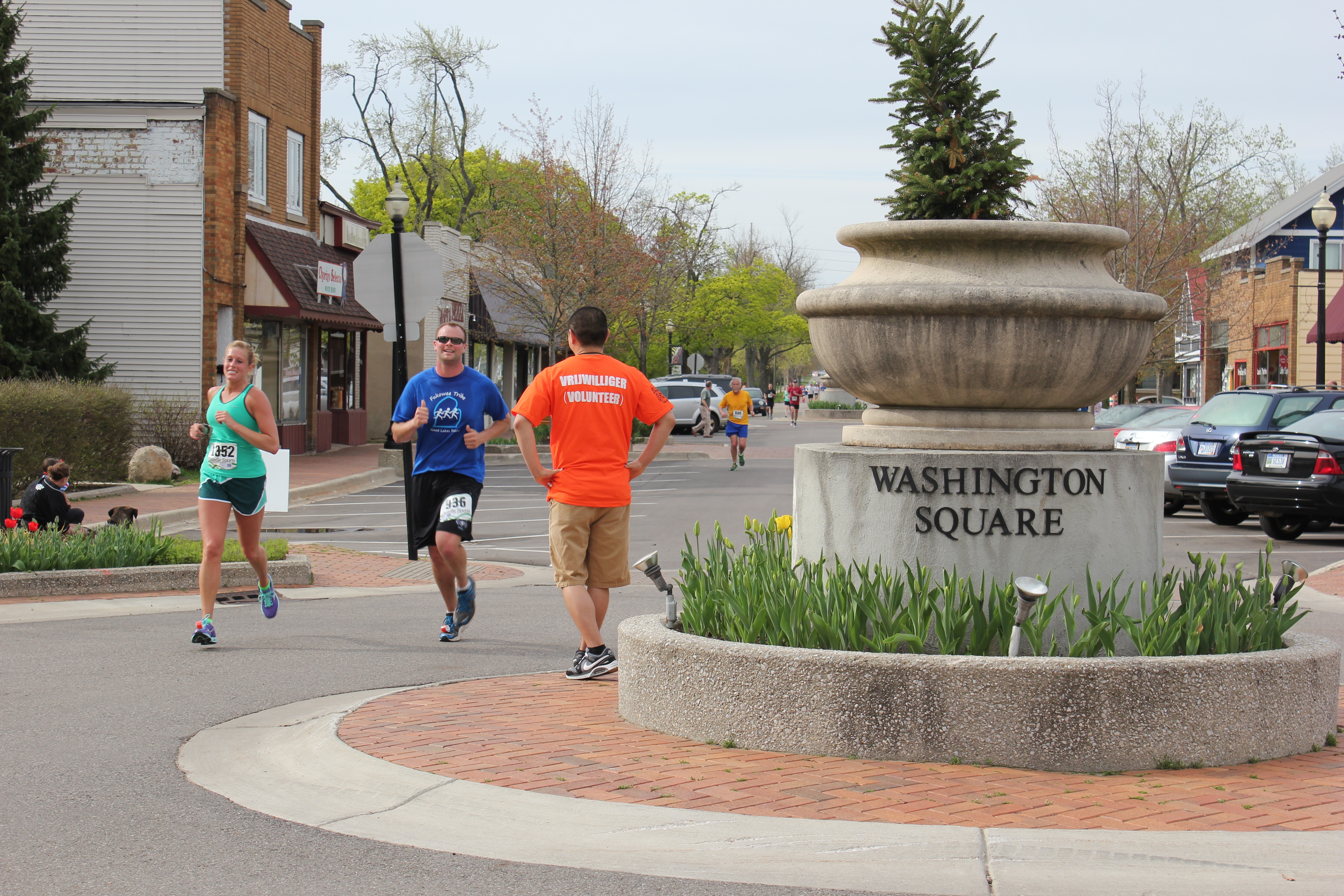
- 2013 Tulip Time Run through Washington Square, Holland MI - At planter on Washington
- Interactive map
- Location: Washington Ave. between West 18th St. and West 19th St., Holland, Michigan
- Coordinates: 42°46′51″N 86°07′01″W
- Built: 1911
- Architectural style: Commercial Brick, Bungalow
- NRHP reference No.: 100012619
- Added to NRHP: January 26, 2026

The Washington Square Historic District is a historic district located along a single block of Washington Avenue, between West 18th Street and West 19th Street in Holland, Michigan. It was listed on the National Register of Historic Places in 2026.

== History ==
The land which Washington Square site on was platted in various ways in the late 19th and early 20th century, but was not developed until 1911. At that time, the city of Holland began some improvements to what was then First Avenue (now Washington) in this area to make it more attractive to landowners. The same year, Peter Maas purchased two lots at the corner of Washington and West 18th Street and constructed a corner store. In 1912, Harry Dornbos constructed a small meat market next door.

Most of the development in the area occurred in the 1920s. By 1925, most of the northern half of the block was filled in with established businesses. Development moved to the southern half, and in 1929 a relatively larger Kroger opened up. More buildings were constructed after the end of World War II, and by 1958 the block was complete. The section of buildings substantially retains its historic integrity.

== Description ==
The Washington Square Historic District contains 13 buildings, 12 of which contribute to the historic character of the district. The buildings are primarily single story commercial structures and are arranged along a single block. The section of Washington is defined by traffic circles at each end of the block and a mid-block alley crossing Washington.

The buildings in the district are:

- Slikkers House (219 West 19th Street / 452-454 Washington Avenue), constructed c. 1923 / c. 1942. The Slikkers House is a two-story front-gable residence with an attached brick commercial annex at the rear.
- 448-450 Washington Avenue, constructed c. 1923 / c. 1929. These two buildings are single story brick commercial buildings of similar construction. Although constructed as separate structures, they have been combined and operate under a single address.
- 444 Washington Avenue, constructed 1912. This is a single story masonry building with a recessed entrance flanked by large display windows.
- 438-442 Washington Avenue. These two buildings are single story brick commercial structures of similar height and setback, but different design. They have been combined and operate under a single address.
- 436 Washington Avenue, constructed 1927. This single story structure has been altered enough to lose its historic integrity, and does not contribute to the historic district.
- 434 Washington Avenue, constructed 1911. This building is a two-story vernacular frame structure. The main entrance is slightly above gradea nd is flanked by large display windows.
- 208 West 18th Street, constructed 1958. This structure is a single-story former automobile service station, built after the original structure at this location was destroyed by fire.
- 439 Washington Avenue, constructed c. 1926. This building is a two-story brick space with a commercial unit on the first floor and a residence above. An awning shelters the first floor entrance.
- 441 Washington Avenue, constructed c. 1928. This structure is a single story brick commercial building.
- 445-451 Washington Avenue, constructed 1927. This single story brick building contains three similar storefronts, the center one of which is substantially wider.
- 453 Washington Avenue, constructed c. 1954. This single story brick structure has large storefront windows, above which is a wide flat awning.
- 455 Washington Avenue, constructed 1948 / 1952. This single story brick structure has a center entrance flanked by large display windows.
