= Ottawa Beach Historic District =

Historic district in Michigan, United States

- U.S. National Register of Historic Places
- U.S. Historic district
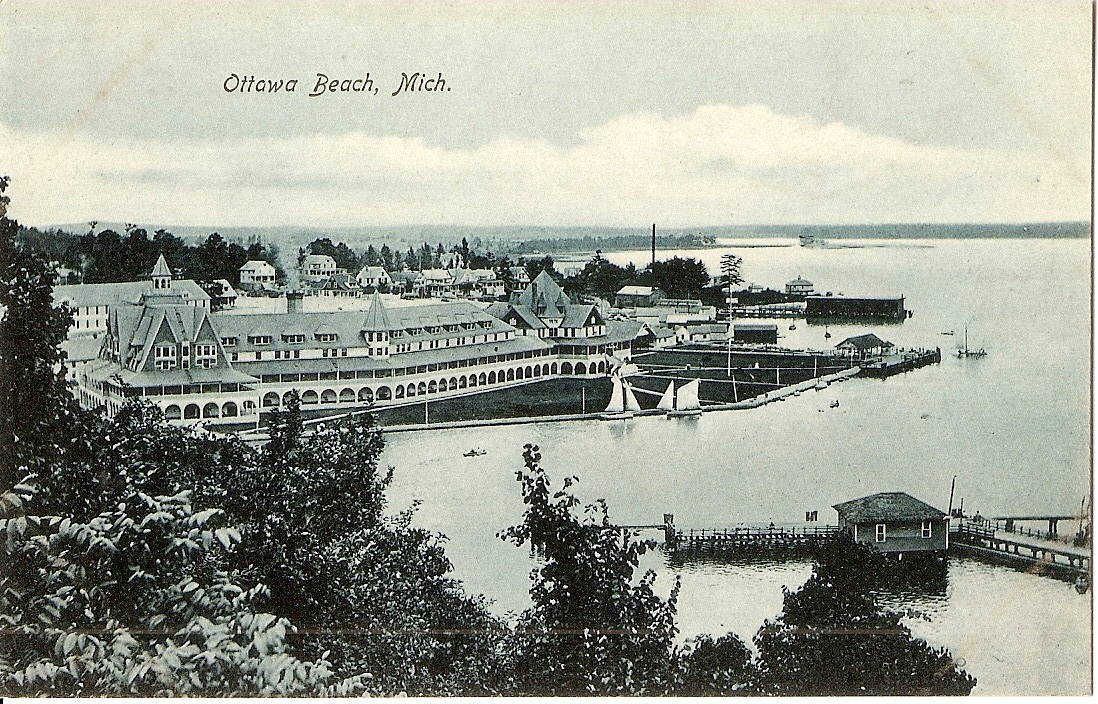

- Location within Michigan Location within the United States
- Interactive map
- Location: Ottawa Beach Rd., Park Township
- Coordinates: 42°46′34″N 86°12′22″W
- Area: 80 acres (32 ha)
- Built: 1886
- Architectural style: Bungalow/craftsman, Queen Anne, Colonial Revival
- NRHP reference No.: 95000451
- Added to NRHP: April 14, 1995

The Ottawa Beach Historic District is a residential historic district located on Ottawa Beach Road in Park Township, Ottawa County, Michigan near the outlet of Lake Macatawa. It was listed on the National Register of Historic Places in 1995.

== History ==
Ottawa Beach was developed by the West Michigan Park Association, which consisted of a number of prominent citizens of Grand Rapids, Michigan, including officers of the Chicago and West Michigan Railway. In 1885, the association purchased this tract of land, and in 1886 the land was platted into 150 cottage lots, a hotel, and a boat dock to connect with the railroad's Holland terminal, open park spaces that were to remain undeveloped, and beach resort property. The Association members selected their plats by lottery. The railroad constructed the Hotel Ottawa, and Association members gradually began constructing cottages on the lots. The first cottage was built in 1887–88, and by 1890 about twenty cottages were built.

In addition to Association members, the resort attracted summer boarders at the hotel, as well as day trippers visiting the beach itself. In 1890, the railroad extended its line directly from Holland, replacing the boat dock. The hotel proved enormously popular, and was enlarged in 1890, again in 1896, and a third time in 1901. The Chicago and West Michigan Railway eventually merged in to the Pere Marquette Railway, which continued ownership of the hotel. In the meantime, another twenty or so cottages were built in the 1890s, and a further twenty or so in the first decade of the 1900s.

The early owners of the cottages were a diverse lot, but primarily successful businessmen. These early residents included Charles M. Heald, general manager of the Chicago and West Michigan Railroad and later president of the Pere Marquette Railroad, and J. Boyd Pantlind, manager of the Morton House, one of Grand Rapids' leading hostelries. It also included Melville R. Bissell, founder of the Bissell Carpet Sweeper Company, and General Lewis W. Heath, owner of a large hatter and furrier firm, and a personal friend of President James A. Garfield. Finally, Gerald Ford Sr., father of President Gerald Ford, also owned a cottage in Ottawa Beach.

The railroad sold the hotel and resort property in 1913 to J. Boyd Pantlind. The hotel burned in 1923, and was not rebuilt. In 1925, Pantlind sold the beach resort property to the state of Michigan, which turned it into the Holland State Park. Most of the remainder of the cottages in the district were completed in the 1910s and 1920s. Several other boardinghouses and lodges were also constructed to serve the public, and a pair of grocery stores opened in the area.

Over the decades of the twentieth century, Ottawa Beach has tended to retain its historic character. Due to legal complications concerning ownership, the resort's "parks" have remained undeveloped. Many of the cottage lots lacked road access, discouraging new construction and modernization.

== Description ==
Ottawa Beach consists of two groupings of cottages constructed in the late nineteenth and early twentieth century. The wooden structures are placed in rows along the slopes of Mt. Pisga, a tree-covered sandy hill. The two groupings of cottages are the "lower" cluster at the east end of the resort grounds overlooking Lake Macatawa, and the "upper" cluster at the west end overlooking Lake Michigan. Cottage lots are platted in parallel rows, fronting on pedestrian walkways. Other portions of the resort grounds are platted as a series of "parks," intended to be undeveloped grounds held in common by the residents.

Cottages at the resort are primarily summer residences, and few are winterized. They are wood-frame buildings, mostly with wood siding. Nearly all cottages have wide verandas along the front, with many having upper story portions.
