= Zeeland Record Company Building =

- U.S. National Register of Historic Places
- Interactive map
- Location: 16 South Elm St., Zeeland, Michigan
- Coordinates: 42°48′43″N 86°01′00″W
- Built: 1925
- Built by: Peter Brill, John Hamer
- Architectural style: Commercial brick
- NRHP reference No.: 100012502
- Added to NRHP: January 8, 2026

The Zeeland Record Company Building is commercial building located at 16 South Elm Street in Zeeland, Michigan, United States. It was listed on the National Register of Historic Places in 2026.

== History ==
The Zeeland Record newspaper began operation in 1893 as the Zeeland Enquirer. It was renamed in 1896, but the paper struggled during its first few years as advertising dollars were scarce. The paper passed through multiple owners and multiple buildings, and by the late 1900s was growing in circulation. In 1908, Adrian and William Van Koevering purchased the paper. In 1911 the business moved into 14 S. Elm Street. William Van Koevering died in 1917, leaving Adrian Van Koevering as owner of the paper. By the 1920s, however, the space was growing cramped, and in 1925 the Zeeland Record constructed a new building next door at 16 S. Elm.

With the additional space, the newspaper purchased new printing equipment, and was able to print other products such as magazines and pamphlets. The Great Depression, however, substantially reduced revenue. In 1947, Adrian Van Koevering sold the paper to his two sons, and the Van Koevering continued to own the paper and operate it out of the building at 16 South Elm Street until well into the 21st century. In 2024, the Detroit Legal News Publishing Company purchased the paper and took over publication. The building was sold to local contractor Midwest Construction Group, who remodeled the building and moved their offices into the building in late 2024.

== Description ==
The Zeeland Record Company Building is a single story brick building with a flat roof. The front facade is clad with reddish brown brick, and other sides are clad with cream colored brick. The front facade is symmetrical. Piers are located at each corner, and a central entrance is recessed within an alcove. On each side of the entrance are tripartite windows similar to the Chicago style. A parapet runs across the roofline.
