= Holland Historic District (Suffolk, Virginia) =

Historic district in Virginia, United States

- U.S. National Register of Historic Places
- U.S. Historic district
- Virginia Landmarks Register
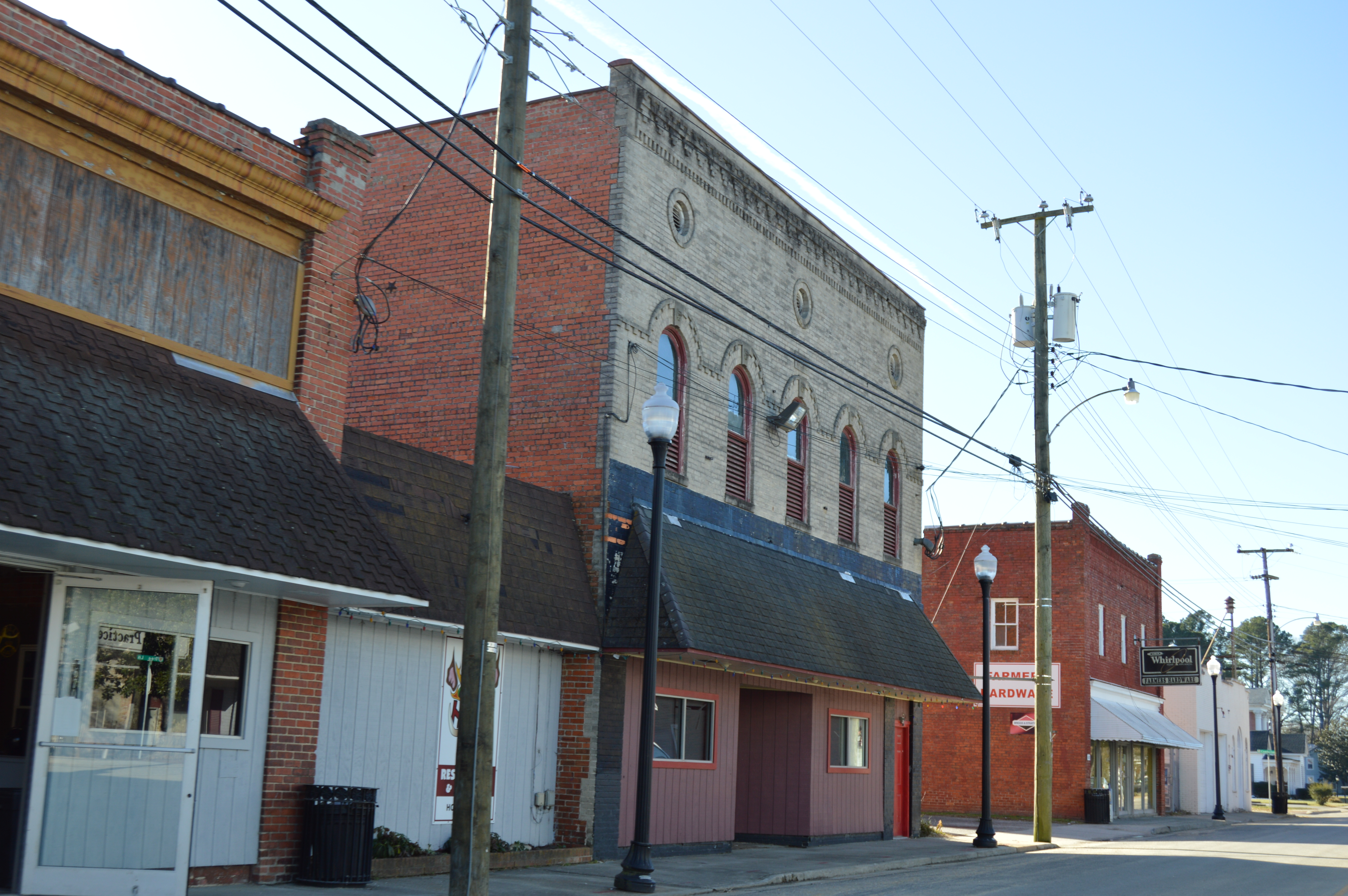
- Commercial district

- Location within Virginia Location within the United States
- Location: Junction of U.S. Route 58 with State Route 189 and Dutch Road, Suffolk, Virginia
- Coordinates: 36°40′59″N 76°46′32″W
- Architect: R.H. Riedel
- Architectural style: Late 19th And Early 20th Century American Movements, Side-passage, Single-pile
- NRHP reference No.: 95000600
- VLR No.: 133-0691

Significant dates
- Added to NRHP: May 18, 1995
- Designated VLR: September 15, 1992

Holland Historic District is a national historic district located at Suffolk, Virginia. The district encompasses 106 contributing buildings and 1 contributing site in the crossroads community of Holland in Suffolk. The district includes a variety of turn-of-the-20th century residential styles, a smaller number of brick commercial structures, several industrial buildings along the railroad, and two churches. Most of the buildings in Holland were built after 1910. Notable buildings include Dr. Job Holland Building, the former Bank of Holland, the railroad depot, Holland Christian Church (1918), Holland Baptist Church (1922), and the William T. Holland farmhouse (1860–1880).

It was added to the National Register of Historic Places in 1983.
