= List of mayors of Holland, Michigan =

The following is a list of mayors of the city of Holland, Michigan, USA.

- Isaac Cappon, 1867–1868, 1870–1871, 1874–1875, 1879-1880
- Bernardus Ledeboer, 1868–1870, 1871-1872
- Edward J. Harrington, 1872-1874
- John Van Landegend, 1875-1877
- Kommer Schadelee, 1877-1879
- Engbertus Van Der Veen, 1880-1881
- John Roost, 1881–1882
- William H. Beach, 1882—1885
- Rokus Kanters, 1885-1896
- Patrick H. McBride, 1886–1888
- Cornelius J. De Roo, 1888–1889, 1902-1904
- Henry Kremers, 1889-1890
- Oscar E. Yates, 1890-1892
- Edward J. Harrington, 1892-1893
- George P. Hummer, 1893-1895
- Gerrit J. Diekema, 1895–1896
- James De Young, 1896-1898
- Germ W. Mokma, 1898–1900
- William Brusse, 1900-1902
- Henry Geerlings, 1904—1906
- Jacob G. Van Putten, 1906-1908
- Henry Brusse, 1908-1911
- Evert P. Stephan, 1911-1912
- Nicodemus Bosch, ca.1912
- Evart P. Stephan, ca.1921-1922
- Henry Geerlings, ca.1937
- Harry Harrington, 1951-1955
- Robert Visscher, 1955-1961
- Nelson Bosman, 1961-1969
- L. W. Lamb, 1971-1973
- Louis Hallacy II, 1973-1979
- Richard Smith, 1979-1983
- William Sikkel, 1983-1987
- Phil Tanis, 1987-1989
- Neal Berghoef,1989-1993
- Albert H. McGeehan, 1993-2011
- Kurt Dykstra, 2009-2014 (resigned)
- Robert VandeVusse, 2014 (appointed)
- Nancy DeBoer, 2015-2019
- Nathan Bocks, 2020-

== See also ==
- History of Holland, Michigan
- Holland Old City Hall and Fire Station
