= Port Sheldon Township, Michigan =

- Civil township
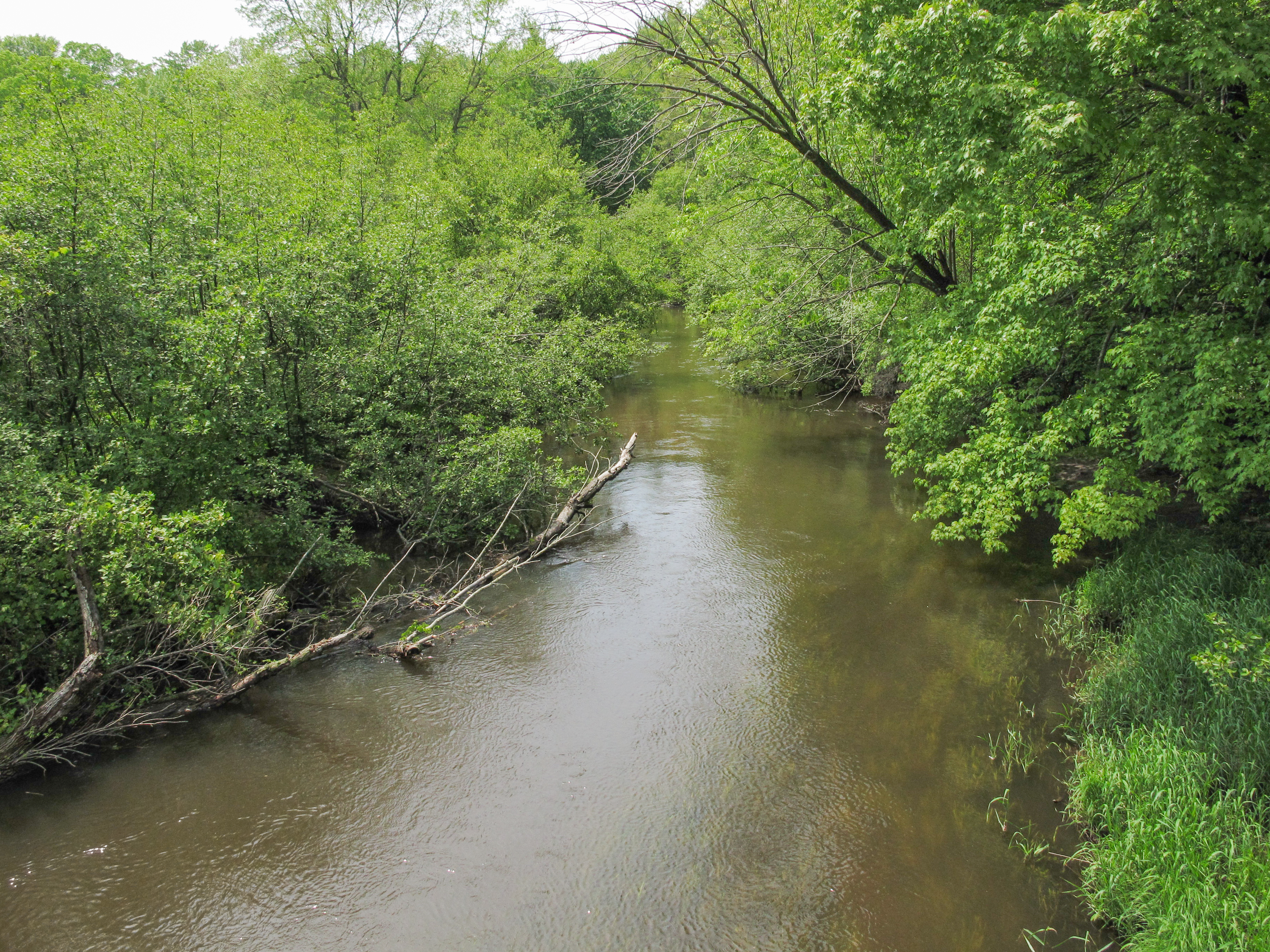
- The Pigeon River flowing through the township

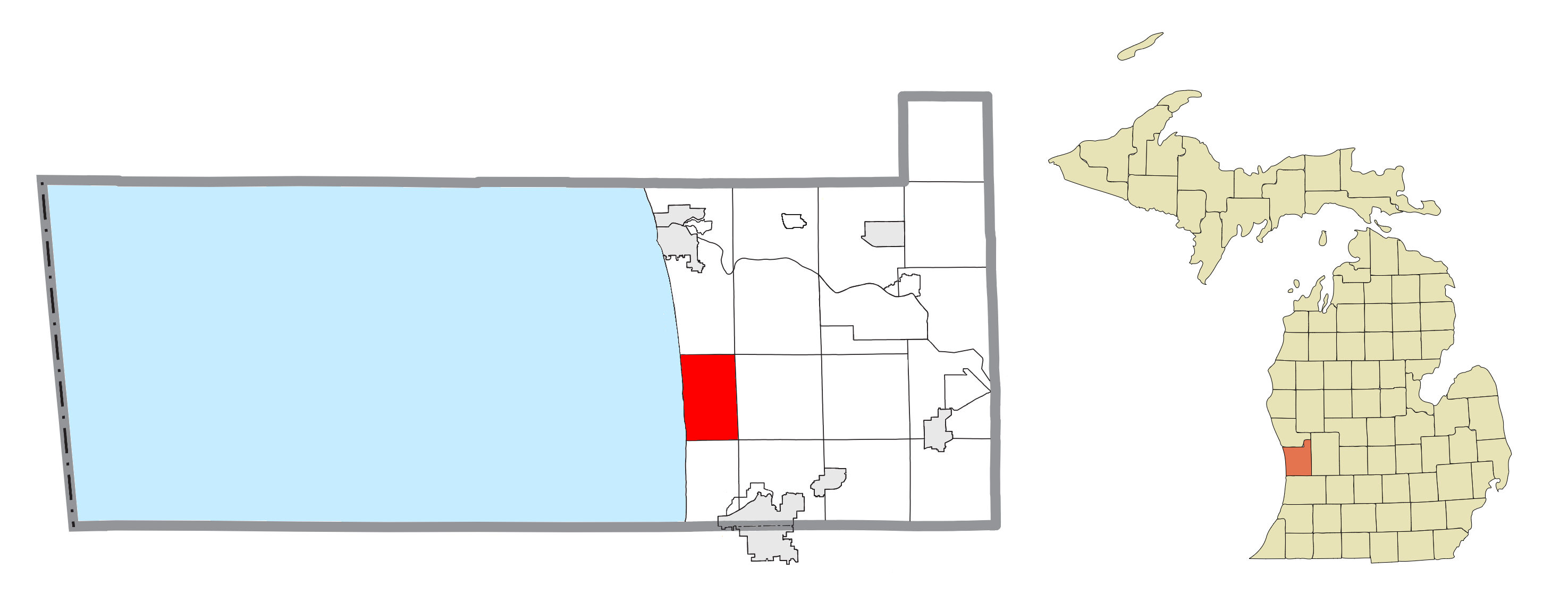
- Location within Ottawa County

- Location within the state of Michigan Location within the United States
- Coordinates: 42°53′59″N 86°10′50″W
- Country: United States
- State: Michigan
- County: Ottawa
- Established: 1924

Government
  - Supervisor: Mike Sabatino
  - Clerk: Meredith Hemmeke

Area
  - Total: 22.62 sq mi (58.59 km^{2})
  - Land: 22.30 sq mi (57.76 km^{2})
  - Water: 0.32 sq mi (0.83 km^{2})
- Elevation: 594 ft (181 m)

Population (2020)
  - Total: 5,206
  - Density: 233.5/sq mi (90.2/km^{2})
- Time zone: UTC-5 (Eastern (EST))
  - Summer (DST): UTC-4 (EDT)
- ZIP code: 49424 (Holland); 49460 (West Olive)
- Area code: 616
- FIPS code: 26-65940
- GNIS feature ID: 1626936
- Website: Official website

Port Sheldon Township is a civil township of Ottawa County in the U.S. state of Michigan. As of the 2020 census, the township population was 5,206.

== History ==
Port Sheldon Township was established in 1924 by the division off the west end of what had been Olive Township, reducing Olive Township to about 36 square miles.

== Communities ==
- Port Sheldon is an unincorporated community in the township at 42°53′58″N 86°11′59″W
- West Olive is an unincorporated community on the east boundary of Port Sheldon Township with Olive Township. The West Olive ZIP code 49460 serves most of the township.
- The city of Holland is to the south, and the Holland ZIP code 49424 serves some areas in the southern part of Port Sheldon Township.

== Geography ==
According to the United States Census Bureau, the township has a total area of 22.6 square miles (59 km^{2}), of which 22.4 square miles (58 km^{2}) is land and 0.3 square miles (0.78 km^{2}) (1.28%) is water.

The Pigeon River runs through Port Sheldon and discharges into Pigeon Lake. Pigeon Lake empties into Lake Michigan through a channel protected by two piers. There is a small harbor in the lake known as Port Sheldon. The Michigan Department of Natural Resources maintains a public access on the north side of the lake to facilitate recreational activities on Pigeon Lake and Lake Michigan. Consumers Energy's coal-fired JH Campbell power plant draws water from Pigeon Lake for cooling purposes and discharges it into Lake Michigan.

== Demographics ==
Historical population
| Census | Pop. | Note | %± |
|---|---|---|---|
| 2000 | 4,503 | | — |
| 2010 | 4,240 | | −5.8% |
| 2020 | 5,206 | | 22.8% |
U.S. Decennial Census

As of the census of 2000, there were 4,503 people, 1,574 households, and 1,273 families residing in the township. The population density was 201.4 inhabitants per square mile (77.8/km^{2}). There were 1,854 housing units at an average density of 82.9 per square mile (32.0/km^{2}). The racial makeup of the township was 93.47% White, 0.51% African American, 0.29% Native American, 1.11% Asian, 0.02% Pacific Islander, 2.89% from other races, and 1.71% from two or more races. Hispanic or Latino of any race were 6.15% of the population.

There were 1,574 households, out of which 40.8% had children under the age of 18 living with them, 71.7% were married couples living together, 5.9% had a female householder with no husband present, and 19.1% were non-families. 14.5% of all households were made up of individuals, and 3.0% had someone living alone who was 65 years of age or older. The average household size was 2.85 and the average family size was 3.16.

In the township the population was spread out, with 29.5% under the age of 18, 7.6% from 18 to 24, 30.0% from 25 to 44, 25.0% from 45 to 64, and 7.9% who were 65 years of age or older. The median age was 36 years. For every 100 females, there were 108.0 males. For every 100 females age 18 and over, there were 105.3 males.

The median income for a household in the township was $63,604, and the median income for a family was $64,229. Males had a median income of $42,375 versus $26,054 for females. The per capita income for the township was $26,854. About 0.3% of families and 1.8% of the population were below the poverty line, including 1.3% of those under age 18 and 12.2% of those age 65 or over.
