= Holland Historic District (Holland, Michigan) =

Historic district in Michigan, United States

- U.S. National Register of Historic Places
- U.S. Historic district
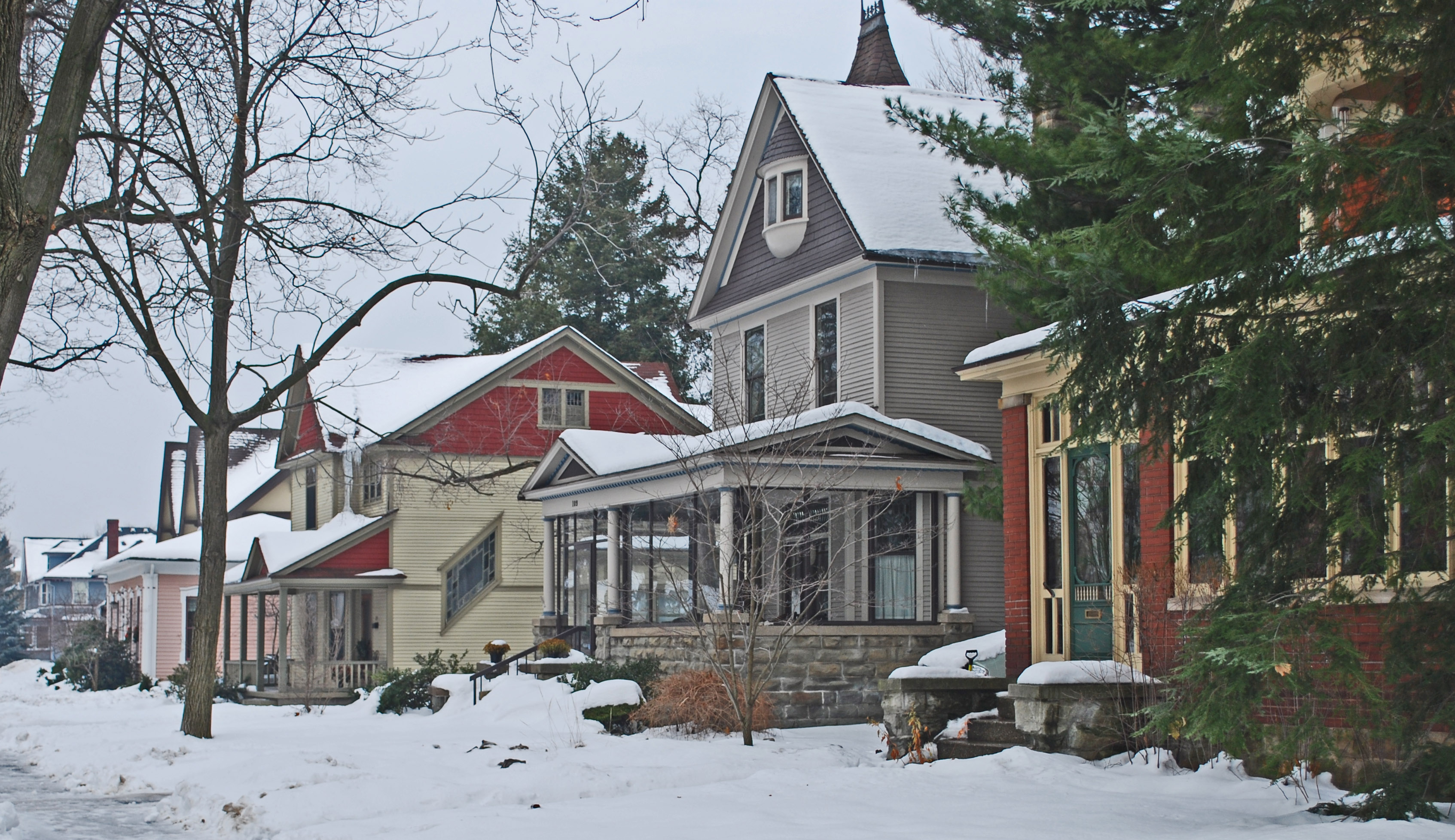

- Location within Michigan Location within the United States
- Interactive map
- Location: 11th, 12th, 13th, 14th, and 15th Sts., from Washington, to College Ave. Holland, Michigan
- Coordinates: 42°47′12″N 86°6′48″W
- Area: 97 acres (39 ha)
- Architect: Multiple
- Architectural style: Late Victorian, Queen Anne, Colonial Revival, Bungalow/craftsman
- NRHP reference No.: 83000889 (original); 90001234 (increase)

Significant dates
- Added to NRHP: May 12, 1983
- Boundary increase: August 10, 1990

The Holland Historic District is a primarily residential historic district in Holland, Michigan. It includes buildings along 11th, 12th, and 13th Streets from roughly Washington Boulevard on the west to College Avenue on the east, along with buildings on 14th Street from Pine Avenue on the west to just past College Avenue on the east, and buildings on 15th Street from Pine Avenue to River Avenue. The original portion of the district, on 11th, 12th, and 13th Streets between Washington Boulevard and Pine Avenue, was listed on the National Register of Historic Places in 1983. The remainder of the district was listed on the Register in 1990.

== History ==
Holland was founded in 1847 by immigrants from The Netherlands led by the Rev. Albertus C. Van Raalte. In 1871, a forest fire burned almost the entire city. The Panic of 1873 slowed rebuilding, but by the 1880s the city had been almost entirely reconstructed. This district was gradually rebuilt as the city recovered from the fire and the population surged. By 1890, there were 4000 people living in Holland; by 1900 this figure had almost doubled. The economic and population growth continued well into the twentieth century.

During these boom years, the civic and business leaders of the city built houses along West 11th, 12th, 13th, and 14th Streets. Early residents of the district included:

- Gerrit J. Diekema, lawyer (134 West 12th Street)
- George Hummer of the West Michigan Furniture Company (191 West 12th Street)
- Bert Keppel, a coalyard owner (12 West 13th)
- Gerrit Kellen, president of Hope College (18 East 12th)
- Dr. Henry Kremers, physician, surgeon and vice-president of the Holland Sugar Company (8 East 12th)
- Henry Kiekintveld, owner of a bookstore (11 West 14th)
- Cornelius Lokker, owner of the Holland Crystal Creamery (80 East 13th)
- F. N. Jonkman, a prominent Holland contractor and builder (79 East 14th)
- M. G. Manting, a printer and publisher of the ottawa County Times (93 West 14th)
- Charles McLean, President of the Holland-St. Louis Sugar Company, a sugar beet-processing firm
- Bert Pratt, drygoods (51 East 14th)
- John Raven, jeweler (109 West 12th Street)
- Andries Steketee of A. Steketee and Sons General Store (66 West 11th Street)
- Bert Slagh, wallpaper and paints (349 College Avenue)
- Herman Van Ark of the Bayview Furniture Company (214 West 12th Street)
- Walter Zylstra, a grocer (333 College Avenue)

== Description ==
The Holland Historic District is located west and south of Holland's primary business district and the adjacent Hope College. It is a primarily residential district, with a smattering of commercial, educational, municipal and religious structures. The district contains a total of 194 buildings, of which 158 are considered as contributing to the historic nature of the district. Most of these are single-family residential houses. The houses in the district are significant as good representations of architectural styles characteristic of the late nineteenth and early twentieth centuries, in particular the range of fine Queen Anne structures.

In addition to the houses, the district also contains Holland's Centennial Park and multiple significant public buildings. These include:

- Third Reformed Church of Holland (1874), 111 West 13th Street.
- Hope Reformed Church, (1874-1902), 79 West 11th Street.
- Holland High School (1912), 96 West 15th Street.
- Holland Junior High School (1923) 372 River Avenue.
- Post Office (1914) 31 West 10th Street.
- Woman's Literary Club (913) 235 Central Avenue.
- Masonic Temple building (1921) 17 W. 10th Street.
- Holland City Hall (1909) 270 River Avenue.
- Bell Telephone Building (1929) 13 West 10th Street.

== Gallery ==
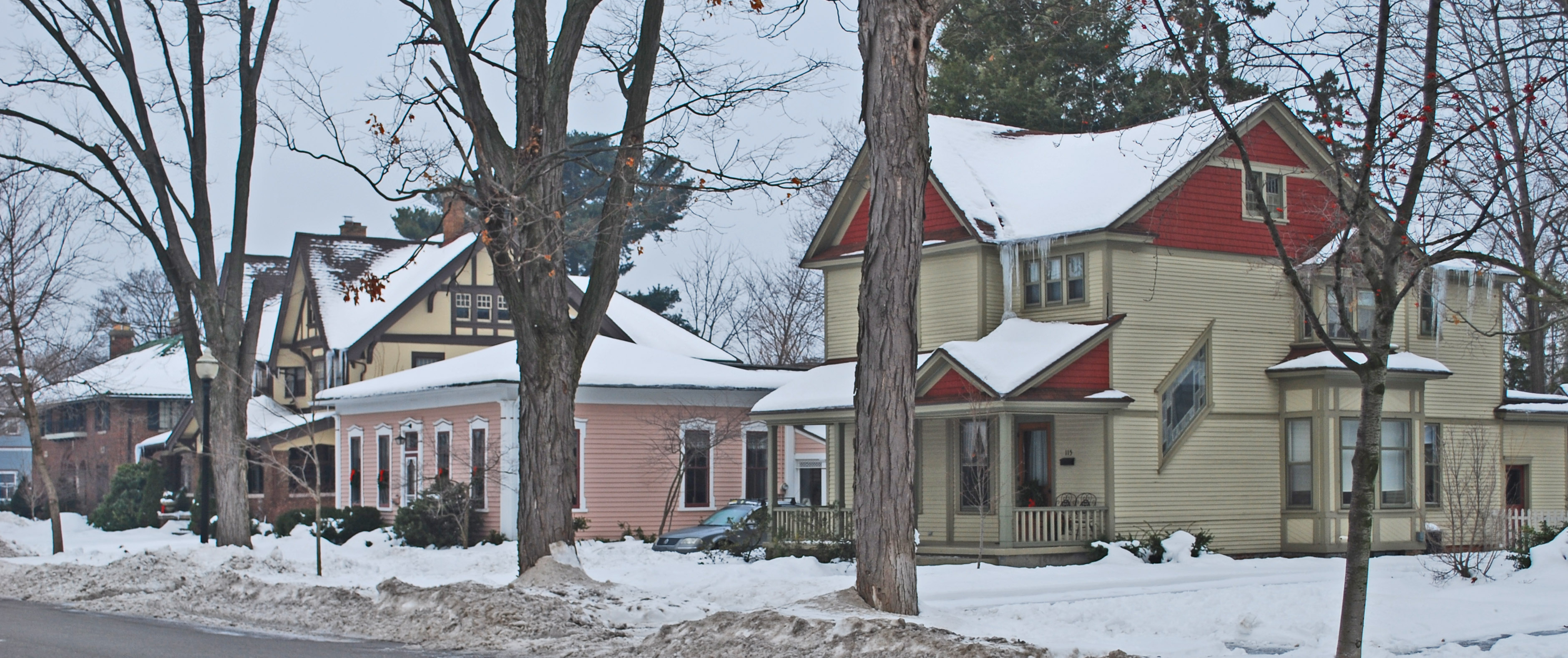

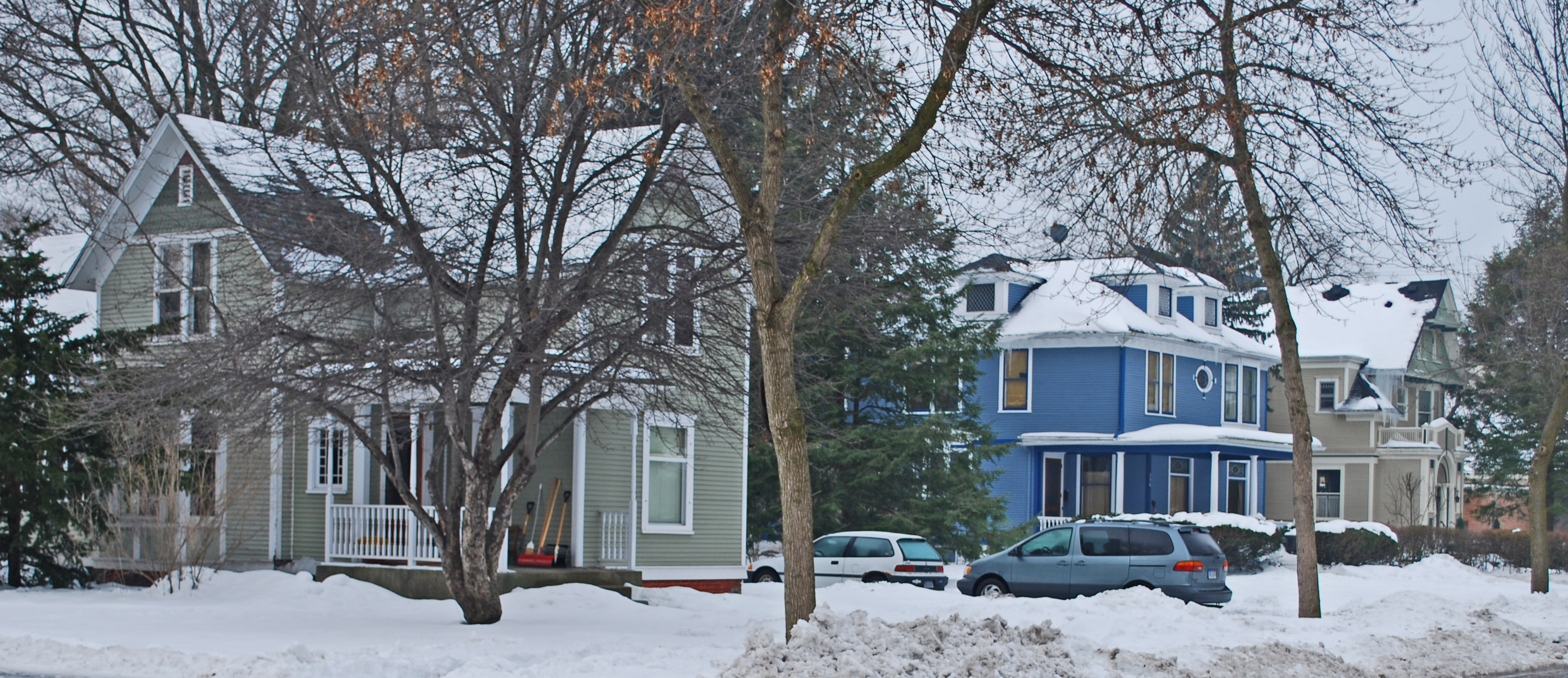

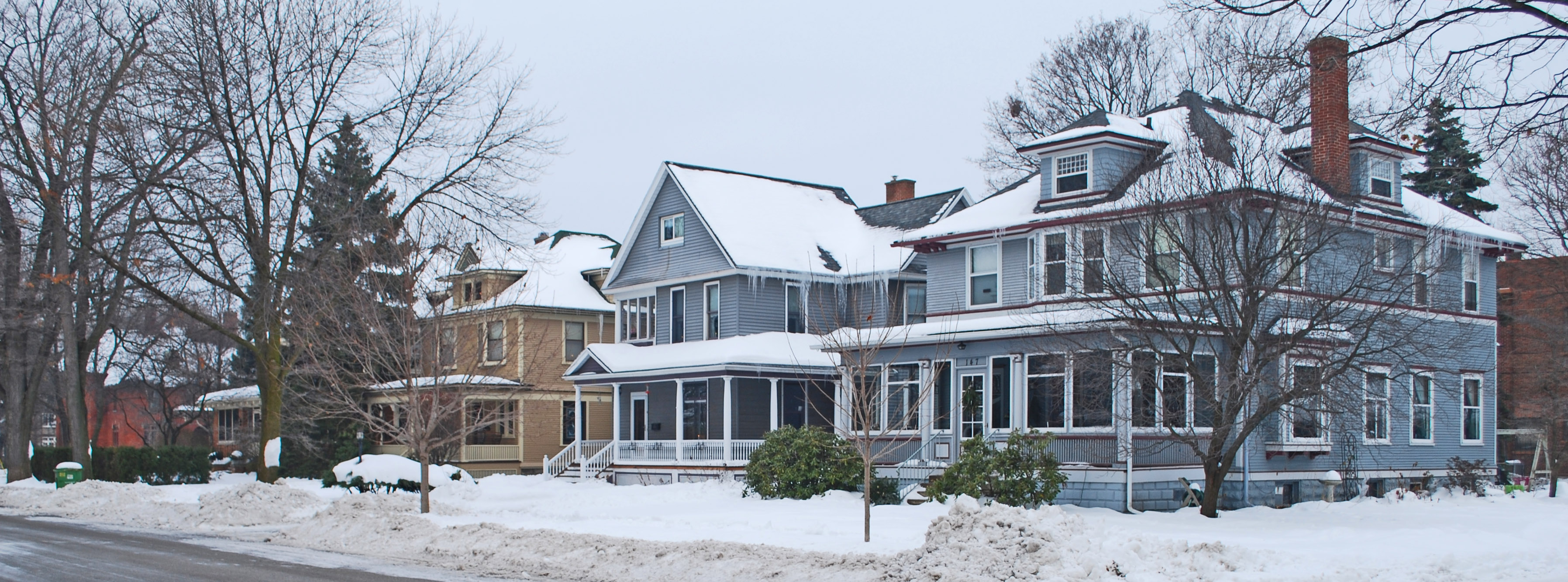
