= Egbert H. Gold Estate =

- U.S. National Register of Historic Places
- Michigan State Historic Site
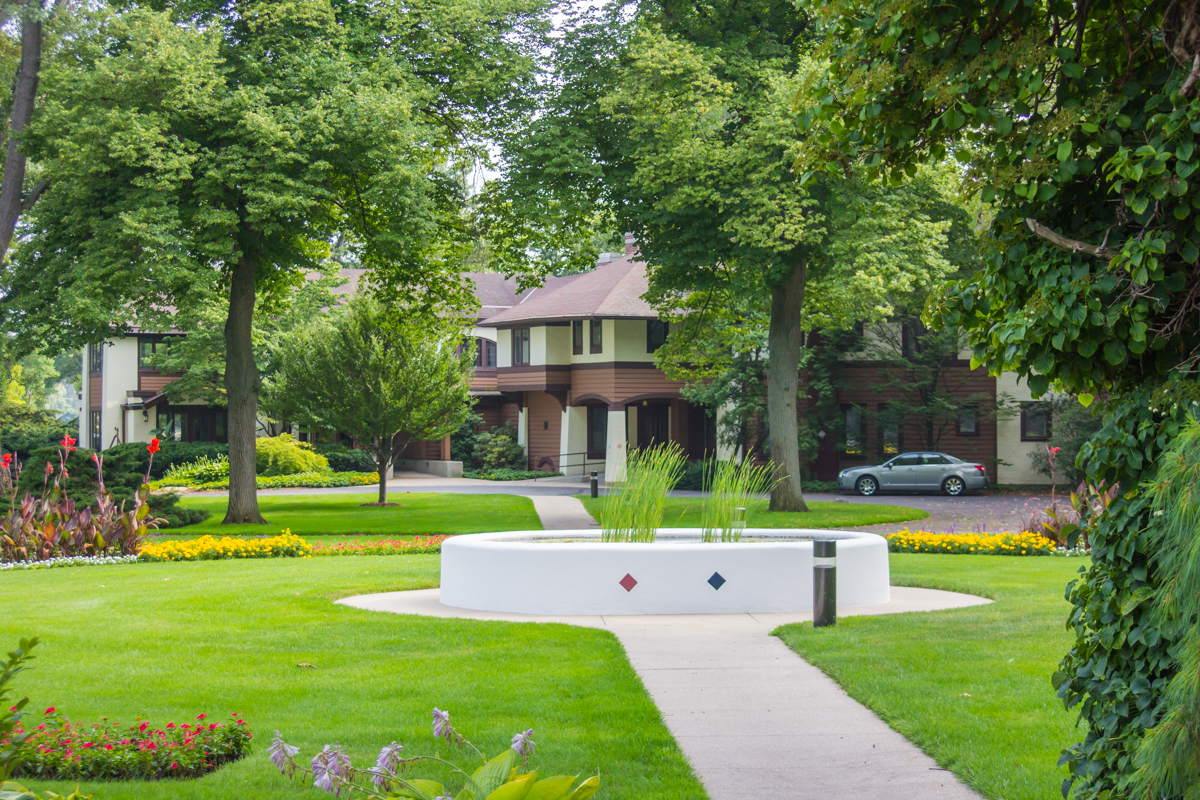

- Location within Michigan Location within the United States
- Interactive map
- Location: 1116 Marigold Lane., Holland, Michigan
- Coordinates: 42°46′51″N 86°9′21″W
- Area: 7.5 acres (3.0 ha)
- Built: 1913
- Built by: H. D. Deam
- Architect: Thomas Eddy Tallmadge, Tallmadge & Watson
- Architectural style: Prairie School
- NRHP reference No.: 84000548
- Added to NRHP: December 27, 1984

The Egbert H. Gold Estate, also known as the Marigold Lodge, is a summer estate located at 1116 Marigold Lane in Holland, Michigan. It was listed on the National Register of Historic Places in 1984. The estate is owned by furniture manufacturer Herman Miller, which uses it as a training center and private hotel for its customers.

== History ==
Egbert H. Gold was born in 1868 in Cornwall, Connecticut. His family had been designers and manufacturers of steam heating systems; Gold's father invented the first cast-iron radiator. Gold went into the family business, but in 1901 struck out on his own and established a company based in Chicago. In 1913, while yachting with his wife Margaret, Gold anchored in Lake Macatawa and went ashore to explore this peninsula. Seeing potential in the land, he purchased the property in December of that year. He had the land built up, and in 1913 began construction of a lodge on the property. Gold hired architect Thomas Eddy Tallmadge to design the lodge, and H. D. Deam to build it. He named the property "Marigold" after his wife Margaret and daughter Mary Jayne.

Gold was an avid horticulturist, and imported plantings to landscape the grounds and built greenhouses on the property. During the 1920s, Gold expanded and remodeled the lodge, and he continued to visit until his death in 1928. Margaret Gold later met and married opera singer Mischa Thorgevsky, and the family continued to use the estate until her death in 1968. In 1969, Mary Jane Gold, Egbert and Margaret's only surviving child, donated the lodge and grounds to Hope College. However, the high cost of maintenance caused the college to eventually sell the estate to manufacturer Herman Miller in 1978. Herman Miller refurbished and updated the buildings and furnishings, and uses the estate as a training center and private hotel for its customers.

== Description ==
Marigold Lodge is located on a 7 1/2-acre peninsula which projects into Lake Macatawa. The main house is a two-story Prairie School structure with dark wood and stucco facades. The property also includes a guest house, as gazebo, and other modern structures. The main house has been converted into a visitor center and hotel by Herman Miller. Other earlier structures have been replaced or reconstructed by Herman Miller.

The main lodge has a low pitched hipped roof covered with brown shingles, penetrated by red brick chimneys and pointed dormers. The facades are faced with stucco, and have horizontal bands of dark wood. The south facade has a one-story enclosed sun porch, now used as a dining room. The east and west facades have smaller enclosed porches. A service and guest wing is attached to the north facade.

Inside the lodge, the first story contains a living room, two dining rooms, a library, and sun porch. The service wing contains a modern kitchen, and office, and an employee lounge. The second story has eight bedrooms, each with attached bathrooms.
