= Coopersville station =

- Grand Rapids, Grand Haven and Muskegon Railway Depot
- U.S. National Register of Historic Places
- Michigan State Historic Site
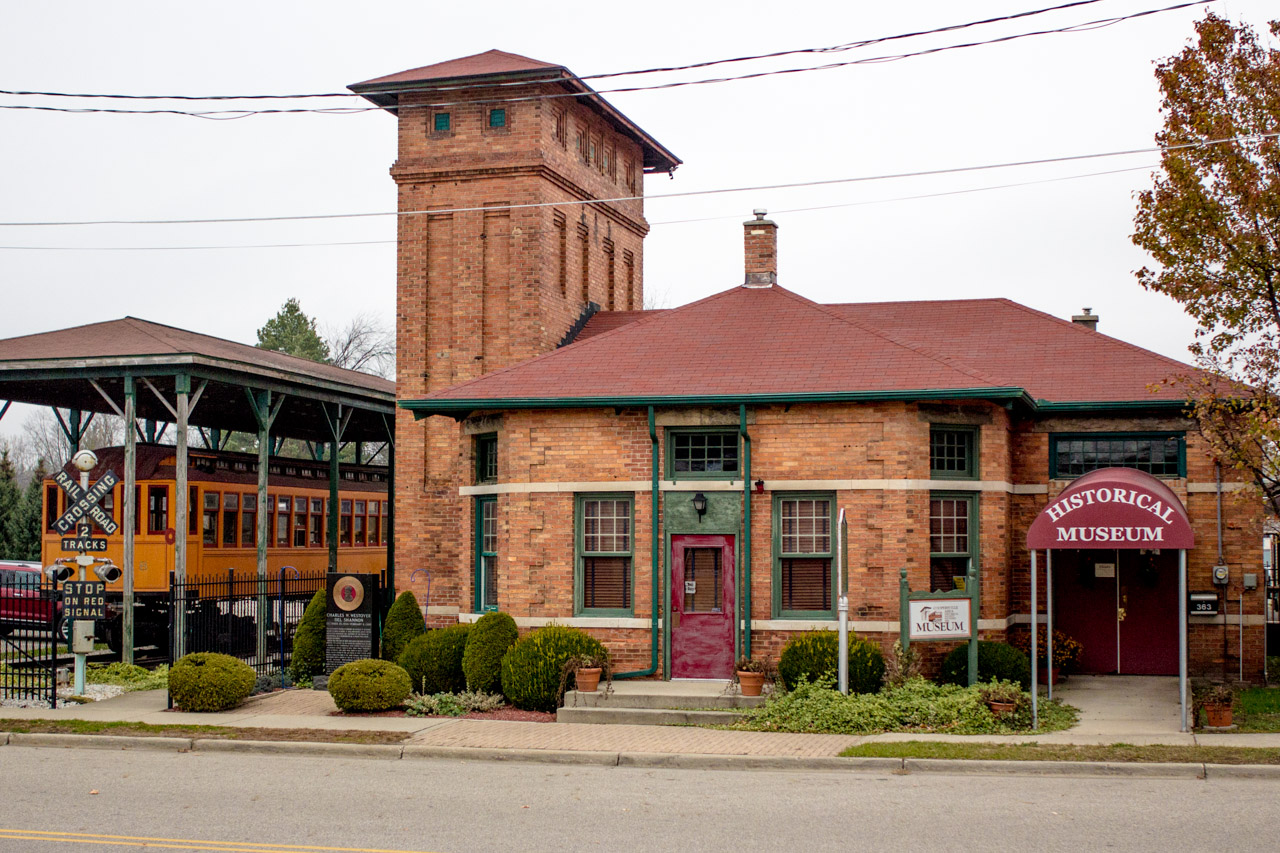

- Location within Michigan Location within the United States
- Interactive map
- Location: 363 W. Main St, Coopersville, Michigan
- Coordinates: 43°3′50.3″N 85°56′13.2″W
- Built: 1902
- NRHP reference No.: 73002294

Significant dates
- Added to NRHP: February 6, 1973
- Designated MSHS: April 14, 1972

The Coopersville Station, originally built as the Grand Rapids, Grand Haven and Muskegon Railway Depot is a historic railway station once used by the Grand Rapids, Grand Haven and Muskegon Railway in Coopersville, Michigan. The Coopersville Area Historical Society and Museum is now housed in the station.

== History ==
The Grand Rapids, Grand Haven and Muskegon Railway was incorporated in 1899, and began service in 1902 on 44 miles of interurban line. This station in Coopersville was constructed for the opening of the line. The trains were electric, and the station functioned as not only a passenger depot, but also an electric substation to supply DC power to the trains via an electrified third rail.

In 1912, the United Light and Railway Company bought out the Grand Rapids, Grand Haven and Muskegon Railway. They operated the railway until 1928. The company held only an easement on the property, so when United Light went out of business, the property reverted to the city of Coopersville. A local garden club used the property from the 1930s through at least the early 1970s. After this, it was used by the Coopersville Public School System as an alternative education site. In 1987, the Coopersville Area Historical Society acquired use of the building. They opened the building as a museum, and made renovations, completed in 1991.

== Description ==
The Grand Rapids, Grand Haven & Muskegon Railway depot in Coopersville is a single-story red brick building with an attached tower and a red clay tile roof. The building was used both as a passenger waiting room and as an electrical substation where AC power was converted to DC to power the train cars. The electrical machinery was located in the tower, and was connected by a cable to railway power lines. The openings originally for the cable are still visible on the tower. The remainder of the building was used as a passenger waiting room and to handle freight shipments.
