= Nathaniel and Esther (Savidge) Robbins House =

United States national historic place

- U.S. National Register of Historic Places
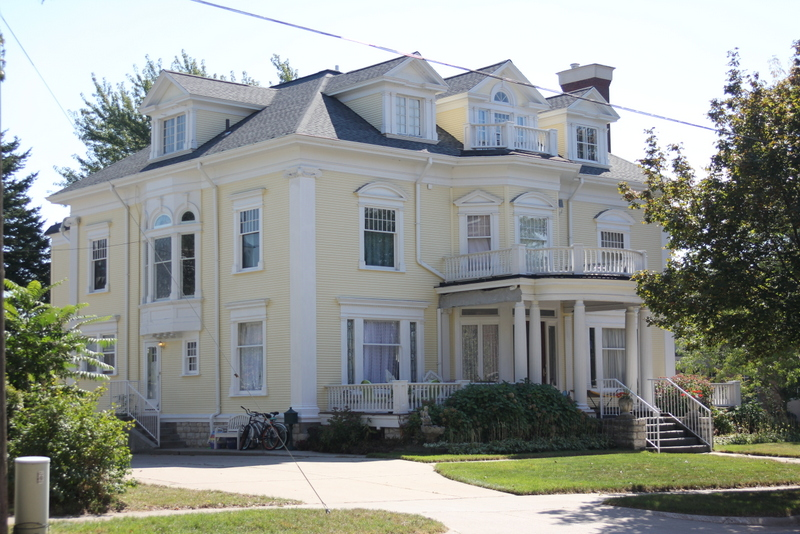

- Location within Michigan Location within the United States
- Interactive map
- Location: 20 S. 5th Ave., Grand Haven, Michigan
- Coordinates: 43°3′42″N 86°13′35″W
- Area: 0.4 acres (0.16 ha)
- Built: 1899
- Built by: Baltus Pellegrom
- Architectural style: Colonial Revival
- NRHP reference No.: 09000203
- Added to NRHP: April 16, 2009

The Nathaniel and Esther (Savidge) Robbins House is a private house located at 20 South 5th Avenue in Grand Haven, Michigan. It was listed on the National Register of Historic Places in 2009.

== History ==
Nathaniel Robbins V was born on September 29, 1866, in Benton Harbor, Michigan, the son of Captain Nathaniel Robbins IV and Hannah (Nickerson) Robbins. The elder Nathaniel Robbins operated lumber sailing ships between Benton Harbor and Grand Haven in the 1870s. The younger Robbins sailed with his father, then took on various jobs before settling in Grand Haven in 1884. He soon joined the firm of H. L. Chamberlain & Company, a coal and wood retailer, and became sole proprietor of the business in 1887.

On September 3, 1891, Nathaniel Robbins V married Esther Savidge. Esther was born in Spring Lake, Michigan, on May 17, 1866, the daughter of Hunter and Sarah Savidge. Hunter Savidge eventually became a leading lumberman and businessman in the Ottawa County area. Nathaniel and Esther Robbins purchased the site this house is located on in 1891. At the time a brick house known as the Vanderhoef house was located on the site. in 1899 they demolished the Vanderhoef house and hired Baldus Pellegrom, a Grand Haven carpenter and ship's carpenter, to construct the current house. Construction was complete in 1900.

Nathaniel and Esther Robbins had three children: Nathaniel VI, who was born in 1896, Dorothy, who was born in 1898, and Hunter, who was born in 1892. Esther Robbins died on June 20, 1920, after surgery at the Mayo Clinic in Minneapolis. In 1923, Nathaniel Robbins V married Alice Hood. The couple lived in this house until Nathaniel's death in 1940.

After Robbins died in 1940, the house passed to Gordon and Joan Laughead. The Laugheads lived in the house for nearly 50 years. Gordon died in 1969 and Joan sold the house in 1988, shortly before her own death in 1989. The house passed through multiple owners until 1993, when it was purchased by Laura and Ed Grafton of Spring Lake. They made extensive renovations and restorations to the house. In 2002, William and Linda Swano purchased the property to house their Grand Haven Financial Center. In 2019, the house was purchased by the Midwest Miniatures Museum who began renovation and adaptation to preserve the history of the house as well as convert it into a museum open to the public.

== Description ==
The Robbins House is a 2-1/2 story Colonial Revival house with a hipped roof and a coursed ashlar stone foundation. The facade is symmetric, and contains an entry veranda with classic columns and corner pilasters. A shallow bay window is placed on the second floor above the entry. The corners of the house are marked by pilasters with Ionic capitols; likewise, Tuscan pilasters frame the windows in the three roof dormers.

On the interior, the main floor contains four large rooms, a kitchen, and two bathrooms. The second floor contains five bedrooms and three bathrooms. The third floor was originally a ballroom, but has been re-purposed into three bedrooms and a modern kitchen. The house contains walnut and mahogany throughout, as paneling, stairways, pocket doors, and other millwork. There are extensive rich plaster moldings, leaded glass windows, and other fine details throughout.
