= Holland Old City Hall and Fire Station =

- U.S. National Register of Historic Places
- Michigan State Historic Site
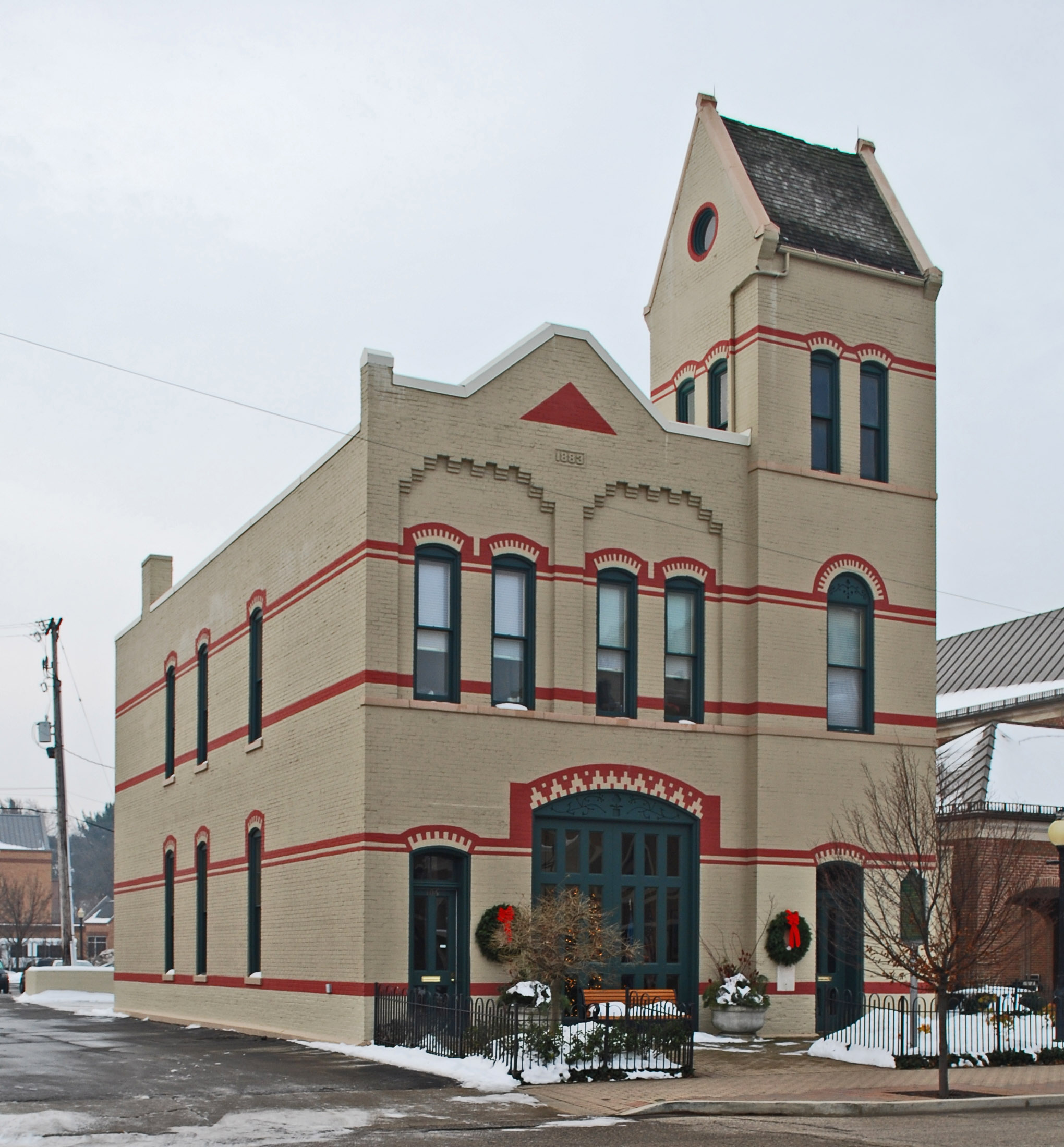

- Location within Michigan Location within the United States
- Interactive map
- Location: 108 E. 8th St., Holland, Michigan
- Coordinates: 42°47′24″N 86°6′8″W
- Area: 0.2 acres (0.081 ha)
- Built: 1883
- Built by: James Huntley
- Architect: Robinson & Barnaby, William G. Robinson
- Architectural style: Dutch Revival
- NRHP reference No.: 85000063
- Added to NRHP: January 11, 1985

The Holland Old City Hall and Fire Station is a former government building located at 108 East 8th Street in Holland, Michigan. It was listed on the National Register of Historic Places in 1985.

== History ==
Until the 1880s, the city of Holland rented space for their city council and fire department. In 1882, the city decided to construct a new city hall and fire station. They hired the Grand Rapids architectural firm of Robinson and Barnaby to design this building. The city chose contractor James Huntley to build the fire station, and work began in August 1883.

The building was substantially completed by the end of 1883, but some finishing was left in 1884. The building served as the city hall and fire station for the city until the 1910s, when a new city hall was constructed. Additions to the building were completed in 1941, and the building served as a fire station for the city until 1977, when a replacement was constructed. The building was soon thereafter sold to private investors, who renovated the structure.

== Description ==
The old Holland Old City Hall and Fire Station is a two-story brick structure with a low, flat-roofed addition. The facade is topped by a gabled parapet wall. A pointed, gable roof, Dutch Revival hose drying tower is placed on a front corner. The foundation is constructed of fieldstone. Window sills of the station are defined by a stone beltcourse.

== See also ==
- List of mayors of Holland, Michigan
