= Third Reformed Church of Holland =

Historic church in Michigan, United States

- U.S. National Register of Historic Places
- Michigan State Historic Site
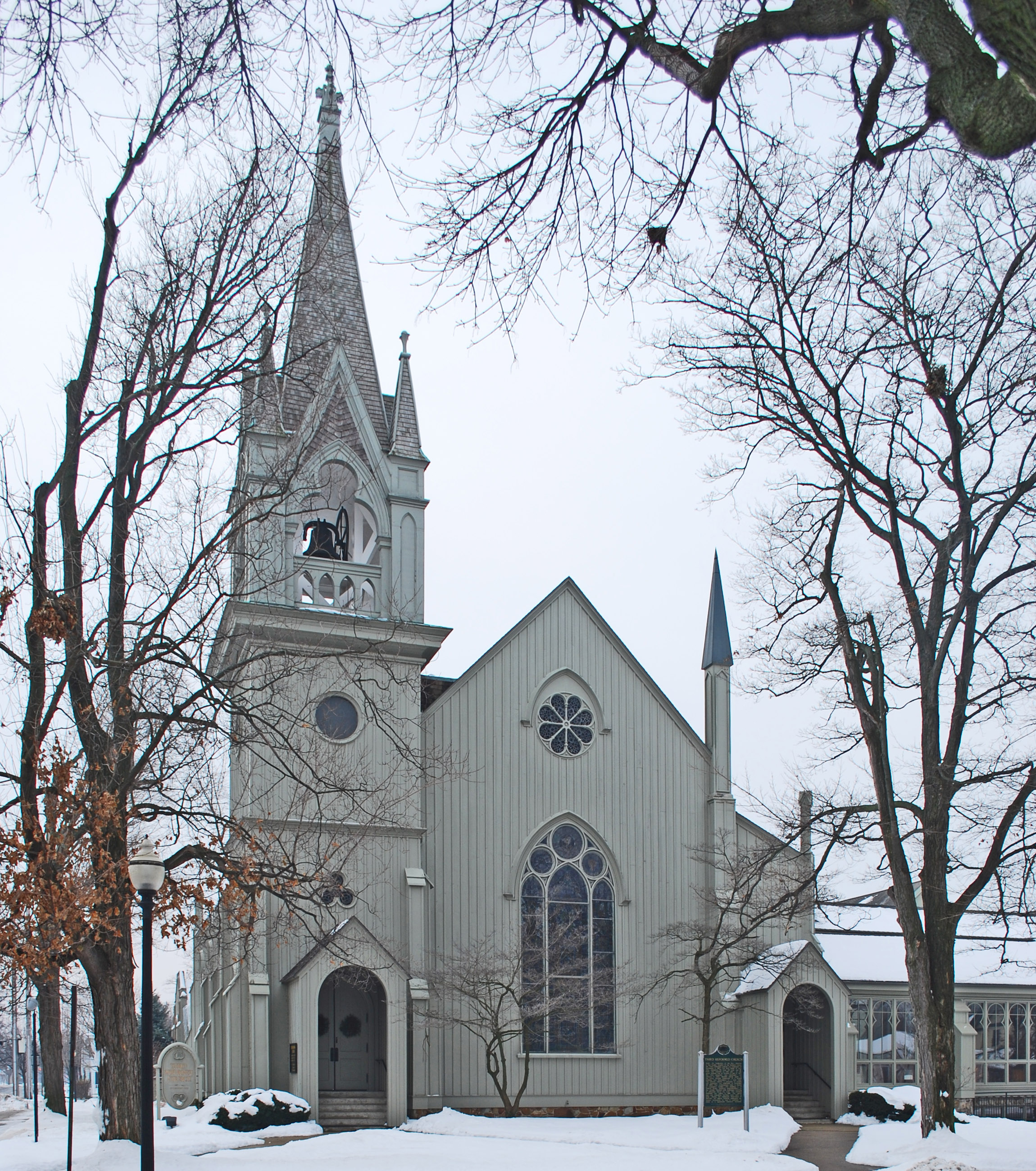

- Location within Michigan Location within the United States
- Interactive map
- Location: 111 W. 13th St., Holland, Michigan
- Coordinates: 42°47′7″N 86°6′45″W
- Area: less than one acre
- Built: 1874
- Architect: John R. Kleyn
- NRHP reference No.: 71000418

Significant dates
- Added to NRHP: April 16, 1971
- Designated MSHS: December 8, 1967

Third Reformed Church of Holland is a historic church at 111 W. 13th Street in Holland, Michigan. It was built in 1874 and added to the National Register of Historic Places in 1971.

== History ==
Dutch immigrants first settled in Holland, Michigan in 1847, and they immediately established The First Reformed Church with the Reverend Albertus Van Raalte as pastor. Over the next few years, a second Reformed congregation was established, but by the mid-1860s, the continued influx of Dutch immigrants strained the capacity of both churches. By 1866, Van Raalte recommended that the First Reformed Church be split. In 1867, the Third Reformed Church was organized and construction started on a new church building at this site. The church building was dedicated on February 14, 1868.

However, on October 8, 1871, two-thirds of Holland was destroyed by forest fires which had been burning for several weeks in areas surrounding the town. The recently constructed church was one of the first buildings destroyed. The congregation resolved to rebuild, and hired local architect John R. Kleyn to design the building. Despite setbacks, the new church was dedicated on November 25, 1874. The church has been continuously used by the congregation, and underwent a major renovation in 1967–68.

== Description ==
The Third Reformed Church is a balloon frame structure covered with vertical board and batten siding painted light gray. with brown trim. The side walls are supported by buttresses. The original section of the building measures 55 feet by 90 feet. A 15-foot square tower runs 125 feet in height. The foundation is made from sandstone.
