= Olive Township, Ottawa County, Michigan =

Olive Township, Michigan
- Civil township
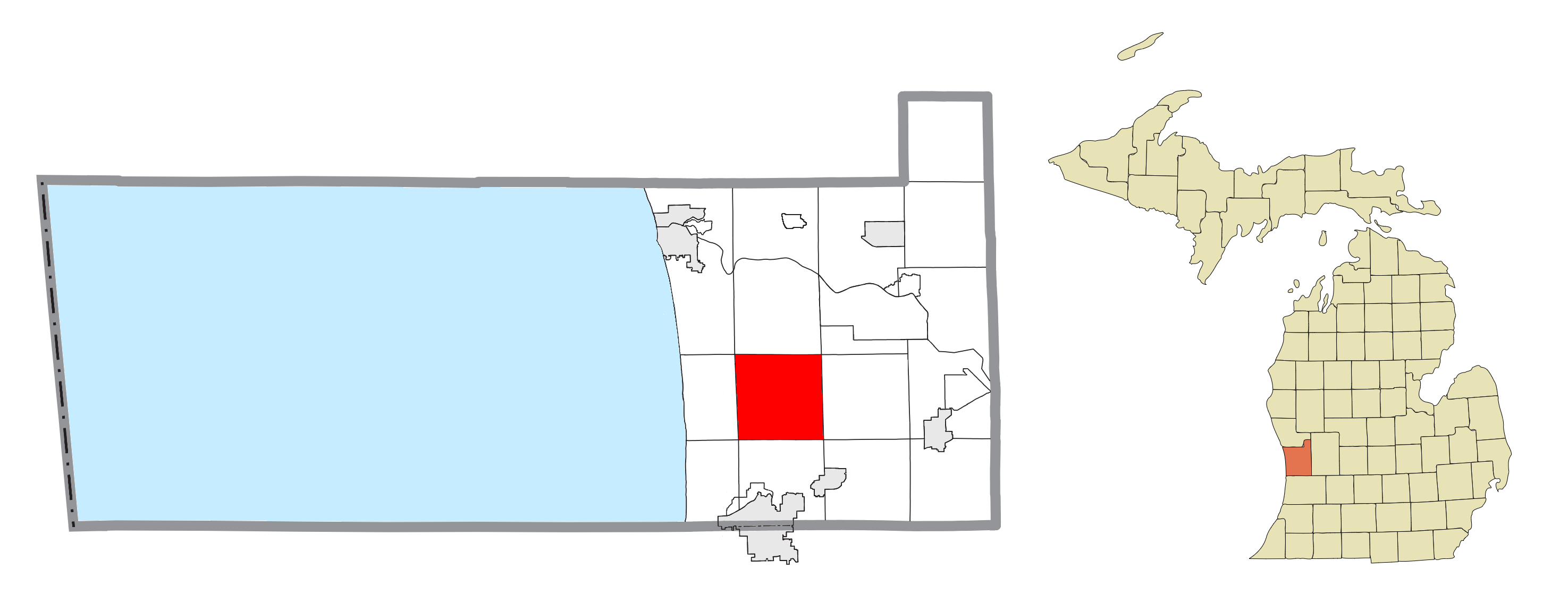
- Location within Ottawa County

- Location within the state of Michigan Location within the United States
- Coordinates: 42°53′46″N 86°05′09″W
- Country: United States
- State: Michigan
- County: Ottawa
- Established: 1857

Government
  - Supervisor: Al Nienhuis
  - Clerk: Lona Bronkema

Area
  - Total: 36.22 sq mi (93.81 km^{2})
  - Land: 36.18 sq mi (93.71 km^{2})
  - Water: 0.039 sq mi (0.10 km^{2})
- Elevation: 640 ft (195 m)

Population (2020)
  - Total: 5,007
  - Density: 138.4/sq mi (53.4/km^{2})
- Time zone: UTC-5 (Eastern (EST))
  - Summer (DST): UTC-4 (EDT)
- ZIP code(s): 49424 (Holland); 49460 (West Olive); 49464 (Zeeland)
- Area code: 616
- FIPS code: 26-60460
- GNIS feature ID: 1626841
- Website: Official website

Olive Township is a civil township of Ottawa County in the U.S. state of Michigan. The population was 5,007 at the 2020 census.

== Communities ==
- Crisp was a community formed by Dutch immigrants. It had a post office from 1893 until 1904.
- Harlem Station was a railroad station and area in the southern part of the Township.
- West Olive is an unincorporated community on the western boundary of the township with Port Sheldon Township at 42°55′17″N 86°08′47″W. It was platted by R. M. Paget in 1870 and given a post office on November 8, 1870. It was given a station on the Chicago and North Western Transportation Company in 1884. The West Olive ZIP code 49460 serves northern and western portions of Olive Township, as well as most of Port Sheldon Township and the southern portions of Grand Haven and Robinson townships.
- The city of Holland is to the south, Holland's ZIP code, 49424, serves the southern portions of Olive Township.
- The city of Zeeland is to the southeast. Zeeland's ZIP code, 49464, serves the eastern portion of Olive Township.

== Geography ==
According to the United States Census Bureau, the township has a total area of 36.2 square miles (93.8 km^{2}), of which 36.2 square miles (93.8 km^{2}) is land and 0.04 square mile (0.1 km^{2}) (0.06%) is water. The Pigeon River flows through the northern part of the township.

=== Ottawa County Fillmore Complex ===
The Ottawa County Fillmore complex is located in Olive Township. The Fillmore complex contains a number of county offices, including the county jail, the sheriff's office, the central dispatch authority, and the county clerk's office.

== Demographics ==
Historical population
Census	Pop.	Note	%±
2000	4,691		—
2010	4,375		−6.7%
2020	5,007		14.4%
U.S. Decennial Census

As of the census of 2010, there were 4,375 people, 1,406 households, and 1,147 families residing in the township. The population density was 129.6 inhabitants per square mile (50.0/km^{2}). There were 1,414 housing units at an average density of 39.1 per square mile (15.1/km^{2}). The racial makeup of the township was 86.02% White, 2.70% African American, 0.60% Native American, 1.40% Asian, 7.30% from other races, and 1.80% from two or more races. Hispanic or Latino of any race were 13.52% of the population.

There were 1,406 households, out of which 40.3% had children under the age of 18 living with them, 70.3% were married couples living together, 6.2% had a female householder with no husband present, and 18.4% were non-families. 14.3% of all households were made up of individuals, and 15.3% had someone living alone who was 65 years of age or older. The average household size was 3.12 and the average family size was 3.41.

In the township the population was spread out, with 31.3% under the age of 19, 7.2% from 20 to 24, 7.2% from 25 to 29, 47.1% from 30 to 64, and 6.7% who were 65 years of age or older. The median age was 32.8 years.

The median income for a household in the township was $61,176 and the median income for a family was $68,750. The per capita income for the township was $20,613. About 6.9% of families and 6.7% of the population were below the poverty line, including 12% of those under age 18 and 0.0% of those age 65 or over.
