= West Ottawa Public Schools =

School district in Michigan

Address
- 1138 136th Avenue Holland, Ottawa, Michigan, 49424; United States

District information
- Grades: Pre-Kindergarten-12
- Superintendent: Tim Bearden
- Schools: 13
- Budget: $137,733,000 2022-2023 expenditures
- NCES District ID: 2635910

Students and staff
- Students: 6,757 (2024-2025)
- Teachers: 426.9 FTE (2024-2025)
- Staff: 916.17 FTE (2024-2025)
- Student–teacher ratio: 15.83 (2024-2025)

Other information
- Website: www.westottawa.net

West Ottawa Public Schools is a public school district in Ottawa County, Michigan. It serves a suburban and exurban area between Holland and Grand Haven. The district includes most of Park, Olive, Port Sheldon and Holland townships.

== History ==
For decades, thirteen small K-8 districts north of Lake Macatawa had sent their children to Holland High School. However, in 1956, a study by Michigan State University found this area was growing faster than Holland. In response, the Holland school board demanded that the northern areas fully merge into Holland Public Schools. Instead, in 1957, they voted to cut all ties with Holland Public Schools and merge into a single K-12 district in order to have a high school of their own. High school students held classes at the Beechwood school from 1958 until Suburban High School, later renamed West Ottawa High School, was completed in fall 1961. The building became Harbor Lights Middle School when a new high school was built.

In 1999, a middle school was built at 3600 152nd Avenue. It became West Ottawa High School South when High School North opened on the same site in fall 2005. The middle school program housed there, Harbor Lights Middle School, moved to the former high school. North and South high schools are one high school in two separate buildings on the same campus. High School North's architect was Design Plus/Progressive Architecture and Engineering.

West Ottawa's football stadium opened in fall 2022, replacing a smaller facility. Costing $20-$25 million, it seats about 7,000 and also features an adjacent soccer stadium. In 2023, it was recognized as the top multi-field stadium in the country by American Sports Builders Association and was ranked as one of the best high school stadiums in Michigan by The Detroit News.

In 2024, a 1,200-seat auditorium opened at High School North.

== Schools ==
Schools in West Ottawa Public Schools district
School	Address	Notes
Riley Farms Elementary	2612 120th Ave., Holland	Grades K-5. Opening fall 2025.
Woodside Elementary	2591 N. Division Ave., Holland	Grades PreK-5
Waukazoo Elementary	1294 W. Lakewood Blvd., Holland	Grades PreK-5
Sheldon Woods Elementary	15050 Blair, West Olive	Grades PreK-5
Pine Creek Elementary	1184 136th Ave., Holland	Grades PreK-5
North Holland Elementary	11946 New Holland St., Holland	Grades K-5
Lakewood Elementary	2134 W. Lakewood Blvd., Holland	Grades PreK-5
Lakeshore Elementary	3765 N. 168 Ave., Holland	Grades PreK-5
Great Lakes Elementary	3200 152nd Ave., Holland	Grades PreK-5
West Ottawa High School	3685 Buttnernut Dr., Holland	Grades 9-12. Consists of High School North and High School South on a single campus.
The Dunes Alternative High School	3685 Butternut Dr., Holland	Grades 9-12. Housed in West Ottawa High School North.
Harbor Lights Middle School	1024 136th Ave., Holland	Grades 6-8. Built 1961, formerly West Ottawa High School.
Macatawa Bay Middle School	3700 140th Ave., Holland	Grades 6-8
