= Macatawa River =

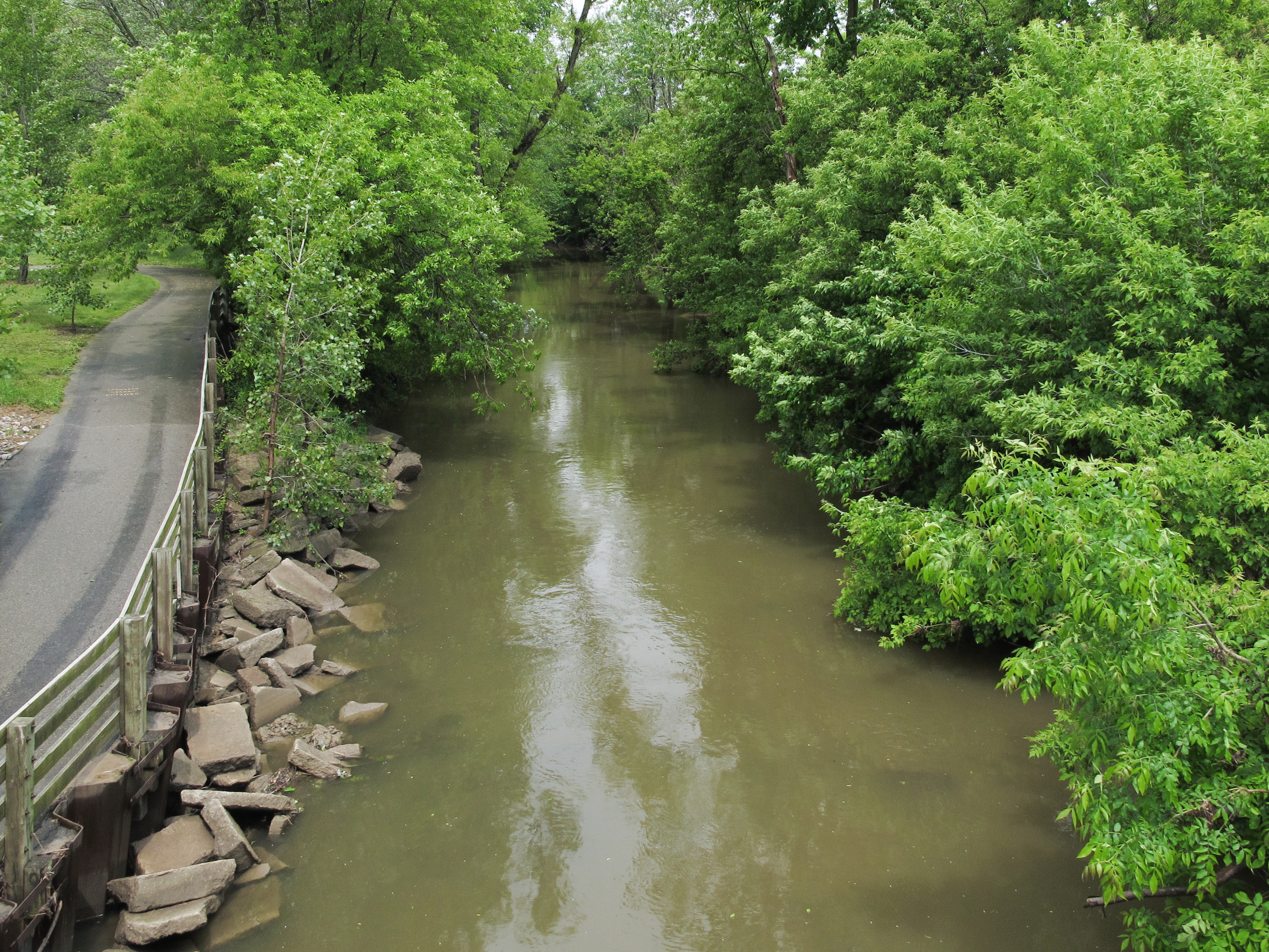
- The Macatawa River in Holland Township

Location
- Country: United States
- State: Michigan
- County: Ottawa County

Physical characteristics
- Source
  - location: Zeeland Township
  - coordinates: 42.85058°N 85.91337°W
- Mouth: Lake Macatawa
  - location: Holland
  - coordinates: 42.78891°N 86.12476°W
  - elevation: 581 ft (177 m)
- Length: 16.8 mi (27.0 km)
- Basin size: 174 mi^{2} (450 km^{2})

The Macatawa River (/ˌmækəˈtɑːwə/ mac-ə-TAH-wə), also known as the Black River, is located in the lower part of Ottawa County, Michigan, which drains into Lake Macatawa and eventually into Lake Michigan. The main stream is 16.8 miles (27.0 km) long.

Preluding the migration of Dutch settlers, the region was originally inhabited by three Anishinaabe nations: the Ottawa, Ojibwe, and Potawatomi. Together they comprised the Council of Three Fires who spoke the Algonquian languages. The indigenous name of the river is approximated to be the word “mak-a-tew-gamie”, meaning “black water” in the Ottawa dialect. Because they spoke oral languages, the name was written by the European immigrants in twenty-five variations, which led to the mis-phoneticized word Macatawa used today.

The Macatawa River Greenway is a corridor of land along the river including a number of private and public parcels that provides a green highway for wildlife and recreational opportunities for people along the water. Land along the Macatawa River open to the public includes: Upper Macatawa Natural Area, Hawthorn Pond, Adams Street Landing, Ridge Point Community Church Natural Area, Paw Paw Park, Windmill Island, Window on the Waterfront Park, Dunton Park, Kollen Park and Holland State Park.

A number of entities contribute to the management of the public areas along the Macatawa River Greenway including: Outdoor Discovery Center Macatawa Greenway (non-profit), Ottawa County Parks and Recreation Commission, City of Holland, Zeeland Township, Holland Township and Park Township.

== See also ==
- Lake Macatawa
