= Holland Harbor Light =

Lighthouse in Michigan, United States

Holland Harbor Light a/k/a "Big Red"
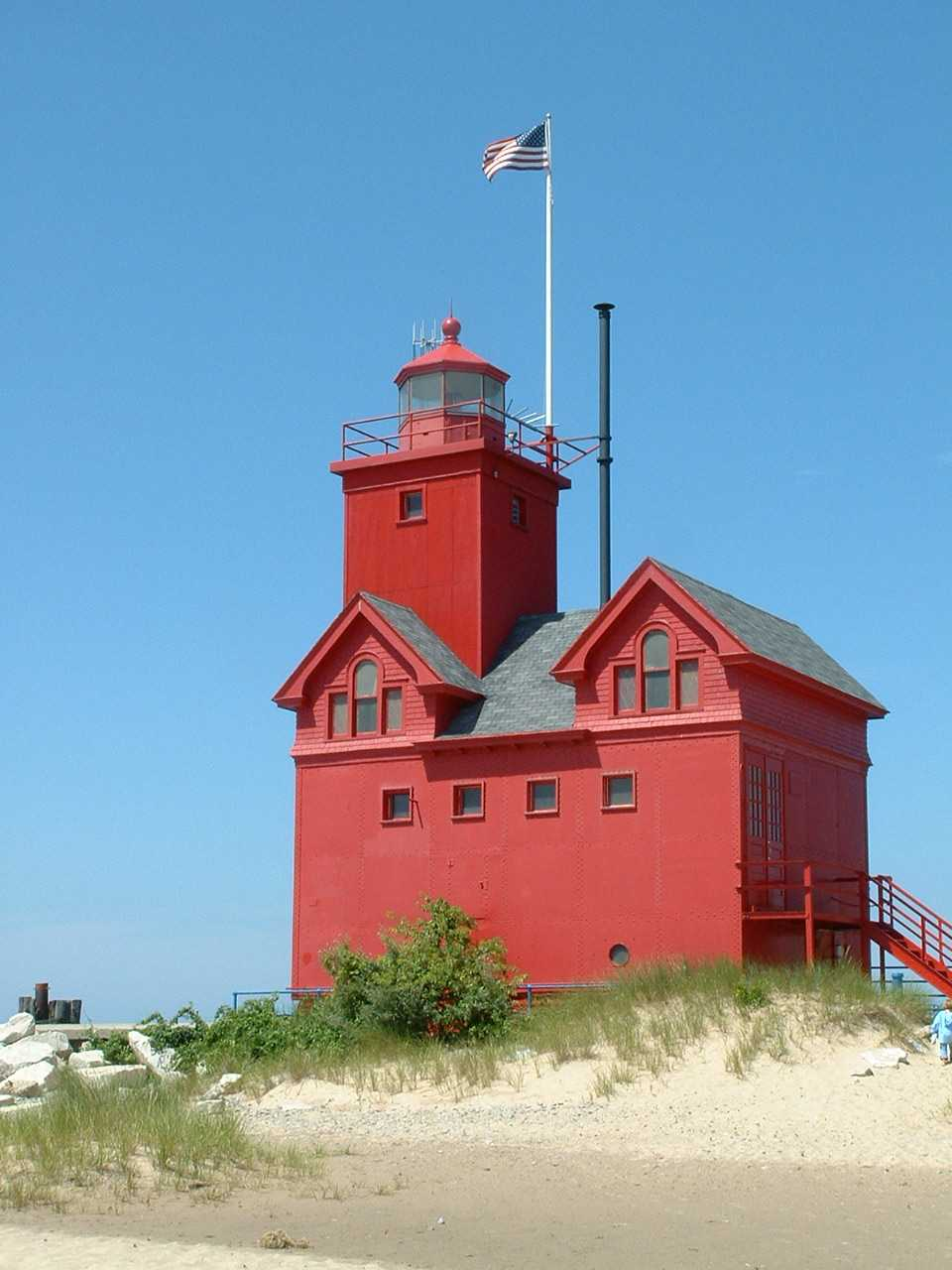
- Holland Harbor Light
- Location: Ottawa County, Michigan
- Coordinates: 42°46′21.7″N 86°12′44.7″W

Tower
- Constructed: 1870
- Foundation: Pier
- Construction: Wood
- Automated: 1970
- Height: 42 feet (13 m)
- Shape: Square
- Markings: Red
- Heritage: National Register of Historic Places listed place, Michigan State Historic Site

Light
- First lit: 1870
- Focal height: 15 m (49 ft)
- Lens: Fourth order Fresnel lens (removed)
- Range: 16 nmi (30 km; 18 mi) (white), 14 nmi (26 km; 16 mi) (red)
- Characteristic: Alt WR 10s
- Holland Harbor Lighthouse
- U.S. National Register of Historic Places
- Michigan State Historic Site
- Nearest city: Holland, Michigan
- Area: less than one acre
- Built: 1907
- NRHP reference No.: 78001509

Significant dates
- Added to NRHP: July 20, 1978
- Designated MSHS: January 16, 1976

The Holland Harbor Light, known as BIG RED, is located in Park Township, Michigan at the entrance of a channel connecting Lake Michigan with Lake Macatawa, and which gives access to the city of Holland, Michigan.

The lighthouse is on the south side of the channel. There are two modern lights marking the ends of the breakwaters that extend out into the Lake Michigan beyond the lighthouse.

== History ==
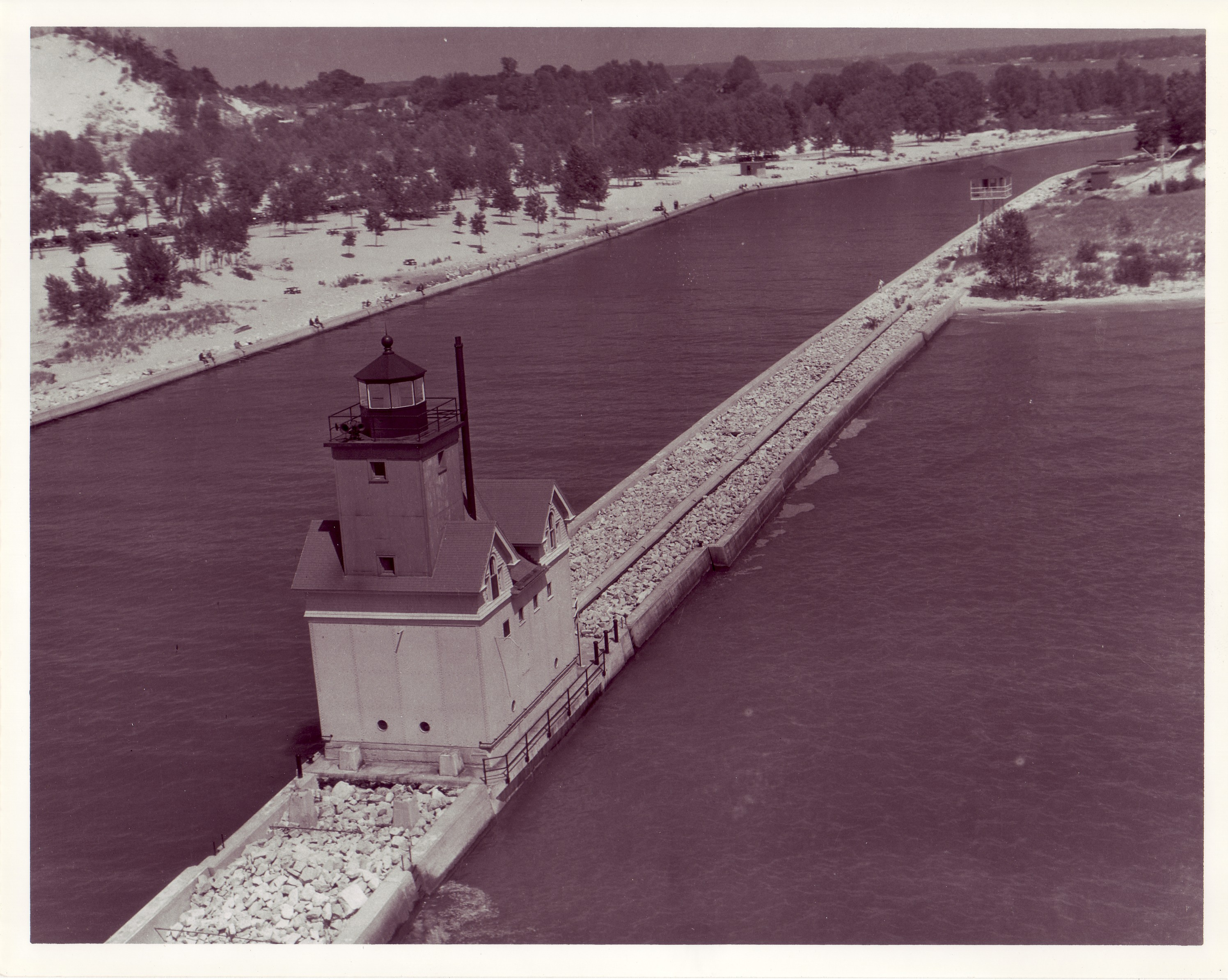
U.S. Coast Guard Archive Photo of Holland Harbor Pierhead Light

After decades of local requests that went unanswered, in 1870 the United States Lighthouse Board finally recommended construction of the first light at Holland Harbor. It was thereupon approved by the U.S. Congress.

The light was replaced by a standard steel beacon in 1902, and in 1907 the Coast Guard built a steam fog signal building with two keeper's rooms adjacent to the beacon. In 1936, the steel beacon light was relocated to Chicago, and the Fresnel lens was moved to a new tower built atop the fog signal building. That created the structure now known as the Holland Harbor Lighthouse. In 1978 the lighthouse was listed on the National Register of Historic Places.

Two identical Michigan State Historic Markers were erected in 1987, one on each side of the channel. Historical inaccuracies discovered in the early 2020s by historian and author Valerie van Heest led the Michigan Historical Commission to rewrite the text to improve accuracy and install one new marker at the Holland State Park in May 2026.

Text of the new marker reads: "The Reverend A. C. Van Raalte, leader of a group of Dutch emigrants, founded Holland in 1847 along Lake Macatawa near an Odawa village led by Chief Waukazoo. The Odawa moved to the Leelanau Peninsula in 1848 to protect their culture from the Dutch and avoid smallpox. Lake Macatawa’s outlet into Lake Michigan was difficult to navigate, so Van Raalte appealed to Congress to build a channel. The government surveyed the channel in 1849, but inadequate appropriations prevented its construction. Frustrated, the settlers dug their own channel, completing it in 1860. The government took over harbor development in 1867, adding a navigational beacon in 1870 and a life-saving station in 1886. Resort expansion and increased commercial traffic in the late nineteenth century prompted further improvements to the harbor, which were completed by 1909.

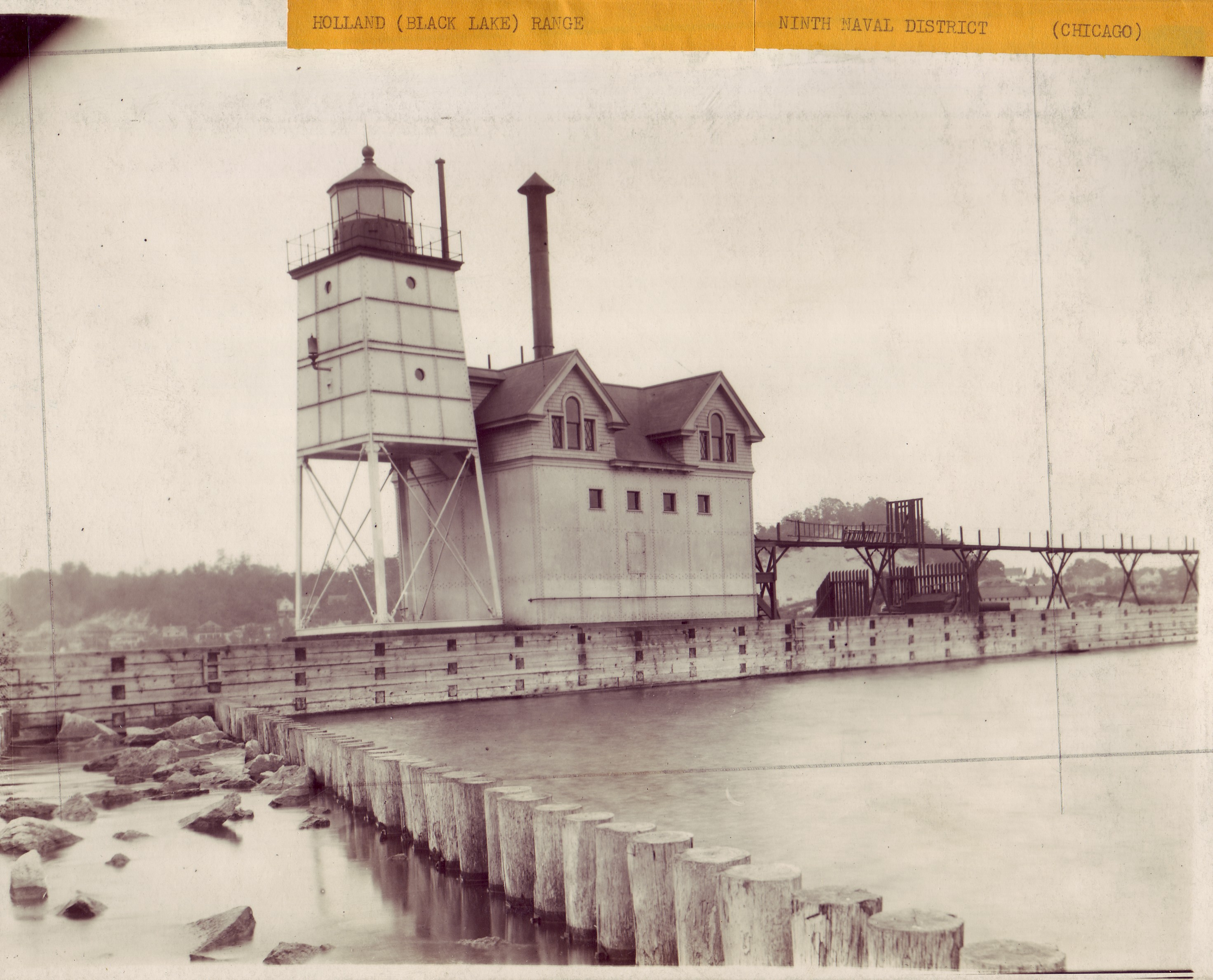
U.S. Coast Guard Archive Photo of the 1902 beacon and 1907 fog signal building

In 1870 the federal government erected a wooden tower with a fifth-order Fresel lens. A prefabricated steel structure replaced the original tower in 1902. A larger fourth order Fresnel lens and adjacent two-story steam-powered fog signal building were added in 1907 and included two keepers’ rooms. The light was later electrified, and an electric air horn replaced the steam whistle in 1934. A tower built atop the fog signal building combined the horn and light into one structure in 1936, resulting in the current lighthouse, which was painted red in 1956 to meet new regulations. The U. S. Coast Guard deemed it obsolete in 1970. To preserve the lighthouse, citizens formed the Holland Harbor Lighthouse Historical Commission in 1974 and began calling it “Big Red.”

Except for its color, it is a virtual twin of the Kewaunee Pierhead Light on the Wisconsin side of Lake Michigan.

In 2007, the United States Department of the Interior announced that the Holland Harbor Light would be protected, making it the 12th Michigan lighthouse to have such status.

Today the nonprofit Holland Harbor Lighthouse Historic Commission owns and operates the lighthouse, serving as its primary steward, advocate, and guardian, responsible for her preservation, maintenance, and ongoing public engagement. It maintains a detailed history at its website bigredlighthouse.com.

== Accessibility ==
Public access to BIG RED is restricted due to the fact one must cross private property to see the lighthouse up close. The best vantage points that are accessible to the general public are from across the channel at Holland State Park.

== See also ==
- Lighthouses in the United States
