= West Ottawa High School =

High school in Holland, Michigan, United States

Location
- 3685 Butternut Drive; Holland, Michigan 49424; United States; 42°50′08″N 86°09′10″W

Information
- Type: Public
- Established: 1958; 2005 (current building)
- School district: West Ottawa Public Schools
- Superintendent: Tim Bearden
- Principal: Kristine Jernigan
- Staff: 99.95 (on an FTE basis)
- Grades: 9-12
- Enrollment: 2,166 (2020-21)
- Student to teacher ratio: 21.67
- Colors: Black; White
- Athletics: MHSAA Class A, D-1
- Athletics conference: OK Conference; Red Division
- Nickname: Panthers
- Rival: Grand Haven High School; Holland High School
- Newspaper: The West Ottawan
- Yearbook: Icon
- Website: School website

Student assessments
- 2021–22 school year Change vs. prior year

M-STEP 11th grade proficiency rates (Science / Social Studies)
- Advanced %: 21.9 / 14.9
- Proficient %: 21.9 / 34.4
- PR. Proficient %: 16.3 / 37.7
- Not Proficient %: 39.9 / 13.0

Average test scores
- SAT Total: 964.4 (▼ −61.1)

West Ottawa High School is located in Park Township, Michigan, with a mailing address in Holland. It is one of the four high schools in the Holland area (along with Holland High School, Holland Christian High School and Black River Public School.)

== History ==
The high school was founded in 1958, a year after 13 small K-8 districts north of Holland merged into a single K-12 district. For years, these districts had sent their children to Holland High School, but Holland Public Schools insisted on a full merger after finding out the rural areas were outgrowing the city. After four years of holding classes at the former school building in Beechwood, the first dedicated building opened on 136th Avenue in Park Township in 1961. Originally named Suburban High School, it later changed its name to West Ottawa High School. The school moved to its current building in 2005, while the old high school building is now home to Harbor Lights Middle School.

A new section of the high school was constructed and completed in 2005 due to the large student body at the school (about 2,500 students, the largest in Ottawa County). The current campus now consists of two buildings approximately 500 yards apart. In February 2022, Kristine Jernigan became the first female principal of West Ottawa.

== Academics ==
West Ottawa offers Advanced Placement (AP) courses and an International Baccalaureate (IB) program.

Students also have the opportunity to participate in dual-enrollment programs with area colleges. Participating colleges include Davenport University, Grand Valley State University, Grand Rapids Community College, Hope College, and Kendall College of Art and Design.

== Arts ==
In 2007, West Ottawa was awarded the Grammy Foundation Signature School. West Ottawa was selected as a nationwide finalist in 2010.

=== Band and Orchestra ===
The West Ottawa Band and Orchestra program is divided into three bands (Symphony, Wind Symphony, and Concert) and three orchestras (Concert Orchestra, Symphony Orchestra, and Chamber Orchestra).

The West Ottawa Marching Panthers participate in the Michigan School Band & Orchestra Association (MSBOA) District 10 Marching Festival, the area Christmas Parade, Tulip Time Parades, and Memorial Day Parade.

The high school is home to the West Ottawa Percussion Ensemble, which was named best in the state in 2007 and 2008, and was given the opportunity to perform at the Michigan Youth Arts Festival at Western Michigan University.

=== Choir ===
Choirs include the Vocalaires, Men Of West Ottawa, West Ottawa Select Women's Ensemble, Bella Voce and Concert Choir.

=== Theatre ===
Each year, West Ottawa Theatre presents 3 productions: a large-scale fall musical, a large-scale winter or spring play, and a middle school musical. West Ottawa is Troupe 5081 in the International Thespian Society.

== Athletics ==
The West Ottawa varsity baseball team won the 2003 MHSAA state championship.

The girls swimming team was the MHSAA Division 1 state champion in 2012.

== Demographics ==
The demographic breakdown of the 2,166 students enrolled in 2020-21 was:

- Male - 53.0%
- Female - 47.0%
- Native American - 0.3%
- Asian - 7.8%
- Black - 3.0%
- Hispanic - 37.2%
- Pacific Islander - 0.1%
- White - 46.9%
- Multiracial - 4.8%

In addition, 797 students (36.8%) were eligible for reduced-price or free lunch.

== Notable people ==
- Tony Annese – former West Ottawa assistant football coach; head football coach at Ferris State University
- Margo Jonker – alumna and former West Ottawa softball coach; former head softball coach at Central Michigan University and assistant coach for the gold medal-winning United States team at the 2000 Summer Olympics
- Desmond Morgan – 2011 alumnus; former Michigan Wolverines linebacker and college football coach
- Rob Renes – alumnus; former Michigan Wolverines nose tackle, 1999 first-team All-American and team co-captain
- Jake Van Tubbergen – 2017 alumnus; professional basketball player and former NCAA Division II All-American at Grand Valley State
- Matt Vanderbeek – alumnus; former NFL linebacker and Super Bowl XXVIII champion with the Dallas Cowboys
