= Erica Francis =

American news anchor

Erica Francis is a news anchor from WFLA-TV in Tampa, Florida

== Early life and education ==
Francis is from Holland, Michigan. She went to West Ottawa High School. She earned an undergraduate degree from Central Michigan University in applied arts, broadcast and cinematic arts in 2015.

== Career ==
Following graduation, she worked at WXMI-TV in Grand Rapids, Michigan for four years before becoming a news anchor at WKRN-TV in Nashville, Tennessee. In July 2022, she joined WJBK in Detroit, Michigan, where she had previously served as an intern before joining WFLA in October 2026.
