= Roelof Smit =

Roelof Smit may refer to:

- Roelof Smit (minister) (1815–1886)
- Roelof Smit (rugby union) (b. 1993)
