= Aardsma =

Disambiguation page

Aardsma is a Dutch surname. Notable people with the surname include:

- Betsy Aardsma (1947–1969), famous unsolved murder victim
- David Aardsma (born 1981), American baseball player
