= GHP =

GHP may refer to:

- Gandhi Heritage Portal
- Gas hydrate pingo, a submarine landform
- A General History of the Pyrates
- Georgia Governor's Honors Program, in the state of Georgia, in the United States
- Geothermal heat pump
- GHP formalism, in general relativity
- Go Home Productions, a British bootlegger
- Great Hungarian Plain
- Green Highways Partnership, in the United States
- The Greenhouse Project, in Uganda
- Greater Houston Partnership, in Texas, United States
