= Bob Armstrong (basketball, born 1933) =

American basketball player

Personal information
- Born: June 17, 1933 Detroit, Michigan, U.S.
- Died: January 5, 2016 (aged 82) Plymouth, Michigan, U.S.
- Listed height: 6 ft 8 in (2.03 m)
- Listed weight: 220 lb (100 kg)

Career information
- High school: Holland (Holland, Michigan)
- College: Michigan State (1951–1955)
- NBA draft: 1955: 12th round, 87th overall pick
- Drafted by: Rochester Royals
- Playing career: 1956–1957
- Position: Power forward / center
- Number: 19

Career history
- 1956–1957: Philadelphia Warriors

Career statistics
- Points: 28 (1.5 ppg)
- Rebounds: 39 (2.1 rpg)
- Assists: 3 (0.2 apg)
- Stats at NBA.com
- Stats at Basketball Reference

Theodore Robert Armstrong (June 17, 1933 – January 5, 2016) was an American basketball player.

Born in Detroit, Michigan, he played collegiately for Michigan State University.

He was selected by the Rochester Royals in the 1955 NBA draft.

He played for the Philadelphia Warriors (1956–1957) in the NBA for 19 games.

== Career statistics ==
Legend
GP	Games played	GS	Games started	MPG	Minutes per game
FG%	Field goal percentage	3P%	3-point field goal percentage	FT%	Free throw percentage
RPG	Rebounds per game	APG	Assists per game	SPG	Steals per game
BPG	Blocks per game	PPG	Points per game	**Bold**	Career high

=== NBA ===
==== Regular season ====
Year	Team	GP	MPG	FG%	FT%	RPG	APG	PPG
1956–57	Philadelphia	19	5.8	.297	.500	2.1	.2	1.5
