= Holland Public Schools =

Public school district in Holland, Michigan, United States

Address
- 320 W 24th Street Holland, Ottawa, Michigan, 49423; United States
- Coordinates: 42°46′31.4″N 86°07′19.7″W

District information
- Type: Public
- Grades: PreK-12
- Established: 1848; 178 years ago
- Superintendent: Nick Cassidy
- Budget: $64,729,000 2022-2023 expenditures
- NCES District ID: 2618420

Students and staff
- Enrollment: 2,878 (2024-2025)
- Faculty: 209.28 FTE (2024-2025)
- Staff: 502.95 (on an FTE basis) (2024-2025)
- Student–teacher ratio: 13.75 (2024-2025)

Other information
- Website: www.hollandpublicschools.org

Holland Public Schools is a public school district headquartered in Holland, Michigan. It serves portions of southern Ottawa County and northern Allegan County. In addition to almost all of Holland, which spills into both counties, it serves parts of Holland and Park townships in Ottawa County and part of Laketown Township in Allegan County. The district offers classes in the common core curriculum alongside other programs like art, music, athletics, theater, forensics, K-12 Spanish, technology literacy, special education, English as a second language, and extra-curricular activities.

== History ==
The district was founded in 1848. In 1912, a high school was built at 96 W 15th Street.

The present high school building opened in February 1962. It was substantially reconstructed in 2013. The middle school opened in 1990.

By 2000, the district had nine elementary schools, but due to declining enrollment, Lincoln Elementary closed in 2001, Lakeview and Washington Elementaries closed in 2003, Longfellow in 2006, and Harrington, Maplewood and Van Raalte Elementaries closed in 2009.

== Schools ==
Schools in Holland Public Schools district
School	Address	Notes
Holland Heights School	45 E 25th Street, Holland	Grades PreK-5. Temporarily located at Longfellow School.
Jefferson Elementary	282 West 30th Street, Holland	Grades PreK-5
West Elementary	500 W. 24th Street, Holland	Grades PreK-5
Holland Language Academy	461 Van Raalte Avenue, Holland	Grades PreK–5. Two-Way Bilingual Immersion
Holland Middle School	373 E 24th Street, Holland	Grades 6–8
VR Tech School	600 VanRaalte Avenue, Holland	Online high school.
Holland High School	600 VanRaalte Avenue, Holland	Grades 9–12
