= Dirk Van Raalte =

American politician (1844–1910)

Dirk B.K. Van Raalte
- Born: March 1, 1844
- Died: February 10, 1910 (aged 65)
- Military career
- Allegiance: United States of America
- Branch: Union Army
- Unit: 25th Michigan Volunteer Infantry Regiment
- Conflicts: Battle of Atlanta

Dirk B.K. Van Raalte (March 1, 1844 – February 10, 1910) was a Union soldier during the American Civil War and served as a member of the Michigan State Legislature for three different terms. Van Raalte was an active member in the community of Holland, Michigan, as a local businessman. He died from pneumonia and is buried in Pilgrim Home Cemetery.

== Early life ==
Born on March 1, 1844, in Ommen Netherlands, Van Raalte was the fifth of ten total children of Albertus van Raalte and Christina Van Raalte; seven of those ten children survived into adulthood: three boys and four girls. He was named after a business partner of his father Albertus, who founded Holland, Michigan, and Hope College.

== Military service ==
Van Raalte enlisted in the army a week after his older brother, Benjamin enlisted on August 20, 1862. The decision to enlist was supported by his father, Albertus, who encouraged Dutch boys to enlist. Christina, his mother, was not thrilled to have two of her three sons enlisted in the army. Christina would send both him and Benjamin treats along with extra clothes even against their wishes. In a letter home Benjamin explains "If I need anything I will write for it. Mother must not send me anything unless I ask for it." Van Raalte was part of the 25th Michigan Volunteer Infantry Regiment. During his time of service he lost an arm during the Battle of Atlanta. While riding his horse through the woods, trying to deliver a message, Van Raalte was ambushed by Confederate soldiers and was shot in the forearm and shoulder after attempting to escape on horseback. His wounds led to the amputation of his right arm from the shoulder down. His family received the news of his injury through a letter written home on August 30, 1864, composed by Van Raalte himself, with help from his brother Benjamin. The horse Van Raalte was riding during the time of his injury was black, so for the rest of his life he refused to ride anything other than a black horse. After hearing the news of his son's injury, Albertus attempted to go south and bring his son back, but did not make it past Nashville, Tennessee, before being told to turn around by soldiers guarding the city.

Van Raalte began as a private in the army and was discharged as a hospital steward on April 13, 1865. He returned to Holland the spring after the war's close in 1865. All the letters from both Van Raalte and his brother Benjamin corresponding during the war can be found in collection 300 in Calvin College's Heritage Hall known as The Van Raalte papers.

== Michigan State Legislature ==
In October 1880 Van Raalte married Kate Ledeboer, the sister of Willie Ledeboer a man who was in his regiment during the war. Together they had two sons, Albertus Christiaan (1889-1944) and D.B.K Junior (1891-1964). The couple lived in the family house which Van Raalte purchased in 1875. Albertus married Edna Dean Pillsbury (1889-1984), who is a 6th Cousin to the Twin Sons of the Co-Founder of Pillsbury Company, Charles Alfred Pillsbury. During his tenure on the state legislature, which began twelve years after his discharge from the military, Van Raalte served two consecutive terms, and then return for a third term in 1909 until his death in 1910. His primary job on the legislature was serving on committee of ways and means. Van Raalte was well-liked by everyone on the legislature from all the different political parties. One fellow member is quoted as saying "Van Raalte is no mean opponent in scathing debate, and the representatives who can better him in sarcasm and ironical oratory may be counted upon the fingers of a single hand."
