= Jake Van Tubbergen =

American basketball player (born 1998)

No. 2 – San-en NeoPhoenix
- Position: Small forward
- League: B.League Premier

Personal information
- Born: September 3, 1998 (age 28) Holland, Michigan, U.S.
- Listed height: 6 ft 8 in (2.03 m)
- Listed weight: 210 lb (95 kg)

Career information
- High school: West Ottawa (Holland, Michigan)
- College: Grand Valley State (2017–2022)
- NBA draft: 2022: undrafted
- Playing career: 2022–present

Career history
- 2022–2023: Vitória Alves Guimarães
- 2023–2024: Imortal Albufeira
- 2024–2025: Ironi Ness Ziona
- 2025–2026: Peristeri
- 2026-present: San-en NeoPhoenix

Career highlights
- Division II All-American – NABC (2020); GLIAC Freshman of the Year (2018); 3× First-team All-GLIAC (2020–2022); 2× Second-team All-GLIAC (2018, 2019)

Jacob Nicholas Van Tubbergen (born September 3, 1998) is an American professional basketball player for the San-en NeoPhoenix of the B.League Premier. He played college basketball for Grand Valley State University, with whom he was an National Association of Basketball Coaches (NABC) D2 All-American.

== Early and personal life ==
Van Tubbergen hails from Holland, Michigan. His parents are Scott and Kathy Van Tubbergen.

== High school ==
Van Tubbergen attended West Ottawa High School ('17) in Holland, Michigan. Playing forward for the school's basketball team, the West Ottawa Panthers, as a junior, he averaged 16.3 points, 7.3 rebounds, 2.4 assists, and 1.4 steals per game. He also shot 56 percent from the field, 72 percent at the line, and 38 percent from three-point range. He was named to the All-OK Red Conference Team.

As a senior, he was team captain and averaged 18.9 points, 8.6 rebounds, 3.0 assists, 1.6 steals, and 1.1 blocks per game. He shot 64 percent from the field, 72 percent from the line, and 45 percent from beyond the arc. Van Tubbergen received AP All-State Second Team honors, and was named All-Conference, Holland Sentinel 1st Team, Basketball Coaches of Michigan (BCAM) 1st Team, Grand Rapids Press-MLive 1st Team Dream Team, and to the Basketball Coaches Association of Michigan academic all-state team with a 3.59 GPA. In 2020, The West Ottawan chose him as the #1 basketball player in West Ottawa High School history.

Van Tubbergen also played two years of football in high school.

== College ==
Van Tubbergen attended Grand Valley State University ('22) in Allendale, Michigan, on a full scholarship, and played for its basketball team the Grand Valley State Lakers for five years.

As a freshman in 2017–18, due to a stress fracture and sprain of his ankle Van Tubbergen missed the first few weeks of the season. He averaged 11.4 points and 6.6 rebounds per game, while shooting .561 from the floor (fifth in the Great Lakes Intercollegiate Athletic Conference (GLIAC)). He was named GLIAC Freshman of the Year and Second Team All-GLIAC.

As a sophomore in 2018–19, he averaged 14.3 points and 6.8 rebounds per game, while shooting .533 from the floor. Van Tubbergen was named to the preseason All-GLIAC South Division team, and second team All-GLIAC.

As a junior in 2019–20, Van Tubbergen averaged 18.4 points (4th in the conference), 10.0 rebounds (leading the conference), and 2.6 offensive rebounds (leading the conference) per game, as he shot .542 from the field (5th) and had 14 double-doubles, which ranked 14th in the nation. He had 551 total points (10th in GVSU history for a single season), and 300 rebounds (8th). His 39 points against Northern Michigan on February 20, 2020, was the highest single-game point total by a Laker since 1997. By January 2020, he had put on 30 pounds since his freshman year, when he was rather skinny. He was named an National Association of Basketball Coaches (NABC) D2 All-American (the first Lakers player so named in 11 seasons), D2CCA NCAA D2 honorable mention All-American, 2020 D2CCA NCAA D2 All-Midwest Region First Team, unanimous first team All-Region, and first team All-GLIAC.

As a senior in 2021 he averaged 13.6 points and 8.0 rebounds per game, with an .810 free throw percentage (5th in the conference). Van Tubbergen was named preseason GLIAC Player of the Year, Basketball Times preseason player of the year, and first team All-GLIAC.

Van Tubbergen opted to take an extra year of NCAA eligibility, which the NCAA offered athletes due to the COVID-19 pandemic. In 2021–22, he averaged 17.2 points and 10.6 rebounds per game while shooting .541 from the field. He was named NABC D2 All-District Midwest First Team and first team All-GLIAC. In January 2022, he grabbed his 1,000th career college rebound. He finished his career with 2,005 career points, fourth on the Grand Valley State all-time list.

== Professional career ==
=== Vitoria Alves Guimaraes ===
In 2022–23, Van Tubbergen played for Vitória Alves Guimarães of the Liga Portuguesa de Basquetebol. He averaged 14.9 points and 5.6 rebounds per game, while shooting .564 from the field and .815 from the line.

=== Imortal Albufeira ===
In 2023–24, he played for Imortal Albufeira of the Liga Portuguesa de Basquetebol, with whom he signed on December 12, 2023. Van Tubbergen averaged 19.4 points (2nd in the league) and 7.6 rebounds (9th) per game, while shooting .548 from the field and .478 (4th) from the three point line. He received the 2024 Eurobasket.com All-Portuguese Liga Betclic Second Team Award.

=== Ironi Ness Ziona ===
Van Tubbergen signed to play for Ironi Ness Ziona of the Israeli Basketball Premier League.

=== Peristeri ===
On June 26, 2025, Van Tubbergen signed with Peristeri of the Greek Basketball League. On December 11th, he received a Hoops Agents Player of the Week award. He had a double-double of 19 points and 11 rebounds.

=== San-en Neophoenix ===
In 2026, Van Tubbergen signed with the San-en NeoPhoenix of the B.League Premier. On September 27, he logged a career-high 31 bench points against the Ibaraki Robots.
