= Kewaunee Pierhead Light =

Lighthouse in Wisconsin, United States

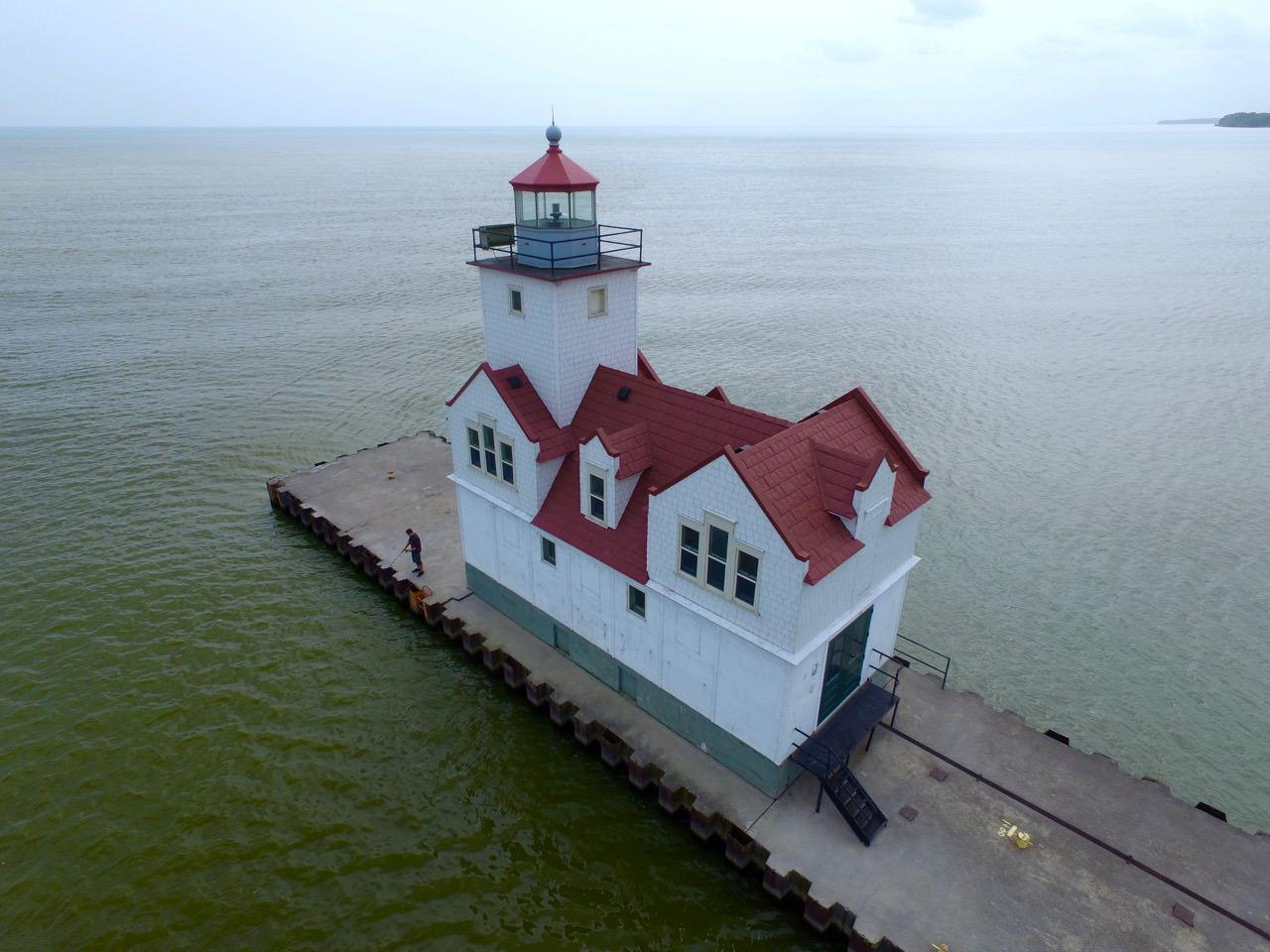
- Location: Kewaunee, Wisconsin
- Coordinates: 44°27′26.67″N 87°29′34.4″W

Tower
- Constructed: 1912/1931
- Foundation: Pier
- Construction: Steel and brick, wood frame upper
- Automated: 1981
- Height: 43 feet (13 m)
- Shape: Square
- Heritage: National Register of Historic Places listed place, listed in the Wisconsin State Register of Historic Places

Light
- First lit: 1931
- Focal height: 13.5 m (44 ft)
- Lens: Fifth order Fresnel lens
- Range: 15 nautical miles (28 km; 17 mi)
- Characteristic: White, Fixed

The Kewaunee Pierhead lighthouse is a lighthouse located near Kewaunee in Kewaunee County, Wisconsin. The lighthouse looks nearly identical to the Holland Harbor Lighthouse, except that it is colored white.

== History ==
The original light marking the entrance to Kewaunee was established in 1889 on the North pier.

In 1912, the current South pier was built. The lighthouse was built as an open frame tower with a fog signal building immediately behind it, connected by a 2nd floor corridor. The tower was equipped with a fifth order Fresnel lens and the fog signal building supplied compressed air to a 10" diameter chime fog whistle, manufactured by Crosby Steam Gauge and Valve Company.

In 1919, the compressed air whistle was replaced by a compressed air Type F Diaphone fog horn. A 1972 recording of the fog horn was inducted into the National Recording Registry in the Library of Congress in 2005.

In 1931, the open frame tower was removed a tower was built out of the roof of the fog signal building, giving the lighthouse the appearance it has now. The old open frame tower was later reconstructed as the Chicago Harbor Southeast Guidewall Lighthouse, where it still stands today.

The lighthouse was automated in 1981. It was listed on the National Register of Historic Places in 2022.

== Current status ==
The City of Kewaunee was granted ownership of the lighthouse in September 2011, as part of the National Historic Lighthouse Preservation Act (NHLPA). The Friends of the Kewaunee Pierhead Lighthouse was established as a 501(c)(3) non-profit organization and works to raise funds to restore the lighthouse.

The Fresnel lens remained until June 6, 2019, when it was replaced with a Vega Industries VLB-44 LED light. The US Coast Guard maintains the light and the electronic fog horn.

The Fresnel lens was moved and placed on display at the Kewaunee County History Center located at 217 Ellis St.

The lighthouse is in the process of being restored and is occasionally open for tours.

== Gallery ==
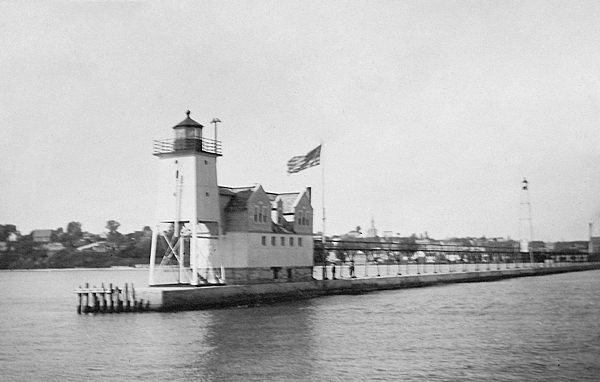
The configuration of the lighthouse from 1912 - 1931, with an open frame tower and the fog signal building behind it. This photo was taken in 1914 when the fog signal was a 10" diameter compressed air whistle

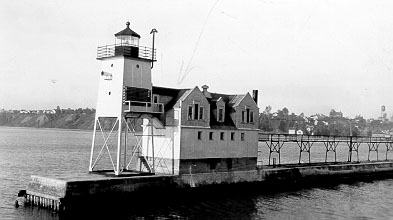
The configuration of the lighthouse from 1912 - 1931, with an open frame tower and the fog signal building behind it. This photo was taken between 1919 and 1930 when the fog signal was a compressed air diaphone.

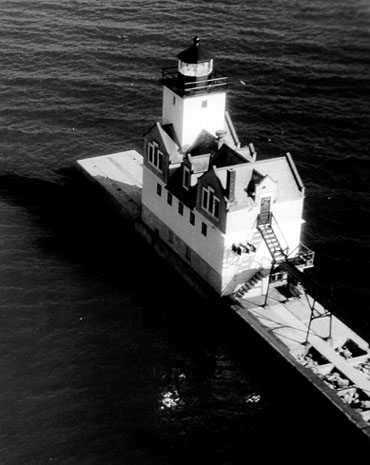
The lighthouse as seen after the tower was built into the roof of the fog signal building. This change occurred in 1931 and left the lighthouse looking as it does today. This image was taken in the 1950s, prior to the pier being widened and capped.

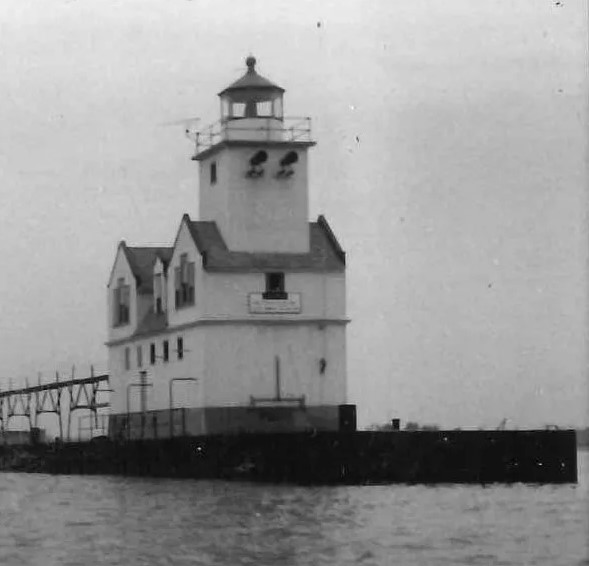
Kewaunee Lighthouse in 1965 at the completion of the pier widening and capping project. The dual diaphones are visible as well as the Fresnel Lens.

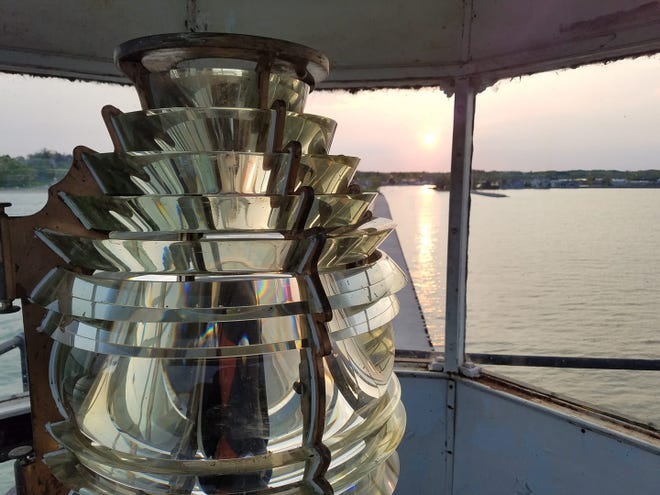
The 5th order Fresnel Lens in Kewaunee's Pierhead lighthouse sees one of its last sunsets before being removed from the tower

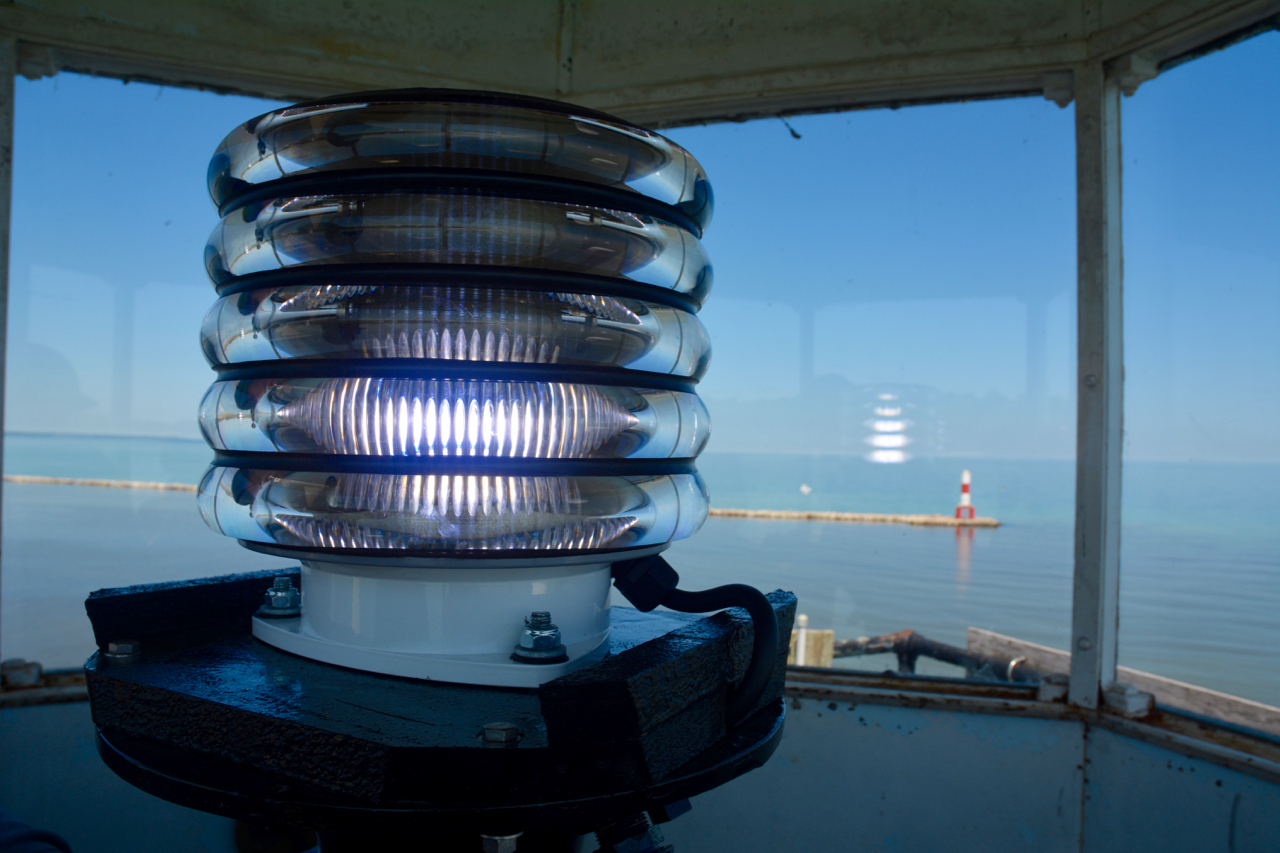
The new 5 tier LED (Vega VLB-44) light installed by the US Coast Guard on June 6, 2019

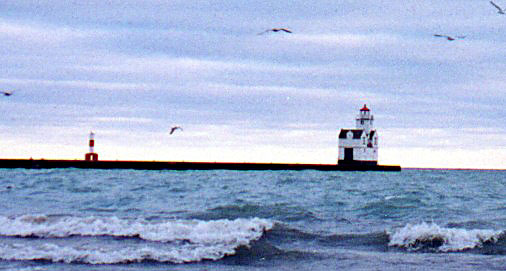
