= Holland State Park =

Park in Michigan, USA

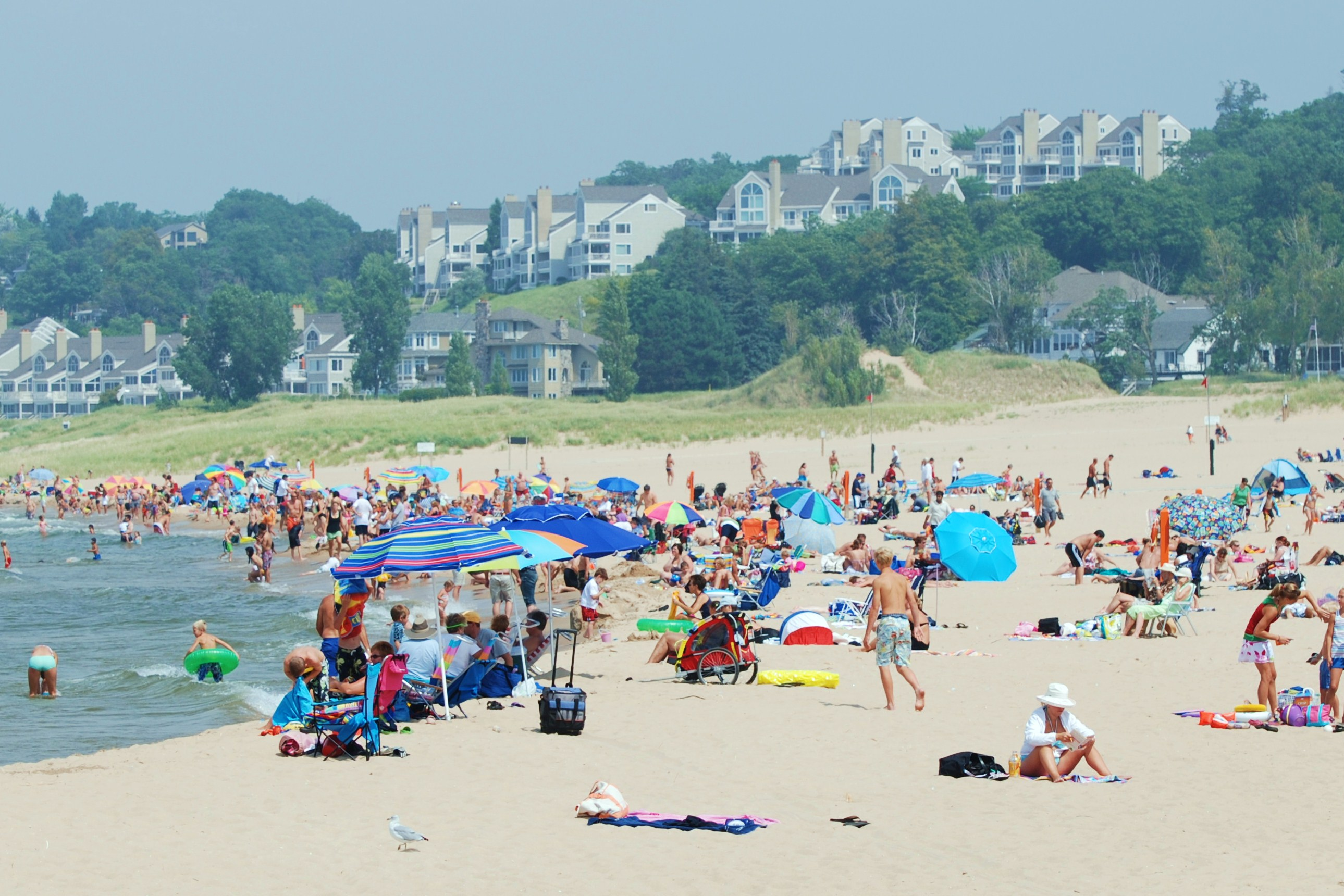
- Beach and visitors (2008)

- Location within Michigan Location within the United States
- Location: Park Township, Ottawa County, Michigan, United States
- Nearest city: Holland, Michigan
- Coordinates: 42°46′44″N 86°12′17″W
- Area: 142 acres (57 ha)
- Elevation: 617 feet (188 m)
- Established: 1926
- Administrator: Michigan Department of Natural Resources
- Designation: Michigan state park
- Website: Official website

Holland State Park is a public recreation area covering 142 acres (57 ha) in Park Township, Ottawa County, four miles (6 km) west of the city of Holland, Michigan. The state park consists of separate Lake Macatawa and Lake Michigan units on the northern side of the channel connecting Lake Macatawa with Lake Michigan. It is often the most visited state park in Michigan, receiving between 1.5 and 2 million visitors annually.

== Activities and amenities ==
In addition to swimming, boating, fishing, and camping, the park features dune areas, picnic areas, playgrounds, and views of Holland Harbor and the Holland Harbor Light, "Big Red". The Lake Macatawa unit features a campground, beach, and public boat launch. The Lake Michigan unit features a paved campground, pavilion, and broad sandy beach along Lake Michigan. The adjacent channel breakwall is a popular walk in the summer, though it is not intended for public use and can be treacherous during adverse weather.
