= Beechwood, Michigan =

- Census-designated place (CDP) & Unincorporated community
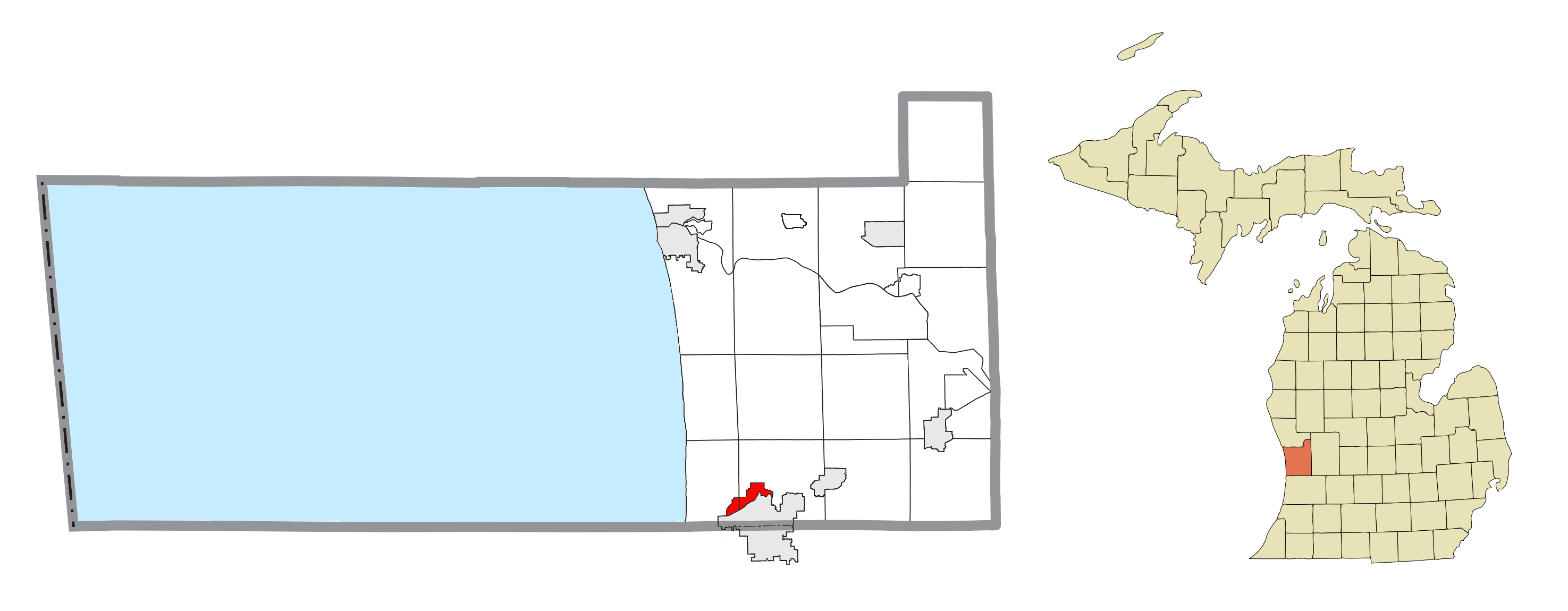
- Location within Ottawa County

- Location within the state of Michigan Location within the United States
- Coordinates: 42°47′49″N 86°07′33″W
- Country: United States
- State: Michigan
- County: Ottawa
- Townships: Holland and Park

Area
  - Total: 2.32 sq mi (6.01 km^{2})
  - Land: 1.81 sq mi (4.69 km^{2})
  - Water: 0.51 sq mi (1.32 km^{2})
- Elevation: 607 ft (185 m)

Population (2020)
  - Total: 3,121
  - Density: 1,724.31/sq mi (665.76/km^{2})
- Time zone: UTC-5 (Eastern (EST))
  - Summer (DST): UTC-4 (EDT)
- ZIP code(s): 49424 (Holland)
- Area code: 616
- FIPS code: 26-06880
- GNIS feature ID: 1867312

Beechwood is an unincorporated community in Ottawa County in the U.S. state of Michigan. It is a census-designated place (CDP) for statistical purposes, but is not an incorporated municipality. The population was 3,121 at the 2020 census.

The CDP is considered to be part of the Holland urban area. It is located on the north shore of Lake Macatawa mostly within Holland Charter Township, although a small portion lies within Park Township.

== Geography ==
According to the United States Census Bureau, the community has a total area of 2.7 square miles (7.0 km^{2}), of which 1.8 square miles (4.7 km^{2}) is land and 0.9 square miles (2.3 km^{2}) (32.22%) is water.

== Demographics ==
Historical population
Census	Pop.	Note	%±
2020	3,121		—
U.S. Decennial Census

=== 2020 census ===
As of the 2020 census, Beechwood had a population of 3,121. The median age was 38.4 years. 22.3% of residents were under the age of 18 and 15.5% of residents were 65 years of age or older. For every 100 females there were 104.9 males, and for every 100 females age 18 and over there were 101.7 males age 18 and over.

100.0% of residents lived in urban areas, while 0.0% lived in rural areas.

There were 1,199 households in Beechwood, of which 29.4% had children under the age of 18 living in them. Of all households, 49.6% were married-couple households, 19.1% were households with a male householder and no spouse or partner present, and 23.4% were households with a female householder and no spouse or partner present. About 24.8% of all households were made up of individuals and 11.2% had someone living alone who was 65 years of age or older.

There were 1,275 housing units, of which 6.0% were vacant. The homeowner vacancy rate was 0.9% and the rental vacancy rate was 2.0%.

Racial composition as of the 2020 census
Race	Number	Percent
White	2,155	69.0%
Black or African American	78	2.5%
American Indian and Alaska Native	44	1.4%
Asian	147	4.7%
Native Hawaiian and Other Pacific Islander	0	0.0%
Some other race	358	11.5%
Two or more races	339	10.9%
Hispanic or Latino (of any race)	794	25.4%

=== 2000 census ===
As of the 2000 census, there were 2,963 people, 1,107 households, and 770 families residing in the community. The population density was 1,616.3 inhabitants per square mile (624.1/km^{2}). There were 1,169 housing units at an average density of 637.7 per square mile (246.2/km^{2}). The racial makeup of the community was 86.84% White, 1.21% African American, 0.30% Native American, 4.25% Asian, 0.03% Pacific Islander, 5.50% from other races, and 1.86% from two or more races. Hispanic or Latino of any race were 13.47% of the population.

There were 1,107 households, out of which 36.3% had children under the age of 18 living with them, 57.1% were married couples living together, 8.3% had a female householder with no husband present, and 30.4% were non-families. 23.9% of all households were made up of individuals, and 6.9% had someone living alone who was 65 years of age or older. The average household size was 2.67 and the average family size was 3.21.

In the community, the population was spread out, with 29.0% under the age of 18, 8.5% from 18 to 24, 33.5% from 25 to 44, 19.3% from 45 to 64, and 9.7% who were 65 years of age or older. The median age was 33 years. For every 100 females, there were 104.2 males. For every 100 females age 18 and over, there were 102.7 males.

The median income for a household in the community was $46,676, and the median income for a family was $56,087. Males had a median income of $37,000 versus $30,541 for females. The per capita income for the community was $22,968. About 5.9% of families and 8.1% of the population were below the poverty line, including 15.2% of those under age 18 and 3.8% of those age 65 or over.

== Education ==
It is in the West Ottawa Public School District.
