= Green Highways Partnership =

The Green Highways Partnership (GHP) is a voluntary, public/private initiative that aims to encourage the building of green highways and to encourage environmental stewardship through integrated planning, regulatory flexibility, and market-based rewards.

== Goal ==
GHP originally formed to transform transportation infrastructure through environmental streamlining and stewardship, within the mid-Atlantic region, including New Jersey, New York and Massachusetts. By creating a precedent for cross-sector partnering and integrated planning to achieve this goal, GHP is laying the groundwork for nationwide transferability.

== History ==
In 2002, the Federal Highway Administration (FHWA) named environmental stewardship and streamlining one of three “vital few” goals (along with safety and congestion mitigation). After this, substantial FHWA investments resulted in a wave of environmentally-focused programs such as Context Sensitive Solutions, the Exemplary Ecosystem Initiative, and others. The FHWA consulted the United States Environmental Protection Agency’s Mid-Atlantic Region 3 and determined that the effort would require consolidation of the various programs and an interconnected, multidisciplinary organization. They determined that market-based incentives would be the most effective means to achieve their goals. After an executive planning charrette and culminating forum, followed by a retreat, the Green Highways Partnership began.

== See also ==
- Green building
- Green highway construction
