= Albertus van Raalte =

Dutch American clergyman

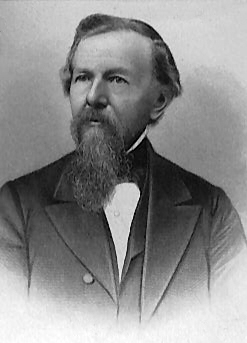
- Albertus van Raalte in 1847
- Born: Albertus Christiaan van Raalte; 17 October 1811; Wanneperveen, Netherlands
- Died: 27 July 1876 (aged 64); Holland, Michigan, U.S.
- Occupation: Reformed minister
- Spouse: Christina De Moen
- Children: 10, including Dirk Van Raalte

Albertus Christiaan van Raalte (17 October 1811 – 27 July 1876) was a Dutch Reformed clergyman who moved to the United States with a group of Dutch emigrants and founded the city of Holland, Michigan, in 1846. In 1851, he was involved in founding the school that would become Hope College.

He joined the Reformed Church in America, which had existed since 1628, and was the spiritual leader of the Protestant Reformed Dutch Americans in Michigan In 1857, van Raalte disputed a number of issues with another reformed minister, Roelof Smit, and led a secession from Smit's congregation.

== Early life and education ==
Van Raalte was initially attracted to medicine, but enrolled in the theological school at the University of Leiden to please his father, who was also a clergyman. After being spared by cholera, which ravaged the Netherlands, van Raalte was inspired to devote his life to preaching.

Following van Raalte's theological training in Leiden, he preached in Genemuiden, where he was banned from preaching in 1835 because he did not recognize the regulations of the Dutch Reformed Church. He was ordained in the Secession Church in 1836, following the split of the Dutch Reformed Church. Van Raalte preached in the province of Overijssel and elsewhere, and was arrested more than once.

== Emigration to America ==
In 1846, van Raalte moved to the United States along with a group of Dutch followers largely from Overijssel, and founded the city of Holland, Michigan. At the time, Dutch farmers were burdened by the European potato failure, high taxes, and a scarcity of land; many farmers' sons did not inherit sufficient land to make a living.

Initially, van Raalte considered immigrating to the Dutch East Indies or South Africa, but ultimately chose the United States for its freedom and space. He visited the Lower Peninsula of Michigan and was encouraged to settle by William Montague Ferry, a missionary who had founded the city of Grand Haven. Van Raalte found the area ideal for farming, and along with fellow minister Anthony Brummelkamp, he wrote and distributed a pamphlet for his followers in the Netherlands that described West Michigan. Between 1846 and 1848, several groups arrived in his new colony of Holland, Michigan including from Zeeland, the County of Bentheim, Groningen, and Friesland. The first years were difficult for the new colony, and many emigrants died from hardship and disease.

== Religious career ==
In the United States, van Raalte joined the Reformed Church in America, which had existed since 1628, and was a spiritual leader among Protestant Dutch Reformed immigrants. In 1857, van Raalte had disputes with another reformed minister, Roelof Smit, which lead to the secession of Smit's congregation.

In addition to settling Holland, Van Raalte later started a Dutch colony in Amelia Court House, Virginia.

== Personal life ==
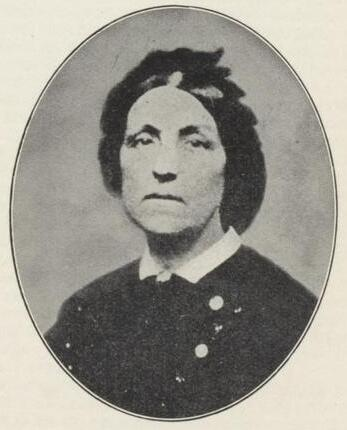
Christina Johanna de Moen

Van Raalte married Christina De Moen in 1836. He was the father of ten total children; seven of those ten children survived into adulthood: three boys and four girls. One of these children was future Union soldier and politician Dirk Van Raalte.

== Legacy ==
Van Raalte's personal papers are housed at the Heritage Hall Archives of Calvin University.
