= Green highway =

A green highway is a roadway constructed per a relatively new concept for roadway design that integrates transportation functionality and ecological sustainability. An environmental approach is used throughout the planning, design, and the construction. The result is a highway that will benefit transportation, the ecosystem, urban growth, public health and surrounding communities.

== Research ==
Green Highways Partnership (GHP) is an alliance of Federal Highway Administration (FHWA), U.S. Environmental Protection Agency (EPA), other Federal agencies, State transportation and environmental agencies, industry, trade associations, members of academia, and contractors to encourage environmentally friendly road building.

Another effort to create greener highways is a research program named Asphalt Research Consortium (ACR) created by collaboration of FHWA, private institutions, and several universities. The program studies potential ways to make asphalt more environmentally sustainable, which will result in improved traffic safety and reduced life-cycle cost.

A 2019 research project from the Cooperative Research Program of the Transportation Research Board determined the state-of-practice in highway construction sustainability and produced a guidebook for practitioners as an aid in communicating, implementing, and evaluating sustainable highway construction.

== Benefits ==
When built to standards of the concept, green highways have invaluable benefits to environment. Since they are built with permeable materials that provide superior watershed-driven stormwater management, leaching of metals and toxins into streams and rivers is prevented. Landfill usage is favorably reduced as construction involves recycled materials. In addition, by using cutting-edge technologies in design, critical habitats and ecosystems are protected from the encroachment of highway infrastructure.

== Characteristics ==
To develop a green highway, a project can follow guidelines provided below by GHP:

- Provide a net increase in environmental functions and values of a watershed.
- Exceed minimum standards set by environmental laws and regulations.
- Identify and protect historic and cultural landmarks.
- Map all resources in the area in order to avoid, identify, and protect critical resource areas.
- Use innovative, natural methods to reduce imperviousness, and cleanse all runoff within the project area.
- Maximize use of existing transportation infrastructure, providing multi-modal transportation opportunities, and promoting ride-sharing/public transportation.
- Use recycled materials to eliminate waste and reduce the energy required to build the highway.
- Link regional transportation plans with local land use partnerships.
- Control populations of invasive species, and promoting the growth of native species.
- Incorporate post project monitoring to ensure environmental results.
- Protect the hydrology of wetlands and streams channels through restoration of natural drainage paths.
- Result in a suite of targeted environmental outcomes based upon local environmental needs.
- Reduce disruptions to ecological processes by promoting wildlife corridors and passages in areas identified through wildlife conservation plans.
- Encourage smart growth by integrating and guiding future growth and capacity building with ecological constraints.

Other parameters associated with green highways and green roads include:

- Trees saplings planted near the roads includes varied species and may follow methods of polyculture. Saplings are selected considering various reasons such as conservation need, aesthetics, maintenance costs, spiritual and religious association, mythological reasons, heritage value, medicinal value, tolerance capacity, nativity to the region, association with other species, canopy spread, safety to the drivers, benefit to the community, benefit to the natural environment, etc.
- Creating micro-forests and urban forests near the highways and roads.
- Preference for planting tree saplings in multiple rows or lines, towards developing tree-zones or tree groves near the roads.
- Creation, maintenance and protection of water-bodies near the roads (ponds, streams, rivers, wells etc.).
- Passenger waiting areas being environmentally-friendly (made from biodegradable, recycled, recyclable, renewable resources).

== Technology ==
Green highway construction can incorporate several technical elements including, but not limited to:

- Bioretention Swales
- Porous Pavements
- Environmentally Friendly concrete
- Forest Buffer
- Restored and Stormwater Wetlands
- Stream Restoration
- Wildlife crossing
- Soil amendments
- Stormwater Management with Pervious Concrete Pavement

== Examples ==
U.S. Highway 301 Waldorf Transportation Improvements project is working towards becoming the nation’s first truly green highway by incorporating the principles of the Green Highways Partnership and green infrastructure in its earliest planning stages. The project encompasses an area from MD 5 and US 301 interchange in Prince George's County to the US 301 intersection with Washington Avenue and Turkey Hill Road in Charles County. It aims to improve the local traffic operation along US 301 while promoting and securing environmental stewardship.

Anacostia Watershed Protection: This pilot competition is designed to support the protection and restoration of urban water resources through a holistic watershed approach to water quality management. Funding will be directed to environmentally sound, watershed projects that stress a wide range of water quality improvement strategies and targets.

== See also ==
- Green building
- Green Highways Partnership
