= Roelof Smit (minister) =

Dutch-American minister (1815–1886)

Roelof Harms Smit
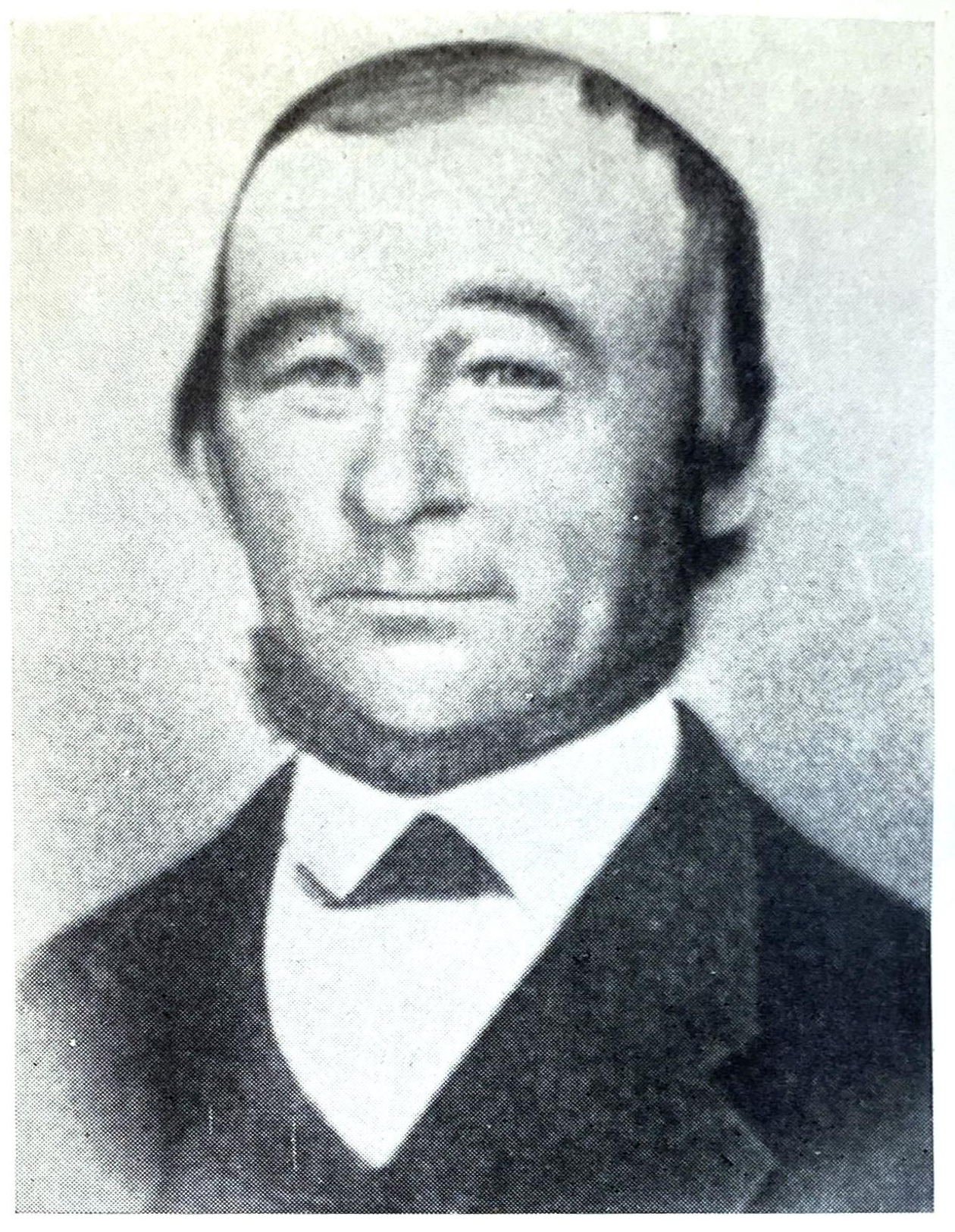
- Depitction of Roelof Smit from 1859

Personal life
- Born: July 22, 1815 Rouveen, Netherlands
- Died: May 27, 1886 (aged 70) Zeeland, Michigan

Religious life
- Religion: Christian

Roelof Harms Smit (1815-1886) was a Dutch-American minister. Smit ministered a congregation in Drenthe, Michigan in the mid-1800s, which led to a notable secession in the history of the Christian Reformed Church of North America.

== Biography ==
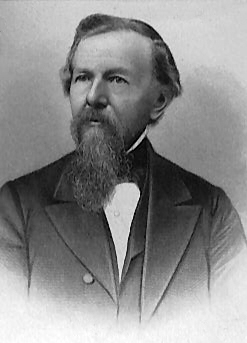
Albertus van Raalte was considered a theological opponent of Smit as they publicly disagreed with each other on a number of issues

Born in the Netherlands in 1815, Roelof Smit grew up in the small town of Rouveen, Overijssel. Roelof Smit attended seminary in Holland and was later recruited to pastor a congregation in the United States. Smit arrived in Drenthe, Michigan in 1851 and pastored a Reformed church until 1857 when his congregation seceded. Albertus van Raalte was considered a theological opponent of Smit as they publicly disagreed with each other on a number of issues. Michael Douma has written that "Van Raalte fought bitterly with Roelof Smit, a minister in Drenthe, Michigan, whose congregation voted to leave the Reformed Church for the United Presbyterians."

== Death ==
Smit died in 1886 at the age of 70. Although he fought and argued publicly about his theological differences with Albertus van Raalte and secession from the Christian Reformed Church, in his dying wishes he instructed the seceded members to rejoin the Christian Reformed Church. On his deathbed Smit expressed regret for having led his followers to secede from the Christian Reformed Church.

== Influence ==
In Family Quarrels in the Dutch Reformed Church of the 19th Century, Elton J. Bruins argues that Smit's influence in Drenthe, Michigan in 1853 contributed to the 1857 secession of 130 families from the Christian Reformed Church in North America.

Smit's work and beliefs spawned a number of adherents, such as Chicago minister Jan Schepers. In Dutch Chicago: A History of Hollanders in the Windy City, Robert R. Swierenga describes Jan Schepers, the first pastor of First Christian Reformed Church of Chicago as an intellectual and theological descendent of Roelof Smit, explaining that Jan Scheper's father Harm Schepers worked in union with Smit: "in 1853, together with pastor Roelof Smit, Harm had led [the Drenthe church] congregation to secede from the Classis of Holland and join the Associate Reformed or 'Scottish' Church, a conservative, psalm-singing body that in 1858 entered into a merger that began the United Presbyterian Church."

== Personal life ==
Roelof Smit married Grietje Boesenkool in 1847. While Roelof Smit immigrated from the Netherlands to the United States in 1851, the rest of his family remained in Holland. The offspring of his brother Hendrik immigrated to Canada following World War II and the Dutch famine of 1944–1945.

== See also ==
- Albertus van Raalte
- Christian Reformed Church in North America
- Dutch Reformed Church
