= Murder of Betsy Aardsma =

1969 American murder case

Betsy Aardsma
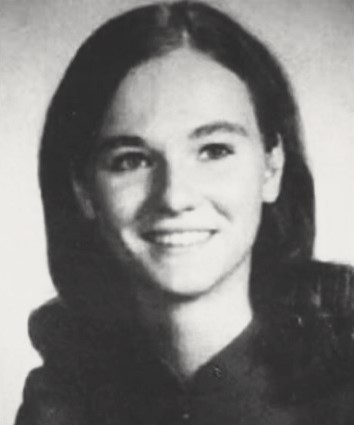
- Betsy Aardsma, spring 1969
- Born: Elizabeth Ruth Aardsma; July 11, 1947; Holland, Michigan, U.S.
- Died: November 28, 1969 (aged 22); University Park, Pennsylvania, U.S.
- Cause of death: Stab wound to the chest
- Resting place: Pilgrim Home Cemetery, Holland, Michigan U.S.
- Education: University of Michigan; Pennsylvania State University
- Occupation: Graduate student
- Known for: Victim of unsolved homicide

The murder of Betsy Aardsma is an American murder case dating from November 1969, in which a 22-year-old graduate student was murdered by a single stab wound inside the Pattee Library at the Pennsylvania State University (Penn State) in University Park, Pennsylvania.

Though Aardsma's murder remains officially unsolved, local investigative journalists and two independent authors have published testimony and reports which strongly indicate Penn State geology professor Richard Haefner may have been responsible for her death, which has been described by one author as Pennsylvania's most infamous unsolved murder.

The evidence indicating Haefner's guilt of Aardsma's murder is circumstantial. Haefner was never charged with her murder. He died in 2002.

== Early life ==
Elizabeth Ruth "Betsy" Aardsma was the second of four children. She was born in Holland, Michigan, to Esther and Richard Aardsma, and raised in a middle-class, religious and conservative household on West 37th Street. Aardsma's father was a sales tax auditor for the Michigan State Treasurer, while her mother was a housewife.

As a child, Aardsma displayed a flair for art and poetry. By adolescence, she had developed somewhat liberal ideals and displayed a concern for the underprivileged. Aardsma attended Holland High School and performed well academically, graduating with honors in 1965. (Note: The population of Holland, Michigan in the mid-1960s was approximately 25,000.)

== Further education ==
Shortly after graduating from high school, Aardsma enrolled in Hope College in the fall of 1965 with aspirations to become a physician. Her roommate, Linda DenBesten, later recollected Aardsma as an intelligent and fascinating individual who exhibited feminist traits.

In the fall of 1967, Aardsma enrolled at the University of Michigan, studying art and English and sharing an apartment with three other female students. By her senior year, she had begun dating a medical student named David Wright, who by all accounts was her first serious boyfriend. (Note: Prior to dating Wright, Aardsma had dated several other young men, although none of these relationships had lasted for any significant period of time.) She graduated from this institution with honors in the summer of 1969.

=== Pennsylvania State University ===
Upon graduation from the University of Michigan, Aardsma initially intended to join the Peace Corps and travel to Africa, although she opted to enroll at Pennsylvania State University (Penn State) when she discovered that Wright, her boyfriend, intended to study there and that he could not guarantee he would remain loyal to her if she traveled abroad for any significant length of time.

Aardsma enrolled at Penn State in early October 1969. She resided on campus in Atherton Hall, and shared her residence with a student named Sharon Brandt, who would later recall that Aardsma seldom pursued extracurricular activities and spent much of her free time either studying or—on weekends—traveling to Penn State Hershey to be in the company of Wright. (Note: Penn State Hershey is located almost 100 miles from Pennsylvania State University.)

By Thanksgiving, Aardsma is known to have exhibited symptoms of stress due to the fact she had fallen behind on an English assignment. She spent the day prior to Thanksgiving in the company of her boyfriend, his roommates and their girlfriends before returning to her dormitory the following day, with intentions to meet her professors for advice on a research paper she needed to complete for her assignment. Wright drove Aardsma to a nearby bus stop in Harrisburg on the afternoon of November 27.

At the time of her death, Aardsma had been in a relationship with Wright for approximately one year, and the two had discussed plans to become engaged by Christmas. She had been a student at Penn State for just eight weeks when she was murdered.

== November 28, 1969 ==
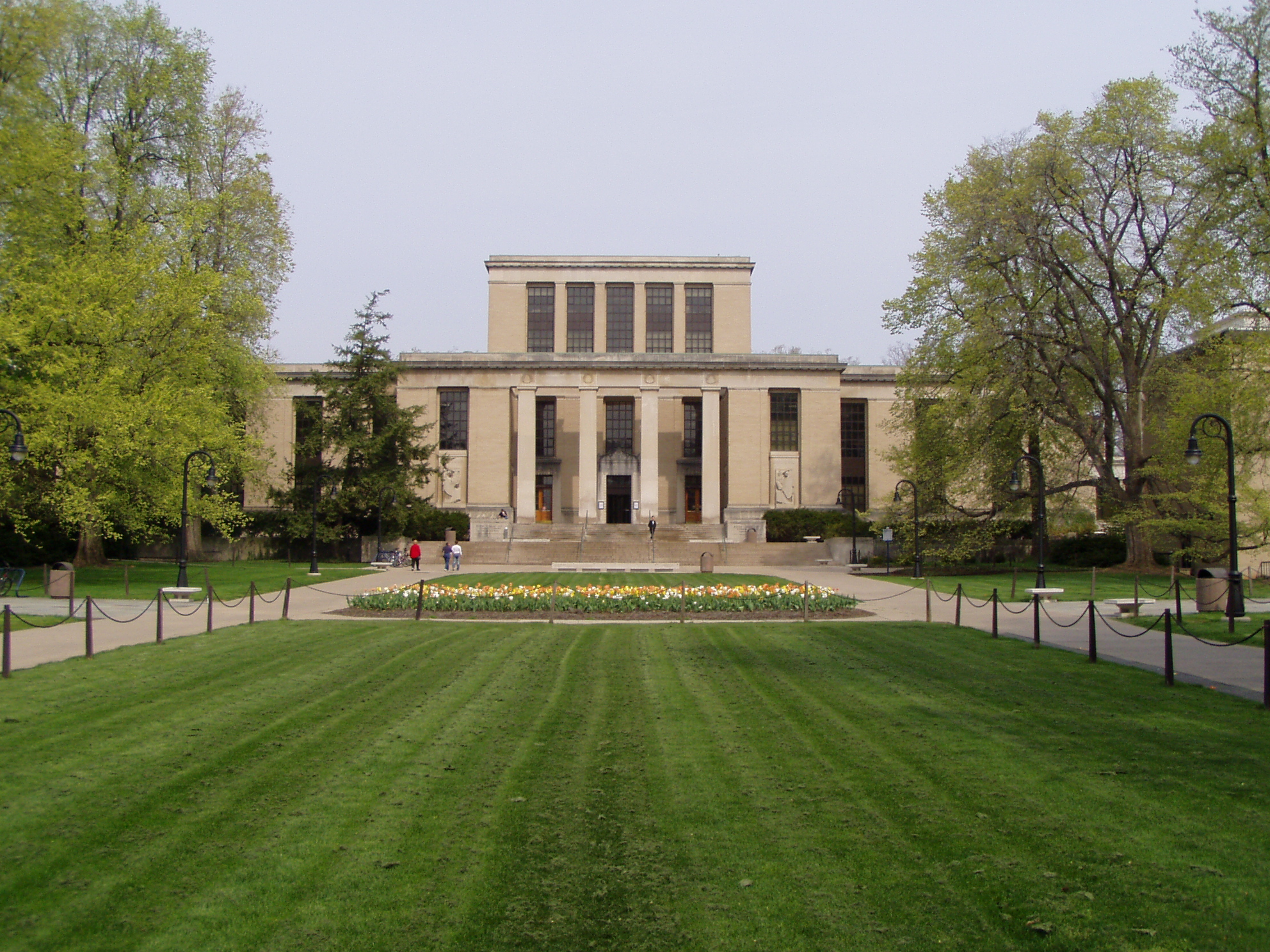
The Pattee Library

On the afternoon of November 28, 1969, Aardsma and Brandt left their residence to visit Penn State's Pattee Library to obtain research material for her English paper. En route, the two parted company, having formed plans to reconvene later that afternoon to watch either Easy Rider or Take the Money and Run at a movie theater that evening. At approximately 4 p.m., Aardsma spoke with one of her professors, Nicholas Joukovsky, to whom she stated her intentions to visit the Stack Building. (Note: The Stack Building is known colloquially among the student population of Pennsylvania State University as "the Stacks".) Shortly thereafter, she encountered two friends, Linda Marsa and Robert Steinberg, with whom she briefly conversed before entering the library. She then placed her purse, jacket, and a book inside a carrel assigned to her before walking toward a card catalog. Having found the reference she sought, Aardsma walked down a flight of stairs into the Level 2 core stacks at approximately 4:30 p.m.

The final potential sightings of Aardsma in the Level 2 core stacks occurred minutes after 4:30 p.m., when an assistant supervisor named Dean Brungart observed a girl in a red dress standing alone in an aisle, with two young men talking quietly among themselves in a nearby aisle closer to the west end of the core. Approximately ten minutes later, another witness, Richard Allen, overheard a conversation between a male and a female in the general direction of where Aardsma stood as he operated a photocopier. Although Allen could not hear what the two spoke, he informed police nothing sounded untoward. Moments later, Allen heard a metallic crashing noise before a young man whom he described as "looking like a student" ran "barrelling" past him. (Note: Some contemporary newspaper accounts describe this commotion as being a high-pitched female scream, followed by a crashing noise and the sound of books falling. However, eyewitness reports do not contain accounts of hearing a woman scream before the metallic crashing sound.)

=== Murder ===
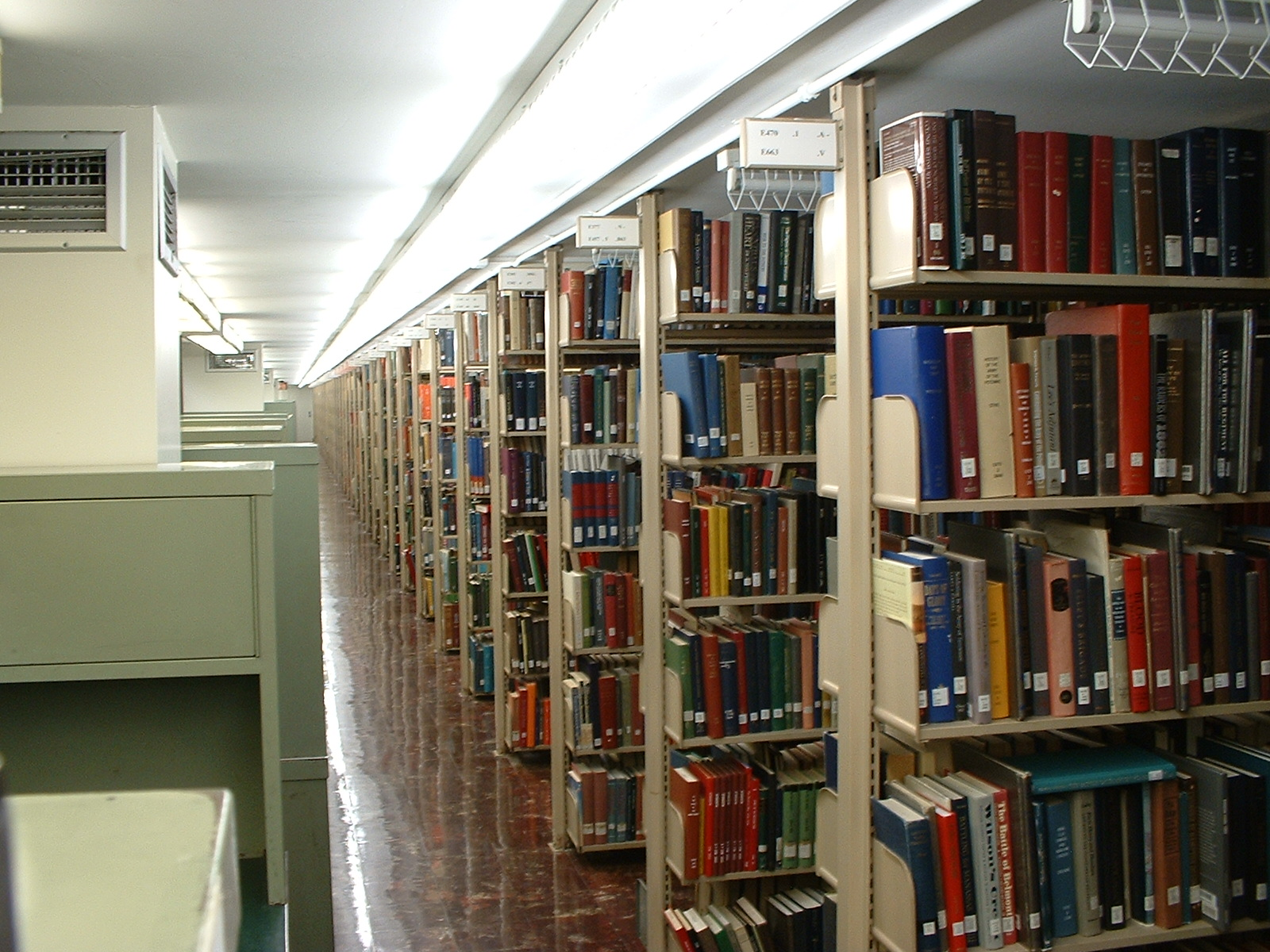
The Stacks, seen here in 2006

At some point between 4:45 and 4:55 p.m., Aardsma was stabbed a single time through the left breast with a knife while standing between rows 50 and 51 in the dimly lit Stack Building of the Pattee Library. This wound severed her pulmonary artery and pierced the right ventricle of her heart. Following the stabbing, Aardsma slumped to the ground close to the end of the aisle, pulling several books off adjacent shelves as she fell onto her back. Two students—Joao Uafinda and Marilee Erdley—then observed a man running from the direction of the commotion, concealing his right hand, exclaiming, "That girl needs help!" Erdley described this man as being dressed in khaki washable slacks, a tie, and a sports jacket. He had well-kept brown hair, was approximately 6 ft in height, about 185 lbs, and may have been wearing glasses. This individual led Uafinda and Erdley into the Core, where he pointed toward the prone body of Aardsma lying between scattered books and metal shelves which had also been knocked loose. As Erdley began to check for signs of a pulse, Uafinda observed this individual leaving the library; he discreetly followed the man upstairs, where the individual ran out of the library. Uafinda attempted to chase this man but was outpaced. This individual was last seen running in the direction of the Recreation Hall.

Subsequent police appeals for the man or men who spoke these words to Uafinda and Erdley before fleeing from the library to come forward were unsuccessful, and the individual has never been identified.

=== Medical efforts ===
As Uafinda attempted to pursue the individual fleeing the library, Erdley attempted to render first aid to Aardsma, including mouth-to-mouth resuscitation, and was soon joined by a group of bystanders, including a librarian. (Note: One individual in this crown was a tanned, mustached man in a brown overcoat whom a student named Shirley Brooks had bumped into at approximately 4:45 p.m. as he had been exiting the Level 2 Core stacks.) A call was placed to the campus hospital, the Ritenour Health Center, at 5:01 p.m., with responders initially informed a "girl had fainted" in the Pattee Library. Two student paramedics were dispatched to the scene, arriving minutes later. Aardsma was quickly placed on a gurney and removed from the library via a service elevator, to be taken to the Health Center, as the paramedics continued to perform cardiopulmonary resuscitation (CPR) upon her. The summoned ambulance transported Aardsma to the Health Center.

Although Aardsma was wearing a white turtleneck sweater at the time she was stabbed, the wound produced only a small amount of visible blood. However, Aardsma was also wearing a red sleeveless dress over this sweater at the time of her murder, and the clothing she wore had been of thick material in the November climate, thus meaning the single knife tear within her clothing was not immediately obvious. She had also urinated where she fell. As result of these facts, the non-medical individuals who discovered her body—plus the student first responders summoned to the scene in response to reports of a female student having "fainted" in the library—initially believed that she had indeed either fainted, experienced a seizure, or some other non-critical medical ailment.

Very shortly after Aardsma was transported to the Health Center, a more senior medical individual observed blood seeping through her clothing as the two student paramedics continued to perform CPR and immediately ordered the two to stop before locating the single stab wound. Aardsma was pronounced dead by a physician at 5:50 p.m.

== Autopsy ==
Aardsma's autopsy was conducted by Dr. Thomas Magnani at Bellefonte Hospital in Bellefonte at 11 p.m. on November 28, concluding at 4 a.m. the following morning. Magnani concluded Aardsma had been killed by a single stab wound which had penetrated her breastbone, piercing her heart and severing her pulmonary artery, causing extensive hemorrhaging into her chest cavity. Death had occurred within five minutes, and Aardsma would have been unable to scream for help as she essentially drowned in her own blood. Furthermore, she had not been subjected to any form of sexual assault.

Signs of petechial hemorrhaging were also discovered on Aardsma's chest, and minor signs of bruising and abrasions noted around one ear had likely been caused as she fell to the ground. Magnani further opined his belief Aardsma's murderer had intentionally aimed for her heart when he had stabbed her while facing her, and that her assailant was a right-handed individual.

== Investigation ==
Pennsylvania State Police assigned approximately thirty-five troopers to investigate Aardsma's murder. These troopers were assigned usage of the Boucke Building as a temporary command center as they conducted inquiries, and hundreds of students were interviewed in the weeks following her death. (Note: An article published in 1970 stated "between 2,500 and 3,000" interviews with staff and students at Penn State had been conducted, although no hard evidence had been obtained.) The entire campus was unsuccessfully searched in an effort to locate the murder weapon, (Note: A knife would be found beneath some bushes outside the university's Recreation Hall in the spring of 1970. The size and shape of this weapon was a precise match for the blade which had inflicted Aardsma's fatal wound. However, the passage of time had eroded any physical evidence upon the weapon.) and a $25,000 (the equivalent of approximately $220,800 as of 2026) reward was offered for information leading to the arrest of Aardsma's killer. Investigators would soon discover up to 400 individuals would typically enter or exit the Pattee Library between 4:30 and 5:00 p.m. on a Friday, although on the date in question, only about 90 had done so. None of those interviewed were considered viable suspects.

Two composite sketches of the individual Uafinda and Erdley had seen running from the direction of Aardsma's stabbing were created—one with the assistance of Uafinda and a library desk clerk; one with Erdley—although only Erdley's identikit image was released to the media.

Before police had even been notified of Aardsma's death, the crime scene was compromised as library staff—believing Aardsma had fainted or fallen—had ordered janitors to clean the urine from the tile flooring of the aisle, fix the shelving and restack the fallen books. As such, any physical evidence potentially left by the murderer at the scene was destroyed or compromised. However, the first trooper to visit the crime scene, Mike Simmers, ordered the area secured. A series of small, fresh blood droplets matching Aardsma's blood type were recovered from the staircase leading into the Level 3 core stacks, indicating her murderer had left the library via this route.

"Personally, I think it was one of her fellow students who knew her. This was up close and personal ... I just feel it."

— Trooper Mike Simmers, theorizing as to the identity of Aardsma's murderer. December 2008.

Several factors in the circumstances surrounding Aardsma's death led police to believe she had likely known her murderer, as she had evidently been approached from the front by her assailant within a row too narrow for one individual to pass another unless one of the two turned sideways, and had made no attempt to scream or flee. (Note: Police could not completely discount the possibility Aardsma was attacked from behind, as her hands bore no defensive wounds.) Exhaustive research and questioning also led investigators to discount any possibility she had been stalked, and she had not been expected to be at Penn State that day, but with Wright, who was quickly eliminated from the inquiry. Moreover, although Aardsma had recently expressed incipient concerns about potentially becoming a "physician's wife" and a mother while still young to one acquaintance, none of the entries in her diary, or the letters she regularly wrote to Wright, indicated she had felt reluctant about her relationship prospects, interested in another suitor, or had otherwise felt intimidated and/or uncomfortable during the eight weeks she had been enrolled at Penn State.

Other theories investigated have included the possibility Aardsma may have stumbled upon a homosexual encounter, an exhibitionist, or a man engaging in masturbatory fantasies, and had been murdered to ensure her silence. This theory was given particular credence by investigator Michael Mutch, who speculated Aardsma had observed two men engaged in sexual behavior, had recognized one or both men, and had been murdered to prevent her divulging to others what she had seen. (Note: Homophobia was commonplace in the late 1960s, with public intimidation, suppression, and negative stereotyping considered by many to be acceptable. Any individual accused or convicted of committing homosexual acts as a student at Penn State could potentially face expulsion, public ridicule, and the potential destruction of his planned future career.)

A few aisles from where Aardsma had been murdered, in a section of the Core used to store desks and spare shelving, investigators observed a desk with a seat pulled backwards. Atop this desk was a half-empty can of soda and a small stack of heterosexual and homosexual pornographic magazines—some of which dated as recently as October and November 1969. (Note: Investigators also discovered a recent carving upon a desktop close to where Aardsma had been murdered. Inscribed in capital letters, this engraving read: 'HERE SAT DEATH IN THE GUISE OF A MAN —RSK'.) Furthermore, more than two dozen pornographic magazines were found concealed between books in the aisle where she had been murdered, and ample traces of semen were discovered in multiple locations on the floor, shelves and walls, with one investigator later commenting traces of semen were practically "everywhere". These discoveries led investigators to conclude secluded areas of the stacks were used to conduct illicit sexual encounters. Although partial fingerprints were obtained from this can of soda, the prints did not match any within police databases. All fingerprints upon and within the magazines were smudged and unusable.

Other theories investigators considered were the possibility Aardsma may have been murdered by a spurned suitor, had witnessed a drug deal and had been murdered to ensure her silence, or had been murdered due to an unsettled drug debt. However, although Aardsma did smoke cigarettes, and very occasionally drank alcohol, acquaintances were adamant she was not a user of drugs.

Despite several leads of inquiry being pursued and hundreds of potential witnesses interviewed over the span of several years, no individual was arrested for her murder.

=== Cold case ===
Despite the efforts of Pennsylvania State Police and the president of the university, Eric Walker (who had conducted his own private investigation into Aardsma's murder), the case gradually became cold and the number of investigators assigned to the case decreased as potential leads to pursue became increasingly scarce. The murder remains unsolved. Records pertaining to the case remain sealed under the state's Open Records Act. However, Pennsylvania State Police are still actively seeking information on the case.

== Suspects ==
=== William Spencer ===
William Spencer was a 40-year-old sculptor who had relocated to Pennsylvania from Boston with his second wife shortly before Aardsma's murder. He had previously co-founded the Caffè Lena with his first wife in Saratoga Springs, New York, in May 1960, and had recently relocated to Pennsylvania with his second wife, obtaining employment teaching sculpture at a local college as his wife studied for her Ph.D. Spencer was first reported to police as a potential suspect in Aardsma's murder after allegedly confessing to having "killed that girl in the library" at a Christmas 1969 gathering of faculty members. These claims culminated in his being formally questioned by investigators in early 1970.

According to Spencer, he and Aardsma had been acquainted, and she agreed to pose nude for his sculpting classes to earn extra money. He had been in the Level 2 core stacks at the time of her murder, and had seen her murderer, whom he insisted had been wearing an overcoat. He offered to construct a bust of the individual he had seen for investigators, which he later provided to the task force assembled to apprehend her murderer.

Police quickly dismissed Spencer's claims, as he and his wife had relocated to Pennsylvania just weeks prior to Aardsma's murder, thus offering little time for the two to become acquainted. His claims she had been a nude model were never corroborated, and rapidly dismissed by investigators and acquaintances alike, as Aardsma was known to be a prudish young woman. Furthermore, all nude models at Spencer's classes are known to have traveled to the university from Philadelphia.

=== Larry Maurer ===
One student who initially aroused investigators' suspicions was a classmate of Aardsma's named Larry Maurer. Maurer is known to have become acquainted with Aardsma in the weeks before her death, on one occasion taking her for a coffee. No ill-feeling is known to have existed between the two, and Maurer is known to have been cleared as a potential suspect in her murder, although it is unknown whether he actually passed or failed a polygraph test. However, Maurer was a blond individual, of average height, who did not wear glasses, making his physical appearance markedly different from that of the individual seen by three eyewitnesses—one of whom had been a classmate of his—running away from the Level 2 core stacks immediately after Aardsma's murder.

=== Richard Haefner ===
Author Derek Sherwood and investigative journalist David DeKok have each published books focusing upon Aardsma's murder. Both authors strongly believe Penn State professor Richard Charles Haefner–then a 25-year-old geology student at the university–was responsible for her death, and not Maurer or Spencer.

A well-respected but socially awkward individual, Haefner is known to have taken extreme measures to obtain platonic relationships with women to conceal his homosexuality. On one occasion in 1968, he is known to have traveled from Pennsylvania to Massachusetts to inform a girl he barely knew he loved her. He had arrived unannounced at her apartment to inform her of this fact, only to be surprised when she slammed the door in his face. (Note: This student later discovered Haefner had extensively inquired around her campus to discover where she lived.) Haefner resided across the courtyard from Aardsma at Atherton Hall at the time of her death and was widely known for engaging in erratic behavior, including periodic bouts of explosive anger, and the suspected theft of several specimens from the university's rock and mineral collection. He was known to frequently dress in khaki trousers and a sports coat, and to keep his brown hair short and tidy. His friendship with Aardsma had been terminated by the victim shortly before her death.

Haefner's name had first been mentioned to investigators days after Aardsma's murder when Brandt, her roommate, had suggested to police that they interview him. According to Brandt, Haefner had visited their apartment on more than one occasion in the weeks prior to the murder. (Note: Although investigators found no evidence to confirm Aardsma had been stalked during the eight weeks she studied at Penn State, years after her death, a campus security officer would recollect to Sherwood that days prior to Aardsma's murder, he had observed her typing alone in the library one evening as he performed his security rounds. This individual had asked Aardsma if she would like him to safely escort her to her dormitory, to which she replied: "No. The guy (who lives) upstairs isn't around, so I'll be fine.")

Haefner was questioned by investigators in early December 1969. He freely admitted having become acquainted with Aardsma in late October, and to have occasionally socialized with her, although within approximately one week she had terminated their budding friendship, stating she wished to remain committed to Wright. According to Haefner, he had been eating an evening meal at a student union building on the evening of November 28, when he had first heard circulating rumors of a student having been murdered at the Pattee Library. Furthermore, he had subsequently felt physically ill upon learning his "former girlfriend" had been the murdered student. Haefner further claimed to have never set foot in the library, as he invariably obtained research material from the Deike Building, where literature related to geology was stored. The identikit image created by Uafinda and a desk clerk never circulated to the media bears a striking resemblance to Haefner. In addition, Haefner's studying schedule shows he spent the two years following Aardsma's murder studying almost exclusively off campus.

In August 1975, two young boys who worked in Haefner's family rock shop would separately accuse him of having molested them. Although his subsequent trial resulted in a hung jury, (Note: Eleven of the twelve jurors at Haefner's trial were convinced of his guilt; one juror remained unconvinced of his guilt.) these accusations resulted in his filing a number of subsequent vindictive lawsuits. Haefner successfully ensured the expungement of the records pertaining to his arrest and trial in 1981. Several years after Aardsma's murder, an acquaintance of Haefner's named Lauren Wright (no relation to David Wright) would report that shortly after 6 p.m. on the date of Aardsma's murder, Haefner had arrived at his household in a state of exhausted panic, blurting: "Have you heard? A girl I dated was murdered in the library!" Having conversed with the Wrights for a short period of time, Haefner left their household. This account contradicts Haefner's official accounts of his movements which he provided to investigators.

Lauren Wright failed to inform investigators of this conversation until 1976, following an argument with Haefner, who by the 1970s had begun to focus his interests upon volcanology. He remained a close acquaintance of Haefner's until the latter died alone in a hospital bathroom in March 2002. His cause of death was a tear in his aorta which bled into his lungs—a similar manner of death endured by Aardsma.

In 2009, a nephew of Haefner's contacted Sherwood to divulge that on one occasion in approximately 1975, he had overheard a heated conversation between Haefner and his mother, Ere, who had been aware of several accusations of pederasty levelled against her son dating back to 1967. According to this individual, the conversation had occurred shortly after Haefner's 1975 arrest, and his mother had expressed her concerns as to whether police suspected him of having "killed that girl" at Penn State. She had also chided him for coming to the attention of the police after "all [her] efforts" to protect him on the previous occasion. The overall context of this conversation indicated to Haefner's nephew that he had confessed to Aardsma's murder to his mother, who had ended the scolding of her son with the sentence: "You killed that girl, and now you're killing me!"

== Aftermath ==
Betsy Aardsma was laid to rest on December 3, 1969, following a service held at the Trinity Reformed Church in her hometown of Holland, Michigan. Her casket remained open throughout the ceremony prior to her interment, with the Reverend Gordon Van Oostenburg reciting a poem Aardsma had written in 1965 titled "Why Do I Live?" during the service. She was buried in the Aardsma family plot within Pilgrim Home Cemetery, with a single rose from David Wright placed in her hands. The final letter Aardsma wrote to Wright had arrived at his address the day after her murder.

Aardsma's murder ultimately became a major factor in the creation of a university police force at Penn State. The years prior to her death had seen an increase in violent crime, sexual assaults, and raucous student protests at the university, which had only a campus patrol to provide immediate law and order. Aardsma's death epitomized the need for increased public safety measures on the university campus, and a university police force was established in the early 1970s.

== See also ==
- Cold case
- Crime in Pennsylvania
- List of unsolved murders (1900–1979)

== Cited works and further reading ==
- Bobonich, Chris; Bobonich, Harry (2013). Bloody Ivy: Thirteen Unsolved Campus Murders. Bloomington, Indiana: Author House Publishing. ISBN 978-1-481-74018-0.
- Douglas, John; Olshaker, Mark (2012). The Cases That Haunt Us. New York: Scribner. ISBN 978-0-743-21239-7.
- Dunning, John (1987). Mindless Murders. London: Mulberry Editions. ISBN 978-1-873-12333-1.
- Dekok, David (2014). Murder in the Stacks: Penn State, Betsy Aardsma and the Killer Who Got Away. Connecticut: Globe Peqot. ISBN 978-1-493-01389-0.
- Katz, Hélèna (2010). Cold Cases: Famous Unsolved Mysteries, Crimes, and Disappearances in America. Santa Barbara: Greenwood Publishing Group. ISBN 978-0-313-37692-4.
- Newton, Michael (2004), The Encyclopedia of Unsolved Crimes, Checkmark Books, ISBN 0-816-04980-7
- Sherwood, Derek (2011). Who Killed Betsy?: Uncovering Penn State University's Most Notorious Unsolved Crime. New York: Pine Grove Press. ISBN 978-0-615-49811-9.
- Shkrum, Michael J.; Ramsay, David A. (2007). Forensic Pathology of Trauma. New Jersey: Humana Press. ISBN 978-1-588-29458-6.
- Webb, William (2020) [2014]. Getting Away With Murder: 15 Chilling Cold Cases That Will Make You Think Twice About Going Outside. California: Golgotha Press. ISBN 978-1-499-11370-9.
