= Holland Charter Township, Michigan =

Holland Township, Michigan
- Charter township
- Holland Charter Township
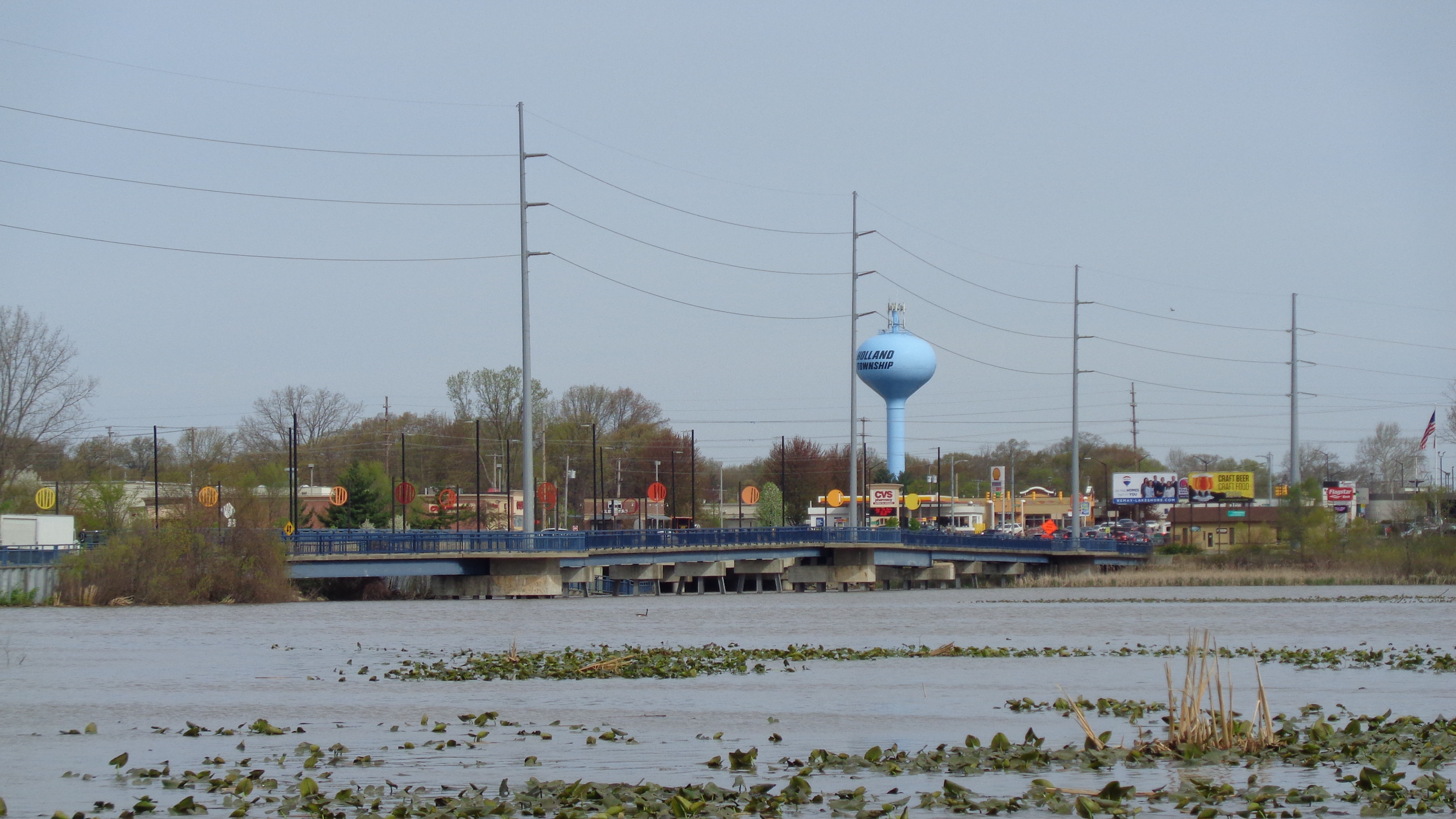
- View from across the Macatawa River

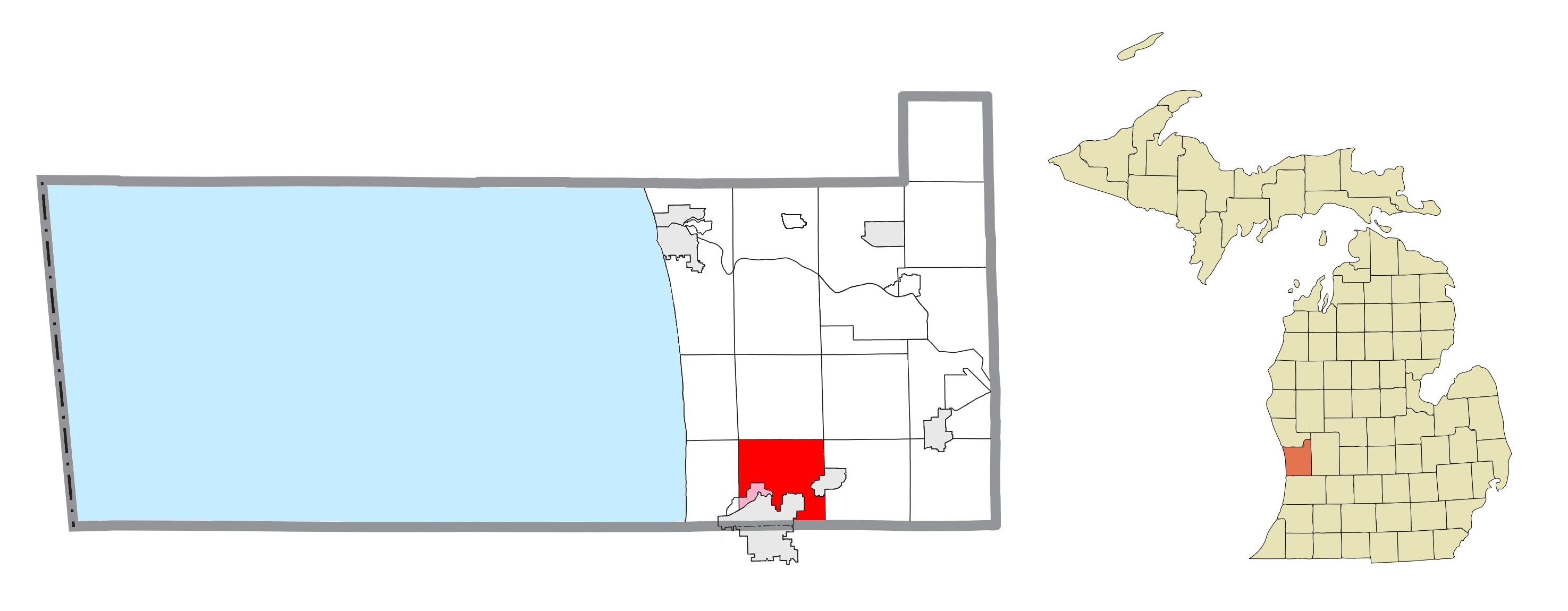
- Location within Ottawa County (red) and a portion of the administered CDP of Beechwood (pink)

- Location within the state of Michigan Location within the United States
- Coordinates: 42°48′48″N 86°05′16″W
- Country: United States
- State: Michigan
- County: Ottawa

Government
  - Supervisor: Terry Nienhuis
  - Clerk: Michael Dalman

Area
  - Total: 27.48 sq mi (71.17 km^{2})
  - Land: 27.03 sq mi (70.01 km^{2})
  - Water: 0.45 sq mi (1.17 km^{2})
- Elevation: 1,339 ft (408 m)

Population (2020)
  - Total: 38,276
  - Density: 1,416.1/sq mi (546.8/km^{2})
- Time zone: UTC-5 (Eastern (EST))
  - Summer (DST): UTC-4 (EDT)
- ZIP code(s): 49423 (Holland); 49424 (Beechwood); 49464 (Zeeland)
- Area code: 616
- FIPS code: 26-38620
- GNIS feature ID: 1626477
- Website: Official website

Holland Charter Township is a charter township of Ottawa County in the U.S. state of Michigan. As of the 2020 census, the population was 38,276.

The City of Holland is adjacent to the south and is administratively autonomous.

== Geography ==
According to the United States Census Bureau, the township has a total area of 27.5 square miles (71 km^{2}), of which 27.2 square miles (70 km^{2}) is land and 0.3 square miles (0.78 km^{2}) (1.02%) is water.

== Communities ==
Noordeloos is an unincorporated community located in the township. Beechwood is a census-designated place located mostly within the township, with a small portion lying in adjacent Park Township.

== Demographics ==
As of the 2020 United States census, there were 38,276 people living in the township. 59.6% were non-Hispanic White, 2.9% Black or African American, 7.1% Asian, 1.3% Native American, and 10.5% of two or more races. 27.8% were Hispanic or Latino.

== History ==
The former village of Cedar Swamp, located in sections 27 and 28 of Holland Township, was platted and recorded in 1848 by Albertus van Raalte, who also founded Holland, Michigan. By 1853 the population of the township was 1,418. Initially, Holland Township included present-day Park Township and Zeeland Township, with Zeeland Township breaking off in 1851.

In a book called The Shortest History of Migration, the economist Ian Goldin explains the concept of chain migration or network migration by noting that 90% of Dutch migrants from South Holland to the United States settled in three American towns, one of which was Noordeloos.
