= Dutch Americans in Michigan =

Map showing the largest ancestry group in each county (2008)

Dutch Michiganders are residents of the state of Michigan who are of Dutch ancestry. In the 1840s, Reformed (Calvinist) immigrants desiring more religious freedom immigrated. West Michigan in particular has become associated with Dutch American culture and the influence of the Reformed Church in America and Christian Reformed Church in North America (both offshoots of the Dutch Reformed Church), centering on the cities of Holland and (to a lesser extent) Grand Rapids. Conservative denominations of the Reformed tradition include the Netherlands Reformed Congregations and Heritage Reformed Congregations. Dutch is still spoken by the elderly and their children in Western Michigan. As of 2010, 5.1% of Michiganders are of Dutch descent.

== See also ==
- De Zwaan (windmill)
- Gazette van Detroit
- Holland, Michigan
- Holland Museum
- Tulip Time Festival
