= Lake Macatawa =

Lake in the state of Michigan, United States

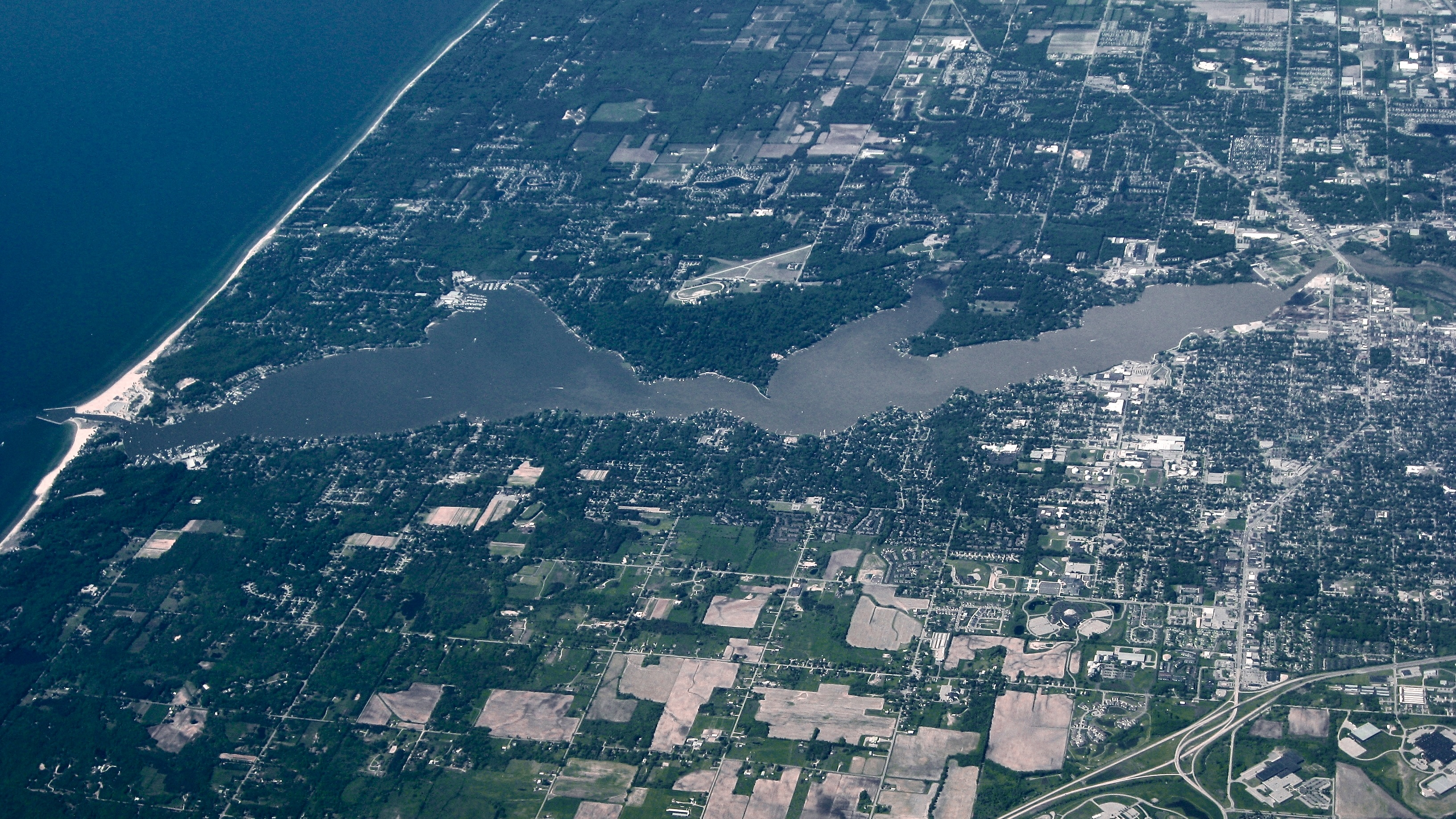
- Lake Macatawa in 2009

- Location within Michigan Location within the United States
- Location: Ottawa County, Michigan
- Coordinates: 42°46′44″N 86°10′47″W
- Type: Lake
- Primary inflows: Macatawa River
- Primary outflows: Lake Michigan
- Basin countries: United States
- Max. length: 6 miles (9.7 km)
- Max. width: 1.2 miles (1.9 km)
- Surface area: 2.83 mi^{2} (7.3 km^{2})
- Average depth: 10 ft (3.0 m)
- Max. depth: 34 ft (10 m)
- Surface elevation: 581 ft (177 m)
- Islands: None
- Settlements: Holland, Michigan

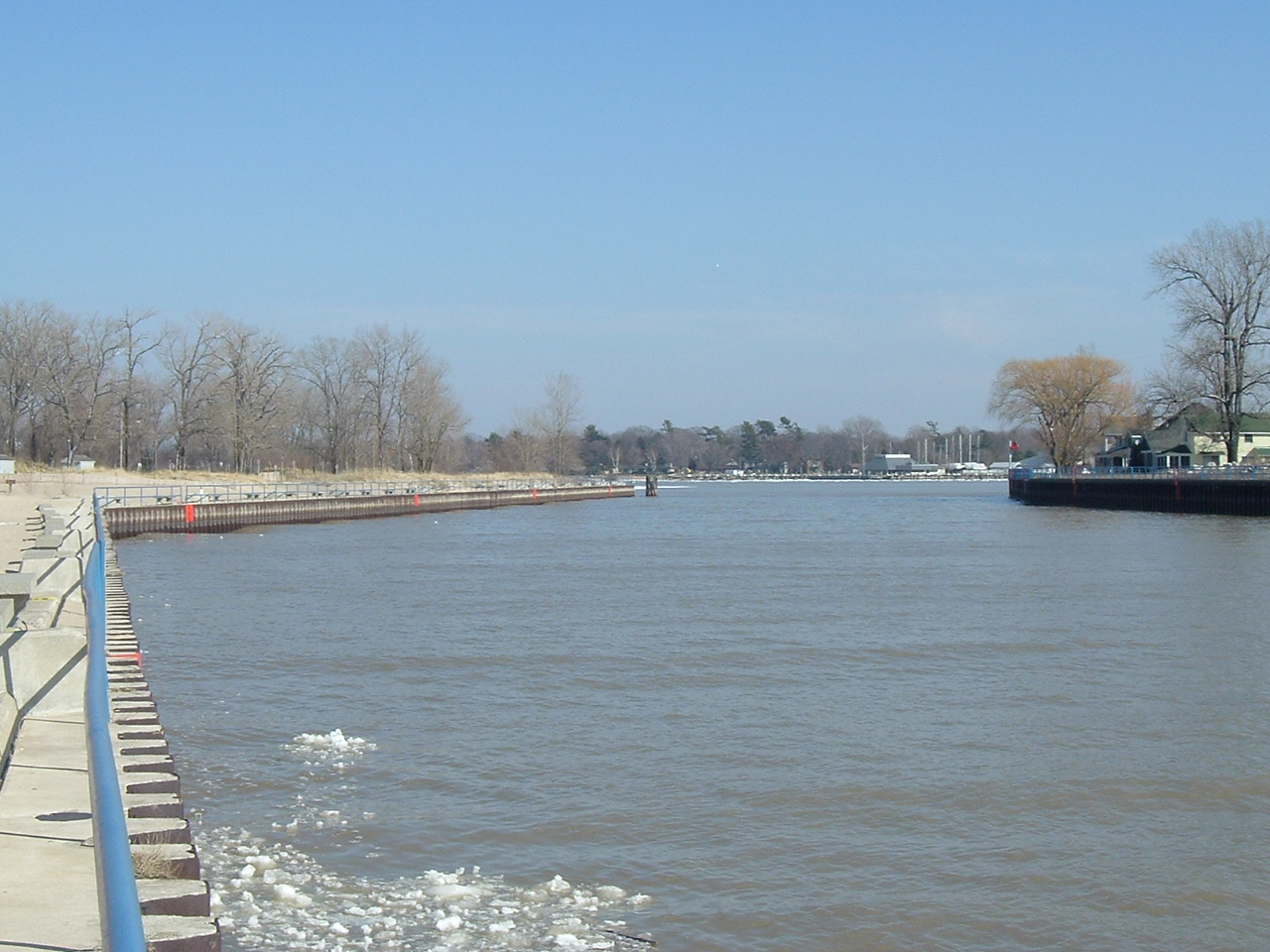
The channel connecting Lake Macatawa to Lake Michigan, facing Lake Macatawa.

Lake Macatawa (/ˌmækəˈtɑːwə/ mac-ə-TAH-wə), historically known as Black Lake, is a lake in Ottawa County in the U.S. state of Michigan.

== Geography ==
The lake is about 6 miles (9.7 km) long with a maximum width of 1.2 miles (1.9 km) and a surface area of 1,700 acres (2.7 mi^{2}; 6.9 km^{2}). The average depth of the lake is variable but generally less than 10 feet (3 m), excluding a navigation channel of fixed depth that crosses the lake to allow deep draft ships to access the dock at the City of Holland. The lake occupies portions of Park Township, Holland Township, and the City of Holland.

The lake contains two bays of significant size: Big Bay, and the smaller Pine Creek Bay to the east. The lake is the drowned river mouth of the Macatawa River (formerly known as the Black River), which feeds into the lake's eastern end in the City of Holland. Other tributaries include Pine Creek, which feeds into Pine Creek Bay, and Winstrom Creek, which feeds into Big Bay. The lake discharges into Lake Michigan at the U.S. Army Corps of Engineers channel near Holland State Park. The lake and its watershed encompass 114,560 acres (464 km^{2}) of Ottawa and Allegan counties.

== Industry ==
The eastern end of the lake is marked by industrial development within the City of Holland, and includes a decommissioned coal-fired power plant, scrap metal recycling facility, environmental research facility owned by Michigan State University, aggregate mineral loading dock, and a pickle production facility owned by the H.J. Heinz company. The remainder of the lakeshore is marked by high-income residential development, with the notable exception of Holland State Park which borders the northern shoreline of the western end of the lake, Howard B. Dunton park on the north shore of the eastern end, and Kollen Park near the Heinz factory, which connects to a boardwalk installed along the shoreline occupied by the facility.

== History ==
On Saturday, June 8, 1935 Lake Macatawa name was changed from Black Lake. The Holland council, Ottawa County supervisors, and the Michigan Historical Commission approved the change. In 1832 surveyor Calvin Brittain named the lake Black River Lake. Macatawa is a literal translation of the Native American word meaning black.

== See also ==
- List of lakes in Michigan
