= Holland High School (Michigan) =

Location
- 600 VanRaalte Avenue; Holland, Michigan 49423; United States; 42.7738315°N 86.1231498°W

Information
- School type: Co-ed Public
- Opened: 1848; 178 years ago
- School district: Holland Public Schools
- Superintendent: Nick Cassidy
- NCES School ID: 261842005512
- Principal: Katie Pennington
- Teaching staff: 57.70 (on an FTE basis)
- Grades: 9–12
- Enrollment: 967 (2024-2025)
- Student to teacher ratio: 16.76
- Colors: Red; White
- Athletics: MHSAA Class A; D-3
- Athletics conference: OK Conference; Green Division
- Nickname: Dutch
- Yearbook: Boomerang
- Website: www.hollandpublicschools.org/our-schools/holland-high/

Holland High School is a Division 1 public high school in Holland, Michigan. The schools colors are Red and white. The athletic nickname is "The Dutch".

== Campus ==
The current facility was opened in 1962 on Van Raalte Avenue at a 10-12 facility. The campus consisted of seven buildings: East Unit, West Unit, Arts Center, Library and Administration, Fieldhouse, Industrial Arts and Performing Arts Center. The campus was previously at 96 W 15th st. Because the buildings were not connected, students went outside during class changes.

Renovations in 1990 and 1991 connected all buildings except the Performing Arts Center and also added a building for Math and Science. In addition, new offices, an auxiliary gym and a cafeteria were constructed. The ninth grade moved to Holland High in the fall of 1992 from Holland Junior High.

Holland High was under major reconstruction from 2012 to 2014 and all wings except for the gyms and the Performing Arts Center were completely rebuilt on their original footprints. The building housed grades 8 - 12 from 2009 to 2018, and began hosting 9-12 only in the 2018-19 school year. There are two amphitheaters in the school.

== Band ==
The Holland High Marching Band is known for performing in wooden shoes during parades. The band's trademark song is "Tiptoe Through the Tulips", which it performs ever year during Holland's annual Tulip Time Festival.

== Demographics ==
The demographic breakdown of the 1,055 students enrolled in 2020–2021 was:

- Male - 50.5%
- Female - 49.5%
- Asian - 2.6%
- Black - 7.5%
- Hispanic - 49.8%
- Pacific Islander - 0.1%
- White - 35.9%
- Multiracial - 4.5%

In addition, 617 students (58.5%) were eligible for reduced-price or free lunch.

== Notable alumni ==
- Betsy Aardsma, victim of a 1969 murder at Pennsylvania State University
- Bob Armstrong, professional basketball player for the Philadelphia Warriors
- Coreontae DeBerry, professional basketball player
- Hopwood DePree, writer, actor, director, and producer
- John Essebagger Jr., U.S. Army corporal and posthumous Medal of Honor recipient for actions in the Korean War
- Tom Maentz, college football player and captain of the 1956 Michigan Wolverines
- William C. Vandenberg, 49th Lieutenant Governor of Michigan (1951–1953)
- Andy Van Hekken, professional baseball pitcher who played in Major League Baseball for the Detroit Tigers
- Gordon Douglas Yntema, U.S. Army sergeant and posthumous Medal of Honor recipient for actions in the Vietnam War
