= Park Township, Ottawa County, Michigan =

Park Township, Michigan
- Civil township
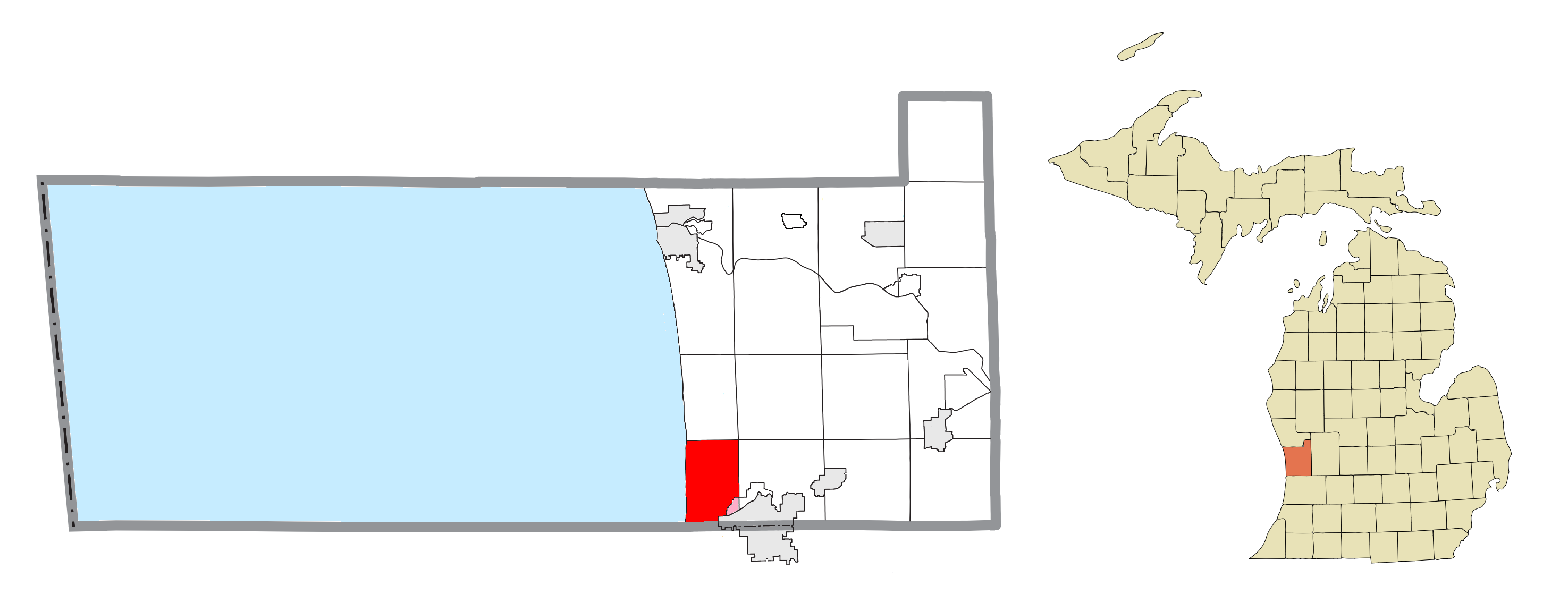
- Location within Ottawa County (red) and an administered portion of the CDP of Beechwood (pink)

- Location within the state of Michigan Location within the United States
- Coordinates: 42°47′54″N 86°10′47″W
- Country: United States
- State: Michigan
- County: Ottawa
- Established: 1915

Government
  - Supervisor: Jim Gerard
  - Clerk: Skip Keeter

Area
  - Total: 21.32 sq mi (55.22 km^{2})
  - Land: 19.20 sq mi (49.73 km^{2})
  - Water: 2.12 sq mi (5.49 km^{2})
- Elevation: 610 ft (186 m)

Population (2020)
  - Total: 18,625
  - Density: 970.1/sq mi (374.6/km^{2})
- Time zone: UTC-5 (Eastern (EST))
  - Summer (DST): UTC-4 (EDT)
- ZIP code(s): 49423 (Holland); 49424 (Beechwood); 49434 (Macatawa)
- Area code: 616
- FIPS code: 26-62460
- GNIS feature ID: 1626882
- Website: Official website

Park Township is a civil township of Ottawa County in the U.S. state of Michigan. As of the 2020 census, the township population was 18,625.

== History ==
Park Township was originally part of Holland Township. It was part of Holland Township in 1912. Park Township was established in 1915.

== Communities ==
- Beechwood is a census-designated place on the north shore of Lake Macatawa, primarily within Holland Township, but with a small portion in Park Township.
- Macatawa is a small unincorporated community near Lake Michigan on Lake Macatawa that once was home to resorts catering to visitors from Chicago. Nearly all of these resorts were destroyed in several fires. It is now home to cottages only. The community is on the boundary between Laketown Township in Allegan County and Park Township in Ottawa County, however it is on the south side of Lake Macatawa separated from most of Park Township at 42°46′11″N 86°12′22″W.
- Waukazoo Woods is a neighborhood on the north shore of Lake Macatawa. Present day Waukazoo Woods was formerly an Ottawa Indian village, which was led by Chief Waukazoo. In the early 1900s, Wauakazoo, a popular summer destination for tourists, was home to the Waukazoo Inn, a hotel. The Waukazoo Inn was demolished in 1960, being replaced by private homes.

== Geography ==
According to the United States Census Bureau, the township has a total area of 21.3 square miles (55 km^{2}), of which 19.3 square miles (50 km^{2}) is land and 2.0 square miles (5.2 km^{2}) (9.62%) is water. The southernmost part of the township is completely separated from the rest by Lake Macatawa.

== Demographics ==
As of the census of 2000, there were 17,579 people, 6,113 households, and 4,951 families residing in the township. The population density was 912.0 inhabitants per square mile (352.1/km^{2}). There were 6,926 housing units at an average density of 359.3 per square mile (138.7/km^{2}). The racial makeup of the township was 93.55% White, 0.45% African American, 0.18% Native American, 2.14% Asian, 0.02% Pacific Islander, 2.18% from other races, and 1.48% from two or more races. Hispanic or Latino of any race were 5.46% of the population.

There were 6,113 households, out of which 41.8% had children under the age of 18 living with them, 73.2% were married couples living together, 5.7% had a female householder with no husband present, and 19.0% were non-families. 15.6% of all households were made up of individuals, and 4.1% had someone living alone who was 65 years of age or older. The average household size was 2.87 and the average family size was 3.22.

In the township the population was spread out, with 30.9% under the age of 18, 6.4% from 18 to 24, 30.4% from 25 to 44, 24.6% from 45 to 64, and 7.7% who were 65 years of age or older. The median age was 35 years. For every 100 females, there were 100.2 males. For every 100 females age 18 and over, there were 98.7 males.

The median income for a household in the township was $65,328, and the median income for a family was $72,647. Males had a median income of $51,124 versus $31,486 for females. The per capita income for the township was $28,777. About 1.4% of families and 2.6% of the population were below the poverty line, including 2.6% of those under age 18 and 0.6% of those age 65 or over.

== Education ==
- West Ottawa High School North Campus
- Lakeshore Elementary School
