= Bass River Recreation Area =

Recreation area in Michigan, United States

Bass River State Recreation Area
- Location within Michigan Location within the United States
- Location: Ottawa County, Michigan, USA
- Nearest city: Allendale, Michigan
- Coordinates: 43.0134°N 86.02744°W
- Area: 1,665 acres (674 ha)
- Established: 1993
- Governing body: Michigan Department of Natural Resources
- Website: Official website

Bass River State Recreation Area is a 1,665-acre (674 ha) recreation area, located in Allendale Charter Township and Robinson Township, Ottawa County, Michigan. It is located at the mouth of the Bass River, where the smaller river flows into the Grand River.

The area offers approximately three miles of frontage on the larger river. Much of the recreation area is used to repurpose and rehabilitate an extensive field of gravel pits from which construction aggregate was quarried in the 20th century. The nearest large community is Allendale, Michigan. There is a multi-purpose, 6-mile (9.7 km) trail that is used for cross country skiing, hiking, horseback riding and mountain biking. A gravel boat launch provides access to Max Lake and the Grand River. Hunting is allowed in the recreation area.
