= Spoonville Site =

Archaeological site in Michigan, United States

- U.S. National Register of Historic Places
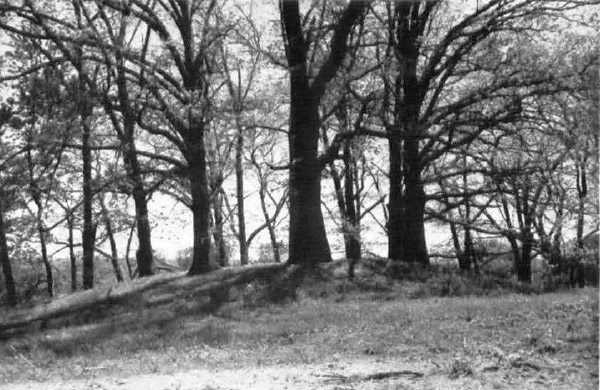
- Old photo prior to the destruction of the mounds

- Location within Michigan Location within the United States
- Location: Crockery Creek and Grand River
- Nearest city: Crockery Township, Michigan
- Coordinates: 43°2′40″N 86°4′50″W
- Area: 4 acres (1.6 ha)
- NRHP reference No.: 73002158
- Added to NRHP: March 30, 1973

The Spoonville Site, also designated 20OT1, is a historic archeological site, located on the banks of the Grand River in Crockery Township, Ottawa County, Michigan, United States. It was placed on the National Register of Historic Places in 1973.

== History ==
In 1856, John Spoon and his brother, Daniel, arrived in this location and constructed a sawmill. Eventually a small town, Spoonville, grew up around the site, and in 1871, was established as a station on the Chicago and Michigan Lake Shore Railroad. Spoon discovered three mounds on his property. One of these, reportedly 100 ft (30 m) long and 15 ft (4.6 m) high, was destroyed in the construction of the sawmill.

== Archaeology ==
The site, located on a terrace between Crockery Creek and the Grand River, was the location of a large Middle Woodland period village and burial mound complex.

The first archaeological investigation of the site was conducted by Able Anderson in 1857. Anderson excavated one of the mounds, reporting human remains and other artifacts. In 1876, William D. Gunning carried out further excavation at the site. More recent excavations were conducted in 1962, and excavation of the village at the site continued through the next few decades.

== Gallery ==
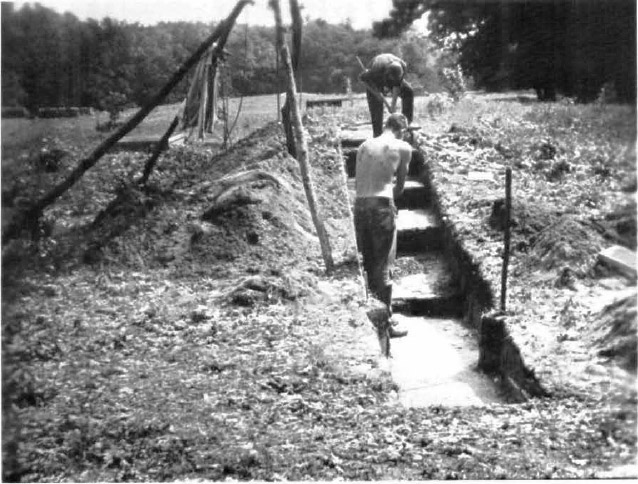
Spoonville archaeological site - trenching in 1962

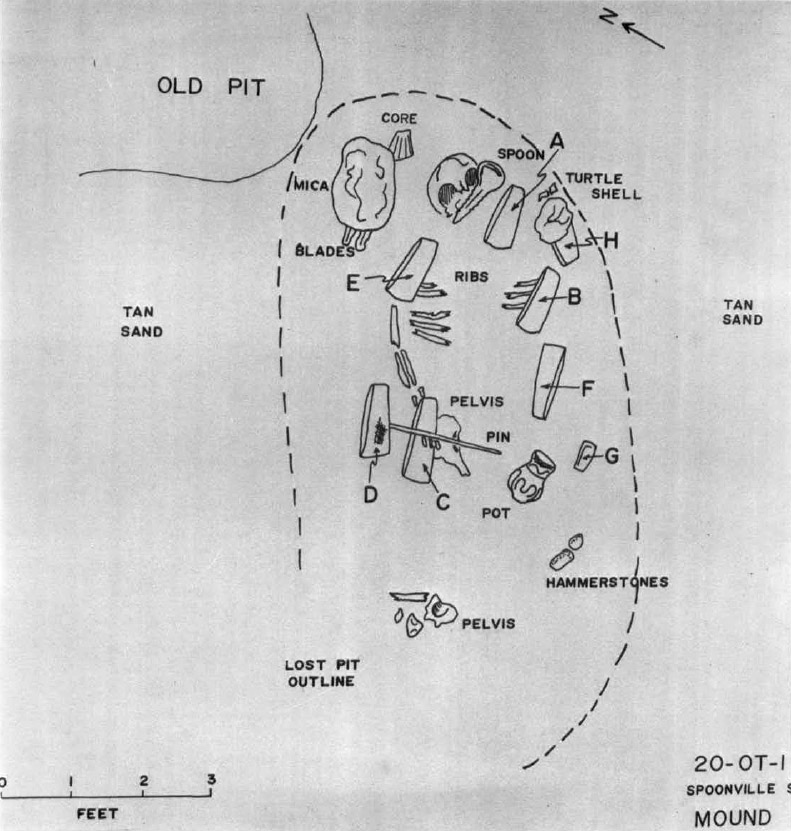
Spoonville archaeological site - burial map of mound 2

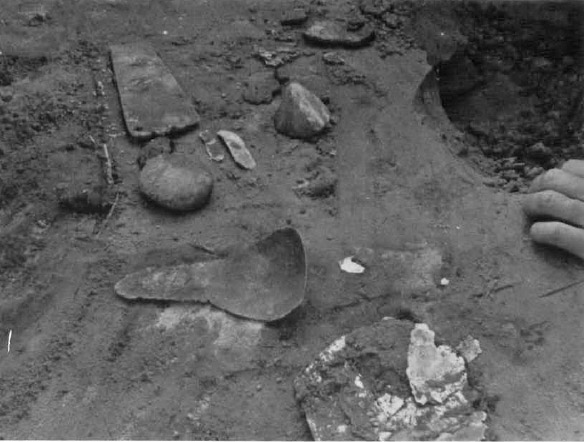
Spoonville archaeological site - 1969 excavation, copper, fint, and mica artifacts

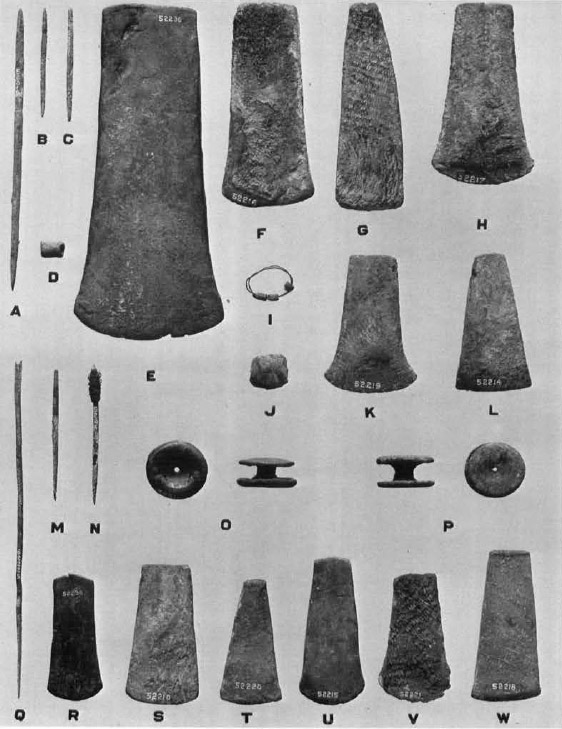
Spoonville archaeological site - artifacts from early excavations housed at Field Museum
