= Battle Point Site =

Archaeological site in Michigan, United States

- U.S. National Register of Historic Places
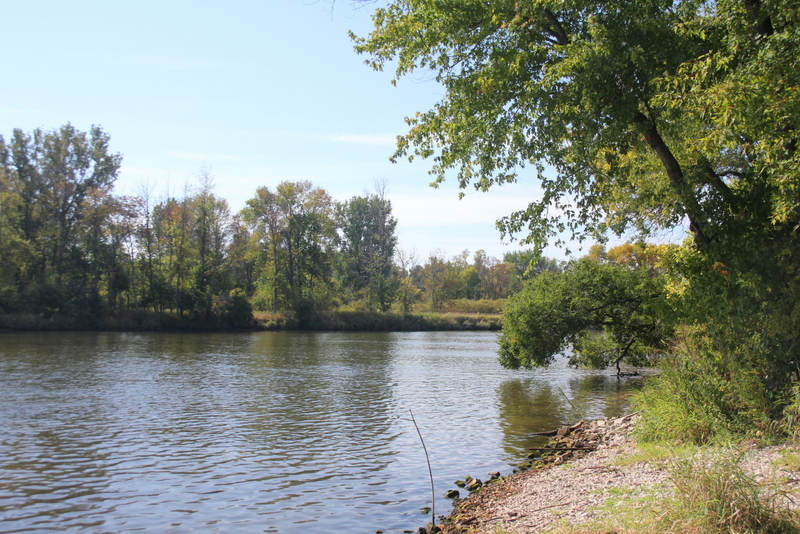

- Location within Michigan Location within the United States
- Location: Battle Point, Grand River
- Coordinates: 43°2′20″N 86°8′40″W
- Area: 2 acres (0.81 ha)
- NRHP reference No.: 73000956
- Added to NRHP: August 14, 1973

The Battle Point Site, also designated 20OT50, is an archaeological site located on Battle Point, along the Grand River in Crockery Township, Ottawa County, Michigan. It was listed on the National Register of Historic Places in 1973.

== Historical context ==
Battle Point was the site of Fort Village and an Odawa Indian burial ground, likely used for a span of about 20 years between 1815 and 1835. The Odawa at the site were led by Chief Onamontapay.

In 1836, the Treaty of Washington ceded the lands north of the Grand River to the United States. As a result, the Potawatomi Chief Shiawassee, then living upriver at the confluence of Crockery Creek and the Grand River, called a council at Battle Point, where he attempted to induce the Odawa living there and other local groups to revolt and massacre European settlers. However, the Rev. William Ferry and his Indian friends successfully defused the situation.

However, Chief Shiawassee and his Potawatomi soon moved out of the area, and the village at Battle Point was abandoned by the Odawa at about the same time. However, some Odawa families continued to live in the area, and a Native American school was established on Battle Point in 1855. These families continued to live in the Battle Point area as late as 1878.

== Archaeological excavations ==
The burial sites on Battle Point were forgotten for many years. However, the site was brought to the attention of amateur archaeologists in the 1950s, when erosion from the cutting action of the nearby river uncovered some of the burial sites. Five of these were excavated at that time by the Coffinberry chapter of the Michigan Archaeological Society. Nine further graves were excavated in 1971-2 by researchers from Grand Valley State University.

The artifacts recovered from the burial sites were primarily American and European trade goods. These included utilitarian goods such as knives, firesteels, gunflints, axes, and kettles. Also included were decorative goods such as silver brooches and bracelets, clay pipes, and glass beads.
