= M-231 (Michigan highway) =

State highway in Ottawa County, Michigan, United States

M-231
- M-231 highlighted in red

Route information
- Maintained by MDOT
- Length: 7.212 mi (11.607 km)
- Existed: October 30, 2015–present
- History: Construction started in 2011

Major junctions
- South end: M-45 near Robinson
- M-104 near Nunica
- North end: I-96 near Nunica

Location
- Country: United States
- State: Michigan
- Counties: Ottawa

Highway system
- Michigan State Trunkline Highway System; Interstate; US; State; Byways
← M-227	→ M-239

M-231 is the designation of a state trunkline highway in the Lower Peninsula of the US state of Michigan that serves as a partial bypass to US Highway 31 (US 31) around Grand Haven. This highway was built south of Interstate 96 (I-96) as an additional crossing over the Grand River. The route runs from M-45 northward and across the river to a connection with I-96 near the current M-104 interchange.

The Michigan Department of Transportation (MDOT) announced the proposed highway in early November 2006. The new corridor was funded through a Congressional appropriation and a state employment program. The Grand River bridge construction was originally planned for 2010 while the land for the project was being acquired. Other smaller bridges were included in the original plans. Roadway construction was scheduled for 2012. Recent developments in MDOT schedules had construction starting on the Grand River bridge after federal approval was secured with the remainder of the project deferred until additional funding is in place. The road opened on October 30, 2015, as a two-lane, limited-access highway.

== Route description ==
M-231 begins along M-45 (Lake Michigan Drive) in Robinson Township near the intersection with 120th Avenue. It runs due north through a mix of farm fields and forest lands in Ottawa County. The highway is a two-lane, limited-access highway. The trunkline crosses North Cedar Drive on an overpass, and then it crosses the Grand River into Crockery Township. As it crosses the river, M-231 angles northeasterly before intersecting M-104 the latter's eastern terminus at I-96, and M-231 continues north to its own northern terminus at a new partial interchange with I-96.

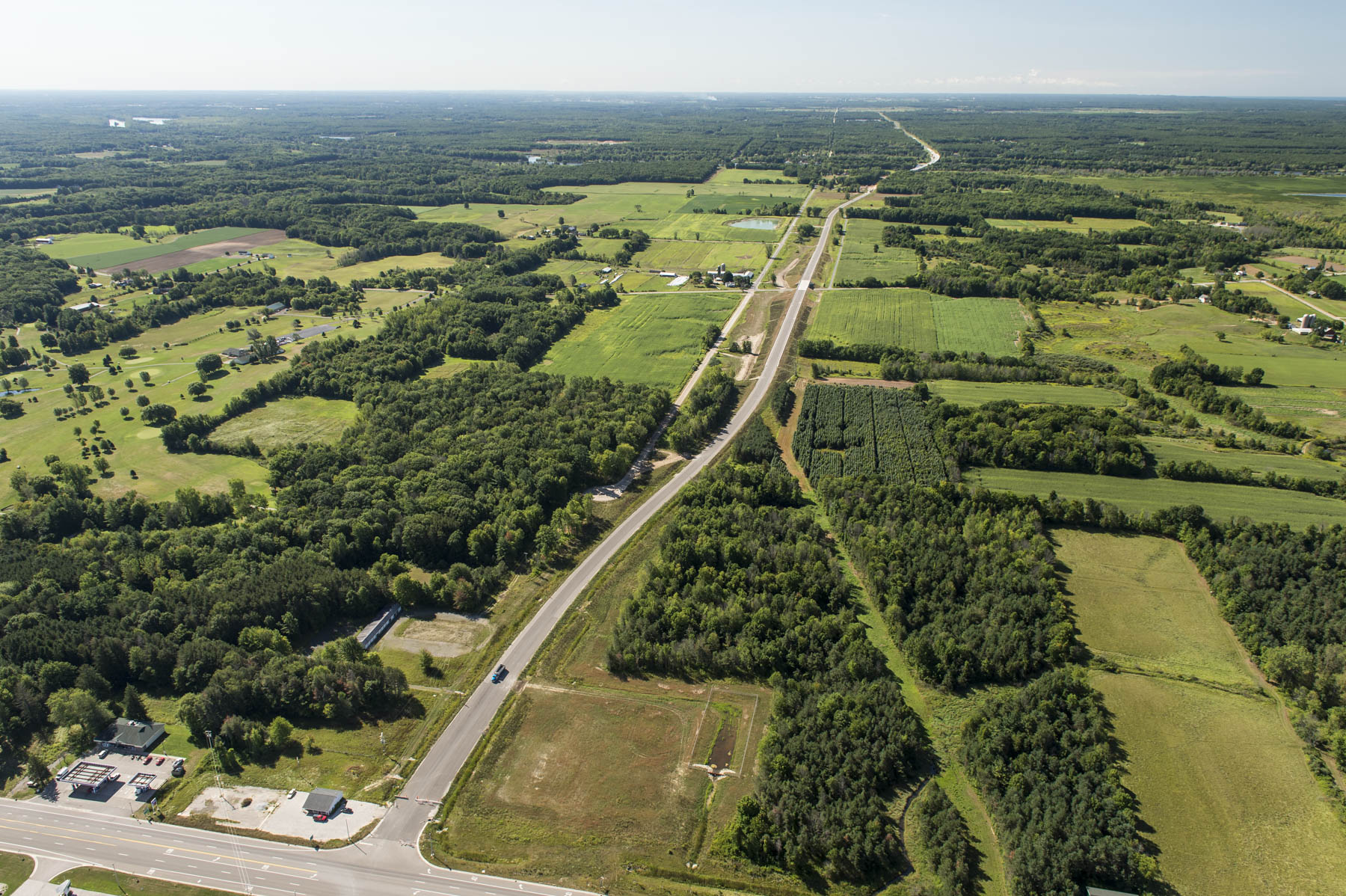
Aerial view of M-231 in August 2015

Even though it does not physically connect to that highway, M-231 is a scaled-down bypass of US 31 through Grand Haven. The highway is expected to reduce response times for emergency services in the area by shortening the driving distance across the Grand River. The bridge over the river, including approaches over adjacent wetlands, is the seventh-longest in the state at 3,709 feet (1,131 m) and sits 47 feet (14 m) above the river. Seven other bridges along M-231 bring the total to nearly a mile (1.6 km) for the entire highway.

The highway project included the construction of a non-motorized pathway parallel to the road. The path was built using funds from the Michigan Department of Transportation Alternative Program, and it was designed as part of a collection of bike trails to connect the Lake Michigan shoreline with Grand Rapids and across the Grand River. The four-mile-long (6.4 km) trail was dedicated on October 17, 2015, as the "Sgt. Henry E. Plant Memorial Grand River Bridge Non-Motorized Pathway", named for Ottawa County's first Medal of Honor recipient, Henry E. Plant, a veteran of the American Civil War.

== History ==
Initial planning for what is now M-231 started before 1990. In 2006, the Michigan Department of Transportation (MDOT) was acquiring land for the highway right-of-way and designing sections of the highway. The route going to the Grand River from M-45 was being designed at this time as well. The department was expecting the construction of the bridge over the river to begin in 2010 and last until at least 2013. There was another small creek or river that also required a bridge to be built. That project was projected to begin in 2011 and end in 2012. One more bridge was being considered over Leonard Street, a major street that runs east to west halfway between I-96 and the Grand River. Construction of that bridge was projected to begin in 2012. On I-96 itself, a bridge that went over the abandoned Grand Trunk Western Railroad was projected to be replaced starting in 2012. Further work on I-96 was projected to begin in 2012 to create the new interchange between it and M-231. That included extending 112th Avenue over I-96 and placing a bridge over the M-231 ramp for I-96. The last item on the five-year plan list was the 2.5 miles (4.0 km) running from the Grand River to I-96. That construction was also projected to begin in 2012.

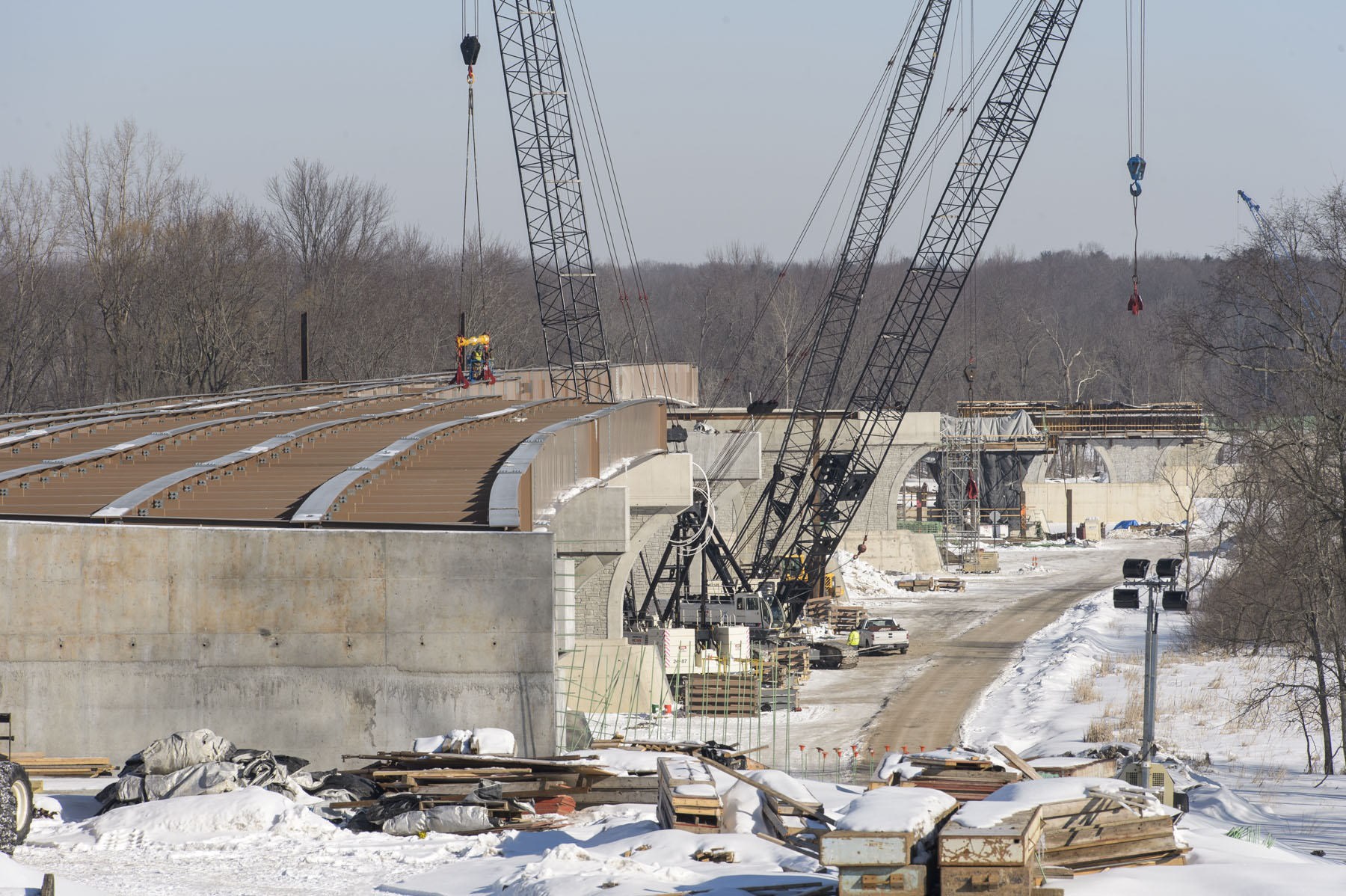
Grand River bridge approaches under construction in March 2014

The 2005 SAFETEA-LU transportation bill provided funding earmarked for the project by US Representative Pete Hoekstra from Holland as well as matching funds from the state's Michigan Jobs Today program. The total cost of the project was expected to be near $150 million (equivalent to $224 million in 2024).

In late 2009, the five-year plan for 2010–14 was released with a much different construction schedule. The bridge over the Grand River was to be built starting in 2010 following the final approvals from the Federal Highway Administration (FHWA) in late 2009 or early 2010. Only the bridge substructure and approaches were being constructed, with the remainder of M-231 to be deferred until future five-year plans. On April 23, 2010, FHWA approved the M-231 project with a record of decision (ROD). This document allowed MDOT to begin the final engineering, land acquisitions and construction of the project. MDOT announced plans at that time to start the Grand River Bridge construction in late 2010 or early 2011, with the remaining project plans deferred until funding issues were resolved. The ROD also encompassed planned improvements to the US 31 corridor north of Holland and in Grand Haven. Construction on the roadway started on March 28, 2011, with the demolition of three homes in Robinson Township. At least one other home was moved from the path of the road as well.

By January 4, 2013, MDOT had completed work on a bridge over North Cedar Drive, additional ramps at the I-96 and M-104 interchange, and reconstruction and widening of M-104 near I-96. The department had also completed a reconfiguration of the intersection between M-104 and Cleveland Drive and widening the bridge that carries M-104 over I-96. The expected date of completion for M-231 was set for sometime in 2016 pending funding availability. MDOT planned to build 1.4 miles (2.3 km) of the new highway in 2013, including the bridges over the Grand River and Little Robinson Creek.

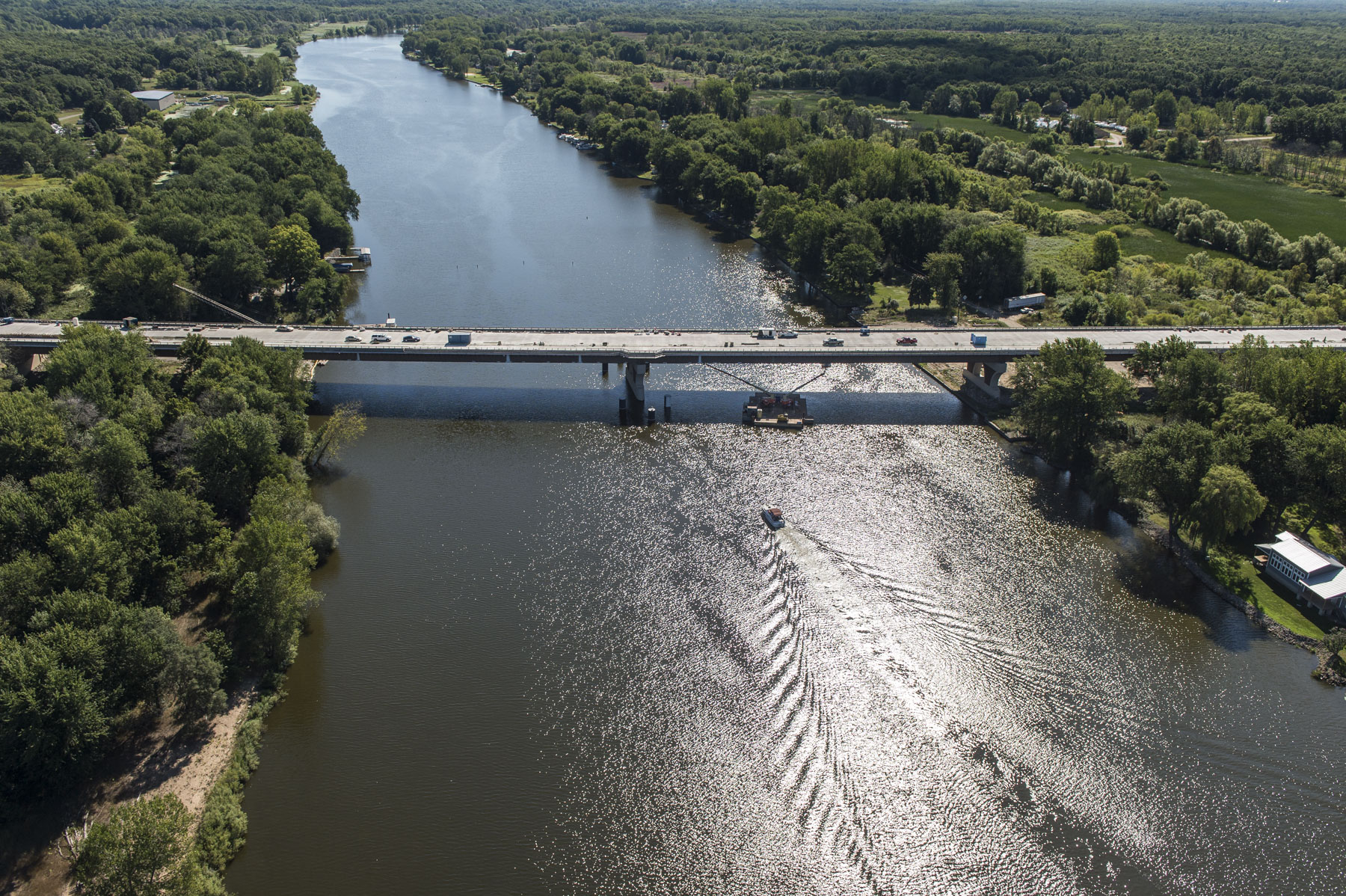
Grand River bridge in August 2015

Bridge construction was delayed over Grand River flooding in spring 2013. In 2014, the new interchange at I-96 was completed. The steel beams spanning the river were not set in place until August 2014. MDOT announced in August 2015 that they would hold a "M23.1k Run" on October 3, 2015, before the highway opened to traffic. The agency limited participation to 231 runners. The highway opened to traffic on October 30, 2015, and the total cost for M-231 was estimated at $180 million.

== Future ==
In early 2020, local homeowners received notices related to potential zoning changes in Zeeland Township related to a proposed southern extension of M-231 between M-45 and I-196. At the time, MDOT did not have funding nor a timeline for such an extension, although they identified a potential corridor to local media. Ottawa County is working with local communities such as Zeeland Township on these zoning changes that are designed to preserve potential right-of-way for the highway.

== Major intersections ==
The entire route is in Ottawa County.

Location	mi	km	Destinations	Notes
Robinson Township	0.000	0.000	M-45 (Lake Michigan Drive)	
Grand River	4.620– 4.723	7.435– 7.601	Grand River bridge	
Crockery Township	7.051	11.347	M-104 (Cleveland Street)	Provides eastbound entrance to, and westbound exit from, I-96
Crockery Township	7.212	11.607	I-96 west – Muskegon	Exit 9 on I-96; eastbound exit to, and westbound entrance from, I-96
1.000 mi = 1.609 km; 1.000 km = 0.621 mi: Incomplete access
