= Battle Point =

Battle Point may refer to:

- Battle Point, Antarctica, a coastal headland on the east coast of Graham Land
- Battle Point, Bainbridge Island, Washington, a community of Bainbridge Island
- Battle Point Site, an archaeological site in Crockery Township, Ottawa County, Michigan
