= Sullivan Township, Michigan =

- Township
- Location within Michigan Location within the United States
- Coordinates: 43°10′13″N 86°4′31″W
- Country: United States
- State: Michigan
- County: Muskegon

Area
  - Total: 24.1 sq mi (62.4 km^{2})
  - Land: 24.1 sq mi (62.4 km^{2})
  - Water: 0 sq mi (0.0 km^{2})
- Elevation: 650 ft (198 m)

Population (2020)
  - Total: 2,541
  - Density: 105.5/sq mi (40.7/km^{2})
- Time zone: UTC-5 (Eastern (EST))
  - Summer (DST): UTC-4 (EDT)
- ZIP Codes: 49415 (Fruitport); 49448 (Nunica); 49451 (Ravenna); 49444 (Muskegon)
- FIPS code: 26-121-77100
- GNIS feature ID: 1627132
- Website: sullivantownship.com

Sullivan Township is a civil township of Muskegon County in the U.S. state of Michigan. As of the 2020 census, the township population was 2,541.

== Geography ==
The township is in southern Muskegon County, bordered to the south by Ottawa County. The center of the township is 7 miles (11 km) by road northeast of Fruitport, 13 miles (21 km) southeast of Muskegon, the county seat, and 14 miles (23 km) northwest of Coopersville.

According to the U.S. Census Bureau, the township has a total area of 24.1 square miles (62 km^{2}), of which 0.03 square miles (0.08 km^{2}), or 0.10%, are water. The majority of the township is in the Grand River watershed: the southern part drains to Crockery Creek, which joins the Grand River south of Nunica, while the center of the township drains southwest via Norris Creek to Fruitport, where it enters Spring Lake, an arm of the Grand River connected to Lake Michigan. The northernmost part of the township drains to Black Creek, the main tributary of Mona Lake, a separate arm of Lake Michigan.

== Demographics ==
Historical population
Census	Pop.	Note	%±
1900	447		—
1910	413		−7.6%
1920	479		16.0%
1930	542		13.2%
1940	660		21.8%
1950	1,020		54.5%
1960	1,577		54.6%
1970	2,051		30.1%
1980	2,356		14.9%
1990	2,230		−5.3%
2000	2,477		11.1%
2010	2,441		−1.5%
2020	2,541		4.1%
U.S. Decennial Census

As of the census of 2000, there were 2,477 people, 887 households, and 714 families residing in the township. The population density was 102.8 inhabitants per square mile (39.7/km^{2}). There were 905 housing units at an average density of 37.6 per square mile (14.5/km^{2}). The racial makeup of the township was 97.30% White, 0.73% African American, 0.36% Native American, 0.20% Asian, 0.69% from other races, and 0.73% from two or more races. Hispanic or Latino of any race were 2.22% of the population.

There were 887 households, out of which 35.4% had children under the age of 18 living with them, 69.0% were married couples living together, 6.7% had a female householder with no husband present, and 19.5% were non-families. 15.7% of all households were made up of individuals, and 6.3% had someone living alone who was 65 years of age or older. The average household size was 2.79 and the average family size was 3.10.

In the township the population was spread out, with 26.5% under the age of 18, 6.9% from 18 to 24, 28.8% from 25 to 44, 26.8% from 45 to 64, and 10.9% who were 65 years of age or older. The median age was 38 years. For every 100 females, there were 100.7 males. For every 100 females age 18 and over, there were 102.3 males.

The median income for a household in the township was $46,447, and the median income for a family was $51,394. Males had a median income of $36,968 versus $23,333 for females. The per capita income for the township was $19,360. About 4.0% of families and 5.3% of the population were below the poverty line, including 5.5% of those under age 18 and 9.4% of those age 65 or over.
