= Bass River (Michigan) =

Location
- Country: United States

Physical characteristics
- Source
  - location: Robinson Township, Ottawa County, Michigan
  - coordinates: 42.9778°N 86.03421°W
- Mouth
  - location: Grand River, Michigan
  - coordinates: 43.00502°N 86.0031°W
- Discharge
  - location: mouth
  - average: 54.91 cu ft/s (1.555 m^{3}/s) (estimate)

The Bass River is a 3.6-mile-long (5.8 km) stream in Ottawa County, Michigan. It flows into the Grand River and thence into Lake Michigan. At the Bass River's Grand River mouth is the Bass River State Recreation Area.

== See also ==
- List of rivers of Michigan
