= Mount Dater =

Mountain in Graham Land, Antarctica

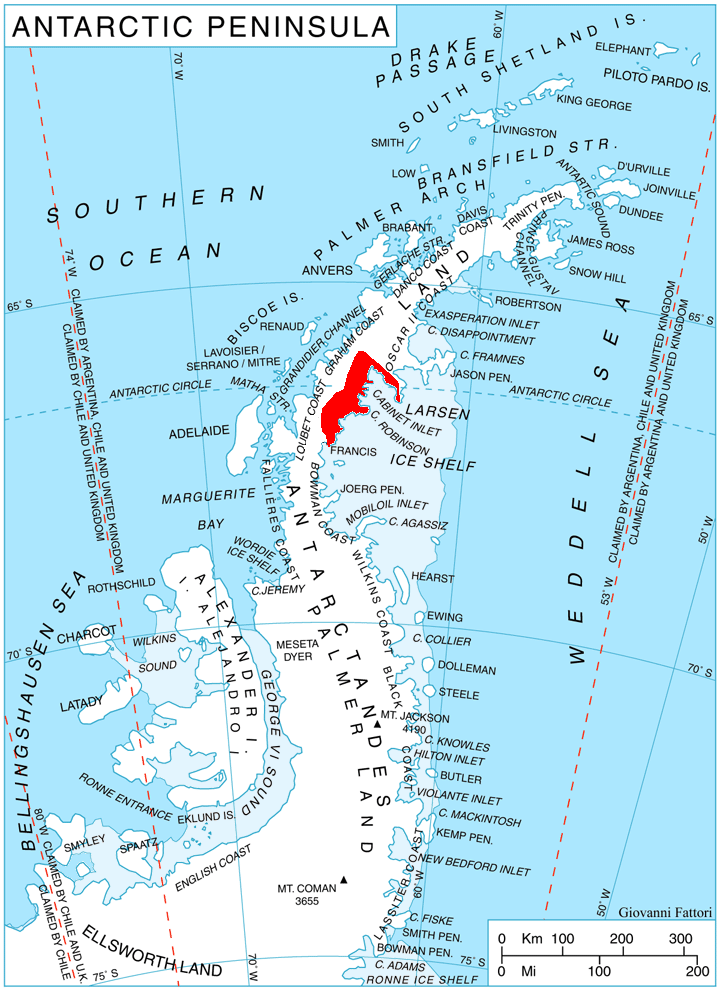
Location of Foyn Coast on Antarctic Peninsula.

Mount Dater (67°8′S 64°49′W) is a prominent flat-topped coastal mountain which is marked by distinctive rock spurs and steep cliffs, rising to 1,200 metres (3,900 ft) south of Mill Inlet on the Foyn Coast of Graham Land. The feature was roughly surveyed by the Falkland Islands Dependencies Survey in 1947, and it was photographed from the air by the Ronne Antarctic Research Expedition, in 1947, and the U.S. Navy in 1963. Following surveys were completed by the British Antarctic Survey in 1963–64. In association with the names of Antarctic historians grouped in this area, it was named by the UK Antarctic Place-Names Committee after Henry M. Dater (1909–74), a U.S. Navy Historian who was a member of the U.S. Advisory Committee on Antarctic Names from 1962–72 and the chairman during 1973–74. He was also co-author (with E. Schulthess, George J. Dufek, and Raymond Priestly) of Antarctica, Zurich, 1959.

== See also ==
- Battle Point, Antarctica
