= M-45 (Michigan highway) =

State highway in Ottawa and Kent counties in Michigan, United States

M-45
- Lake Michigan Drive
- M-45 highlighted in red

Route information
- Maintained by MDOT
- Length: 24.434 mi (39.323 km)
- Existed: 1964–present

Major junctions
- West end: US 31 in Agnew
- M-231 near Robinson: M-11 in Walker
- East end: I-196 in Grand Rapids

Location
- Country: United States
- State: Michigan
- Counties: Ottawa, Kent

Highway system
- Michigan State Trunkline Highway System; Interstate; US; State; Byways
| ← US 45 | → M-46 |

M-45 is a state trunkline highway in the US state of Michigan that is also called Lake Michigan Drive. The highway runs from Agnew near Lake Michigan to the west side of Grand Rapids in the western Lower Peninsula. Lake Michigan Drive continues in each direction from M-45's termini, extending west of US Highway 31 (US 31) and east of Interstate 196 (I-196). In between, the road runs through rural and suburban areas of Ottawa and Kent counties, including the main campus of Grand Valley State University in Allendale. Lake Michigan Drive was originally part of M-50 until the mid-1960s. Previously in the 1920s and 1930s, the M-45 number was designated along a highway in the Upper Peninsula (UP).

== Route description ==
Lake Michigan Drive starts near Lake Michigan at an intersection with Lakeshore Drive near the Grand Rapids water filtration plant. The road runs east to an intersection with US 31 in Agnew, where the M-45 designation begins. The area is marked by a mix of woodland and agricultural properties. The road runs through rural Ottawa County to Allendale. Through town, Lake Michigan Drive widens to a four-lane divided boulevard with a median. East of the main part of town, M-45 passes the main campus of Grand Valley State University before crossing the Grand River. At 24th Avenue, the highway loses its median and gains a central turn lane. The landscape becomes more suburban as the highway crosses into Kent County near the M-11 intersection in Walker. From here east to the terminus in Grand Rapids, the road is lined with residential subdivisions and commercial properties. At Bridge Street, Lake Michigan Drive turns to the southeast and approaches John Ball Zoological Garden. M-45 ends at the interchange with I-196. Lake Michigan Drive continues east to its end where it becomes Pearl Street near the Grand River downtown.

The Michigan Department of Transportation (MDOT) maintains M-45 like all other parts of the state trunkline highway system. As part of these responsibilities, the department tracks the volume of the traffic using its roadways which is expressed using a metric called average annual daily traffic (AADT). This is a calculation of the traffic levels for a segment of roadway for any average day of the year. In 2009, 4,910 vehicles used the section of M-45 near the western terminus daily. Near the interchange with I-196, 32,376 vehicles were observed along Lake Michigan Drive each day. No segment of the highway is listed on the National Highway System, a network of roads important to the country's economy, defense, and mobility.

== History ==
=== Previous designation ===
M-45 was originally designated in the UP on what is now M-95 by July 1, 1919. The highway ran between M-12 in Sagola and M-15 in Humboldt Township. When the United States Numbered Highway System was created on November 11, 1926, US 2 replaced most of M-12 through the UP. M-45 was extended south of Sagola to the north side of Iron Mountain. Along with this change, M-69 replaced another previous section of M-12 and all of M-90. M-69 ran concurrently with M-45 between Sagola and Randville to connect these two highway segments. By 1933, M-45 was extended concurrently along US 2/US 141 into Iron Mountain and then as an independent routing through Kingsford to the Wisconsin state line. Before the next year, the M-95 replaced M-45 in the UP.

=== Current designation ===
The current designation of M-45 dates back to 1964. M-50 was truncated to end near Lowell at I-96. The remainder of M-50 on Cascade Road, Fulton Street and Lake Michigan Drive was redesignated as M-45. The eastern section from Business US 131 (Division Avenue) to I-96 was turned over to local control in 1972, shortening the route. The east end would be shortened again by 1995, removing the M-45 designation east of I-196. Jurisdiction was only transferred to the City of Grand Rapids on the portion from Division Avenue west to the Grand River, leaving part of West Fulton Street under state maintenance as an unsigned trunkline. M-45 was upgraded to a four-lane divided highway in 2001–02 between Walker and the Grand Valley State campus in Allendale. The new alignment bypassed a section of road between 24th and 40th avenues. That section was renamed River Hill Drive, but retained as an unsigned state trunkline (Old M-45).

== Major intersections ==
| County | Location | mi | km | Destinations | Notes |
|---|---|---|---|---|---|
| Ottawa | Agnew | 0.000 | 0.000 | US 31 / LMCT – Grand Haven, Holland, Muskegon | |
| Ottawa | Robinson Township | 4.707 | 7.575 | M-231 north to I-96 west – Muskegon | Southern terminus of M-231 |
| Kent | Walker | 20.581 | 33.122 | M-11 – Grandville, Walker | |
| Kent | Grand Rapids | 24.434 | 39.323 | I-196 – Grand Rapids, Holland | Exit 75 on I-196 |
1.000 mi = 1.609 km; 1.000 km = 0.621 mi
