= Nunica, Michigan =

- Census-designated place (CDP) & unincorporated community
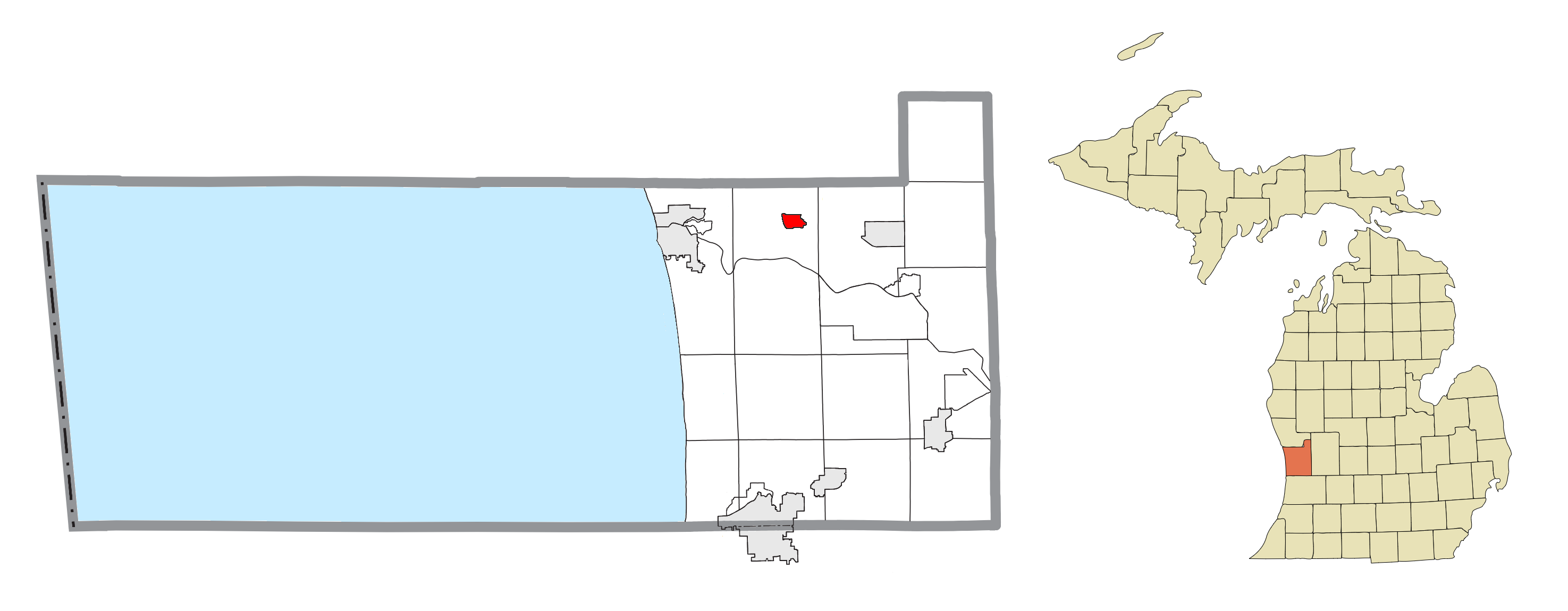
- Location within Ottawa County

- Location within the state of Michigan Location within the United States
- Coordinates: 43°04′47″N 86°04′02″W
- Country: United States
- State: Michigan
- County: Ottawa
- Township: Crockery

Area
  - Total: 1.83 sq mi (4.75 km^{2})
  - Land: 1.83 sq mi (4.74 km^{2})
  - Water: 0.0039 sq mi (0.01 km^{2})
- Elevation: 630 ft (190 m)

Population (2020)
  - Total: 351
  - Density: 191.8/sq mi (74.1/km^{2})
- Time zone: UTC-5 (Eastern (EST))
  - Summer (DST): UTC-4 (EDT)
- ZIP code(s): 49448
- Area code: 616
- GNIS feature ID: 633785

Nunica is an unincorporated community in the U.S. state of Michigan. The community is located near the center of Crockery Township in Ottawa County, close to the junction of Interstate 96 (I-96), M-104, and M-231 at 43°04′47″N 86°04′02″W. As of the 2020 census, Nunica had a population of 351. The first white settlers were Manley Patchin in 1836 and William Hathaway, Jr., in 1839. Hathaway became the first postmaster of Crockery Creek on February 7, 1848. The name of the post office was changed to Nunica on January 8, 1859. The settlement was first platted by Henry Ernst in 1865. The name Nunica is derived from the Native American word menonica, meaning "clay earth", from which pottery was made. This clay was also the origin for the name of Crockery Creek. The Nunica ZIP code 49448 serves most of Crockery Township, as well as portions of Sullivan Township in Muskegon County to the north and small areas of Polkton Township to the east.

Historical population
Census	Pop.	Note	%±
2020	351		—
U.S. Decennial Census

== History ==
The Nunica vicinity has been inhabited by the Ottawa Native Americans for centuries. The name means "clay earth".

The first European explorers in the Ottawa County region were the French-Canadian explorers Louis Joliet and Father Jacques Marquette who passed through the region in the mid 17th century. European settlement in the area proceeded slowly until the mid-19th century, when zinc was discovered in nearby Crockery Creek in 1858. In 1872, the town of Nunica was officially incorporated, the name taken from the Ottawa word for zinc. The 1880 census showed approximately 1,000 settlers in the region.

Nunica experienced rapid growth in population in the early 20th century as settlers came to the region to mine zinc and farm. The settlement process was aided by the Grand Haven–Detroit branch of the Grand Trunk Western Railroad on which Nunica was an important stop. The 1920 census shows Nunica at the peak of its population, with 8,000 citizens.

By 1924 the zinc ore in the region had been completely exhausted. Coupled with a particularly severe influenza outbreak in 1927 that claimed the lives of nearly 800 people from the town, the population of Nunica declined. The 1930 census shows the population of Nunica as 5,000.

In 1935 nearly one-third of Nunica was destroyed by fire, in what became known locally as the great Nunica fire. It is speculated that the fire began when the Nunica train station was struck by lightning. In either case, the train station that had served as the main source of livelihood for the town was completely destroyed, along with such forgotten landmarks as the Nunica Conservatory for Music and other Fine Arts and the Nunica casino. None of these landmarks were ever rebuilt. In addition, nearly 150 acres (0.61 km^{2}) of farmland were completely destroyed.

Since the train station was never rebuilt, Nunica never recovered from the devastating fire and the population went into freefall. By 1950 there were only 1,000 citizens in the greater Nunica area. In 1957 the town was unincorporated. The current population of Nunica is estimated at 400.

A new highway has been built near the Nunica area just off I-96. M-231 has been built as a two-lane freeway so it can relieve traffic congestion at the U.S. Highway 31 drawbridge in Grand Haven. This highway was completed on October 30, 2015.

== Highways ==
- I-96
- M-104
- M-231
- County Highway B-31

== Works cited ==
- Barnes, Elizabeth. (1997). Boom and Bust: A Brief Oral History of Nunica, Grand Rapids: Kent Publishing House.
