= Crockery Township, Michigan =

- Civil township
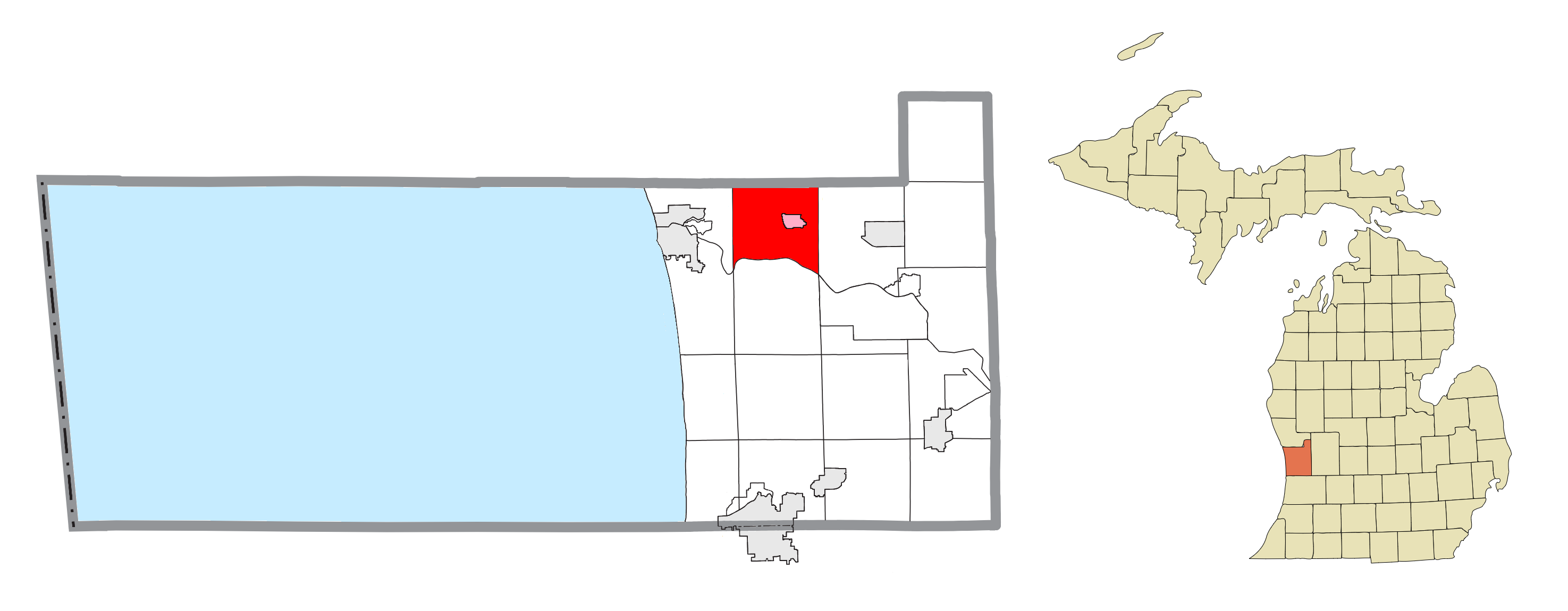
- Location within Ottawa County (red) and the administered CDP of Nunica (pink)

- Location within the state of Michigan Location within the United States
- Coordinates: 43°04′47″N 86°05′12″W
- Country: United States
- State: Michigan
- County: Ottawa

Government
  - Supervisor: Erik Erhorn
  - Clerk: Kathy Buchanan

Area
  - Total: 33.40 sq mi (86.51 km^{2})
  - Land: 32.45 sq mi (84.05 km^{2})
  - Water: 0.95 sq mi (2.46 km^{2})
- Elevation: 650 ft (198 m)

Population (2020)
  - Total: 4,572
  - Density: 140.9/sq mi (54.4/km^{2})
- Time zone: UTC-5 (Eastern (EST))
  - Summer (DST): UTC-4 (EDT)
- ZIP code(s): 49404 (Coopersville); 49415 (Fruitport); 49448 (Nunica); 49456 (Spring Lake)
- Area code: 616
- FIPS code: 26-18800
- GNIS feature ID: 1626140
- Website: Official website

Crockery Township is a civil township of Ottawa County in the U.S. state of Michigan. As of the 2020 census, the township population was 4,572.

== Communities ==
There are no incorporated municipalities within the township.

- Nunica is an unincorporated community and census-designated place located near the center of the township, close to the junction of Interstate 96 and M-104 at 43°04′47″N 86°04′02″W.
- Ottawa Center was a historical settlement along the Grand River in the southeast corner of Crockery Township at 43°01′46″N 86°01′52″W. Benjamin Smith became the first postmaster on July 11, 1853. A plat was recorded and entered in 1855. The name reflects its central location (east-west) and was considered as candidate for the county seat by county supervisors in 1856.
- Spoonville was a historical settlement where Crockery Creek flows into the Grand River. It was given a station on Chicago and Michigan Lake Shore Railroad in 1870. A swing bridge over the Grand River operated from 1871 until 1881 when it was abandoned in favor of another line.
- The city of Coopersville is to the east, and the Coopersville ZIP code 49404 serves areas in the eastern part of Crockery Township.
- The village of Fruitport is to the north in Muskegon County, and the Fruitport ZIP code 49415 serves areas in the northwest part of Crockery Township.
- The village of Spring Lake is to the west, and the Spring Lake ZIP code 49456 serves areas in the southwest part of Crockery Township.

== Geography ==
Spring Lake Township lies to the west, Muskegon County is to the north, and Polkton Township to the east. The Grand River forms the southern boundary, with Allendale Charter Township to the southeast, Robinson Township to the south, and Grand Haven Charter Township to the southwest. The Grand Haven urban area is about 10-mile (16 km) west of the center of the township and Coopersville is about 10 miles (16 km) to the east.

The township is drained entirely by tributaries of the Grand River, including the Crockery Creek in the eastern portion.

According to the United States Census Bureau, the township has a total area of 33.4 square miles (87 km^{2}), of which 32.7 square miles (85 km^{2}) is land and 0.7 square miles (1.8 km^{2}) (1.98%) is water.

== Demographics ==
As of the census of 2000, there were 3,782 people, 1,393 households, and 1,062 families residing in the township. The population density was 115.6 inhabitants per square mile (44.6/km^{2}). There were 1,475 housing units at an average density of 45.1 units per square mile (17.4 units/km^{2}). The racial makeup of the township was 96.59% White, 0.63% African American, 0.56% Native American, 0.11% Asian, 0.03% Pacific Islander, 0.74% from other races, and 1.35% from two or more races. Hispanic or Latino of any race were 1.72% of the population.

There were 1,393 households, out of which 36.9% had children under the age of 18 living with them, 63.7% were married couples living together, 8.6% had a female householder with no husband present, and 23.7% were non-families. 19.7% of all households were made up of individuals, and 5.6% had someone living alone who was 65 years of age or older. The average household size was 2.70 and the average family size was 3.08.

In the township the population was spread out, with 27.6% under the age of 18, 7.1% from 18 to 24, 31.5% from 25 to 44, 23.8% from 45 to 64, and 9.9% who were 65 years of age or older. The median age was 37 years. For every 100 females, there were 108.0 males. For every 100 females age 18 and over, there were 103.2 males.

The median income for a household in the township was $42,399, and the median income for a family was $50,219. Males had a median income of $39,031 versus $27,552 for females. The per capita income for the township was $19,089. About 5.6% of families and 6.3% of the population were below the poverty line, including 6.5% of those under age 18 and 10.5% of those age 65 or over.

== History ==
The Western Michigan region has been inhabited by the Ottawa Native Americans for centuries. It is from this tribe that the county takes its name.

The first European explorers in the Ottawa County region were the French-Canadian explorers Louis Joliet and Father Jacques Marquette, who passed through the region in the mid 17th century.

European settlement in the area proceeded slowly until the mid 19th century, when zinc was discovered in Crockery Creek in 1858. (Barnes, 1997) In 1872, the town of Nunica was officially incorporated, the name taken from the Ottawa word for zinc. The 1880 census showed approximately 1,000 settlers in the region. (Barnes, 1997)

== Notes and references ==
- Barnes, Elizabeth. (1997). Boom and Bust: A Brief Oral History of Nunica, Grand Rapids: Kent Publishing House.
- U.S. census data for Crockery township, 1880–1970.
