= Agnew, Michigan =

- Unincorporated community
- Location within the state of Michigan
- Coordinates: 42°57′54″N 86°10′36″W
- Country: United States
- State: Michigan
- County: Ottawa
- Charter township: Grand Haven
- Elevation: 627 ft (191 m)
- Time zone: UTC-5 (Eastern (EST))
  - Summer (DST): UTC-4 (EDT)
- Area code: 616
- GNIS feature ID: 619868

Agnew, Michigan is a tiny unincorporated community located at 42°57′54″N 86°10′36″W at the intersection of U.S. Highway 31 (US 31) and M-45 in Grand Haven Charter Township of Ottawa County in the U.S. state of Michigan. It shares a ZIP code with the nearby community of West Olive.

== History ==
Agnew was first known as "Johnsville" after John Behm, who was one of the early settlers in the area in the 1860s. A post office named Johnsville operated there from 1870 to 1875. It reopened in 1878 and was renamed "Agnew" on December 23, 1887. It was platted with the name "Village of Agnew" on May 16, 1889, by Edward E. Stites.

The settlement was named for JKV Agnew, a superintendent of the Chicago and West Michigan Railway, which had a station by that name there. The successor railroad, Pere Marquette Railway, closed the station and in 1952, the Michigan Department of Transportation determined it was easier to move the 12 remaining buildings to allow construction of US 31.
