= Grand Haven Golf Club =

Public golf course near Grand Haven, Michigan

Coordinates: 42°59′50″N 86°12′40″W

- Interactive map of Grand Haven Golf Club

Club information
- Location: Grand Haven Township, Ottawa County, near Grand Haven, Michigan, USA
- Established: 1965
- Type: Public
- Tota holes: 18
- Website: Grand Haven Golf Club

Grand Haven Golf Club is a public golf course located just south of Grand Haven, Michigan. Very close to the Lake Michigan shore, the golf course takes advantage of the thick hardwood forest and natural sand dunes of the southwest Michigan shoreline. Golf Digest magazine ranked the club as "one of the nation's Top 50 public courses" for over ten years. The club has hosted several significant events, including the LPGA Shoreline Classic.

== History ==
Originally established in 1965, the course was built and operated by the Matthews family of Grand Haven. According to its own web site, the club "had admittedly seen better days" when new ownership—the Rooney Golf Group, LLC. of Stillwater, Oklahoma—purchased the property in 1998.

A new clubhouse has been built and the course itself is undergoing renovation and improvement, with rolling fairways and fast, sharp-breaking greens. Currently, the course is 6789 yards from the black championship tees with a course/slope rating of 73.4/134. The white tees are 6194 yards with a rating of 70/128. The red tees (ladies/seniors/juniors) are 5284 yards with a rating of 70.6/122.

As announced on 5/27/2019, the course will be overhauled and re-designed as a Jack Nicklaus Signature Course through Nicklaus's design firm. The redesigned course will be named American Dunes Golf Club, and is scheduled to open on Memorial Day in 2020.
