= Grand Haven Charter Township, Michigan =

- Charter township
- Interactive map of Grand Haven Charter Township, Michigan
- Location within Michigan
- Coordinates: 42.9979°N 86.1889°W
- Country: United States
- State: Michigan
- County: Ottawa
- Founded: December 30, 1837

Government
  - Supervisor: Mark Reenders
  - Township Manager: William Cargo
  - Clerk: Laurie Larsen

Area
  - Total: 29.536 sq mi (76.498 km^{2})
  - Land: 28.700 sq mi (74.333 km^{2})
  - Water: 0.836 sq mi (2.166 km^{2}) 2.83%
- Elevation: 617 ft (188 m)

Population (2020)
  - Total: 18,004
  - Estimate (2025): 19,981
  - Density: 627.31/sq mi (242.21/km^{2})
- Time zone: UTC–5 (Eastern (EST))
  - Summer (DST): UTC–4 (EDT)
- ZIP Codes: 49417, 49460
- Area code: 616
- FIPS code: 26-139-33360
- GNIS feature ID: 1626370
- Highways: US 31, M-45
- Website: ghtmi.gov

Grand Haven Charter Township is a charter township of Ottawa County, Michigan, United States. The population was 18,004 as of the 2020 census, and was estimated at 19,981 in 2025. The city of Grand Haven is in the northern portion of the township but is administratively autonomous. Almost all of the township shares the city's ZIP code; a sliver in the south is served by the West Olive ZIP code.

== Communities ==
- Agnew is an unincorporated village in this Township near the junction of US 31 and M-45.

== Geography ==
According to the United States Census Bureau, the charter township has an area of 29.536 square miles (76.50 km^{2}), of which 28.700 square miles (74.33 km^{2}) is land and 0.836 square miles (2.17 km^{2}) (2.83%) is water.

== Demographics ==
Historical population
Census	Pop.	Note	%±
1970	5,489		—
1980	7,238		31.9%
1990	9,710		34.2%
2000	13,278		36.7%
2010	15,178		14.3%
2020	18,004		18.6%
2025 (est.)	19,981		11.0%
U.S. Decennial Census; 2020 Census

As of the 2024 American Community Survey, there were 7,384 estimated households in Grand Haven Charter Township with an average of 2.53 persons per household. The charter township has a median household income of $99,592. Approximately 5.6% of the charter township's population lives at or below the poverty line. Grand Haven Charter Township has an estimated 62.8% employment rate, with 45.7% of the population holding a bachelor's degree or higher and 95.8% holding a high school diploma. There were 7,828 housing units at an average density of 272.75 per square mile (105.31/km^{2}).

The top five reported languages (people were allowed to report up to two languages, thus the figures will generally add to more than 100%) were English (96.0%), Spanish (1.5%), Indo-European (1.6%), Asian and Pacific Islander (0.9%), and Other (0.0%).

The median age in the charter township was 42.5 years.

=== 2020 census ===
As of the 2020 census, there were 18,004 people, 6,878 households, and 5,084 families residing in the charter township. The population density was 627.32 inhabitants per square mile (242.21/km^{2}). There were 7,557 housing units at an average density of 263.31 per square mile (101.66/km^{2}). The racial makeup of the charter township was 89.90% White, 0.87% African American, 0.56% Native American, 1.67% Asian, 0.02% Pacific Islander, 1.13% from some other races and 5.87% from two or more races. Hispanic or Latino people of any race were 4.23% of the population.

=== 2010 census ===
As of the 2010 census, there were 15,178 people, 5,547 households, and 4,373 families residing in the charter township. The population density was 529.22 inhabitants per square mile (204.33/km^{2}). There were 6,219 housing units at an average density of 216.84 per square mile (83.72/km^{2}). The racial makeup of the charter township was 95.78% White, 0.28% African American, 0.55% Native American, 0.98% Asian, 0.01% Pacific Islander, 0.79% from some other races and 1.61% from two or more races. Hispanic or Latino people of any race were 2.94% of the population.

=== 2000 census ===
As of the 2000 census, there were 13,278 people, 4,609 households, and 3,811 families residing in the charter township. The population density was 463.62 inhabitants per square mile (179.00/km^{2}). There were 5,042 housing units at an average density of 176.05 per square mile (67.97/km^{2}). The racial makeup of the charter township was 97.15% White, 0.12% African American, 0.35% Native American, 0.56% Asian, 0.01% Pacific Islander, 0.67% from some other races and 1.14% from two or more races. Hispanic or Latino people of any race were 1.90% of the population.

There were 4,609 households, out of which 44.3% had children under the age of 18 living with them, 72.1% were married couples living together, 7.5% had a female householder with no husband present, and 17.3% were non-families. 13.8% of all households were made up of individuals, and 4.4% had someone living alone who was 65 years of age or older. The average household size was 2.87 and the average family size was 3.16.

In the Township the population was spread out, with 30.4% under the age of 18, 6.6% from 18 to 24, 29.8% from 25 to 44, 25.0% from 45 to 64, and 8.2% who were 65 years of age or older. The median age was 36 years. For every 100 females, there were 100.2 males. For every 100 females age 18 and over, there were 96.8 males.

The median income for a household in the Township was $62,380, and the median income for a family was $68,237. Males had a median income of $48,389 versus $28,520 for females. The per capita income for the Township was $25,025. About 1.0% of families and 2.2% of the population were below the poverty line, including 1.2% of those under age 18 and 3.2% of those age 65 or over.

== Major highways ==
- US 31 bisects the Township from north to south, running from Grand Haven to the north and Holland to the south.
- M-45 (Lake Michigan Drive) also bisects the Township from east to west, running east from US 31 to Allendale Charter Township then on to Grand Rapids.

== Sports ==
- Grand Haven Golf Club
