= Battle Point, Antarctica =

Headland on the east coast of Graham Land, Antarctica

Battle Point (67°10′S 64°45′W) is a rocky and conspicuous coastal headland lying just below and southeast of Mount Dater on the east coast of Graham Land, Antarctica. This coastal area was photographed by several American expeditions: United States Antarctic Service, 1939–41; Ronne Antarctic Research Expedition, 1947–48; U.S. Navy photos, 1968. It was mapped by the British Antarctic Survey, 1963–64, and named by the UK Antarctic Place-Names Committee for Walter R.B. Battle (1919–53), British glaciologist who worked on problems of cirque erosion.
