= Ottawa County, Michigan =

County in Michigan, United States

- County
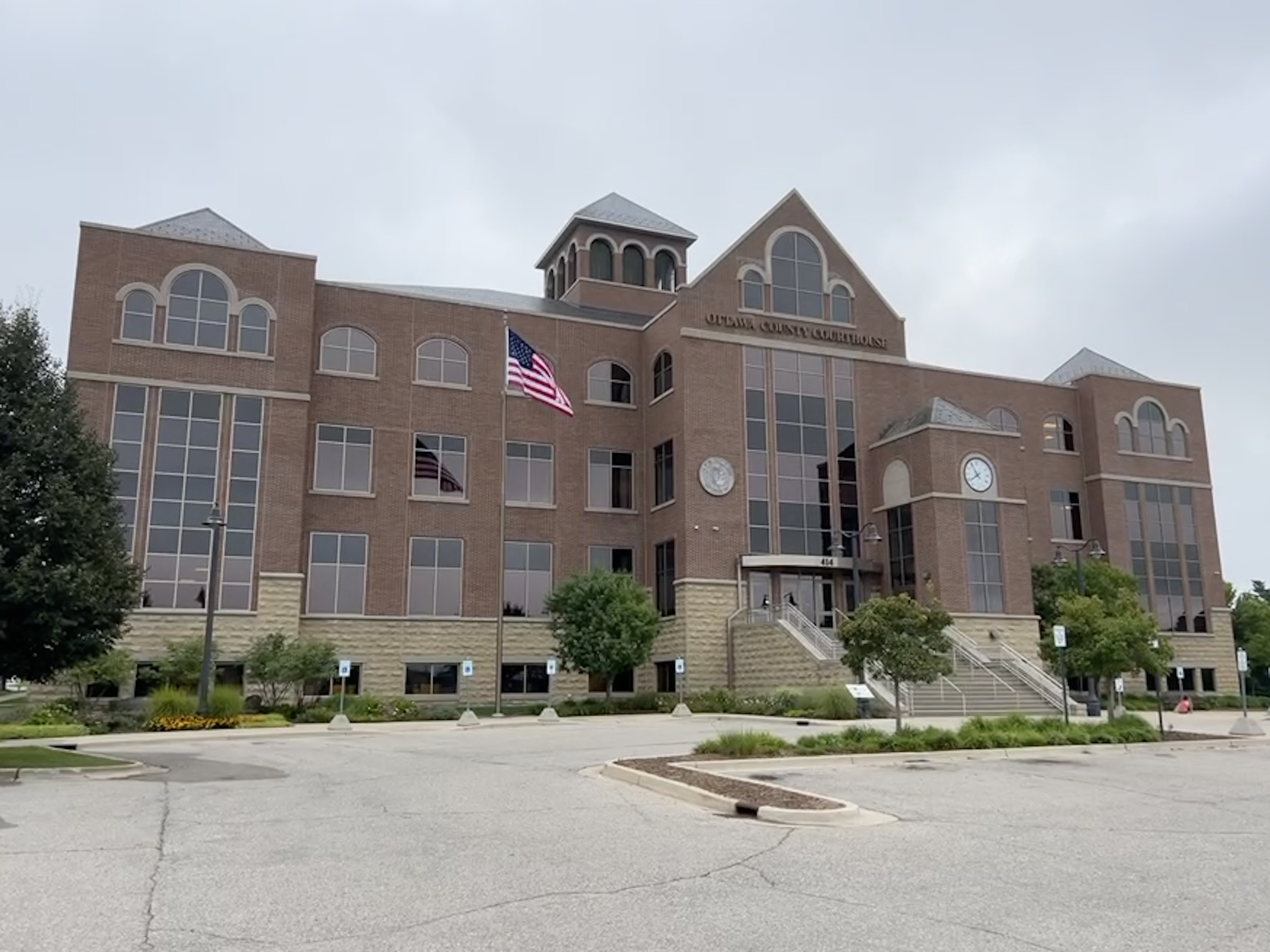
- Ottawa County Courthouse in Grand Haven

- Logo

- Location within the U.S. state of Michigan
- Coordinates: 42°55′N 86°14′W
- Country: United States
- State: Michigan
- Authorized: 1831
- Organized: 1837
- Named for: Ottawa Nation
- Seat: Grand Haven
- Largest city: Holland

Government
  - Administrator: Patrick Waterman

Area
  - Total: 1,631 sq mi (4,220 km^{2})
  - Land: 563 sq mi (1,460 km^{2})
  - Water: 1,068 sq mi (2,770 km^{2}) 65%

Population (2020)
  - Total: 296,200
  - Estimate (2025): 308,459 ▲
  - Density: 526/sq mi (203/km^{2})
- Time zone: UTC−5 (Eastern)
  - Summer (DST): UTC−4 (EDT)
- Area code: 616
- Congressional districts: 3rd, 4th
- Website: miottawa.org

Ottawa County (/ˈɒtəwə/ OT-ə-wə) is a county located in the U.S. state of Michigan. As of the 2020 U.S. Census, the population was 296,200. The county seat is Grand Haven, while the county's largest city is Holland. Ottawa County is included in the Grand Rapids metropolitan area, the second-largest metropolitan area in Michigan. While the county is an "agricultural powerhouse", with area farms producing more than $726 million annually, the county is one of the fastest-growing in Michigan. Additionally, Ottawa County is home to a significant Dutch American population.

Ottawa County, which is named for the Ottawa people, was set off in 1831, and organized in 1837. The county is located in the region of West Michigan, and is located along 24 miles (39 km) of Lake Michigan shoreline. The county is home to Grand Valley State University, a public university in Allendale, and Hope College, a Christian liberal arts college in Holland.

== History ==
Before European settlers arrived, this area was home to the Potawatomi and Ottawa people for centuries. The Grand River was used as a trade route into the interior of Michigan. Much of what is known about the Native American presence in Ottawa County comes from the excavation of archeological artifacts at places like the Battle Point Site.

The city dates its European-American founding to French colonial settlers. A fur trading outpost called Gabagouache was first established by Madeline La Framboise and her husband Joseph.

The first permanent settler of the county was a Presbyterian minister, William Montague Ferry, who settled in Grand Haven in 1834. Grand Haven quickly grew and became an important port for trade and travel. Ferry is often referred to as the "father" of Ottawa County.

Dutch settlers started arriving in the area in 1847, led by Albertus van Raalte. These Dutch Settlers moved into the Holland area. This area was already inhabited by many Odawa (Ottawa) people as well as the Old Wing Mission. Within just a few years, the new Dutch settlers had forced out the Ottawa people and the Old Wing Mission.

== Geography ==
According to the US Census Bureau, the county has a total area of 1,631 square miles (4,220 km^{2}), of which 563 square miles (1,460 km^{2}) is land and 1,068 square miles (2,770 km^{2}) (65%) is water.

Ottawa County is located in West Michigan, a region of the Lower Peninsula along Lake Michigan. Ottawa County itself contains 24 miles (39 km) of shoreline along Lake Michigan. The county is bisected by the Grand River, the longest river in Michigan; the river empties into Lake Michigan at Grand Haven.

=== Bodies of water ===
- Bass River
- Black Lake (partially)
- Grand River
- Lake Macatawa
- Lake Michigan
- Macatawa River
- Pigeon River
- Spring Lake

=== Adjacent counties ===
By land

- Allegan County – south
- Kent County – east
- Muskegon County – north

By water

- Milwaukee County, Wisconsin – northwest
- Racine County, Wisconsin – southwest

=== Major highways ===
- I-96
- I-196
- BL I-196
- US 31
- M-6
- M-11
- M-45
- M-104
- M-121
- M-231
- A-37
- B-31
- B-35
- B-72

== Demographics ==
Historical population
Census	Pop.	Note	%±
1840	208		—
1850	5,587		2,586.1%
1860	13,215		136.5%
1870	26,651		101.7%
1880	33,126		24.3%
1890	35,358		6.7%
1900	39,667		12.2%
1910	45,301		14.2%
1920	47,660		5.2%
1930	54,858		15.1%
1940	59,660		8.8%
1950	73,751		23.6%
1960	98,719		33.9%
1970	128,181		29.8%
1980	157,174		22.6%
1990	187,768		19.5%
2000	238,314		26.9%
2010	263,801		10.7%
2020	296,200		12.3%
2025 (est.)	308,459	▲	4.1%
sources 1840-2022

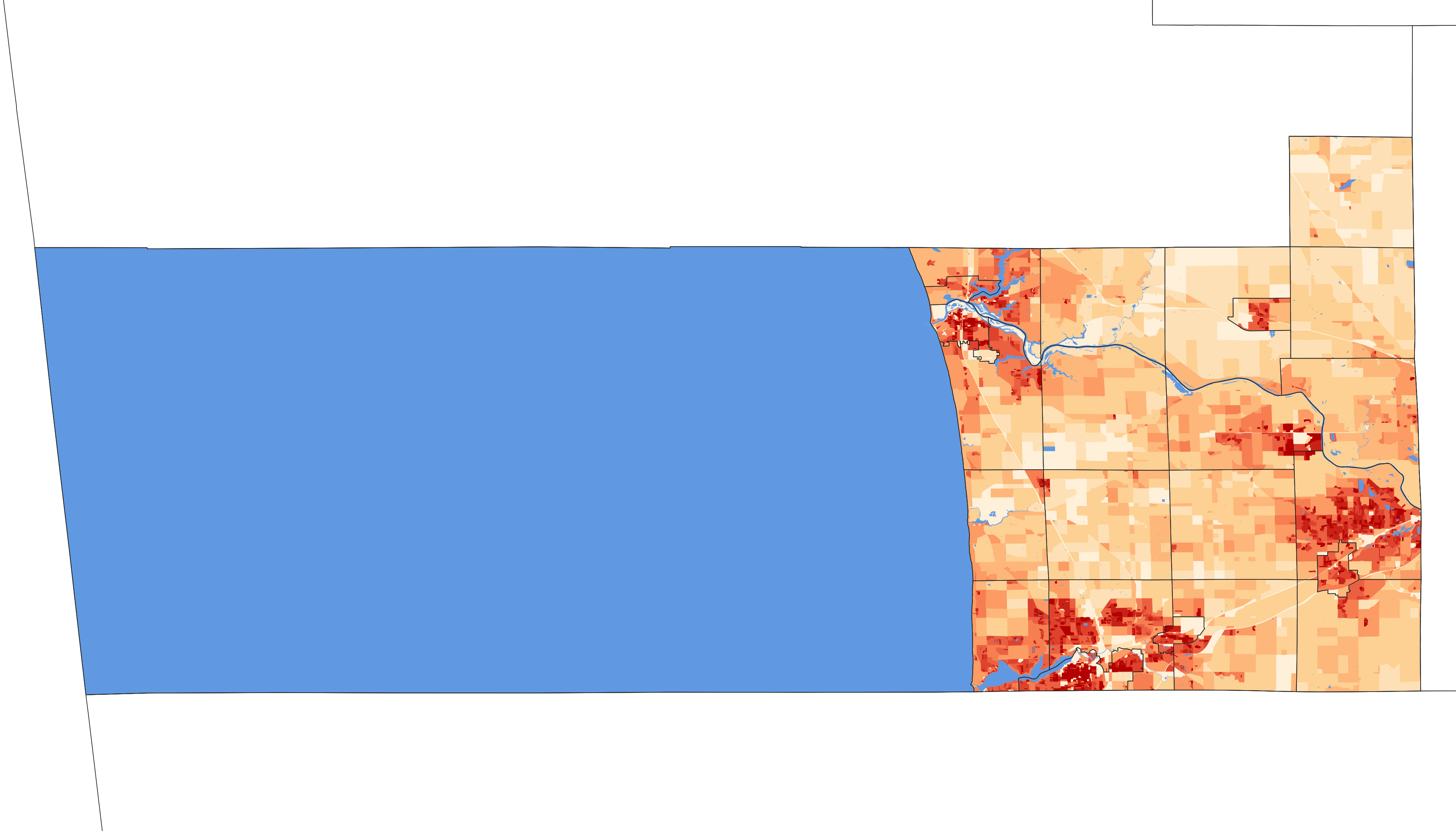
2020 population density of Ottawa County MI by census block

=== Racial and ethnic composition ===
Ottawa County, Michigan – Racial and ethnic composition Note: the US Census treats Hispanic/Latino as an ethnic category. This table excludes Latinos from the racial categories and assigns them to a separate category. Hispanics/Latinos may be of any race.
Race / Ethnicity (NH = Non-Hispanic)	Pop 1980	Pop 1990	Pop 2000	Pop 2010	Pop 2020	% 1980	% 1990	% 2000	% 2010	% 2020
White alone (NH)	150,145	175,857	211,058	226,156	241,520	95.53%	93.66%	88.56%	85.73%	81.54%
Black or African American alone (NH)	627	937	2,380	3,551	5,071	0.40%	0.50%	1.00%	1.35%	1.71%
Native American or Alaska Native alone (NH)	420	577	681	806	726	0.27%	0.31%	0.29%	0.31%	0.25%
Asian alone (NH)	689	2,388	4,940	6,576	7,895	0.44%	1.27%	2.07%	2.49%	2.67%
Native Hawaiian or Pacific Islander alone (NH)	x	x	32	64	95	x	x	0.01%	0.02%	0.03%
Other race alone (NH)	287	62	148	170	851	0.18%	0.03%	0.06%	0.06%	0.29%
Mixed race or Multiracial (NH)	x	x	2,383	3,717	10,660	x	x	1.00%	1.41%	3.60%
Hispanic or Latino (any race)	5,006	7,947	16,692	22,761	29,382	3.19%	4.23%	7.00%	8.63%	9.92%
Total	157,174	187,768	238,314	263,801	296,200	100.00%	100.00%	100.00%	100.00%	100.00%

=== 2020 census ===
As of the 2020 census, the county had a population of 296,200. The median age was 36.1 years. 23.7% of residents were under the age of 18 and 15.9% of residents were 65 years of age or older. For every 100 females there were 95.8 males, and for every 100 females age 18 and over there were 93.2 males age 18 and over.

The racial makeup of the county was 84.0% White, 1.8% Black or African American, 0.5% American Indian and Alaska Native, 2.7% Asian, <0.1% Native Hawaiian and Pacific Islander, 4.0% from some other race, and 6.9% from two or more races. Hispanic or Latino residents of any race comprised 9.9% of the population.

78.8% of residents lived in urban areas, while 21.2% lived in rural areas.

There were 107,239 households in the county, of which 32.0% had children under the age of 18 living in them. Of all households, 58.0% were married-couple households, 15.0% were households with a male householder and no spouse or partner present, and 21.7% were households with a female householder and no spouse or partner present. About 22.6% of all households were made up of individuals and 10.0% had someone living alone who was 65 years of age or older.

There were 114,318 housing units, of which 6.2% were vacant. Among occupied housing units, 77.3% were owner-occupied and 22.7% were renter-occupied. The homeowner vacancy rate was 0.8% and the rental vacancy rate was 6.8%.

=== 2010 census ===
As of the 2010 United States census, there were 263,801 people living in the county. 90.1% were White, 2.6% Asian, 1.5% Black or African American, 0.4% Native American, 3.4% of some other race and 2.0% of two or more races. 8.6% were Hispanic or Latino (of any race). 31.0% were of Dutch, 14.2% German, 5.8% English and 5.7% Irish ancestry.

=== 2000 census ===
As of the 2000 United States census, there were 238,314 people, 81,662 households, and 61,328 families in the county. The population density was 421 inhabitants per square mile (163/km^{2}). There were 86,856 housing units at an average density of 154 per square mile (59/km^{2}). The racial makeup of the county was 91.52% White, 1.05% Black or African American, 0.36% Native American, 2.09% Asian, 0.02% Pacific Islander, 3.48% from other races, and 1.48% from two or more races. 7.00% of the population were Hispanic or Latino of any race. 37.3% reported being of Dutch, 14.6% German, 6.2% English, 5.6% Irish and 5.4% American ancestry, 91.5% spoke only English at home; 5.4% spoke Spanish.

There were 81,662 households, out of which 39.30% had children under the age of 18 living with them, 64.60% were married couples living together, 7.50% had a female householder with no husband present, and 24.90% were non-families. 19.60% of all households were made up of individuals, and 7.40% had someone living alone who was 65 years of age or older. The average household size was 2.81 and the average family size was 3.25.

The county has numerous seasonal residents during the summer. Port Sheldon Township has many lakefront homes and other inland retreats that serve as summer getaways for residents of Grand Rapids, Detroit, and Chicago. No official statistics are compiled on seasonal residents.

In the county, 28.70% of the population was under the age of 18, 11.90% was from 18 to 24, 29.30% from 25 to 44, 20.00% from 45 to 64, and 10.10% was 65 years of age or older. The median age was 32 years. For every 100 females, there were 97.00 males. For every 100 females age 18 and over, there were 94.20 males.

The Robert Wood Johnson Foundation ranks Ottawa County as Michigan's second-healthiest county, preceded only by the leisure-oriented Traverse City area.

The median income for a household in the county was $52,347, and the median income for a family was $59,896. Males had a median income of $42,180 versus $27,706 for females. The per capita income for the county was $21,676. About 3.10% of families and 5.50% of the population were below the poverty line, including 4.70% of those under age 18 and 4.90% of those age 65 or over.

=== Religion ===
- The Catholic Church has 11 churches and 24,700 members.
- The Christian Reformed Church in North America has 67 churches and 33,700 members.
- The Church of Jesus Christ of Latter-day Saints has two meetinghouses in the county.
- The Protestant Reformed Churches have around 10 large congregations in the county.
- The Reformed Church in America has 47 congregations and 33,300 members.

== Government ==
Ottawa County operates the County jail, maintains rural roads, operates the major local courts, records deeds, mortgages, and vital records, administers public health regulations, and participates with the state in the provision of social services. The county board of commissioners controls the budget and has limited authority to make laws or ordinances. In Michigan, most local government functions – police and fire, building and zoning, tax assessment, street maintenance etc. – are the responsibility of individual cities and townships.

Most of the county's offices are located in either the city of Grand Haven or at the Fillmore complex in Olive Township.

=== Elected officials ===
- County Clerk/Register of Deeds – Justin F. Roebuck
- County Commissioners
- County Treasurer – Cheryl Clark
- Prosecuting Attorney – Sarah F. Matwiejczyk
- Sheriff – Eric DeBoer
- Water Resources Commissioner – Joe Bush

(information as of January 2025) Since the late 19th century, the county has been strongly supportive of the Republican Party.

As of 2023, the county's board of commissioners, a majority of whom are members of the advocacy group Ottawa Impact, has been described as "far-right" by national and Michigan-based media organizations. After the 2022 elections in which they took power, the board appointed Trump administration official John Gibbs to serve as the county administrator. In February 2024, the Board of Commissioners voted 10–1 to fire Gibbs for cause.

=== Board of Commissioners ===
11 members, elected from districts (1 Democrat, 10 Republicans)

District	Commissioner	Party	District's Area
1	Jim Barry	Republican	Townships of Port Sheldon, Olive, and Park
2	Jordan Jorritsma	Republican	Townships of Park and Holland Charter
3	Doug Zylstra	Democratic	City of Holland
4	Jacob Bonnema	Republican	City of Zeeland and Townships of Zeeland Charter and Holland Charter
5	Joe Moss	Republican	City of Hudsonville and Townships of Blendon, Jamestown Charter, and Zeeland Charter
6	Kendra Wenzel	Republican	Township of Georgetown Charter
7	John Teeples (chairperson)	Republican	Township of Georgetown Charter
8	Sylvia Rhodea	Republican	Township of Allendale Charter
9	Phil Kuyers	Republican	Townships of Grand Haven Charter, Robinson, and Spring Lake
10	Josh Brugger (Vice-chairperson)	Republican	Cities of Grand Haven and Ferrysburg, Township of Spring Lake
11	Allison Miedema	Republican	City of Coopersville and Townships of Chester, Crockery, Polkton Charter, Tallmadge Charter, and Wright

(information correct as of January 2025)

=== Local policies ===
Beginning in 2012, County Administrator Alan Vanderberg and the Board of Commissioners adopted the "Four Cs" Initiative including "Cultural Intelligence." At that time, Vanderberg asserted that there was discrimination in the county, and that it could adversely affect the future prosperity of the county. The county "rebranded" in 2017, adopting the slogan "Where you belong." Vanderberg said the slogan is intended to let everyone know they are welcome in Ottawa County, regardless of color, ethnic background, sexual identity, religion or other qualifier.

The county board made numerous changes at their first meeting when sworn in on January 3, 2023; the county slogan was changed to "Where Freedom Rings", the Diversity, equity, and inclusion office was dissolved, the head health official was replaced, and a conservative law organization made their main legal representative. The conservative group that promoted the new board members, according to Fox 17, was against the mandated COVID-19 safety measures and cultural diversity policies. Instability surrounding the county board raised concerns about the county's bond credit rating being lowered from its AAA status according to MLive. In May 2023 the county board passed a resolution declared that the county was a "constitutional county."

== Politics ==
United States presidential election results for Ottawa County, Michigan
Year	Republican		Democratic		Third party(ies)	
Year	No.	%	No.	%	No.	%
1884	3,758	53.36%	3,049	43.29%	236	3.35%
1888	4,302	55.03%	3,191	40.82%	325	4.16%
1892	3,643	50.82%	2,996	41.79%	530	7.39%
1896	5,188	58.05%	3,550	39.72%	199	2.23%
1900	5,324	62.21%	3,050	35.64%	184	2.15%
1904	5,908	75.33%	1,553	19.80%	382	4.87%
1908	5,642	66.25%	2,429	28.52%	445	5.23%
1912	1,825	20.87%	2,036	23.28%	4,885	55.85%
1916	5,484	56.19%	3,941	40.38%	335	3.43%
1920	10,528	78.74%	2,391	17.88%	451	3.37%
1924	11,688	78.55%	1,871	12.57%	1,321	8.88%
1928	15,417	85.48%	2,524	14.00%	94	0.52%
1932	12,076	58.34%	7,981	38.56%	643	3.11%
1936	11,114	51.35%	9,579	44.26%	952	4.40%
1940	15,462	62.39%	9,152	36.93%	170	0.69%
1944	17,077	66.23%	8,511	33.01%	198	0.77%
1948	16,028	63.38%	8,789	34.76%	471	1.86%
1952	22,328	72.83%	7,835	25.56%	494	1.61%
1956	28,611	74.90%	9,459	24.76%	130	0.34%
1960	32,678	75.26%	10,617	24.45%	128	0.29%
1964	24,512	54.79%	20,151	45.05%	72	0.16%
1968	33,356	67.60%	12,431	25.19%	3,555	7.20%
1972	42,169	71.99%	15,119	25.81%	1,288	2.20%
1976	49,196	74.12%	16,381	24.68%	793	1.19%
1980	51,217	67.85%	18,435	24.42%	5,832	7.73%
1984	60,142	79.69%	15,000	19.88%	326	0.43%
1988	61,515	76.20%	18,769	23.25%	445	0.55%
1992	56,862	59.10%	22,180	23.05%	17,169	17.85%
1996	61,436	64.39%	27,024	28.32%	6,956	7.29%
2000	78,703	71.16%	29,600	26.76%	2,296	2.08%
2004	92,048	71.55%	35,552	27.64%	1,043	0.81%
2008	83,330	61.03%	50,828	37.23%	2,381	1.74%
2012	88,166	66.41%	42,737	32.19%	1,854	1.40%
2016	88,467	61.50%	44,973	31.26%	10,408	7.24%
2020	100,913	59.81%	64,705	38.35%	3,095	1.83%
2024	106,133	59.46%	69,653	39.02%	2,721	1.52%

United States Senate election results for Ottawa County, Michigan1
Year	Republican		Democratic		Third party(ies)	
Year	No.	%	No.	%	No.	%
2024	105,708	59.69%	67,389	38.05%	3,995	2.26%

Michigan Gubernatorial election results for Ottawa County
Year	Republican		Democratic		Third party(ies)	
Year	No.	%	No.	%	No.	%
2022	85,361	58.29%	58,952	40.26%	2,119	1.45%

Ottawa County has long been the most consistently Republican county in Michigan and one of the most Republican in the country. The last Democratic presidential candidate to carry the county was George B. McClellan in 1864. In 1912, incumbent Republican president William Howard Taft lost the county to "Bull Moose Party" candidate and former Republican President Theodore Roosevelt.

Being part of a local "Bible Belt", the county is very Republican even by the standards of traditionally Republican west Michigan. As a measure of how Republican the county has been since 1864, it has rejected Democratic presidential candidates even in national Democratic landslides. It was one of the few counties where Franklin Roosevelt was shut out in all four of his presidential bids, and was one of only three counties in the state to vote for Barry Goldwater over Lyndon Johnson in 1964. Lyndon Johnson won 45% of the county's vote, the last time a Democrat won at least 40% of the county's vote. In 2008, it was one of the only two counties in Michigan where Barack Obama did not win 40 percent of the county's vote, and his weakest county, being the only one where John McCain received more than 60 percent of the vote, as he won it by 24 points while Obama carried the state by 16.5 points. In 2024, Kamala Harris had the best performance of any Democratic presidential candidate in Ottawa County since 1964, though she still lost the county by 20 points.

For decades, Ottawa County was entirely or mostly part of what is now the 2nd district, which stretched along the Lake Michigan shoreline from northern Allegan County into Northern Michigan from 1993 to 2023. After the 2020 census, however, the 2nd lost all but the county's northernmost tip, around Chester Township. The southern two-thirds of the county, including Holland and Zeeland, was merged with the Kalamazoo-based 4th district (formerly the 6th district). The 2nd's five-term incumbent, Republican Bill Huizenga, transferred to the 4th, while fellow Republican John Moolenaar transferred to the 2nd after his Midland-based district was dismantled. The northern third of the county, including Grand Haven and Allendale, was drawn into the Grand Rapids-based 3rd district, which is now represented by Hillary Scholten, the first Democrat to represent a significant part of the county in decades.

The county's Republican bent is not restricted to federal elections. It frequently rejects Democrats at the state level as well. Underscoring this, during the 1986 gubernatorial election, it was the only county not to back James Blanchard for a second term. In recent years, Grand Haven and Holland have been the only areas where Democrats have done well. Grand Haven has gone Democratic in every election since 2008, while Holland has gone Democratic all but once since then. It is also one of the few counties in Michigan that have swung leftward since 2016. Despite this, the county remains very Republican downballot. Underscoring this, all five state representatives representing the county are Republicans, as are both state senators representing the county. In much of the county's portion of the 3rd, Scholten is the only elected Democrat above the municipal level.

During the COVID-19 pandemic in Michigan, county officials and their families faced death threats following the introduction of mask mandates at public schools, with conservative groups influencing the 2022 Michigan elections to "preserve local heritage". A new county government that some described as holding Christian nationalist values was subsequently elected in the 2022 elections.

Perhaps the most prominent politician in Ottawa County History was Grand Haven's Thomas W. Ferry. Thomas Ferry served as an Ottawa County Clerk at age 21. He went on to become a member of the Michigan House of Representatives, the Michigan Senate, the U.S. House of Representatives and the U.S. Senate. While in the U.S. Senate, he served as President Pro Tempore (during the 44th and 45th congresses). As Pro Tempore, he became, upon the death of Vice President Henry Wilson on November 22, 1875, next in the line of presidential succession, and remained so until March 4, 1877.

== Communities ==
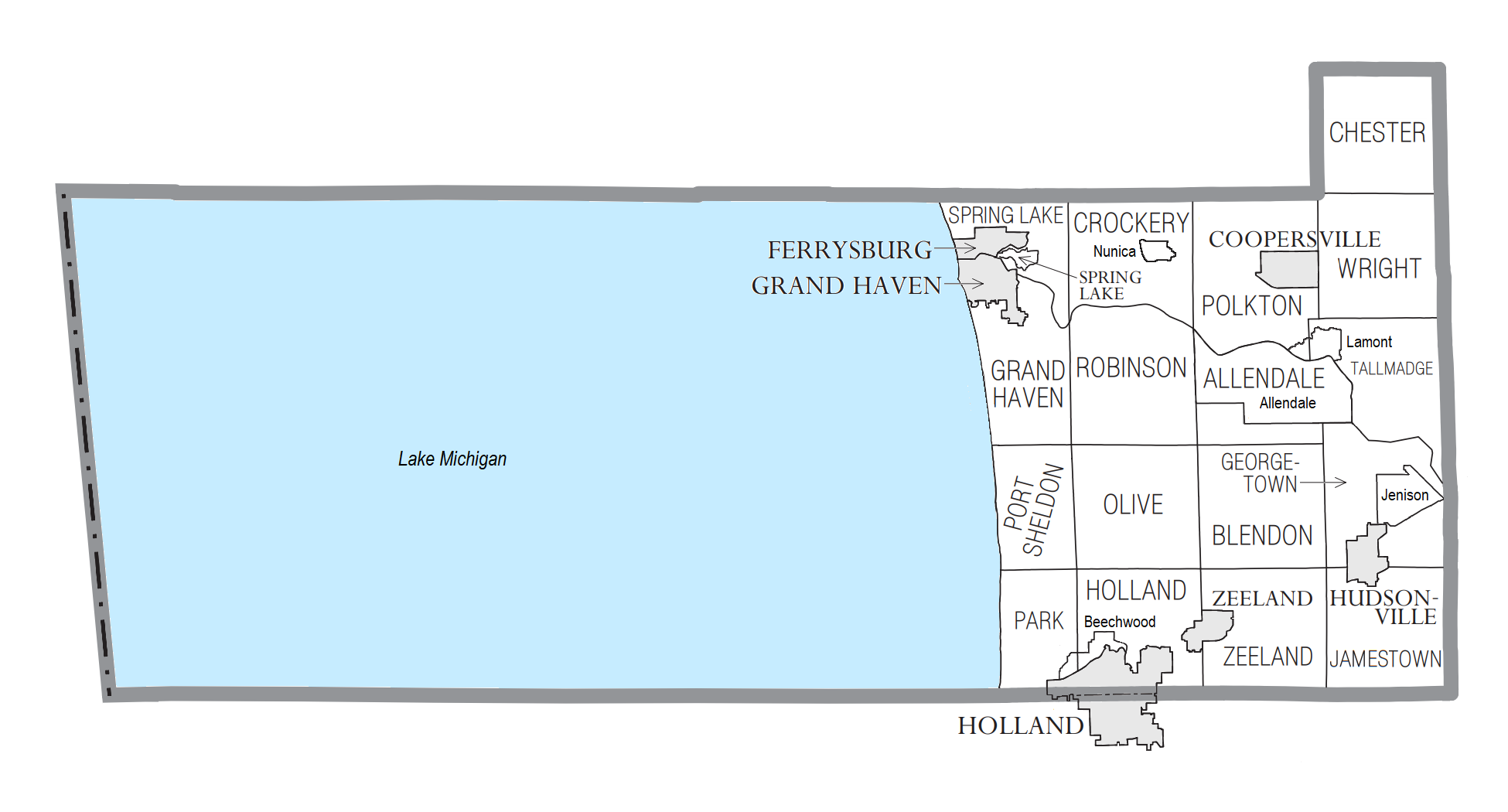
U.S. Census data map showing local municipal boundaries within Ottawa County, as well as CDP boundaries. Shaded areas represent incorporated cities.

=== Cities ===
- Coopersville
- Ferrysburg
- Grand Haven (county seat)
- Holland (partial)
- Hudsonville
- Zeeland

=== Village ===
- Spring Lake

=== Charter townships ===
- Allendale Charter Township
- Georgetown Charter Township
- Grand Haven Charter Township
- Holland Charter Township
- Jamestown Charter Township
- Polkton Charter Township
- Tallmadge Charter Township
- Zeeland Charter Township

=== Civil townships ===
- Blendon Township
- Chester Township
- Crockery Township
- Olive Township
- Park Township
- Port Sheldon Township
- Robinson Township
- Spring Lake Township
- Wright Township

=== Census-designated places ===
- Allendale
- Beechwood
- Jenison
- Lamont
- Nunica

=== Other unincorporated communities ===
- Agnew
- Bauer
- Beaverdam
- Borculo
- Clark Corners
- Conklin
- Crisp
- Dennison
- Drenthe
- Eastmanville
- Forest Grove
- Forest Grove Station
- Gitchel
- Grand Valley
- Harlem
- Harrisburg
- Herrington
- Jamestown
- Macatawa (partial)
- Marne
- New Holland
- Noordeloos
- North Blendon
- Oaklawn Beechwood
- Olive Center
- Ottawa Center
- Pearline
- Pine Creek
- Port Sheldon
- Reno
- Robinson
- Rosy Mound
- Rusk
- Snug Harbor
- South Blendon
- Tallmadge
- Tasmas Corners
- Virginia Park
- Vriesland
- Waverly
- West Olive
- Wright
- Zutphen

== Education ==
School districts include:

- Allendale Public School District
- Coopersville Public School District
- Fruitport Community Schools
- Grand Haven Area Public Schools
- Grandville Public Schools
- Holland City School District
- Hudsonville Public School District
- Jenison Public Schools
- Kenowa Hills Public Schools
- Kent City Community Schools
- Ravenna Public Schools
- Sparta Area Schools
- Spring Lake Public Schools
- West Ottawa Public School District
- Zeeland Public Schools

== See also ==
- List of Michigan State Historic Sites in Ottawa County
- National Register of Historic Places listings in Ottawa County, Michigan
