= Robinson Township, Michigan =

- Civil township
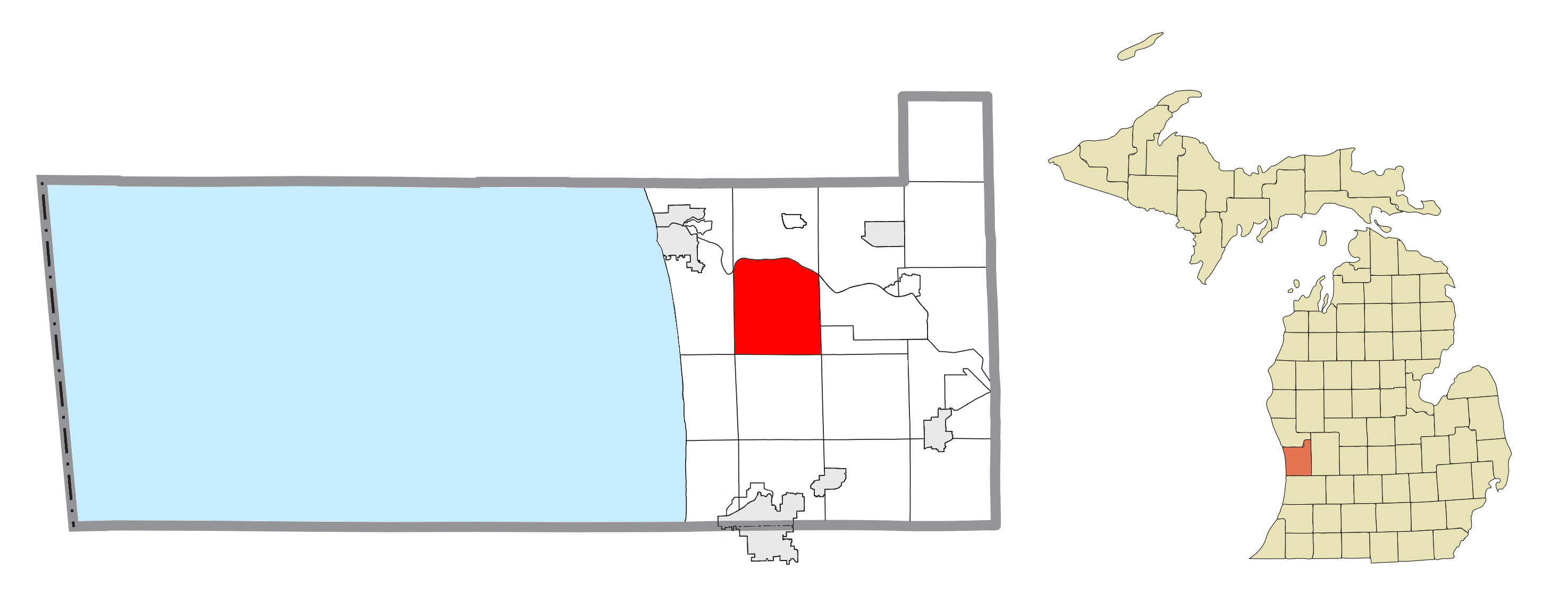
- Location within Ottawa County

- Location within the state of Michigan Location within the United States
- Coordinates: 42°59′37″N 86°05′07″W
- Country: United States
- State: Michigan
- County: Ottawa
- Established: 1856

Government
  - Supervisor: Frank Johnson
  - Clerk: Christine Saddler

Area
  - Total: 39.53 sq mi (102.38 km^{2})
  - Land: 38.47 sq mi (99.64 km^{2})
  - Water: 1.06 sq mi (2.75 km^{2})
- Elevation: 620 ft (189 m)

Population (2020)
  - Total: 6,382
  - Density: 165.9/sq mi (64.1/km^{2})
- Time zone: UTC-5 (Eastern (EST))
  - Summer (DST): UTC-4 (EDT)
- ZIP code(s): 49417 (Grand Haven); 49460 (West Olive); 49464 (Zeeland)
- Area code: 616
- FIPS code: 26-69000
- GNIS feature ID: 1626988
- Website: Official website

Robinson Township is a civil township of Ottawa County in the U.S. state of Michigan. The population was 6,382 at the 2020 census.

== Communities ==
There are no incorporated municipalities in the township.

- Robinson is an unincorporated community near the center of the township at 42°59′12″N 86°05′03″W.
- The city of Grand Haven is to the west, and the Grand Haven ZIP code 49417 also serves most of Robinson Township.
- West Olive is to the south, and the West Olive ZIP code 49460 serves areas in the southern part of Robinson Township.

== Geography ==
According to the United States Census Bureau, the township has a total area of 39.5 square miles (102 km^{2}), of which 38.6 square miles (100 km^{2}) is land and 0.8 square miles (2.1 km^{2}) (2.10%) is water.

== Demographics ==
As of the census of 2000, there were 5,588 people, 1,805 households, and 1,505 families residing in the township. The population density was 144.7 inhabitants per square mile (55.9/km^{2}). There were 1,885 housing units at an average density of 48.8 per square mile (18.8/km^{2}). The racial makeup of the township was 93.63% White, 0.30% African American, 0.47% Native American, 0.73% Asian, 0.07% Pacific Islander, 3.31% from other races, and 1.49% from two or more races. Hispanic or Latino of any race were 6.14% of the population.

There were 1,805 households, out of which 44.9% had children under the age of 18 living with them, 75.0% were married couples living together, 5.2% had a female householder with no husband present, and 16.6% were non-families. 12.6% of all households were made up of individuals, and 2.9% had someone living alone who was 65 years of age or older. The average household size was 3.01 and the average family size was 3.29.

In the township the population was spread out, with 31.0% under the age of 18, 7.2% from 18 to 24, 36.3% from 25 to 44, 20.1% from 45 to 64, and 5.4% who were 65 years of age or older. The median age was 33 years. For every 100 females, there were 109.2 males. For every 100 females age 18 and over, there were 107.8 males.

The median income for a household in the township was $57,110, and the median income for a family was $59,067. Males had a median income of $38,676 versus $27,199 for females. The per capita income for the township was $19,603. About 1.5% of families and 4.2% of the population were below the poverty line, including 0.5% of those under age 18 and none of those age 65 or over.
