= Grand River (Michigan) =

Tributary of Lake Michigan in southern Michigan

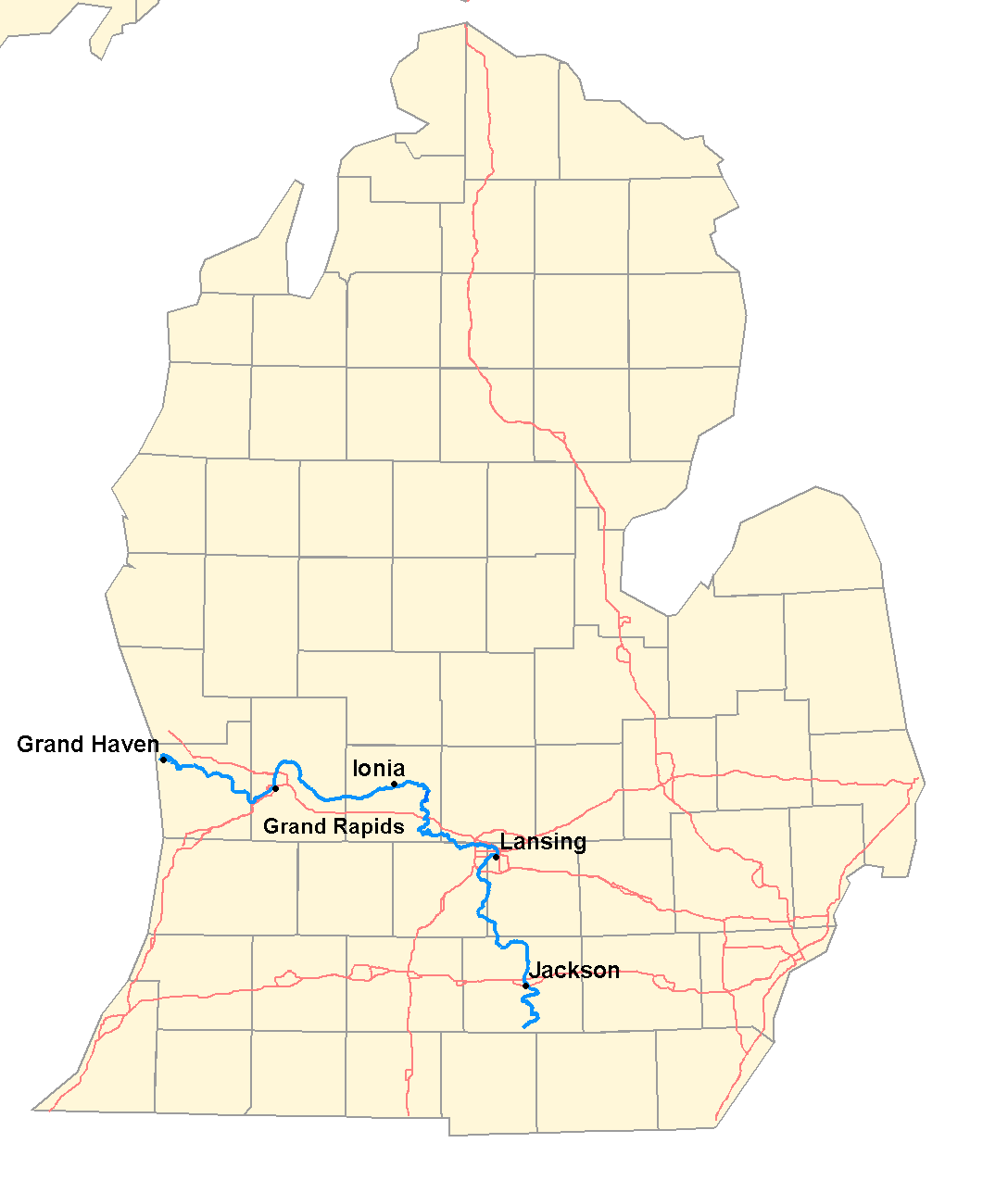
- A map of the Grand River

Physical characteristics
- Source
  - location: Somerset Township, Hillsdale County, Michigan
  - coordinates: 42°05′12″N 84°25′21″W
- Mouth
  - location: Grand Haven, Michigan
  - coordinates: 43°03′30″N 86°15′03″W
- Length: 252 mi (406 km)
- Basin size: 5,572sq.mi.
- Discharge
  - location: mouth
  - average: 5,048.87 cu ft/s (142.968 m^{3}/s) (estimate)

The Grand River (Ottawa: owashtanong, "Far-Flowing Water") is a 252-mile-long (406 km) river in the Lower Peninsula of the U.S. state of Michigan. The longest river in Michigan, the Grand River rises in Hillsdale County, and flows in a generally northwesterly direction to its mouth at Lake Michigan in the city of Grand Haven. The river flows through a number of cities, including Jackson, Lansing, Ionia, and Grand Rapids.

The river was famous for its mile-long, 300-yard-wide, and 10-to-15-foot-tall rapids, for which the city of Grand Rapids was named. These rapids were submerged following the construction of numerous dams, starting in 1835, and flooding of areas behind the dams. The river has not had any rapids for nearly a century.

== Course ==
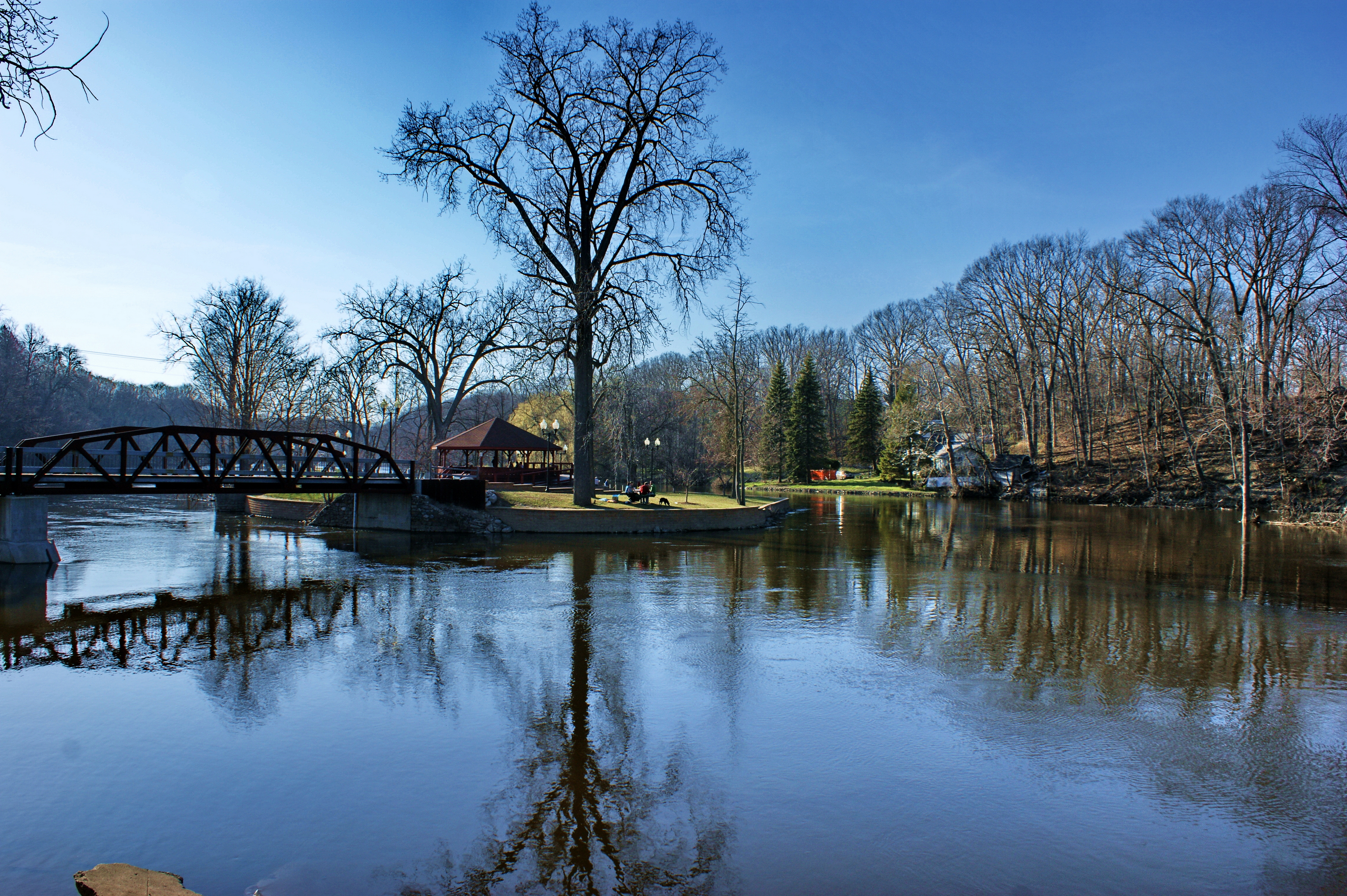
Island Park on the Grand River at Grand Ledge

The headwaters of the Grand River begin from natural springs in Somerset Township in Hillsdale County near the boundary with Liberty Township in Jackson County. From there, the river flows through Jackson, Ingham, Eaton, Clinton, Ionia, Kent, and Ottawa counties before emptying into Lake Michigan. The river runs through the cities of Jackson, Eaton Rapids, Dimondale, Lansing, Grand Ledge, Portland, Ionia, Lowell, Grand Rapids, and Grand Haven.

== Hydrology ==
The Grand River is a major tributary of Lake Michigan. It falls in elevation from 1260 ft. in the highlands of its headwaters to 577 ft. at its mouth on Lake Michigan. Its waters drain northward through the lake, then south and east through the Great Lakes waterways into the St. Lawrence River, which flows northeasterly into the Gulf of St. Lawrence on the Atlantic Ocean. The Grand River discharges an estimated average 5,049 cubic feet per second (143.0 m^{3}/s).

Its watershed is the second-largest in the state, draining an area of 5,572 square miles (14,430 km^{2}), including 18 counties and 158 townships. Much of the basin is flat, and it contains many swamps and lakes. The basin is composed of four sub-basins: Upper Grand, Lower Grand, Thornapple, and Maple, where the four major tributaries flow: the Flat, Rogue, Thornapple, and Maple rivers.

Tributaries of the river include (beginning near river source and travelling downstream): Portage River, Red Cedar River, Looking Glass River, Maple River, Prairie Creek, Bellamy Creek, Flat River, Thornapple River, Rogue River, Coldbrook Creek, Plaster Creek, Bass River, Buck Creek and Crockery Creek.

=== Dams ===
There are fourteen dams on the main branch of the Grand River. Some 218 dams were built on its tributaries; these have divided the ecosystem into a set of dysfunctional local streams. 228 of these dams are registered with the Michigan Department of Environmental Quality.

The main branch dams are:

Lower

- Grand River (6th Street)
- Grand River

Middle

- Lyons (removed in 2016)
- Grand Ledge
- Portland
- North Lansing
- Moores Park
- Webber (hydroelectric)

Upper

- State Street
- Moore's Park (hydroelectric)
- Sanitation
- Smithville (hydroelectric)

Headwaters

- Liberty Mills
- Crystal Lake
- Mirror Lake
- Lake LeAnn North
- Lake LeAnn South

== Ecology ==
The river is a trout and salmon stream for much of its length, also being a location that Lake Sturgeon travel up to lay their eggs. Many different species of fish populate the Grand River, including trout, salmon, sturgeon, steelhead, walleye, smallmouth bass, catfish, and northern pike. All of these species can be fished at different times of year.

== History ==
As the glacial ice receded from what is the central Lower Peninsula of Michigan around 11,000 years ago, the Maple River and lower Grand River served as a drainage channel for the meltwater from a glacial stage of Lake Erie and Lake Huron. The channel ran east to west, emptying into proglacial Lake Chicago, the ancestor of Lake Michigan. During this period, the upper Grand River was a separate tributary to the Maple River-lower Grand River system. As the developing Great Lakes found lower outlets and began to drain east and lower the level of these lakes, the Maple River contributed less and less of the upper Grand River's flow until the former upper Grand River became the lower river's primary source.

About 2,000 years ago, the Hopewell Indians settled along the Grand River near present-day Grandville. Their presence is still seen in the preserved burial mounds.

By the late 17th century, the Grand River band of Odawa had established villages on the banks of the Grand River at the sites of what would later become several towns and cities, including Grand Rapids, Forest Hills, Lowell, Lyons, and Portland. For these peoples, as well as for later explorers, fur traders and settlers, the river served as an important navigational trade route and cultural hub.

The river formed part of a major demarcation of land ceded by Native Americans enabling U.S. settlers to legally obtain title to land in the area. In the 1821 Treaty of Chicago, the Odawa, Ojibwe, and Potawatomi ceded to the United States all lands in Michigan Territory south of the Grand River, with the exception of several small reservations.

The city of Grand Rapids was built starting in 1826 on the site of a mile long rapids 40 miles upstream from the river's mouth, although these disappeared after the installation of a run-of-river dam in 1866 and five low-rise dams during a river beautification project in 1927.

The Grand was important to the rapid development of West-Central Michigan during the 1850s to 1880s, as logs from Michigan's rich pine and oak forests floated down the Grand River for milling. After the Civil War, many soldiers found jobs as lumberjacks cutting logs and guiding them down the river with pike poles, peaveys, and cant hooks. The men wore bright red flannel, felt clothes, and spiked boots to hold them onto the floating logs; these boots chewed up the wooden sidewalks and flooring of the local bars, leading one hotel owner to supply carpet slippers to all river drivers who entered his hotel. The "jacks" earned $1 to $3 per day and all the "vittles" they could eat, which was usually a considerable amount.

In 1883, heavy rains during June and July brought water levels on the river to record highs. The flooding was bad enough, but the rising water overwhelmed lumbering booms—river enclosures used to sort and organize logs for transport to saw mills—in Lowell, Grand Rapids as well as Grand Haven and Robinson townships. As water rose, the logs escaped the enclosures, much like cattle fleeing stockyards. Soon, Kent and Ottawa counties had a 'stampede', as millions of logs flowed uncontrolled down the river and became trapped in bends or against bridges. The result was a logjam of incredible proportions that clogged the river for 47 miles (10 million Feet of logs trapped in Lowell, 95 million Feet of logs trapped in the "Big Bend" northeast of Grand Rapids, 80 million Feet of logs trapped in Ottawa County).

Grand River Avenue (or Grand River Road) was built early in the settlement of Michigan and ran from the head of navigation on the Grand to downtown Detroit. It formed an important part of an early route between Chicago and Detroit, along with the Grand itself, from Grand Rapids to Grand Haven on Lake Michigan.

A fish ladder installed in 1974 replaced the West Side Water Power Canal headgates removed in 1960. In recent years, Grand Rapids Whitewater, a private nonprofit organization, is working toward restoring the rapids to the river in Grand Rapids. The project, which began in 2019, will remove five dams between Sixth street and Pearl street to restore an 18-foot drop in the Grand River's elevation.

== Points of interest ==
Two of Grand Valley State University's campuses are located on the banks of the Grand River. The main campus in Allendale and the Pew Grand Rapids campus in Grand Rapids both border the river in separate locations miles from each other. The Grand is home to GVSU's rowing team, and the crew boathouse sits parallel to the river on the Allendale campus's north side.

Coast Guard Station Grand Haven is situated near the mouth of the river in Grand Haven. The station gives Grand Haven its nickname Coast Guard City USA.

=== Parks, docks and recreational facilities ===
- Millennium Park (Grand Rapids), the largest park in western Michigan, larger than Central Park, NY

== Crossings ==
At least 80 bridges cross the river's 250-mile span, with most bridge structures clustered in metropolitan/municipal areas along the river. County road and state highway crossings can be found in less densely populated areas along the waterway:

List of Bridge Crossings
Route	Type	City	County	Location
US 31	US Route	Grand Haven	Ottawa	43°4′30.98″N 86°13′4.74″W
M-231	Michigan Highway		Ottawa	43°2′24.36″N 86°5′30.83″W
68th Avenue	County Road		Ottawa	43°0′55.27″N 85°57′20.09″W
M-45 (Lake Michigan Dr)	Michigan Highway	Allendale	Ottawa	42°58′19.60″N 85°52′36.22″W
M-11 (Wilson Avenue SW)	Michigan Highway	Grandville	Kent	42°54′54.34″N 85°46′1.11″W
Kent Trails Grand River Bridge Trail	Pedestrian Bridge	Wyoming	Kent	42°54′56.15″N 85°43′22.0″W
I-196	Interstate Highway		Kent	42°56′50.88″N 85°42′39.27″W
Wealthy Street SW	City Street	Grand Rapids	Kent	42°57′21.99″N 85°40′56.37″W
US 131	US Route	Grand Rapids	Kent	42°57′42.29″N 85°40′39.34″W
Fulton Street West	City Street	Grand Rapids	Kent	
The Blue Bridge	Pedestrian Bridge	Grand Rapids	Kent	42°57′52.60″N 85°40′31.30″W
Pearl Street NW	City Street	Grand Rapids	Kent	
Gillett Bridge	Pedestrian Bridge	Grand Rapids	Kent	42°58′03.20″N 85°40′30.70″W
Bridge Street NW	City Street	Grand Rapids	Kent	
I-196	Interstate Highway	Grand Rapids	Kent	
6th Street NW	City Street	Grand Rapids	Kent	
Leonard Street NW	City Street	Grand Rapids	Kent	42°59′5.06″N 85°40′22.35″W
Ann Street NW	City Street		Kent	
I-96	Interstate Highway		Kent	
North Park Street NE	City Street		Kent	
Jupiter Avenue NE	City Street		Kent	
M-44 (Northland Drive NE)	City Street		Kent	
Knapp Street	County Road		Kent	43°0′20.78″N 85°32′33.39″W
M-21 (Fulton Street)	Michigan Highway		Kent	42°57′19.31″N 85°28′31.36″W
Segwun Avenue	City Street	Lowell	42°55′30.67″N 85°20′34.47″W	
South Division Street	City Street	Lowell	42°55′46.33″N 85°19′53.72″W	
North Bridge Street	City Street	Saranac	Ionia	42°55′58.50″N 85°12′48.13″W
Fred Meijer Grand River Valley Trail	Pedestrian Bridge	Ionia	Ionia	
M-66	Michigan Highway	Ionia	Ionia	
Cleveland Street	City Street	Ionia	Ionia	
West Bridge Street	City Street	Lyons	Ionia	42°58′55.04″N 84°57′0.08″W
David Hwy	County Road		Ionia	
West Grand River Avenue	City Street	Portland	Ionia	42°52′14.69″N 84°54′10.89″W
West Bridge Street	City Street	Portland	Ionia	42°52′11.03″N 84°54′14.71″W
I-96	Interstate Highway	Portland	Ionia	42°51′38.80″N 84°55′2.49″W
Kent Street	City Street	Portland	Ionia	42°51′24.59″N 84°54′43.95″W
Charlotte Highway	County Road		Ionia	42°48′55.46″N 84°53′39.74″W
Jones Road	County Road		Clinton	
West State Road	County Road		Clinton	
Bridge St	City Street	Grand Ledge	Eaton	42°45′17.07″N 84°44′37.61″W
I-96/ I-69	Interstate Highway		Eaton	
Webster Road	City Street		Eaton	
South Waverly Road	City Street	Lansing	Ingham	
Martin Luther King Jr. Blvd	City Street	Lansing	Ingham	
North Grand River Avenue	City Street	Lansing	Ingham	
East Cesar E. Chavez Avenue	City Street	Lansing	Ingham	
East Oakland Avenue	City Street	Lansing	Ingham	42°44′36.2688″N 84°33′0.6078″W
East Saginaw Highway	City Street	Lansing	Ingham	42°44′27.02″N 84°32′57.88″W
Lansing Riverwalk Grand River Railroad Bridge	City Street	Lansing	Ingham	
East Shiawassee Street	City Street	Lansing	Ingham	
East Michigan Avenue	City Street	Lansing	Ingham	42°44′0.9024″N 84°32′59.0706″W
East Kalamazoo Street	City Street	Lansing	Ingham	42°43′47.69″N 84°32′50.91″W
I-496	Interstate Highway	Lansing	Ingham	42°43′32.38″N 84°32′44.84″W
South Washington Street	City Street	Lansing	Ingham	
Lansing River Trail	Pedestrian Bridge	Lansing	Ingham	
West Elm Street	City Street	Lansing	Ingham	
M-99 (Northbound)	Michigan Highway	Lansing	Ingham	42°43′11.69″N 84°34′2.36″W
M-99 (Southbound)	Michigan Highway	Lansing	Ingham	
Island Avenue	City Street	Lansing	Ingham	
Lansing River Trail	Pedestrian Bridge	Lansing	Ingham	
Martin Luther King Jr. Boulevard NB	City Street	Lansing	Ingham	42°43′11.75″N 84°34′2.42″W
Martin Luther King Jr. Boulevard SB	City Street	Lansing	Ingham	42°43′12.95″N 84°34′7.22″W
South Waverly Road	City Street		Eaton	42°42′33.50″N 84°36′11.01″W
South Creyts Road	City Street		Eaton	42°40′15.36″N 84°38′32.15″W
I-96	Interstate Highway		Eaton	
South Bridge Street	City Street	Dimondale	Eaton	42°38′41.02″N 84°39′0.96″W
M-99 (Southbound)	Michigan Highway		Eaton	42°37′52.19″N 84°37′22.96″W
M-99 (Northbound)	Michigan Highway		Eaton	
North Waverly Road	County Road		Eaton	
West Columbia Road	County Road		Eaton	42°34′55.79″N 84°36′4.85″W
Bunker Highway	County Road		Eaton	42°33′10.88″N 84°37′19.05″W
Petrieville Highway	County Road		Eaton	42°32′8.12″N 84°37′26.00″W
East Knight Street	City Street	Eaton Rapids	Eaton	42°30′45.95″N 84°39′14.29″W
State Street	City Street	Eaton Rapids	Eaton	42°30′33.45″N 84°39′17.94″W
Smithville Road	County Road		Eaton	
South Waverly Road	County Road		Eaton	42°29′20.05″N 84°36′3.85″W
Gale Road	County Road		Ingham	42°28′52.01″N 84°34′50.44″W
Kinneville Road	County Road		Ingham	42°27′56.44″N 84°34′5.74″W
South Onondaga Road	County Road		Ingham	42°26′42.76″N 84°33′37.77″W
Old Plank Road	County Road		Jackson	42°26′31.08″N 84°33′27.59″W
Tompkins Road	County Road		Jackson	42°23′27.41″N 84°32′29.81″W
Rives Eaton Road	County Road		Jackson	42°24′13.57″N 84°29′8.82″W
Jackson and Lansing Railroad	Railroad		Jackson	42°24′15.43″N 84°26′57.62″W
Churchill Road	County Road		Jackson	
US 127	US Route		Jackson	42°24′8.7″N 84°25′45.17″W
Lansing Avenue	County Road		Jackson	42°23′45.24″N 84°24′49.63″W
Berry Road	County Road		Jackson	
Maplegrove Road	County Road		Jackson	
Parnall Avenue	County Road		Jackson	
I-94	Interstate Highway		Jackson	42°16′18.09″N 84°24′31.36″W
Monroe Street	City Street	Jackson	Jackson	
North Street	City Street	Jackson	Jackson	
Ganson Street	City Street	Jackson	Jackson	
Pearl Street	City Street	Jackson	Jackson	
Morrell Street	City Street	Jackson	Jackson	

Convergence of the Grand and Red Cedar Rivers in downtown Lansing

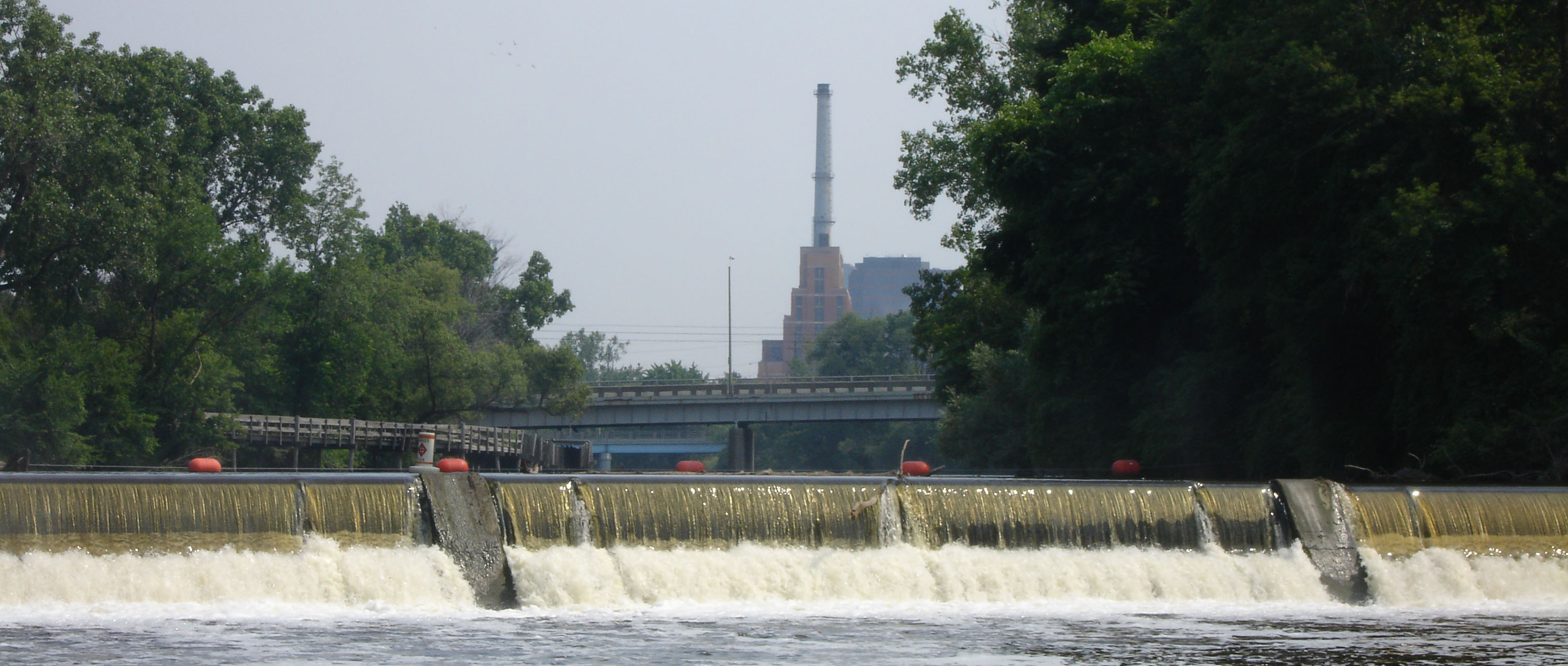
The Grand River's North Lansing dam, near downtown Lansing

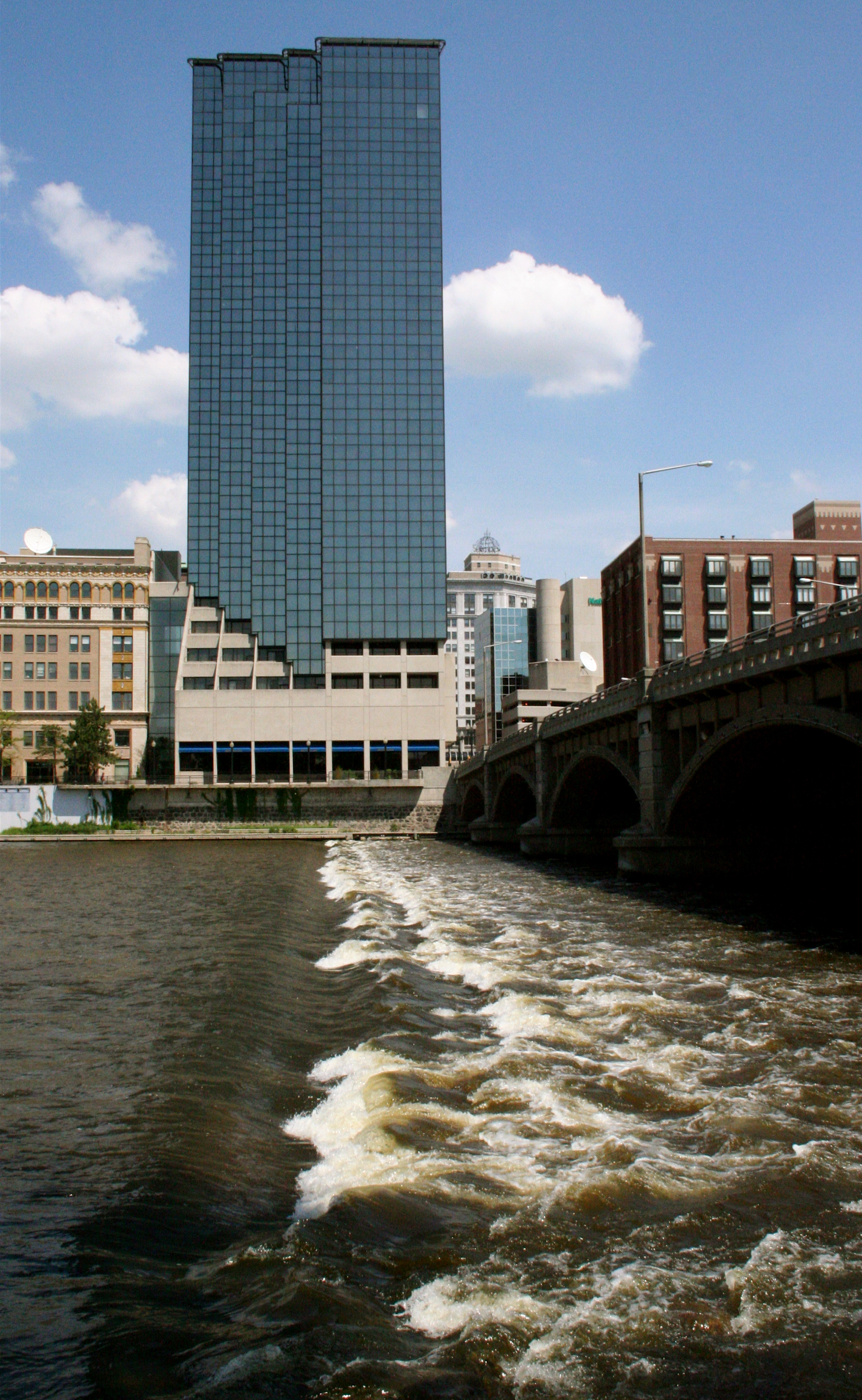
The Grand River through downtown Grand Rapids

The Grand River Watershed

== See also ==
- List of Michigan rivers
- U.S. Route 16 in Michigan, whose original roadbed between Detroit and Grand Haven is known as Grand River Road, or Grand River Avenue in communities along the route
