= Spring Lake Public Schools =

School district in Michigan

Address
- 345 Hammond Street Spring Lake, Ottawa, Michigan, 49456; United States

District information
- Grades: Pre-Kindergarten-12
- Superintendent: Dennis Furton
- Schools: 6
- Budget: $41,904,000 2022-2023 expenditures
- NCES District ID: 2632550

Students and staff
- Students: 2,275 (2024-2025)
- Teachers: 143.43 (on an FTE basis) (2024-2025)
- Staff: 316.93 FTE (2024-2025)
- Student–teacher ratio: 15.86 (2024-2025)

Other information
- Website: www.springlakeschools.org

Spring Lake Public Schools is a public school district headquartered in Spring Lake, Michigan. It serves the village of Spring Lake and most of Spring Lake Township (except for a portion in the north zoned to Grand Haven Area Public Schools and a portion in the east zoned to Fruitport Community Schools) and parts of Crockery Township in Ottawa County.

== History ==
The first school in Spring Lake was built in 1844. Known as Barber Street School, it remained in service until 1855, when a new school was built, and it was moved and put to other uses. In 1988, it was moved to the southwest corner of West Exchange Street and South Buchanan Street and renovated for community use.

A union school district was established in 1867, and a Union School was built in 1869. On May 11, 1893, half of Spring Lake village was destroyed in a fire, including the Union School. It was rebuilt and reopened in 1894. It was located across Exchange Street from the current site of Barber Street School.

In 1951, Holmes Elementary was built. The Jeffers school district and its three-room school, Jeffers Elementary, was annexed by Spring Lake district in 1957. By 1969, the district had built several additions to Jeffers Elementary.

As of 1957, the Union School was still in use as a junior high school. An article in the Grand Haven Tribune called it a "‘horse and buggy’ building which was built in 1893 and enlarged in 1919. In case of fire the youngsters on the upper floor must slide down the ‘chute.’ [A fire escape slide attached to the outside of the building.] … Lighting, ventilation, and other structural problems are not easy to solve …"

In November 1957, voters passed a bond issue to build a new junior high school at 345 Hammond Street. It was dedicated on November 30, 1959. By 1961, the community was debating establishing a high school of its own instead of sending its high school students to Grand Haven High School.

In fall 1963, additions to house a high school were completed at the junior high school. Ninth and tenth grade were added that year, and by 1965, the high school went to grade twelve.

The current high school was dedicated on June 15, 2000 and opened in fall 2000. The architecture firm Fanning/Howey Inc. designed the building. The former junior/senior high school building became the district's middle school and intermediate school.

Substantial reconstruction of Jeffers and Holmes Elementaries was completed in fall 2016.

== Schools ==
Schools in Spring Lake Public Schools district
School	Address	Notes
Spring Lake High School	16140 148th Ave., Spring Lake	Grades 9-12. Built 2000.
Spring Lake Middle School	345 Hammond St., Spring Lake	Grades 7-8. Shares a building with Spring Lake Intermediate School. Built 1959.
Spring Lake Intermediate School	345 Hammond St., Spring Lake	Grades 5-6. Shares a building with Spring Lake Middle School.
Holmes Elementary	426 River St., Spring Lake	Grades PreK-4. Built 1951.
Jeffers Elementary	16031 144th Ave., Spring Lake	Grades PreK-4
