= Spring Lake High School =

High school in Spring Lake, Ottawa County, Michigan

Location
- 16140 148th Avenue; Spring Lake, Michigan 49456; United States; 43.0625°N 86.1522°W

Information
- Type: Public
- School district: Spring Lake Public Schools
- Superintendent: Dennis Furton
- Principal: Ben Armey
- Teaching staff: 38.60 (FTE)
- Grades: 9-12
- Enrollment: 795 (2024-2025)
- Student to teacher ratio: 20.60
- Colors: Red and gray
- Mascot: Larry Laker
- Rival: Fruitport High School; Grand Haven High School
- Newspaper: The Laker Anchor
- Website: Spring Lake High School

Student assessments
- 2021–22 school year Change vs. prior year

M-STEP 11th grade proficiency rates (Science / Social Studies)
- Advanced %: 20.1 / 13.4
- Proficient %: 24.2 / 26.8
- PR. Proficient %: 15.4 / 41.6
- Not Proficient %: 40.3 / 18.1

Average test scores
- SAT Total: 1098.9 (▼ −12.3)

Spring Lake High School is located in Spring Lake, Michigan, in the United States, in the Spring Lake Public Schools District, serving grades 9–12. It serves most of Spring Lake Township in Ottawa County, except slivers zoned to Grand Haven Area Public Schools and Fruitport Community Schools. It also serves part of Crockery Township.

== Academics ==
SLHS offers AP courses in U.S. History, Economics, Biology, Spanish, English, and Calculus.
