= Harbor Transit =

Transportation in northwestern Ottawa County, Michigan, United States

- Founded: 1975; 50 years ago
- Headquarters: 440 N Ferry St; Grand Haven, Michigan
- Service area: Ferrysburg-Grand Haven-Spring Lake
- Service type: Bus service, Dial-a-Ride
- Routes: 2, deviated seasonal
- Destinations: Ferrysburg; Grand Haven; Grand Haven Charter Township; Spring Lake; Spring Lake Township
- Annual ridership: 139,980 (2020)
- Website: harbortransit.org

Harbor Transit (officially, the Harbor Transit Multi-Modal Transportation System) is the primary bus agency providing intra- and inter-city public transportation service for the Ferrysburg–Grand Haven–Spring Lake tri-cities region in northwestern Ottawa County, Michigan, which is considered part of the Grand Rapids metropolitan area. The primary year-round service is demand-responsive point-to-point transportation; in addition, Harbor Transit operates two seasonal deviated routes (the Lakeshore Trolley and Beach Express) during the summer.

== History ==
Public transportation in Grand Haven began with the Grand Haven Street Railway Co., which operated steam dummy trains starting in 1895. The line ran from a terminal at Franklin and Second to the beach at Highland Park. These were replaced by electric streetcars in 1902 after the Grand Rapids, Grand Haven and Muskegon Railway purchased the Street Railway; the GRGH&M also operated electric interurban service to Grand Rapids via a spur off the main line to Muskegon at Grand Haven Junction. Regular ferry service operated over Lake Michigan from Grand Haven to Muskegon, Milwaukee, and Chicago, including the railcar ferry originally built by the Detroit, Grand Haven and Milwaukee Railway in the 1870s. Streetcars were discontinued in 1928, although buses had replaced the rail service by 1927, and the interurban right-of-way was purchased to build highways. The Grand Haven Transit Lines, a private bus company, assumed public transportation service in 1952.

Harbor Transit began operations as Dial-A Ride Transit in 1975; operations and maintenance are handled at its headquarters in Grand Haven. Its service area is 55 sq mi (140 km^{2}).

== Services ==
Harbor Transit operates two seasonal deviated routes serving the Grand Haven City Beach in addition to its primary dial-a-ride service. The Lakeshore Trolley travels through historic Grand Haven, while the Beach Express provides park-and-ride service from three large parking lots.

Harbor Transit deviated routes
Route no.	Terminus	via (Destinations)	Terminus	Season	Notes / Refs.
Lakeshore Trolley (Buccaneer Loop)	Holiday Inn	Beacon, Jackson, Harbor, & Lake (Chinook Pier, Grand Haven State Park, Grand Haven City Beach, Tri-Cities Historical Museum, Central Park / City Hall, Downtown Grand Haven, Eastpointe RV Resort)	Holiday Inn	Memorial Day – Labor Day	
Lakeshore Trolley (Laker Loop)	Holiday Inn	Exchange, Fruitport, Spring Lake, & No. Shore (Tanglefoot Park, Spring Lake Central Park, Lakeside Beach, Pomona Park, Coast Guard Park, North Shore Fisherman's Lot)	Holiday Inn	Memorial Day – Labor Day	
Beach Express	Grand Haven City Beach	US-31 & M-104 (Grand Haven Meijer, Taylor Avenue Lot, Spring Lake Orchard Market)	Grand Haven City Beach	Memorial Day – Labor Day	

=== Fares ===
For point-to-point travel, adult fares for service scheduled the same day are US$2.50, discounted to half price ($1.25) for qualified individuals (youths, seniors, and disabled). If the service is scheduled the day before, fares are $1.50, discounted to $0.75 for qualified individuals. However, fare collection has been suspended during the COVID-19 pandemic in Michigan. For the two deviated routes, fares are $2.50, but were not collected during the pandemic.

=== Transfers ===
Riders may transfer to Muskegon Area Transit System at Mercy Clinic in Norton Shores, Michigan.

== Fleet ==
The Harbor Transit fleet primarily uses cutaway van buses that seat between 18 and 24 passengers.
