= Fruitport =

Fruitport may refer to the following places in the U.S. state of Michigan:

- Fruitport Charter Township, Michigan
- Fruitport, Michigan, a village within the township
