= The Accidentals =

American musical band

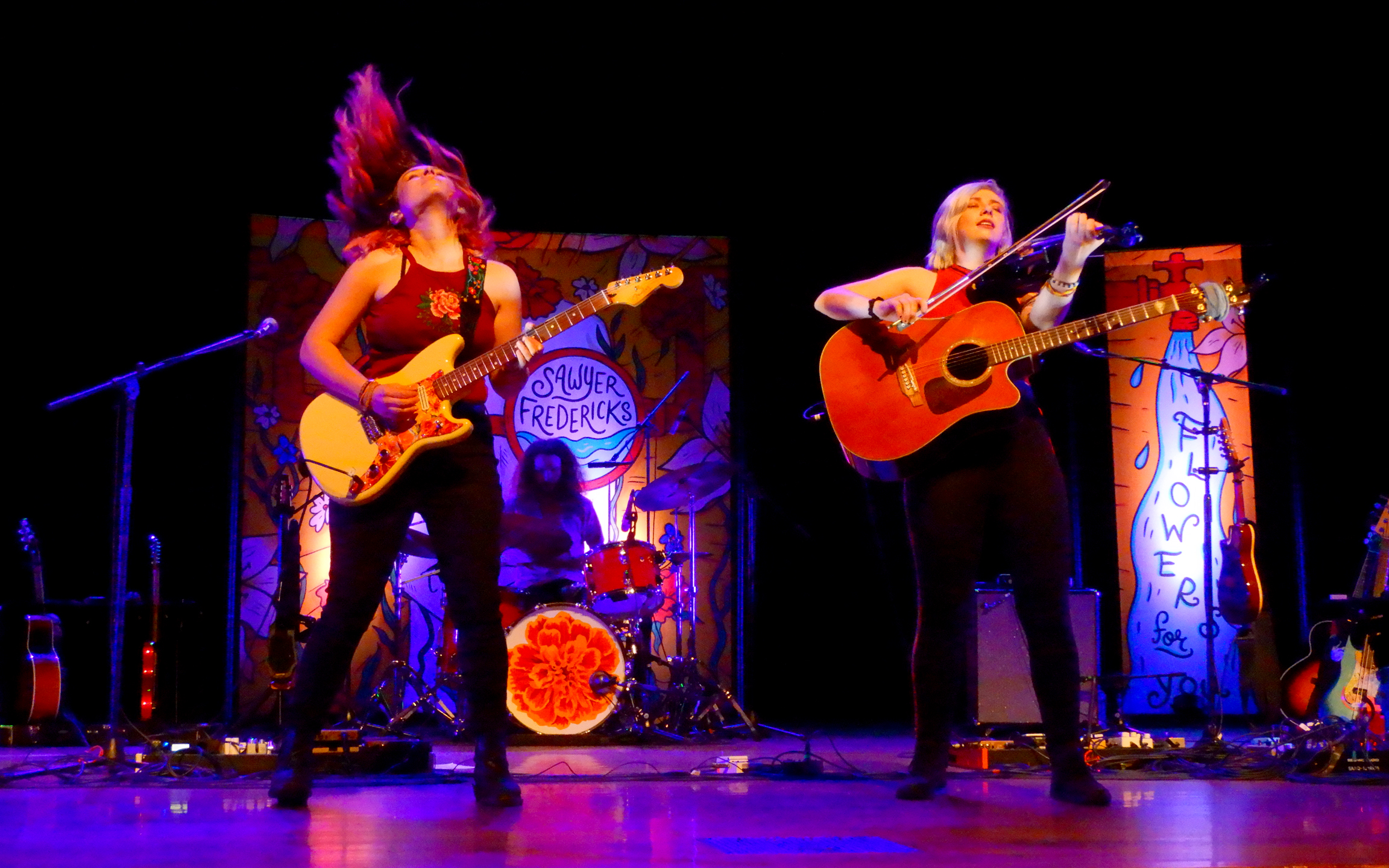
- The Accidentals in October 2021

Background information
- Origin: Traverse City, Michigan, United States
- Genres: Indie rock, indie folk, folk rock, contemporary folk, folk pop, Americana, classical
- Years active: 2012–present
- Label: Independent (previously with Sony Masterworks)
- Members: Sav Madigan; Katie Larson; Katelynn Corll
- Past members: Michael Dause
- Website: theaccidentalsmusic.com

The Accidentals are an American band, formed in Traverse City, Michigan in 2012 by singer-songwriters and multi-instrumentalists Sav Buist (now Sav Madigan) and Katie Larson. The group has featured an eclectic blend of indie folk, pop, bluegrass, rock, classical, and other genres. They have released eight full-length albums, four EPs, and two live albums.

Buist and Larson grew up in musical families, released their first two albums while in high school, hired percussionist Michael Dause in 2014, and began touring nationally. Dause departed in March 2023 and was replaced by Katelynn Corll. The band signed with major label Sony Masterworks by the time the members were around age 21, but they returned to releasing their recordings independently. Now based in Nashville, they tour and lead music workshops across the US.

== History ==
=== 2011–2012: Beginnings and Tangled Red and Blue ===
Larson and Buist met as young musicians in 2011 at their public high school, Traverse City West in Traverse City, Michigan. Larson, then 15, was a freshman cello player, and Buist was a 16-year-old sophomore who played violin; they teamed up for a class orchestra project. Larson recalled that a key encounter that inspired her and Buist to pursue a professional music career was when they attended a school workshop by the Moxie Strings, which was the first time they had seen a female duo playing electrified orchestral instruments in a popular style. In 2012, they auditioned and won a spot in the first-ever singer-songwriter major at the renowned Interlochen Center for the Arts high school, where they formally created The Accidentals.

In an interview with Post Independent, Larson described the formation of the band:

We didn't really start interacting with each other until I was 15 and Savannah was 16. Our orchestra instructor asked for volunteers to play an event. Savannah and I were the only two people who raised our hands.

Larson had visited Buist's house to discuss their impending project, during which time Larson had played a song on Buist's guitar that she hadn't played for anyone prior to their meeting. From that moment on, they were in a band.

Of the band's name origins, the band said in radio interviews that they had decided on "The Accidentals" because of the accidental note in music, which is denoted by a pitch that is not a member of the scale or mode that is specified by the most recently applied key signature, and the coincidental qualities behind its relation to their meeting each other by chance.

On May 21, 2012, the Accidentals released their self-produced debut full-length album, Tangled Red and Blue. The album features 13 tracks ranging across a spectrum of contemporary folk sounds and was met with strong local reception upon its release. Their eclectic use of instruments, such as the kazoo on "The Band-Aid Song", and the tackling of potent themes such as sexism, female stereotypes, and feminism on "Jargon" and "Enlightened Sexism" (inspired by a book of the same name by Susan J. Douglas analyzing sexism in modern pop culture), had garnered Larson and Buist local acclaim.

Prior to their meeting, Larson and Buist were budding singer-songwriters and instrumentalists. Larson had developed a music video for a demo of her original song "The Temptation of St. Anthony" as her senior year stop-motion animation project. The song is based on the Salvador Dalí painting of the same name and was available to be viewed on her Facebook and YouTube pages. Many of Buist's pre-Accidentals works can be heard on her SoundCloud page.

=== 2013–2015: Bittersweet and national reception ===
On April 9, 2013, the Accidentals opened a Kickstarter campaign in an attempt to fund their sophomore album, Bittersweet, offering signed versions of the album, behind-the-scenes footage, backstage meet-and-greets, and an exclusive song titled "Family Tree" for backers of various pledge levels. Less than one month later, on May 6, 2013, the Accidentals successfully funded the album.

Released on June 17, 2013, Bittersweet was co-produced by Buist, Larson, and a slew of producers from across Michigan, Nashville, and Bloomington, Indiana. Most notably, war-themed closing track "Blessed" was produced and mixed in Bloomington by Zero Boys' Paul Mahern, who previously worked with artists such as Willie Nelson and John Mellencamp.

Increased production values and stronger songwriting developments brought the band a broader acclaim than their previous, fully self-produced work in Bittersweet, garnering the attention of multiple publications. Yahoo! Voices journalist Jonathan Frahm was among the first to note the band as genre-benders, saying, "They're the best folk/jazz/bluegrass/classical/alternative band out there today", and "one of the most ground-breaking musical experiences one might just have in a lifetime".

During that period of time, the Accidentals collaborated with multiple local artists on the development of their own releases, including engineering, production, and performance credits on Olivia Mainville's Full Steam Ahead and string section and harmony credits on the Way Down Wanderers' single, "Dead Birds". They contributed music to independent films One Simple Question and Please Wait To Be Seated in 2013 and 2015 respectively. They also contributed five songs from Tangled Red and Blue to Right Brain Brewery mini-documentary Hops. The song "The Silence" was used in a television advertisement for Shanty Creek Resorts.

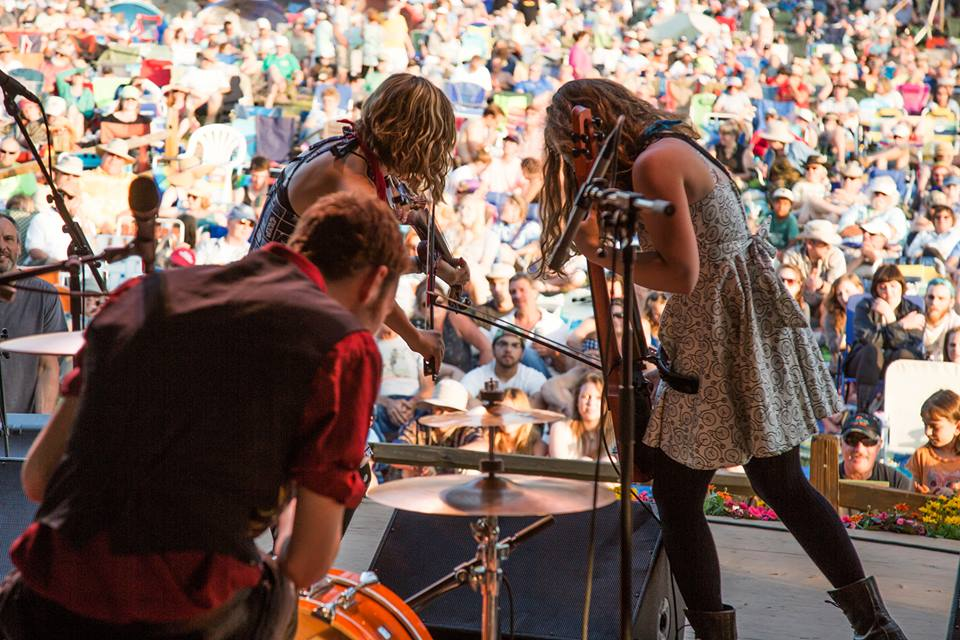
The Accidentals open for Arlo Guthrie at Main Stage at Blissfest in 2015.

Throughout 2013 and 2014, the duo kept busy gaining renown by opening for artists such as Brandi Carlile, Andrew Bird, Dar Williams, Ladysmith Black Mambazo, Sixto Rodriguez (Sugar Man), The Duhks, Aunt Martha, Rosco Bandana, and Lauren Mann. Music videos for the songs "Lemons in Chamomile" and "City of Cardboard" from Bittersweet were released on the band's official YouTube page. Their most viewed music video during this time was an acoustic rendition of Buist's folk-pop song "Epitaphs".

Taking advantage of the steam garnering behind their latest effort, the band pushed single "The Silence" onto ReverbNation after a slew of shows across Michigan and the east coast between 2013 and 2014, eventually garnering the attention of musician Marshall Crenshaw and record producer Stewart Lerman in 2015. In 2014, the band hired Novi, Michigan-hailing new wave multi-instrumentalist and Treeskin artist Michael Dause as their full-time percussionist.

In early 2015, the Accidentals used Indiegogo to fund their first-ever national tour, the "MAKING IT HAPPEN!" U.S. tour, which was successfully funded on March 20, 2015. The band toured through cities including Chicago, Cave Creek, Arizona, San Diego, California, and Salt Lake City, Utah with notable tour dates at South by Southwest (SXSW) 2015 and with the Traverse Symphony Orchestra in March and April, respectively.

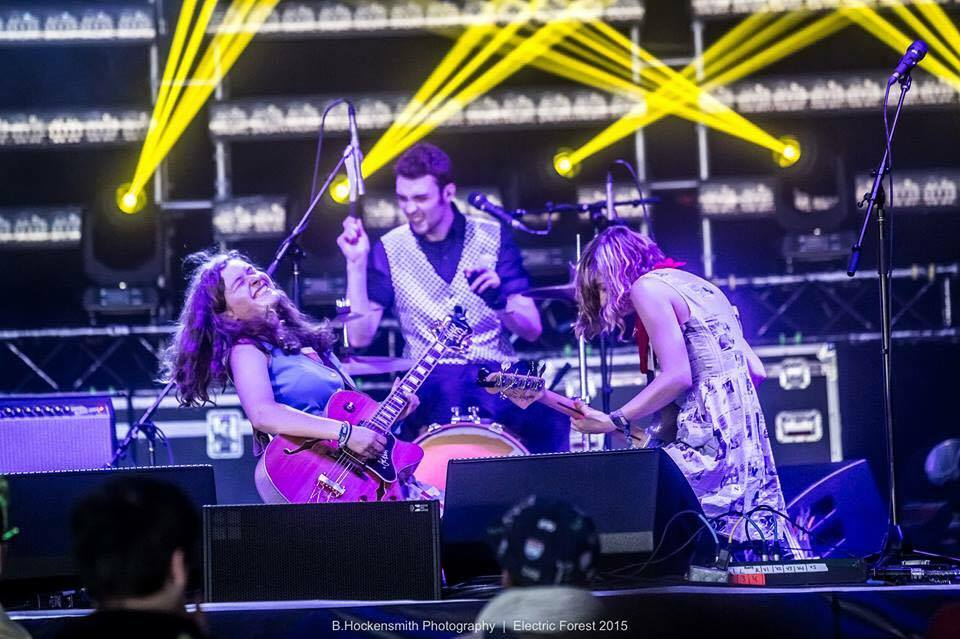
The Accidentals perform on the Jubilee Stage at Electric Forest in 2015.

During the "MAKING IT HAPPEN!" tour, the band was popularly received as one of SXSW's seven breakout acts out of some 2,200 acts, according to Billboard. During the tour, the Accidentals performed alongside Ben Sollee at Chicago's City Winery and with The Wailers at the Orbit Room in Grand Rapids, Michigan. They had their first headlining show at renowned folk music venue The Ark on June 7, 2015, after the tour, as well as at Electric Forest and Blissfest's respective 2015 iterations.

On August 25, 2015, Marshall Crenshaw joined the Accidentals for their first-ever live joint performance during the final Tuesday Evening Music Club show of the summer at Meijer Gardens. Post-show, Crenshaw praised a "precocious" Accidentals for their engaging live technique, saying in a statement to the Michigan music publication Local Spins, "They're killer. They go out there with the instinct of a killer. It was really something."

=== 2016: Parking Lot EP ===
The band announced that they had opted to continue independently releasing their music after renegotiating their contract with Crenshaw and Lerman, a contract that Buist later described as "a situation that wasn't healthy". The band released two new singles, "Parking Lot" and "Michigan and Again" for a "name your price" option via their official Bandcamp page. Each release was accompanied by a music video, with the "Michigan and Again" video becoming their most popular to date: it had over a quarter million views on Facebook and YouTube within 10 days of its release and reached No. 2 on Reddit's Indie Folk chart. The Accidentals later spoke with NPR on its Weekend Edition, during which Buist detailed the developmental process of "Michigan and Again", which began after a recommendation from a friend of the band to write a song about their home state. During that time, the band had their song "Bittersweet" featured on the second season of Netflix series Bloodline, on Episode 2.06.

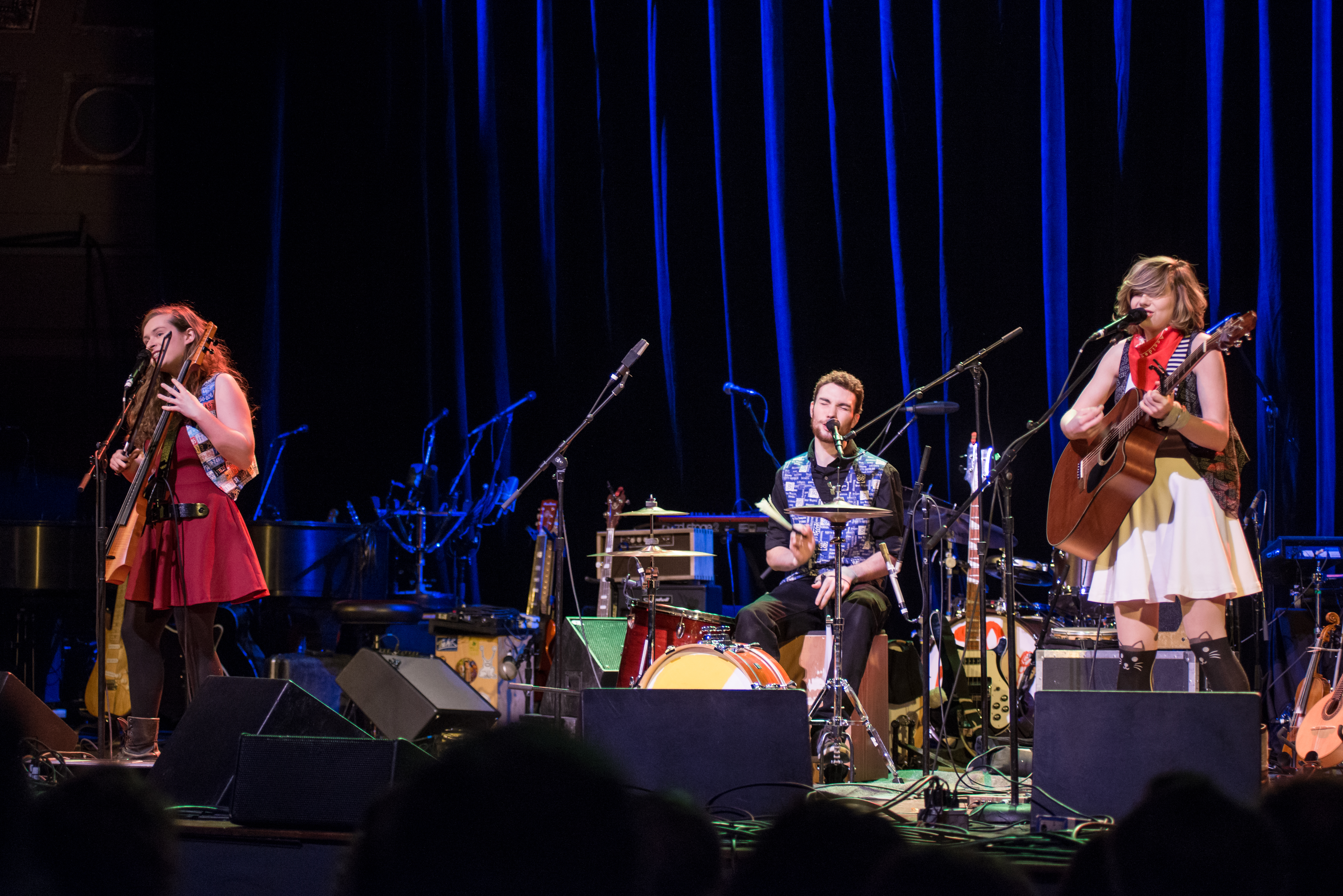
The Accidentals perform at the Ann Arbor Folk Festival in 2016.

The Accidentals independently released the Parking Lot EP on NoiseTrade for free download on June 1, 2016. The EP includes the titular "Parking Lot", as well as a remixed version of the song featuring rapper Rick Chyme that they call "FRAP", or "folk-rap". Reviews for the EP were generally positive, often citing the band's "genre-bending" evolution since Bittersweet. John Sinkevics of Local Spins called it "another entertaining step forward on a magical indie-folk journey". Jonathan Frahm of For Folk's Sake said, "We're catching them at a compelling—and even inspirational—transitional portion of their careers."

They were named one of the Huffington Post's Sweet 16 of 2016 by entertainment and sports journalist Michael Blalas on December 21, 2016. Blalas said of the band, "Ah, the beauty of youthful exuberance. It's a wonderful thing, to be sure, but when you have brains, musical talent, enthusiasm and the ability to connect with a growing fan base through the monster method of social media and viral videos, there's no telling how far you can go", and that "The Accidentals certainly didn't happen by accident."

=== 2017–2018: Sony Masterworks and Odyssey ===
On January 9, 2017, the band announced that they were signed to Sony Masterworks via a feature in Local Spins, and they said they were looking forward to releasing the album internationally sometime during the spring of the same year. The band announced that the album would feature multiple guest performers, including Jack White bassist Dominic John Davis, Jenny Conlee of The Decemberists, Keller Williams, Kaki King, Lily & Madeleine, and Carbon Leaf. Buist described Masterworks as "a family of like-minded music nerds that gets us and our music, and wants to support that authentically"; Larson added, "We feel like we can be truly who we are and they appreciate the honesty." Masterworks is primarily a classical and jazz label, having previously signed artists such as Yo-Yo Ma, Sonny Rollins, and Yanni, although the label expanded its reach with its signing of indie folk duo Tall Heights and acknowledgement of bluegrass on The Goat Rodeo Sessions. Leo Sacks, a Grammy-winning producer and A&R consultant to Masterworks, was responsible for bringing the band to the label; Sacks had also brought Tall Heights to the label.

Sony Masterworks announced the title of the band's upcoming third album, Odyssey, on March 10, 2017 and announced that it would be released sometime during the summer of that same year. The Accidentals released their lead single, "KW" (feat. Keller Williams), from the impending record on that same day. In March 2018, Texas Lifestyle Magazine named The Accidentals their "must-see" band of SXSW 2018. Masterworks released the second single from Odyssey, "Memorial Day" (written and sung by Larson), on May 19, 2017. The titular third single, "Odyssey", was released on July 24, 2017.

On August 18, 2017, the Accidentals released Odyssey via Sony Masterworks and embarked on tour throughout the United States and Canada to promote the album. The album received positive reviews from critics including PopMatters, AllMusic, and Local Spins. In a post premiering the album, NPR's Jewly Hight noted the album's "equal interest in the focused musical forms of indie rock and pop and the expansive potential of orchestral arrangements, jam band open-endedness and impressionistic singer-songwriter expression" and said, "The Accidentals know all about using finesse, and fun, to make an impact." In December 2017, ABC News named Odyssey one of the best albums of 2017, and Michael Blalas of Huffington Post put the Accidentals at Number 2 on his "Best of Music List in 2017", after Aimee Mann.

In January 2018, the Accidentals released the music video for the song "Earthbound" from Odyssey, and Michigan Radio named them one of the "Top West Michigan musicians of 2017".

The week before the 2018 United States elections, the Accidentals independently released the single "Heavy Flag", and the day before the election Billboard released the music video for the song, featuring a montage of social and environmental images. Buist stated in writing that the song she was inspired by the iconic photograph Raising the Flag on Iwo Jima, and she wanted the song to make a statement about the "weight and responsibility of our generation to care for our resources". Larson insisted that the band's goal in releasing the song before the election was to avoid a "divisive message" and instead to encourage "everyone to become more aware, more informed and participate". The band participated in a "get out the vote" mini-tour in Michigan with Clean Water Campaign for Michigan, leading up to the election.

In late 2018, Buist and Larson played a series of collaborative shows with fellow singer-songwriters Beth Nielsen Chapman and May Erlewine, and the full band recorded a song in Cleveland, Ohio with the Contemporary Youth Orchestra.

=== 2019–2020: Audiotree Live, the Live album, and livestreaming ===
On January 3, 2019, the band debuted their December 2018 Audiotree session as a digital release. They also released a live EP titled The Accidentals on Audiotree Live featuring the songs performed during their session. It includes a live rendition of "Heavy Flag" alongside four previously unreleased songs.

On January 22, 2019, the band's gear trailer, containing $70,000 worth of equipment, was stolen from a hotel parking lot in Tucson, Arizona. The trailer was later found, empty, on the edge of the desert. More than 550 fans raised over $40,000 within eight days after the theft to help replace the stolen equipment. The band said that immediately after the theft they wondered whether it would be the end of their band, but then were amazed by "the sheer amount of people coming out of the woodwork and helping us get by and get back on our feet".

The band released a new live album, Live, on April 28, 2019. Live combines new songs with cover versions of "Clementine" by Sarah Jaffe, "Where Is My Mind?" by the Pixies, and "Gold Lion" by the Yeah Yeah Yeahs. PopMatters named the album among the best folk albums of 2019, noting that the band had "mastered the art of producing a rocking stage presence that is utterly palpable here".

The Accidentals made their first overseas tour in May 2019, playing shows in Ireland and the United Kingdom. In June, DJ Swivel released a remix of the song "Euphoria" by Jungkook of BTS, with string tracks by Buist and Larson; the song reached 23 million plays on SoundCloud and 29 million plays on YouTube by October 2021.

In November 2019, the band compiled and contributed to the compilation album Michigan Music to support singer-songwriter Ralston Bowles, whose wife was diagnosed with cancer and who had introduced the band to rapper Rick Chyme, the band's collaborator on Parking Lot. On Christmas Day, New West Records released a cover version of The Beatles' song "Across the Universe" performed by the Accidentals with Lily & Madeleine. The Accidentals had previously performed a version of the same song with Jenny Conlee in 2016.

Through 2019 and into 2020, the band continued touring at what Buist called a "grueling pace", starting 2020 with appearances in January at the Folk Alliance International conference in New Orleans, followed by another session at Paste magazine in New York City (their first session there was in 2017), before heading westward on a tour of venues across the United States.

Then, in mid-March of 2020, the COVID-19 pandemic shut down all live music performances and much other normal social activity across North America. After playing a show in Norman, Oklahoma on March 12, the band canceled the rest of their tour (about 100 appearances, including a planned return to SXSW in Austin) and retreated to Michigan, where they also shelved their plan to release a new album later in 2020. Like many other musicians, the band faced a sudden loss of most of their income, and they found the uncertainty and losses in the music community around them to be "devastating" and "overwhelming".

During April and May of 2020, the band presented a free daily livestream at noon on Facebook and YouTube called "Daily Breather" that they described as a time to "light a candle for healing, be thankful, tell a song story, and play a song, maybe 15 minutes". One music commentator who discovered the "Daily Breather" series put it on his best-of-year list and said of it: "The stories, the calmness and the compassion gave my mind sanity in an insane time."

During the year following the start of the pandemic shutdown, the band members presented some shows online (including charity festivals), did online workshops and session work, produced content for their Patreon supporters, and worked on finishing the rest of their next album and related music videos without a conventional producer, engineer, or recording studio. Buist wrote a guide to livestreaming for musicians that was referenced by the Recording Academy.

=== 2021–present: Time Out, Vessel, Reimagined, and Cover Art ===
On May 7, 2021, the band released the EP Time Out: Session #1, featuring five new songs co-written with folk artists that the band met via Zoom during the pandemic. Its first track, "Wildfire", was co-written with Kim Richey, whom Buist had met while assisting her with some livestream events. The song "Anyway" was co-written with Tom Paxton, "Might As Well Be Gold" with Maia Sharp, "Night Train" with Dar Williams, and "All Shall Be Well" with Mary Gauthier and Jaimee Harris. "Night Train", when it was released as a single prior to the EP release, was one of Rolling Stone's country music picks in March.

In July 2021, the band began playing their first in-person concerts since March 2020. Dause said that one of the first in-person performances after 16 months, in front of about 2,000 people, felt "unreal". In September, the band performed on the NPR radio show Mountain Stage.

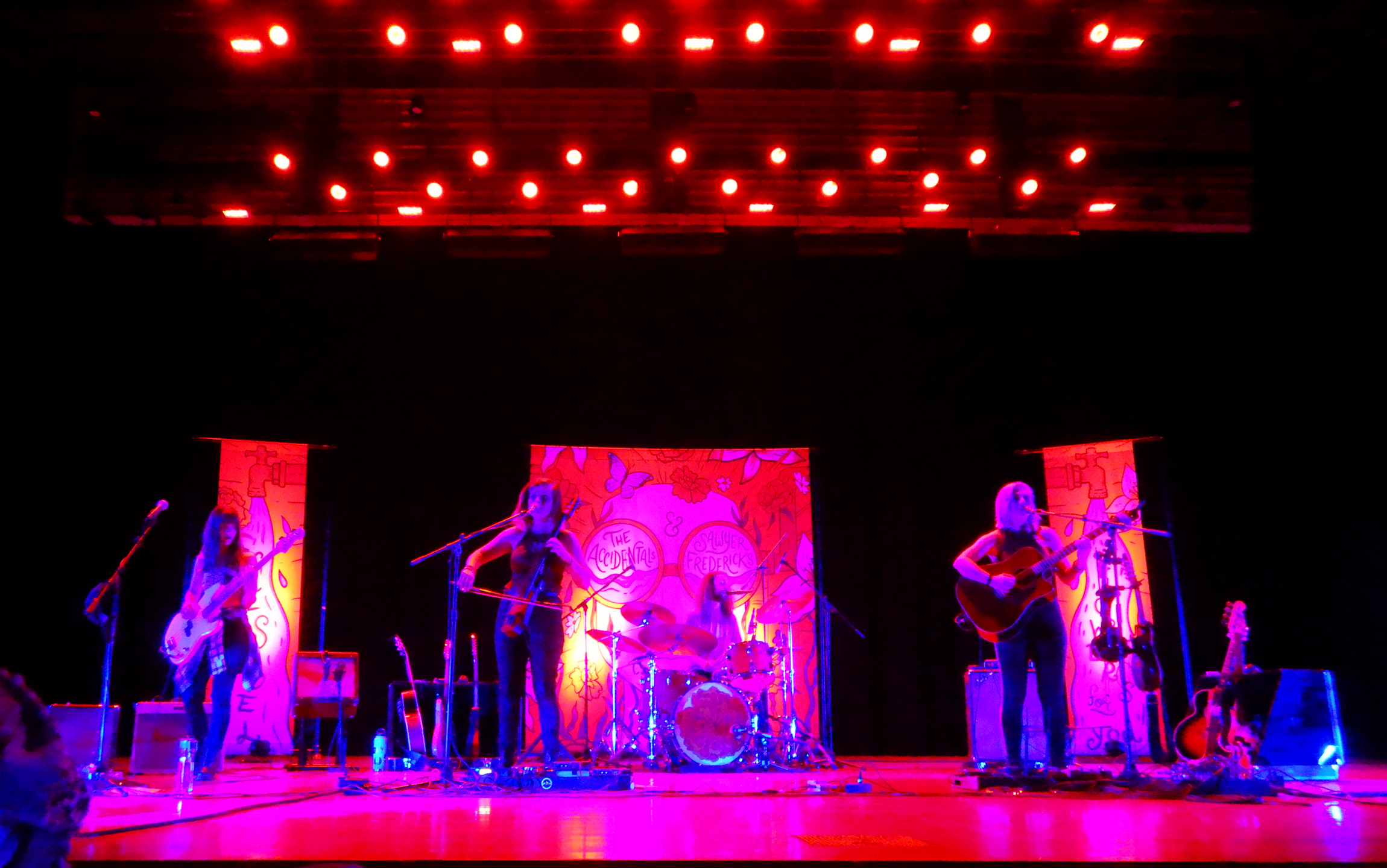
The Accidentals perform with Patty PerShayla during the Vessel tour in October 2021.

On October 1, 2021, the band released the album Vessel, a release that had been planned for 2020 but was postponed during the pandemic. A few of the album's songs had been recorded before the pandemic with producers John Congleton and Tucker Martine, but the rest was finished by the band members in their homes. One of the album's songs, "Count the Rings", when it was released as a single prior to the album release, was one of Rolling Stone's country music picks in September. The magazine said that the song "nimbly walks the lines between angular post-punk and jangly Americana" and has a chorus with "the bittersweet spirit of Nineties alt-rock". Buist stated that the theme of Vessel is "about taking everything into perspective, zooming out, seeing where we are, stop feeling like we're trying to race to get to a certain place". She said that the "black-and-white" tone of the Time Out EP contrasts with the "neon, bright colors" of the Vessel album's sound.

Around the time Vessel was released, the band embarked on a tour from Michigan to the East Coast and Southeast US with co-headlining singer-songwriter Sawyer Fredericks. Buist and Larson had contributed string tracks to two songs on Fredericks's album Flowers for You: "Lies You Tell" and "Days Go By". For the tour, multi-instrumentalist and vocalist Patty PerShayla (who has her own rock band, The Mayhaps) joined the Accidentals as a temporary member.

On March 4, 2022, the band released the EP Time Out: Session #2. Its first track "Eastern Standard Time" features co-writer Peter Mulvey on guitar, Maia Sharp co-wrote and plays keyboard on "Just a Town", Tom Paxton co-wrote "Remain the Same", Gary Burr and Georgia Middleman co-wrote "Leave it in the Dust", Beth Nielsen Chapman co-wrote and plays keyboard on "Circling Round Again", Gretchen Peters co-wrote "Wide Open", and Dominic Davis plays bass on a few tracks. Buist and Larson joined Chapman, Richey, and Sharp for a "Time Out" tour in March.

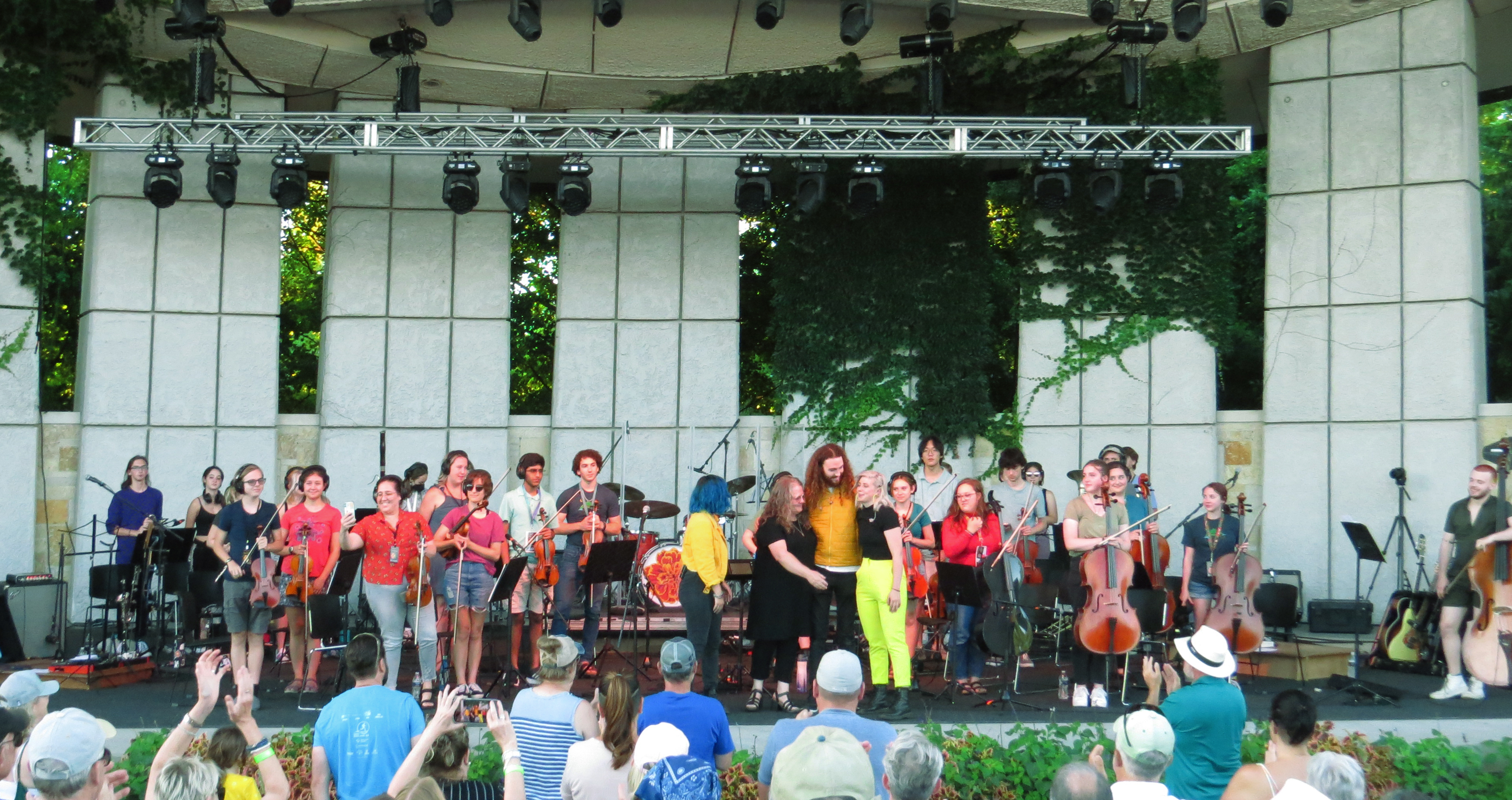
The Accidentals and Kaboom Collective studio orchestra stand during an ovation after a performance on the Reimagined tour in August 2022.

The band released a collaborative album on July 29, 2022 titled Reimagined with Kaboom Collective studio orchestra directed by Liza Grossman, featuring new orchestral arrangements of 12 of the band's songs. The Accidentals and Kaboom Collective embarked on a tour of the Midwest beginning with a concert at the Rock and Roll Hall of Fame on August 3, 2022.

Buist won the Overall Grand Prize and won in the folk category in the 27th Annual USA Songwriting Competition in December 2022 for writing the song "The Line" from Vessel.

In early March 2023, the band released the full-length album Time Out containing the songs from the two previous EPs and played a series of intimate shows "in the round" with Mary Bragg, Gary Burr, and Georgia Middleman. On March 31, 2023, Dause announced that he was leaving the band to pursue other projects and focus attention on his new recording studio, TreeTone Studios in Grand Rapids, Michigan. Detroit multi-instrumentalist Katelynn Corll took his place. She made her first appearance with the band at SXSW in March 2023. Patty PerShayla again joined the band for many of their 2023 concerts.

In early July 2023, Pete Souza, a former chief official White House photographer, spent a day with the band, photographing them and their concert in Marquette Park on Mackinac Island; he posted about it twice on his popular Instagram account. The band had met Souza by chance a year before at Blissfest, soon after which Souza made his first post about them on Instagram.

The band helped organize and then performed at the first annual Fair Ground Festival on August 27, 2023, a one-day music festival in Barry County, Michigan near Hastings which featured a lineup of female-driven musical acts: Kyshona, Ruthie Foster, The Crane Wives, Patty PerShayla & The Mayhaps, and Joseph. In September, Buist and Larson were instructors at Huco Songs Port Austin Artist in Residence Songwriter Retreat Weekend.

On January 24, 2024, Buist announced via social media that she was changing her name to Sav Madigan. It followed her announcement the year before that she was planning to release a solo album titled Mockingbird Suite, and the launch of her solo Patreon page in October 2023, all while she was pursuing a degree in biology at MTSU.

The Accidentals, with staff from Kaboom Collective and over 40 music students from the Appleton Area School District, Howard-Suamico School District and Green Bay Area Public School District, took part in workshops and collaborated to perform a concert of the Reimagined album at the Weidner Center in Green Bay, Wisconsin on April 11, 2024.

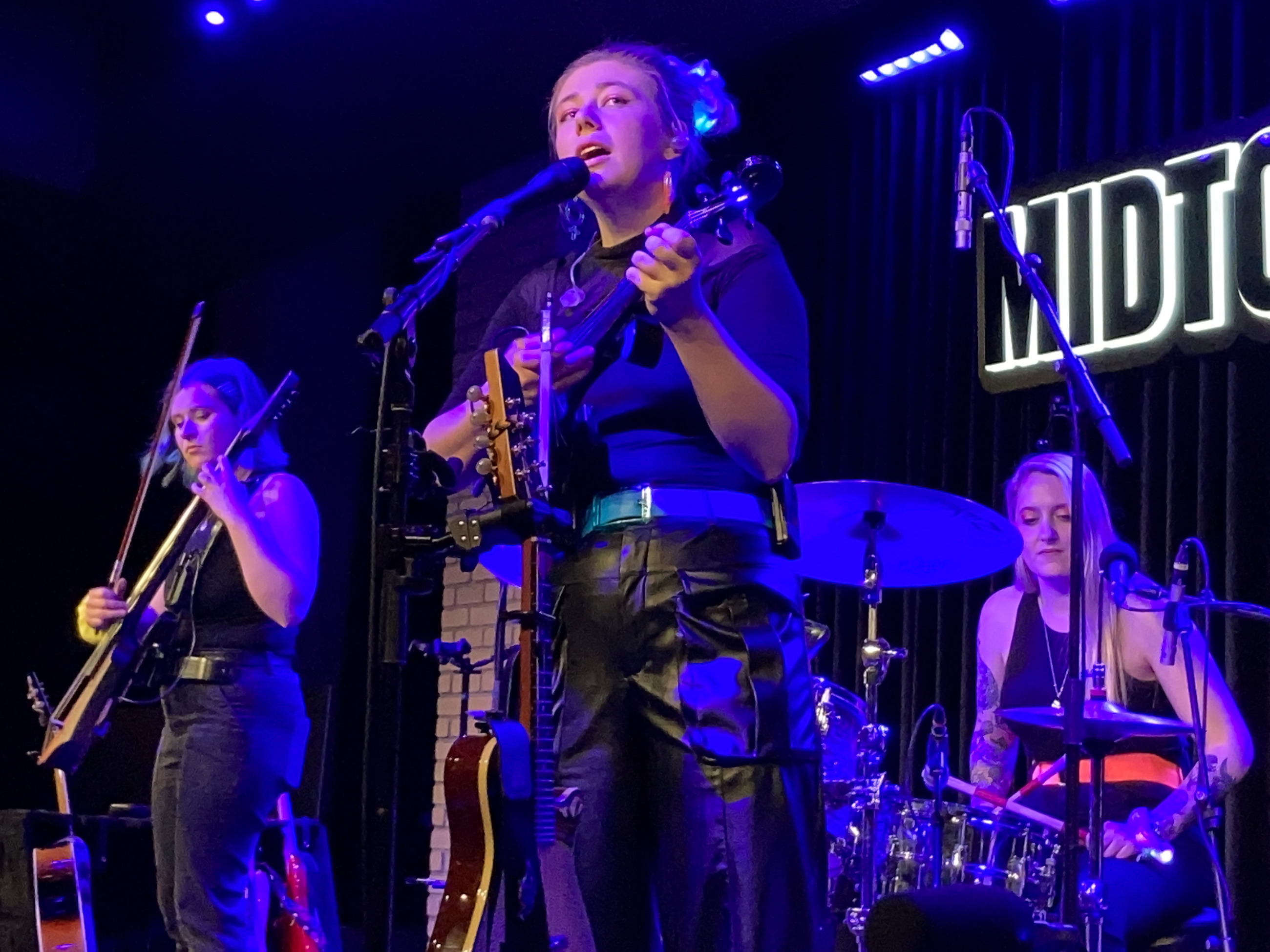
The Accidentals perform on the Cover Art tour in April 2024.

The album Cover Art, consisting of cover versions of songs by female artists, came to fruition in April 2024 with a supporting tour of Michigan and selected cities across the US. The album, which Local Spins said was "long-awaited", grew out of the band's "Play Your Paragon" video series, which started in 2020 and featured cover versions of songs by women. While recording the album, the band aimed to limit themselves to "three instruments and three voices" per song. The songs on the album are "Green and Gold" (Lianne La Havas), "Not Strong Enough" (boygenius), "Manhole" (Ani DiFranco), "Every Day Is a Winding Road" (Sheryl Crow), "Heart of Glass" (Blondie), "Don't Know Why" (Norah Jones), "Closer to Fine" (Indigo Girls), and "Hammond Song" (The Roches) with Kim Richey.

The EP Time Out: Session #3 was released on August 15, 2025, featuring songs co-written with songwriters such as Mary Bragg, Gary Burr and Georgia Middleman, Kim Richey, and David Wilcox.

The band launched their second collaboration with Kaboom Collective studio orchestra in 2025, releasing their winter holiday season album, Sonus Borealis: A Holiday Winter Collection, on October 24, 2025. The album includes covers of the songs "A Hazy Shade of Winter" (Paul Simon of Simon & Garfunkel), "Northern Attitude" (Noah Kahan & Gabe Simon), "River" (Joni Mitchell), "Pennies from Heaven" (Arthur Johnston & Johnny Burke), "Christmas in L.A." (Vulfpeck), "Silent Night" (Franz Xaver Gruber & Joseph Mohr), "I've Got My Love to Keep Me Warm" (Irving Berlin), "White Winter Hymnal" (Robin Pecknold of Fleet Foxes), "Someday at Christmas" (Ron Miller & Bryan Wells), "All I Want for Christmas Is You" (Mariah Carey & Walter Afanasieff), "Wonderful Christmastime" (Paul McCartney), "DJ Play a Christmas Song" (Sarah Hudson & others), and "Christmas Eve Sarajevo" (Jon Oliva, Robert Kinkel & Paul O'Neill). The Accidentals & Kaboom Collective did a multi-city tour performing the album in December 2025.

== Musical style and development ==
While Tangled Red and Blue could be described as a contemporary folk release, the musical style attributed to The Accidentals following Bittersweet is "genre-bending". Self-described orchestra dorks, or "orc dorks", the group embraces its complex musical sound and style. "You can't really put us in one genre", according to Buist. Jim Linderman of the Dull Tool and Dim Bulb blog referred to them in 2014 as "the best unsigned band in America" and "tastefully eccentric", adding: "They pack performing space with a multi-generational mix."

In 2015 the band delved into blues, rock and roll and hip-hop musicality, as can be heard in songs such as "Trouble" and "Parking Lot", as well as in collaborations with artists such as Rick Chyme. In 2019, the band described their sound as "folk-influenced pop rock". In 2020, the band's Patreon page described them as "punk folk music with strings".

Describing the band's vision and emphasis on community in 2022, Buist said: "Music is powerful, it's therapeutic, and it's a lifeblood that ties us all together and overrides our differences."

== Influences ==
Growing up in musical families, including professional pianists for fathers and vocalists for mothers, Larson's and Buist's influences bounced between jazz, country, classical, bluegrass, alternative rock and the obscure. Their self-described "all over the place" list of influences in 2015 included Andrew Bird, Stéphane Grappelli, Arcade Fire, Death Cab for Cutie, St. Vincent, Django Reinhardt, Sufjan Stevens, The Appleseed Collective, and The National.

In a Coffeehouse Conversations session with WYEP-FM in 2015, Buist and Larson were asked who their top pick would be out of any artist with which they could possibly ever collaborate. During that session, Buist chose Ben Folds and Larson picked Jack White. They named more influences during the Coffeehouse Conversation: Chris Thile and Punch Brothers, Belle & Sebastian, Radiohead, and the White Stripes. In a "20 Questions" feature with PopMatters in 2017, the duo cited additional influences as topmost inspirations to their craft including Kimya Dawson, Patti Smith, Caroline Shaw, David Bowie, Freddie Mercury, and Brian May.

In an interview with Americana Highways in 2022, Buist mentioned a "top 10 bucket list, in any order" of dream future co-writers: Indigo Girls, Brandi Carlile, Stevie Nicks, Brittany Howard, Neko Case, Lianne La Havas, Sarah Jarosz, Anna Tivel, Ani DiFranco, and Aimee Mann.

== Members ==
- Sav Madigan – vocals, acoustic/electric violin and viola, acoustic/electric guitar, bass guitar, upright bass, mandolin, banjo, ukulele, and musical saw
- Katie Larson – vocals, acoustic/electric cello, acoustic/electric guitar, bass guitar, ukulele, glockenspiel, and kazoo
- Katelynn Corll – drums, percussion, vocals, guitar

== Discography ==
=== Albums ===
| Title | Album details |
|---|---|
| Tangled Red and Blue | Release date: May 21, 2012; Label: The Accidentals |
| Bittersweet | Release date: June 17, 2013; Label: The Accidentals |
| Odyssey | Release date: August 18, 2017; Label: Sony Masterworks |
| Vessel | Release date: October 1, 2021; Label: The Accidentals |
| Reimagined | Release date: July 29, 2022; Label: The Accidentals & Kaboom Collective |
| Time Out | Release date: March 3, 2023; Label: The Accidentals |
| Cover Art | Release date: May 10, 2024; Label: The Accidentals |
| Sonus Borealis | Release date: October 24, 2025; Label: The Accidentals & Kaboom Collective |

=== EPs ===
| Title | EP details |
|---|---|
| Parking Lot | Release date: June 1, 2016; Label: The Accidentals |
| Time Out: Session #1 | Release date: May 7, 2021; Label: The Accidentals |
| Time Out: Session #2 | Release date: March 4, 2022; Label: The Accidentals |
| Time Out: Session #3 | Release date: August 15, 2025; Label: The Accidentals |

=== Live albums ===
| Title | Album details |
|---|---|
| The Accidentals on Audiotree Live | Release date: January 3, 2019; Label: Audiotree |
| The Accidentals Live | Release date: April 28, 2019; Label: The Accidentals |

The Accidentals publish their music under the name Savage Kittens Publishing.

== Filmography ==
- 2013 Right Brain Brewery mini-documentary on hops
- 2013 One Simple Question independent film
- 2015 Please Wait To Be Seated independent film (songs used: "City of Cardboard", "Miso Soup", and "The Silence")
- 2016 Netflix series Bloodline, episode 2.06 (song used: "Bittersweet")
- 2018 Turner Classic Movies trailer featuring song "Chekhov's Gun"
- 2018 Almost Home independent film

== Awards and nominations ==
Awards won:

- 2013 Traverse magazine's "Best Band"
- 2014 Traverse magazine's "Best Band"
- 2015 Traverse magazine's "Best Band"
- 2015 ArtPrize Music Awards at St. Cecilia Music Center, folk/country public vote winner
- 2015 WYCE Jammie Award "Best Album by a New Artist"
- 2016 Traverse magazine's "Best Band"
- 2017 Traverse magazine's "Best Band"
- 2017 WYCE Jammie Award "Album of the Year"
- 2017 WYCE Jammie Award "Song of the Year"
- 2018 WYCE Jammie Award "Best Rock/Pop Album"
- 2018 Traverse magazine's "Best Band"
- 2019 Traverse magazine's "Best Band"
- 2020 Traverse magazine's "Best Band"
- 2023 Michigan Music Video Awards, best country/Americana video
- 2026 WYCE Jammie Award "Best Contemporary Folk Album"
