= Mona Shores Public Schools =

School district in Michigan

Address
- 121 Randall Road Norton Shores, Muskegon County, Michigan, 49441; United States

District information
- Superintendent: Bill O'Brien
- Schools: 6
- Budget: $81,154,000 2022-2023 expenditures
- NCES District ID: 2624120

Students and staff
- Students: 3,971 (2024-25)
- Teachers: 223.01 FTE (2024-2025)
- Staff: 495.29 FTE (2024-2025)
- Student–teacher ratio: 17.81 (2024-2025)

Other information
- Website: www.monashores.net

Mona Shores Public Schools is a public school district headquartered in Norton Shores, Michigan, in the western side of the state near Lake Michigan. The district is located just south of Muskegon and includes most of the city of Norton Shores (except a sliver in the north served by Muskegon Public Schools and a sliver in the south served by Grand Haven Area Public Schools) and all of the neighboring city of Roosevelt Park. It also serves a small part of Fruitport Township.

== History ==
The district was formed in 1959, when the residents of the existing districts of Churchill, Hile, Lincoln, Maple Grove, and Mona Beach (all K-8 districts) voted to unite into a single K-12 district. Little Black Lake District was part of the original talks, but withdrew when consolidation was recommended; it later merged into Grand Haven Area Public Schools. Mona Shores High School opened in fall 1962. The architect was Warren Holmes Company.

== Schools ==
Schools in Mona Shores Public Schools district
| School | Address | Notes |
|---|---|---|
| Mona Shores High School | 1121 Seminole Road, Norton Shores | Grades 9–12. Built 1962. |
| Mona Shores Middle School | 1700 Woodside Road, Norton Shores | Grades 6–8 |
| Campbell Elementary School | 1355 Greenwich Road, Norton Shores | Grades PreK-5 |
| Churchill Elementary School | 961 Porter Road, Norton Shores | Grades PreK-5 |
| Lincoln Park Elementary School | 2951 Leon Street, Norton Shores | Grades PreK-5 |
| Ross Park Elementary School | 121 Randall Road, Norton Shores | Grades PreK-5 |

== See also ==
- List of school districts in Michigan
