= Mike Teeter =

American football player and coach (born 1967)

No. 76, 67, 71
- Positions: Defensive tackle, defensive end

Personal information
- Born: October 4, 1967 (age 59); Grand Haven, Michigan, U.S.
- Listed height: 6 ft 2 in (1.88 m)
- Listed weight: 267 lb (121 kg)

Career information
- High school: Fruitport (MI)
- College: Michigan (1986–1989)
- NFL draft: 1990: undrafted
- Expansion draft: 1995: 35th round, 66th overall pick

Career history

Playing
- Indianapolis Colts (1990)*; Frankfurt Galaxy (1991); Minnesota Vikings (1991); Houston Oilers (1993–1994); Carolina Panthers (1995); Arizona Cardinals (1996)*
- * Offseason or practice squad member only

Coaching
- Indiana University (1997) (Defensive line)

Awards and highlights
- All-World League (1991); Second-team All-Big Ten (1989)

Career NFL statistics
- Tackles: 12
- Sacks: 1
- Forced fumbles: 1
- Stats at Pro Football Reference

Michael Lee Teeter (born October 4, 1967) is an American former professional football player who was a defensive lineman in the National Football League (NFL). He played college football as a middle guard for the Michigan Wolverines from 1986 to 1989. He played in the NFL as a special teams player for the Houston Oilers in 1993 and 1994. He also played during the spring of 1991 as a defensive lineman for the Frankfurt Galaxy in the World League of American Football (WLAF) and appeared in one game for the Minnesota Vikings in the fall of 1991.

== Early life ==
Teeter was born in Grand Haven, Michigan, in 1967. He attended Fruitport High School in Fruitport, Michigan. While attending Fruitport High School, he played football at multiple positions and also competed for the track team as a sprinter who could run the 40-yard dash in 4.6 seconds. He was the fastest and the strongest player on the Fruitport football team and played on both offense and defense. He was later inducted into the Fruitport Hall of Fame.

== College career ==
Teeter enrolled at the University of Michigan in 1986 and played college football as a middle guard for head coach Bo Schembechler's Wolverines football teams from 1986 to 1989. He did not become a starter until his senior year. That year, he started 12 games at middle guard for the 1989 Michigan Wolverines football team that compiled a 10–2 record, limited opponents to 184 points (15 points per game), and won the Big Ten championship in Bo Schembechler's final season as Michigan's head coach. Teeter won Michigan's Dick Katcher Award and was selected as a second-team All-Big Ten player in 1989. He received a Bachelor of Science degree in kinesiology from Michigan.

== Professional career ==
Teeter was not selected in the 1990 NFL draft. He signed with the Indianapolis Colts in 1990, but he was released in late August 1990, before the start of the 1990 NFL season.

During the spring of 1991, Teeter played as a defensive lineman for the Frankfurt Galaxy in the inaugural season of the World League of American Football (WLAF). He was selected to the WLAF's All-World team at the end of the 1991 season.

After playing for the Galaxy, Teeter signed as a free agent with the Minnesota Vikings and appeared in one game with the club during the 1991 season. He was waived by the Vikings in late August 1992.

Teeter returned to the NFL as a player for the Houston Oilers. He played on special teams for the Oilers in 28 games during the 1993 and 1994 seasons. He signed with the Carolina Panthers in 1995 but did not appear in any regular season games.

Teeter appeared in a total of 29 NFL games for the Vikings and Oilers. Teeter signed a contract for $1.4million in 1995 but then hurt his back

== Later life and honors ==
At the end of November 1996, after retiring as a player, Teeter was hired as the defensive line coach for the Indiana Hoosiers football team under head coach (and former Michigan assistant coach) Cam Cameron. Having been a teammate of Jim Harbaugh at Michigan, he served beside John Harbaugh as fellow assistant coaches on the Indiana staff. He served in that position for the 1997 Indiana Hoosiers football team that compiled a 2–9 record and allowed opponents to score 359 points (32.6 points per game).

In 1998, Teeter returned to Fruitport, Michigan, and became involved in the real estate business. He co-founded Capstone Real Estate in 2004. Teeter was inducted into the Muskegon Area Sports Hall of Fame in 2004.
