= Fruitport Charter Township, Michigan =

- Charter township
- Location within Michigan Location within the United States
- Coordinates: 43°8′52″N 86°09′08″W
- Country: United States
- State: Michigan
- County: Muskegon

Area
  - Total: 30.4 sq mi (79 km^{2})
  - Land: 30.0 sq mi (78 km^{2})
  - Water: 0.4 sq mi (1.0 km^{2})
- Elevation: 630 ft (192 m)

Population (2020)
  - Total: 14,575
  - Density: 486.3/sq mi (187.8/km^{2})
- Time zone: UTC-5 (Eastern (EST))
  - Summer (DST): UTC-4 (EDT)
- ZIP code: 49415 (Fruitport); 49444 (Muskegon); 49456 (Spring Lake); 49448 (Nunica)
- Area code: 231
- FIPS code: 26-121-31020
- GNIS feature ID: 1626325
- Website: www.fruitporttownship-mi.gov

Fruitport Charter Township is a charter township of Muskegon County in the U.S. state of Michigan. The population was 14,575 at the 2020 census. The village of Fruitport is within the township.

== Geography ==
The township is in southern Muskegon County, bordered to the south by Ottawa County. It is bordered to the west by the city of Norton Shores and partially to the north by the city of Muskegon, the county seat. The village of Fruitport is in the southern part of the township, along the county line.

Interstate 96 crosses the township, with access from Exit 4 (Airline Highway/3rd Avenue). The U.S. Route 31 freeway runs along or close to the western border of the township, with access from exits 107, 109, and 112. I-96 leads southeast 30 miles (48 km) to Grand Rapids and has its western terminus at US 31, which in turn leads north 61 miles (98 km) to Ludington and south 30 miles (48 km) to Holland.

According to the U.S. Census Bureau, the township has a total area of 30.4 square miles (79 km^{2}), of which 30.0 square miles (78 km^{2}) are land and 0.4 square miles (1.0 km^{2}), or 1.29%, are water. Norris Creek, a southwest-flowing tributary of Spring Lake and the Grand River, drains the southern part of the township, while Black Creek, a tributary of Mona Lake, drains the northern part.

== Demographics ==
Historical population
| Census | Pop. | Note | %± |
|---|---|---|---|
| 1880 | 880 | | — |
| 1890 | 1,446 | | 64.3% |
| 1900 | 927 | | −35.9% |
| 1910 | 958 | | 3.3% |
| 1920 | 1,073 | | 12.0% |
| 1930 | 1,454 | | 35.5% |
| 1940 | 2,330 | | 60.2% |
| 1950 | 4,464 | | 91.6% |
| 1960 | 7,949 | | 78.1% |
| 1970 | 10,214 | | 28.5% |
| 1980 | 10,646 | | 4.2% |
| 1990 | 11,485 | | 7.9% |
| 2000 | 12,533 | | 9.1% |
| 2010 | 13,598 | | 8.5% |
| 2020 | 14,575 | | 7.2% |
U.S. Decennial Census

=== Racial and ethnic composition ===
Fruitport Charter Township, Michigan – Racial and ethnic composition Note: the US Census treats Hispanic/Latino as an ethnic category. This table excludes Latinos from the racial categories and assigns them to a separate category. Hispanics/Latinos may be of any race.
| Race / Ethnicity (NH = Non-Hispanic) | Pop 2000 | Pop 2010 | Pop 2020 | % 2000 | % 2010 | % 2020 |
|---|---|---|---|---|---|---|
| White alone (NH) | 12,002 | 12,606 | 12,812 | 95.76% | 92.70% | 87.90% |
| Black or African American alone (NH) | 75 | 172 | 255 | 0.60% | 1.26% | 1.75% |
| Native American or Alaska Native alone (NH) | 87 | 83 | 100 | 0.69% | 0.61% | 0.69% |
| Asian alone (NH) | 54 | 107 | 146 | 0.43% | 0.79% | 1.00% |
| Native Hawaiian or Pacific Islander alone (NH) | 0 | 0 | 1 | 0.00% | 0.00% | 0.01% |
| Other race alone (NH) | 6 | 12 | 18 | 0.05% | 0.09% | 0.12% |
| Mixed race or Multiracial (NH) | 98 | 189 | 633 | 0.78% | 1.39% | 4.34% |
| Hispanic or Latino (any race) | 211 | 429 | 610 | 1.68% | 3.15% | 4.19% |
| Total | 12,533 | 13,598 | 14,575 | 100.00% | 100.00% | 100.00% |

=== 2000 census ===
As of the census of 2000, there were 12,533 people, 4,446 households, and 3,516 families residing in the township. The population density was 417.6 inhabitants per square mile (161.2/km^{2}). There were 4,584 housing units at an average density of 152.7 per square mile (59.0/km^{2}). The racial makeup of the township was 96.90% White, 0.65% African American, 0.70% Native American, 0.43% Asian, 0.45% from other races, and 0.86% from two or more races. Hispanic or Latino of any race were 1.68% of the population.

There were 4,446 households, out of which 37.9% had children under the age of 18 living with them, 67.2% were married couples living together, 8.1% had a female householder with no husband present, and 20.9% were non-families. 16.8% of all households were made up of individuals, and 7.2% had someone living alone who was 65 years of age or older. The average household size was 2.80 and the average family size was 3.15.

In the township the population was spread out, with 27.7% under the age of 18, 7.8% from 18 to 24, 29.7% from 25 to 44, 23.9% from 45 to 64, and 10.9% who were 65 years of age or older. The median age was 37 years. For every 100 females, there were 97.7 males. For every 100 females age 18 and over, there were 95.0 males.

The median income for a household in the township was $49,065, and the median income for a family was $54,634. Males had a median income of $40,165 versus $27,690 for females. The per capita income for the township was $20,582. About 5.4% of families and 6.6% of the population were below the poverty line, including 8.0% of those under age 18 and 4.8% of those age 65 or over.

== Education ==
Almost all of the township is served by the Fruitport Community Schools district. Fruitport High School, Fruitport Middle School, Shettler Elementary School, Beach Elementary School, and Edgewood Elementary School serve the township. A sliver in the east is part of Mona Shores Public Schools.

Also located in the township is the private Calvary Christian School.
