= Mona Shores High School =

Location
- 1121 Seminole Road; Norton Shores, Michigan 49441; United States
- Coordinates: 43°11′08″N 86°16′20″W

Information
- Type: Public secondary school
- Opened: September 4, 1962
- School district: Mona Shores Public Schools
- Superintendent: Bill O'Brien, Jr.
- Principal: Jennifer Bustard
- Teaching staff: 64.30 (on an FTE basis)
- Grades: 9-12
- Enrollment: 1,232 (2023-2024)
- Student to teacher ratio: 19.16
- Colors: Navy blue Columbia blue White
- Athletics conference: Ottawa-Kent Conference
- Nickname: Sailors
- Website: www.monashores.net/o/mshs

Mona Shores High School is a public high school in Norton Shores, Michigan, United States. It serves grades 9-12 for Mona Shores Public Schools.

== History ==
Mona Shores Public Schools was formed by merging five K-8 school districts into one K-12 district on September 14, 1959. A construction bond was passed in the spring of 1960 and Mona Shores High School opened for the 1962-63 school year.

== Academics ==
In the 2020 U.S. News & World Report annual survey of high schools, Mona Shores ranked 147th in Michigan and 4,023rd nationally.

== Demographics ==
The demographic breakdown of the 1,256 students enrolled for the 2018-19 school year was:

- Male - 50.2%
- Female - 49.8%
- Native American/Alaskan - 0.6%
- Asian - 2.8%
- Black - 11.3%
- Hispanic - 4.1%
- White - 75.7%
- Multiracial - 5.5%

44.9% of the students were eligible for free or reduced-cost lunch.

== Athletics ==
The Mona Shores Sailors compete in the Ottawa-Kent Conference. School colors are navy blue, Columbia blue and white. The following Michigan High School Athletic Association (MHSAA) sanctioned sports are offered:

- Baseball (boys)
- Basketball (girls and boys)
- Bowling (girls and boys)
- Competitive cheerleading (girls)
- Cross country (girls and boys)
- Football (boys)
  - State champion - 2019, 2020
- Golf (girls and boys)
  - Boys state champion - 1989, 1991, 2000, 2005
  - Girls state champion - 2009, 2010, 2011, 2012
- Ice hockey (boys)
  - State champion - 2000
- Lacrosse (girls and boys)
- Soccer (girls and boys)
- Softball (girls)
- Swim and dive (girls and boys)
- Tennis (girls and boys)
- Track and field (girls and boys)
- Volleyball (girls)
- Wrestling (boys)

== Arts ==
Mona Shores offers courses and co-curricular activities in band, chorus and orchestra.

The marching band competed in the Michigan Competing Band Association (MCBA). Mona Shores won MCBA state championships in 1993, 1995, 1998, 1999, 2000 and 2003.

Mona Shores High School choir puts on America's Tallest Singing Christmas Tree each year at the Frauenthal in downtown Muskegon.

== Notable alumni ==
- Justin Abdelkader - National Hockey League (NHL) left winger
- Tyree Jackson - NFL tight end for the Washington Commanders
- Tom Kauffman - Emmy Award-winning writer/producer of Rick and Morty
- JD Ryznar - Television writer of numerous shows including "The Boss Baby: Back in Business" Additionally, he coined the term "Yacht rock," which has been appropriated by major corporations.
