= Grand Haven High School =

Public school in Michigan, United States

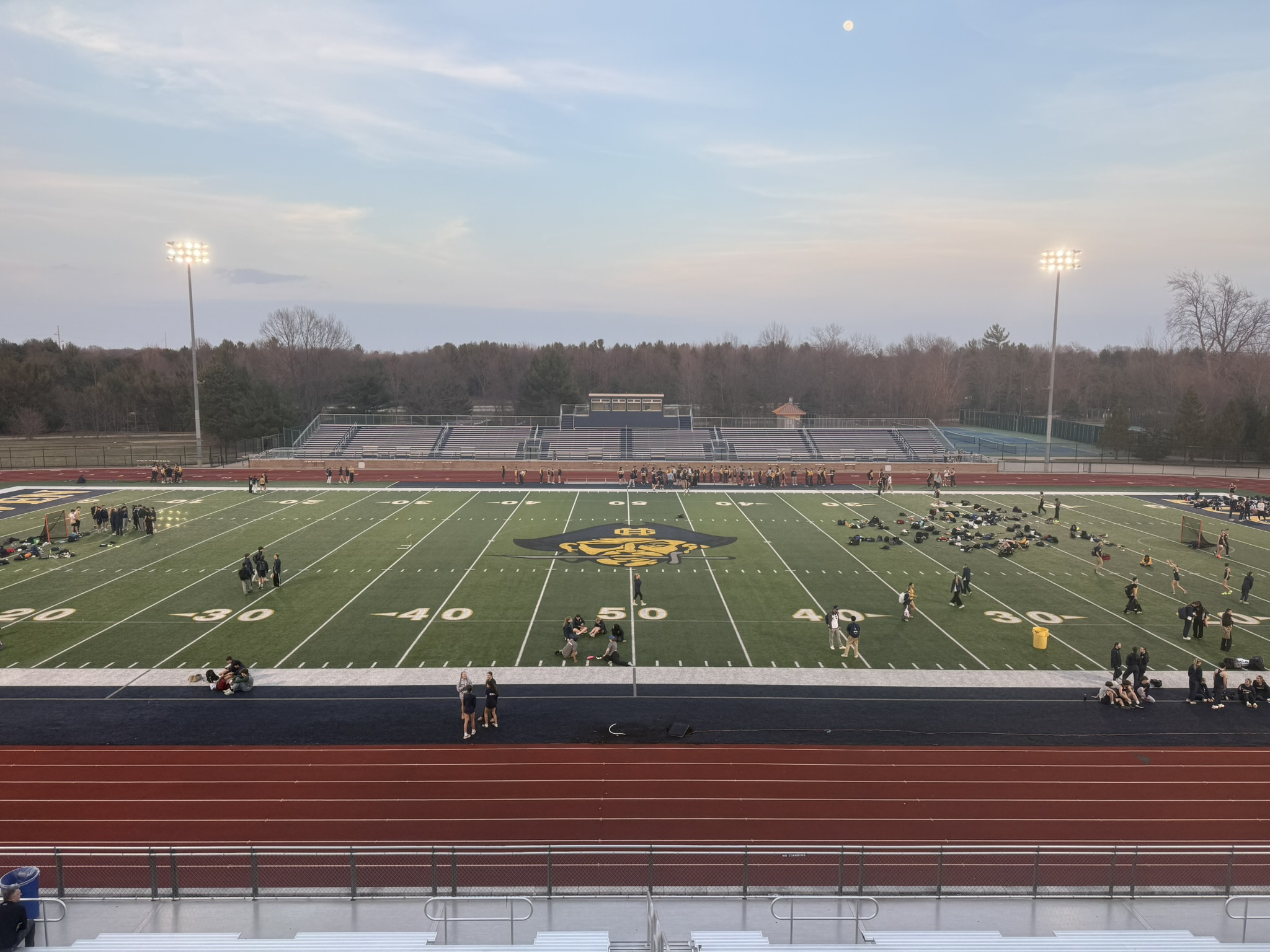

Location
- 17001 Ferris Street; Grand Haven, Michigan 49417; United States; 43°00′37.1″N 86°12′41.3″W

Information
- Type: Public secondary school
- Established: 1865; 1997 (current building)
- School district: Grand Haven Area Public Schools
- Superintendent: Kristin Perkowski
- Principal: Tracy Wilson
- Teaching staff: 94.31 (on an FTE basis)
- Grades: 9–12
- Enrollment: 1,724 (2023-2024)
- Student to teacher ratio: 18.28
- Colors: Navy blue Gold
- Athletics: MHSAA Class A; D-1
- Athletics conference: OK Conference, Red Division
- Nickname: Buccaneers
- Rival: West Ottawa High School Spring Lake High School Traverse City West Senior High School
- Newspaper: The Buc's Blade
- Yearbook: Blue & Gold
- Website: www.ghaps.org/schools/secondary-schools/ghhs/

Student assessments
- 2021–22 school year Change vs. prior year

M-STEP 11th grade proficiency rates (Science / Social Studies)
- Advanced %: 8.9 / 11.4
- Proficient %: 13.1 / 13.4
- PR. Proficient %: 8.6 / 35.2
- Not Proficient %: 69.4 / 40.1

Average test scores
- SAT Total: 1048.8 (▲ +8.3)

Grand Haven High School (GHHS) is a public secondary school in Grand Haven Charter Township, Michigan, United States (with a mailing address in the city of Grand Haven). It is the sole comprehensive high school in the Grand Haven Area Public Schools district, and one of two in northwest Ottawa County; the other being Spring Lake High School.

== Demographics ==
The demographic breakdown for the 1,781 students enrolled in 2020–21 at Grand Haven High School was:

- Male - 49.6%
- Female - 50.4%
- Native American - 0.2%
- Asian - 2.1%
- Black - 1.7%
- Hispanic - 4.6%
- Pacific Islander - 0.1%
- White - 88.9%
- Multiracial - 2.5%

In addition, 411 students (23.1%) of students were eligible for reduced-price or free lunch.

== Athletics ==
=== Grand Haven Girls Swim Team ===
The Buccaneers girls' swim team has achieved notable success in the MHSAA Division 1 state championships. In 2023, Grand Haven finished as the state runner-up overall, highlighted by a state-championship victory in the 400-yard freestyle relay swam by Genevieve Springer, Rosalee Springer, Claire Busse, and Grace Ackerman. The program has been led for over 15 years by head coach Doug Thorne, who is in his third decade of coaching overall. Following the 2023 runner-up finish, Thorne was named the MISCA Division 1 Swim Coach of the Year for the second time in three seasons. He was subsequently honored by the Michigan High School Coaches Association (MHSCA) as the overall state Swim and Dive Coach of the Year for his long-term contributions to the sport and community.

Beyond varsity team state finishes, the Grand Haven aquatics program features the Catalina Club, a synchronized swimming and water performance group founded in 1954. Operating as the largest extracurricular student club at the high school, it historically carries a roster of roughly 125 members per season. The club requires participants to pass a safety swimming metric rather than athletic cuts, drawing student performers from various segments of the student body for annual synchronized routines at the school's aquatic center.

The program has also produced individual athletes who achieved national prominence, most notably Kathryn Elaine Ackerman. Ackerman was a five-time MHSAA Division 1 individual state champion, winning three consecutive state titles in the 200-yard individual medley and two in the 100-yard backstroke. Her 2018 individual medley time set an MHSAA Division 1 state record and registered as the fastest time by a high school swimmer in the United States that fall. Named the 2020 Michigan Female High School Athlete of the Year by the Detroit Athletic Club, she later competed as an All-American for the University of Michigan and qualified for the 2021 U.S. Olympic Swimming Trials, finishing in the top 16 nationally in the 400-meter individual medley.

== Notable alumni ==
- Howard Bailey - professional baseball player
- Garrett Clark Borns - singer, songwriter, and multi-instrumentalist, known by the stage name Børns
- Jim Linderman - writer, collector, and visual artist
- John Potter - American football placekicker
- Aaron Cummings - American rugby sevens player
