= Lydia J. Newcomb Comings =

American educator, lecturer, author

Lydia Jane Newcomb Comings
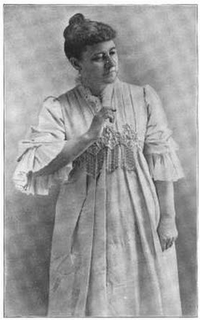
- Photo in Werner's Magazine, 1894
- Born: Lydia Jane Newcomb; July 25, 1850 – September 21, 1946; Spring Lake, Michigan, U.S.
- Died: September 21, 1946 (aged 96)
- Education: Mrs. L. H. Stone's Seminary
- Occupations: Educator, lecturer, author
- Spouse: Samuel Huntington Comings (m. 1902; died 1907)
- Writing career
- Pen name: Mrs. S. H. Comings
- Language: English
- Genre: physical education
- Notable works: Muscular Exercises for Health and Grace

Lydia J. Newcomb Comings (née, Newcomb; July 25, 1850 – September 21, 1946) was an American educator, lecturer, and author. Comings was the co-founder of the School of Organic Education, Fairhope, Alabama, 1905. She was in charge of the Normal School of Expression and Physical Culture, Moravian Seminary and Colleges for Young Women (Bethlehem, Pennsylvania); Physical Culture Department, Mt. Chautauqua, Mountain Lake Park, Maryland; and Physical Culture and Expression, Pennsylvania Chautauqua, Mount Gretna, Pennsylvania. She was the author of Muscular Exercises for Health and Grace.

== Biography ==
Lydia Jane Newcomb was born in Spring Lake, Michigan, July 25, 1850. She was the daughter of John H. and Frances (Sinclair) Newcomb. She received her education at Chicago grammar and high school and at Mrs. L. H. Stone's Seminary, in Kalamazoo, Michigan.

Comings taught at Ravenswood (Chicago) public school, 1876–85; and at the Moravian Seminary, Bethlehem, Pennsylvania, 1895-98 (elocution and physical culture). She was a lecturer on physical culture, dress, voice, and similar subjects from 1898 before lecturing on Organic Education. Comings was the founder and incorporator (with five other women) of the School of Organic Education, Fairhope, Alabama, 1907. She served as president of the Board of Trustees from its inception. This was an experimental school for both day and boarding pupils where there were no requirements for the younger pupils and but few for the older ones, where no books were used until pupils were 9 or 10 years of age, and health and individuality were preserved, and cultivated above all else.

She was the author of Muscular Exercises for Health and Grace 1893.

In Chicago, in 1902, she married Samuel Huntington Comings (died 1907). She served as president of the Fifth Thursday Club of Falrhope, since its beginning in 1904, this club being a federation of the various clubs in Falrhope. Her recreations included an eighteen-month stay In Europe, Italy, Vienna, and Germany, with a series of lectures in Naples and Rome. She was also the president of the Library Association of Falrhope. Comings favored woman suffrage.

Lydia Jane Newcomb Comings died September 21, 1946.

== Selected works ==
Industrial and vocational education, 1915

Pagan vs. Christian civilizations, 1905

- Muscular exercises for health and grace, 1893
- Pagan vs. Christian civilizations- national life and permanence dependent on reform in education. A plea for free universal industrial training on a self-supporting basis, 1905
- Industrial and vocational education, universal and self sustaining (Pagan versus Christian civilizations), By S. H. Comings. Second Edition Revision and Supplement by Mrs. S. H. (Lydia J. Newcomb) Comings, 1915
