= Aloys Bilz House =

- U.S. National Register of Historic Places
- Michigan State Historic Site
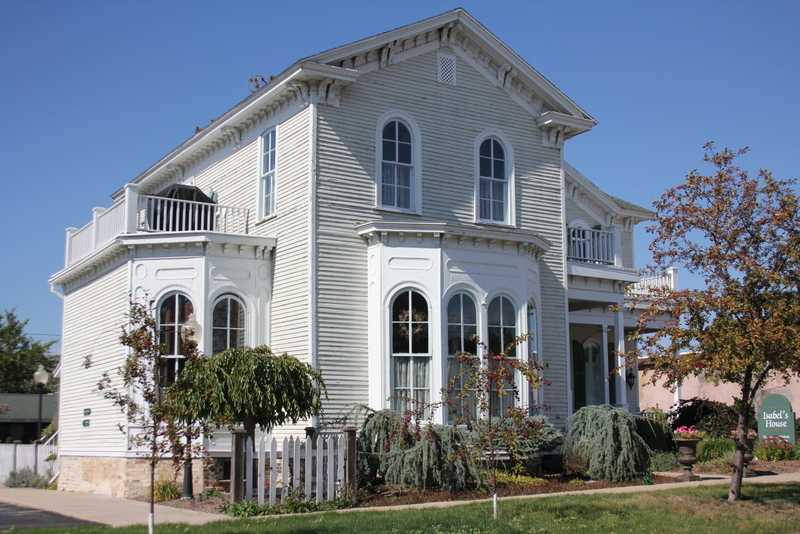

- Location within Michigan Location within the United States
- Interactive map
- Location: 107 S. Division St., Spring Lake, Michigan
- Coordinates: 43°04′34″N 86°12′03″W
- Area: less than one acre
- Built: 1872
- Architectural style: Italianate
- NRHP reference No.: 87002139
- Added to NRHP: December 14, 1987

The Aloys Bilz House is a private house located at 107 South Division Street in Spring Lake, Michigan. It was listed on the National Register of Historic Places in 1987. The house is remarkably unaltered from its original look in 1872.

== History ==
Aloys Bilz was born in 1841 in Dupplesgrun, Bohemia to Joseph and Margaret Bilz of Bavaria. In 1850, the family emigrated to Buffalo, New York. In 1854, Aloys apprenticed himself to a tinsmith, and spent the next few years learning the trade. Starting in 1857, he supervised a tin shop in New Baltimore, Michigan, where he worked until 1863. In 1864, Bilz married Mary Alice Thompson, then moved to various communities until settling in Spring Lake in 1866 and opening a tin shop and hardware business. The business was quickly profitable, and in six months, Bilz purchased this plot of land on which he built a shop and house.

However, in 1871, fire destroyed the community, including Bilz's shop and house. Following the fire, Bilz rebuilt his business, and constructed this new house on the site of his previous one. Bilz also rebuilt his business, and went on to invest in other business interests in the Spring Lake area, as well as serve as village president for ten years. He lived in the house until his death in 1934.

Bilz's son, William A. Bilz (born 1880), was also active in the community, operated his father's hardware store, and lived in the same house. He lived in the house until his death in 1940. After this, his W. Preston Bilz inherited the house and lived here until his own death in 1983.

== Description ==
The Aloys Bilz House is an L-shapes, two-story Italianate house with a gabled roof and brick foundation. It is clad with clapboard. The roofline gables have classical cornices with returns, echoing a Greek Revival style, but it has mainly Italianate details, including paired brackets under the eaves and arched window and door openings. The main entrance to the house is through a porch on the inside of the L.

On the inside, the first floor contains an entry hall with stairway, and a sitting/dining room, parlor, and master bedroom off the entry hall. A kitchen, pantry, and day room are in the rear, within a single-story extension. The second floor is smaller than the first, and contains three bedrooms and a bathroom.
