= Ferrysburg, Michigan =

- City
- City of Ferrysburg
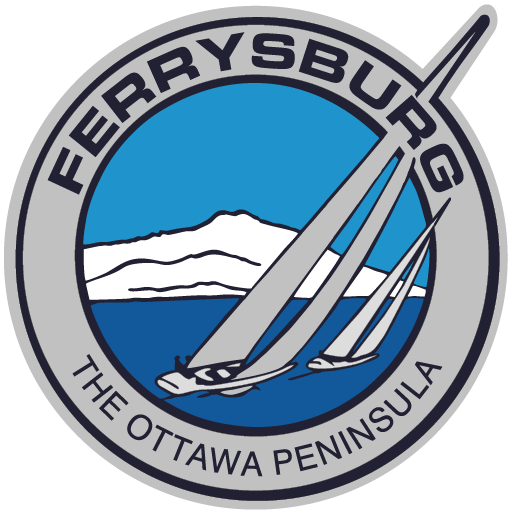
- Flag Seal
- Nicknames: The Ottawa Peninsula, A Tri-Cities Community
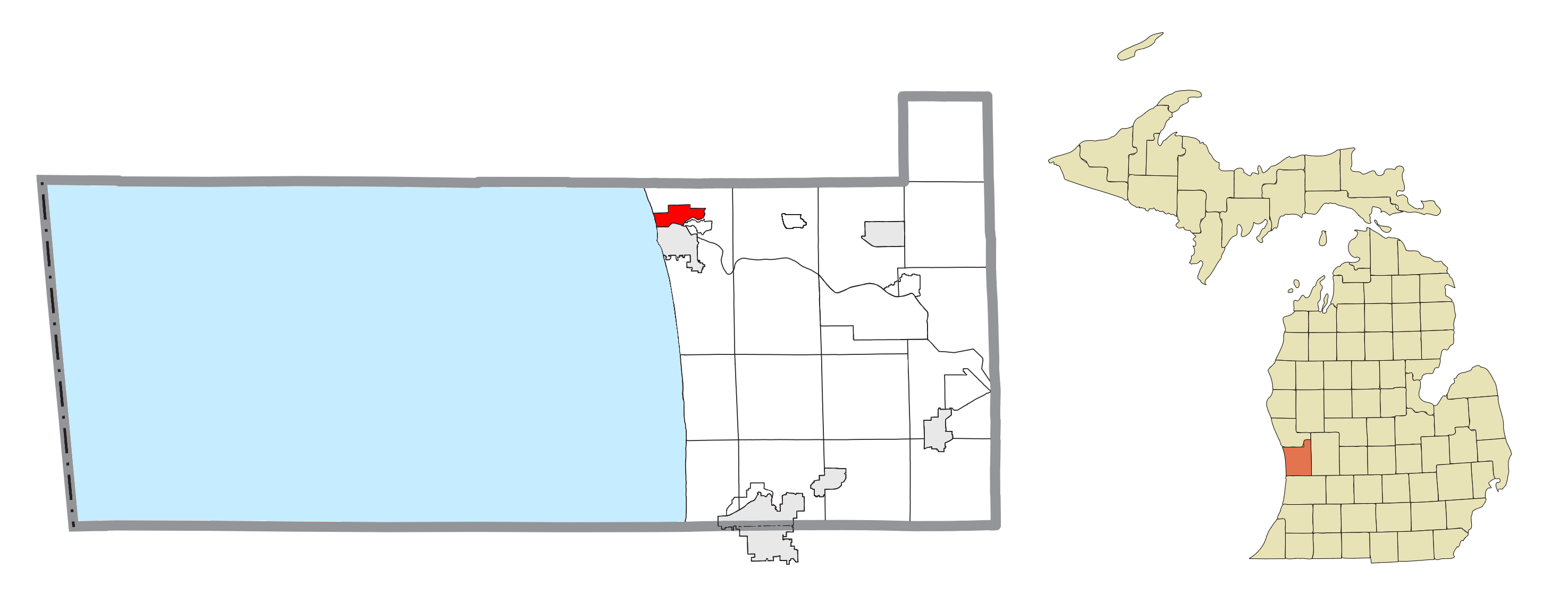
- Location within Ottawa County

- Location within the state of Michigan Location within the United States
- Coordinates: 43°06′05″N 86°13′11″W
- Country: United States
- State: Michigan
- County: Ottawa
- Settled: 1857
- Incorporated: 1963

Government
  - Type: Council–manager
  - Mayor: Richard Carlson
  - Clerk: Amber Schaner

Area
  - Total: 3.59 sq mi (9.30 km^{2})
  - Land: 2.99 sq mi (7.74 km^{2})
  - Water: 0.60 sq mi (1.55 km^{2})
- Elevation: 620 ft (190 m)

Population (2020)
  - Total: 2,952
  - Density: 987.2/sq mi (381.17/km^{2})
- Time zone: UTC-5 (EST)
  - Summer (DST): UTC-4 (EDT)
- ZIP code(s): 49409 (Ferrysburg); 49456 (Spring Lake)
- Area code: 616
- FIPS code: 26-27960
- GNIS feature ID: 0625927
- Website: Official website

Ferrysburg is a city in Ottawa County in the U.S. state of Michigan. As of the 2020 census, Ferrysburg had a population of 2,952.

It is located in the northeastern portion of Spring Lake Township, though it is administratively autonomous. The village of Spring Lake is located to the southeast, on the opposite side of Spring Lake from Ferrysburg. The city of Grand Haven is located to the south, on the opposite side of the Grand River. Lake Michigan is to the west of the city. Spring Lake's ZIP code 49456 serves most locations in Ferrysburg as well. Only a few areas have a Ferrysburg ZIP code, and the local post office provides only PO Box service.

US 31 passes north-south through the city and M-104 has its western terminus at US 31 in Ferrysburg.

== History ==
Before colonization and European settlement, the region had been inhabited by Ottawa and Potawotami peoples. Settlement in the area of Ferrysburg began in the 1830s by William Montague Ferry and his family. It was platted in 1857. Originally a village within Spring Lake Township, it incorporated as a city in 1963. Per Michigan law, it separated from Spring Lake Township. However, the two share a police department.

== Geography ==
The city is situated on the north side of the Grand River at its mouth on Lake Michigan. The harbor of Grand Haven and Spring Lake form the southern boundary of the city.

According to the United States Census Bureau, the city has a total area of 3.59 square miles (9.30 km^{2}), of which 2.99 square miles (7.74 km^{2}) is land and 0.60 square miles (1.55 km^{2}) is water.

== Demographics ==
Historical population
Census	Pop.	Note	%±
1880	411		—
1890	692		68.4%
1950	1,454		—
1960	2,590		78.1%
1970	2,196		−15.2%
1980	2,440		11.1%
1990	2,919		19.6%
2000	3,040		4.1%
2010	2,892		−4.9%
2020	2,952		2.1%
U.S. Decennial Census

=== 2020 census ===
As of the 2020 census, Ferrysburg had a population of 2,952. The median age was 52.1 years. 15.8% of residents were under the age of 18 and 28.8% of residents were 65 years of age or older. For every 100 females there were 94.1 males, and for every 100 females age 18 and over there were 91.7 males age 18 and over.

100.0% of residents lived in urban areas, while 0.0% lived in rural areas.

There were 1,353 households in Ferrysburg, of which 20.0% had children under the age of 18 living in them. Of all households, 53.7% were married-couple households, 15.6% were households with a male householder and no spouse or partner present, and 25.9% were households with a female householder and no spouse or partner present. About 31.2% of all households were made up of individuals and 13.9% had someone living alone who was 65 years of age or older.

There were 1,595 housing units, of which 15.2% were vacant. The homeowner vacancy rate was 1.1% and the rental vacancy rate was 6.1%.

Racial composition as of the 2020 census
Race	Number	Percent
White	2,697	91.4%
Black or African American	26	0.9%
American Indian and Alaska Native	23	0.8%
Asian	41	1.4%
Native Hawaiian and Other Pacific Islander	0	0.0%
Some other race	11	0.4%
Two or more races	154	5.2%
Hispanic or Latino (of any race)	87	2.9%

=== 2010 census ===
As of the census of 2010, there were 2,892 people, 1,287 households, and 809 families residing in the city. The population density was 967.2 inhabitants per square mile (373.4/km^{2}). There were 1,565 housing units at an average density of 523.4 per square mile (202.1/km^{2}). The racial makeup of the city was 95.8% White, 0.5% African American, 0.6% Native American, 0.6% Asian, 0.5% from other races, and 2.0% from two or more races. Hispanic or Latino of any race were 2.5% of the population.

There were 1,287 households, of which 24.3% had children under the age of 18 living with them, 50.4% were married couples living together, 9.7% had a female householder with no husband present, 2.7% had a male householder with no wife present, and 37.1% were non-families. 31.3% of all households were made up of individuals, and 13% had someone living alone who was 65 years of age or older. The average household size was 2.24 and the average family size was 2.79.

The median age in the city was 47.1 years. 20% of residents were under the age of 18; 6.7% were between the ages of 18 and 24; 20.2% were from 25 to 44; 33.1% were from 45 to 64; and 20% were 65 years of age or older. The gender makeup of the city was 46.5% male and 53.5% female.

=== 2000 census ===
As of the census of 2000, there were 3,040 people, 1,315 households, and 853 families residing in the city. The population density was 1,022.2 inhabitants per square mile (394.7/km^{2}). There were 1,501 housing units at an average density of 504.7 per square mile (194.9/km^{2}). The racial makeup of the city was 96.35% White, 0.59% African American, 0.76% Native American, 0.89% Asian, 0.49% from other races, and 0.92% from two or more races. Hispanic or Latino of any race were 1.28% of the population.

There were 1,315 households, out of which 27.7% had children under the age of 18 living with them, 54.0% were married couples living together, 7.5% had a female householder with no husband present, and 35.1% were non-families. 29.5% of all households were made up of individuals, and 9.0% had someone living alone who was 65 years of age or older. The average household size was 2.31 and the average family size was 2.86.

In the city, the population was spread out, with 22.7% under the age of 18, 7.3% from 18 to 24, 26.6% from 25 to 44, 29.1% from 45 to 64, and 14.2% who were 65 years of age or older. The median age was 40 years. For every 100 females, there were 95.1 males. For every 100 females age 18 and over, there were 95.5 males.

The median income for a household in the city was $53,622, and the median income for a family was $65,231. Males had a median income of $42,875 versus $27,270 for females. The per capita income for the city was $31,254. About 1.3% of families and 3.5% of the population were below the poverty line, including 2.4% of those under age 18 and none of those age 65 or over.

== Education ==
Ferrysburg is part of the Grand Haven Area Public Schools district. However, it operated a separate school district from 1857 to 1963, comprising a single school for grades K-8. High school students were sent to Grand Haven, as was the case with all high school students in Spring Lake Township at the time. In 1959, village residents voted to fully merge into the Grand Haven district. Ferrysburg's seventh and eighth graders began attending middle school in Grand Haven as well. The merger was completed in 1963. The last building to house the Ferrysburg school, built in 1954, was repurposed as an elementary school for the Grand Haven district until Lake Hills Elementary School was built just inside Spring Lake.

== Climate ==
This climatic region is typified by large seasonal temperature differences, with warm to hot (and often humid) summers and cold (sometimes severely cold) winters. According to the Köppen Climate Classification system, Ferrysburg has a humid continental climate, abbreviated "Dfb" on climate maps.
