= Fruitport Community Schools =

School district in Michigan

Address
- 3255 E. Pontaluna Rd Fruitport, Muskegon, Michigan, 49415; United States

District information
- Grades: Pre-Kindergarten-12
- Superintendent: Jason J. Kennedy
- Schools: 7
- Budget: $48,891,000 2022-2023 expenditures
- NCES District ID: 2615390

Students and staff
- Students: 2,671 (2024-2025)
- Teachers: 155 (on an FTE basis) (2024-2025)
- Staff: 361.34 FTE (2024-2025)
- Student–teacher ratio: 17.23 (2024-2025)

Other information
- Website: www.fruitportschools.net

Fruitport Community Schools is a public school district headquartered in Fruitport, Michigan and serving portions of Muskegon and Ottawa counties in West Michigan. In Muskegon County, it serves most of Fruitport Township, including its namesake village, and portions of Sullivan Township. In Ottawa County, it serves most of Crockery Township and a sliver of Spring Lake Township.

== History ==
Fruitport has had a high school since at least 1904. Operation of the high school seems to have ceased by 1930, when the district only had eight grades. A new brick school was built in Fruitport in 1931 that went to grade ten.

Fruitport's school district consolidated with other primary school districts in the area in 1947 to form the present school district. The high school was discontinued at that time.

Earlier that year, on March 25, 1947, the Rhymer schoolhouse on Carr Road burned down during the school day due to a faulty furnace. All 31 students escaped and no one was injured.

Edgewood Elementary opened in 1950. Additions were built at Fruitport Junior High School (which had opened in 1955) in 1963 to form a junior/senior high school. The reestablished high school opened in fall 1964.

Fruitport Middle School opened in 1969. The architect was VanderMeiden, Koteles Associates.

The high school was rebuilt in 2021 with a focus on security. Architecture firm Tower Pinkster built a 189,822 addition with a curved academic corridor, shatter-resistant glass, concrete wing walls and refuge zones to protect people in the event of a mass shooting.

In November of 2025, voters approved a $78.5 million bond proposal to fund several upgrades in the district. Plans include building a new Edgewood Elementary School.

== Schools ==
Schools in Fruitport Community Schools district
School	Address	Notes
Fruitport High School	357 N. Sixth Ave., Fruitport	Grades 9-12
Fruitport Middle School	3113 E. Pontaluna Rd., Fruitport	Grades 6-8
Beach Elementary School	2741 Hts. Ravenna Rd., Muskegon	Grades K-5
Edgewood Elementary School	3255 E. Pontaluna Rd., Fruitport	Grades K-5
Shettler Elementary School	2187 Shettler Rd., Muskegon	Grades K-5
Early Childhood Center	3113 E. Pontaluna Rd., Fruitport,	Preschool located within Fruitport Middle School
