= Fruitport High School =

Location
- 357 North 6th Avenue; Fruitport, Michigan 49415; United States
- Coordinates: 43°07′46″N 86°09′45″W

Information
- Type: Public high school
- School district: Fruitport Community Schools
- NCES School ID: 261539005199
- Principal: Lauren Chesney
- Teaching staff: 42.40 (FTE) (2024-2025)
- Grades: 9–12
- Enrollment: 812 (2024-2025)
- Student to teacher ratio: 19.15 (2024-2025)
- Colors: Navy Blue and White
- Athletics conference: Ottawa-Kent Conference
- Nickname: Trojans
- Website: www.fruitportschools.net/schools/fruitport-high-school

Fruitport High School is a public high school in Fruitport, Michigan, United States. It is part of the Fruitport Community Schools district.

== History ==
Additions were built to Fruitport Junior High School (which was new in 1955) in 1963 to form a junior/senior high school.

The school was rebuilt in 2021 with a focus on security. Architecture firm Tower Pinkster built a 189,822-square-foot addition with a curved academic corridor, shatter-resistant glass, concrete wing walls, and refuge zones to protect people in the event of a mass shooting.

== Academics ==
Fruitport was ranked 257th in Michigan in the 2019 U.S. News & World Report best high school rankings.

== Athletics ==
The Fruitport Trojans compete in the Ottawa-Kent Conference. The school colors are navy blue and white. The following Michigan High School Athletic Association (MHSAA) sanctioned sports are offered:

- Baseball (boys)
- Basketball (boys and girls)
- Bowling (boys and girls)
- Competitive cheer (girls)
- Cross country (boys and girls)
- Football (boys)
- Golf (boys and girls)
- Ice hockey (boys)
- Lacrosse (boys and girls)
- Soccer (boys and girls)
- Softball (girls)
- Tennis (boys and girls)
- Track and field (boys and girls)
- Volleyball (boys and girls)
  - State champion - 2005, 2010, 2011
- Wrestling (boys)

The athletic programs is known mainly for its successes in volleyball and wrestling. In volleyball, since 2001, the program has been a state finalist eight times, winning three state titles (2005, 2010, and 2011). In football the team in 2001 were state runners-up. The football program has produced Mike Teeter, who played defensive end at the University of Michigan, and in the NFL for the Minnesota Vikings and the Houston Oilers. In wrestling, the team has won two of the last three district titles, and has had a number of state qualifiers over the years, including sending six wrestlers to the state championships in 2014.

== Notable alumni ==
- Mike Teeter, NFL player
