= Spring Lake Township, Michigan =

- Civil township
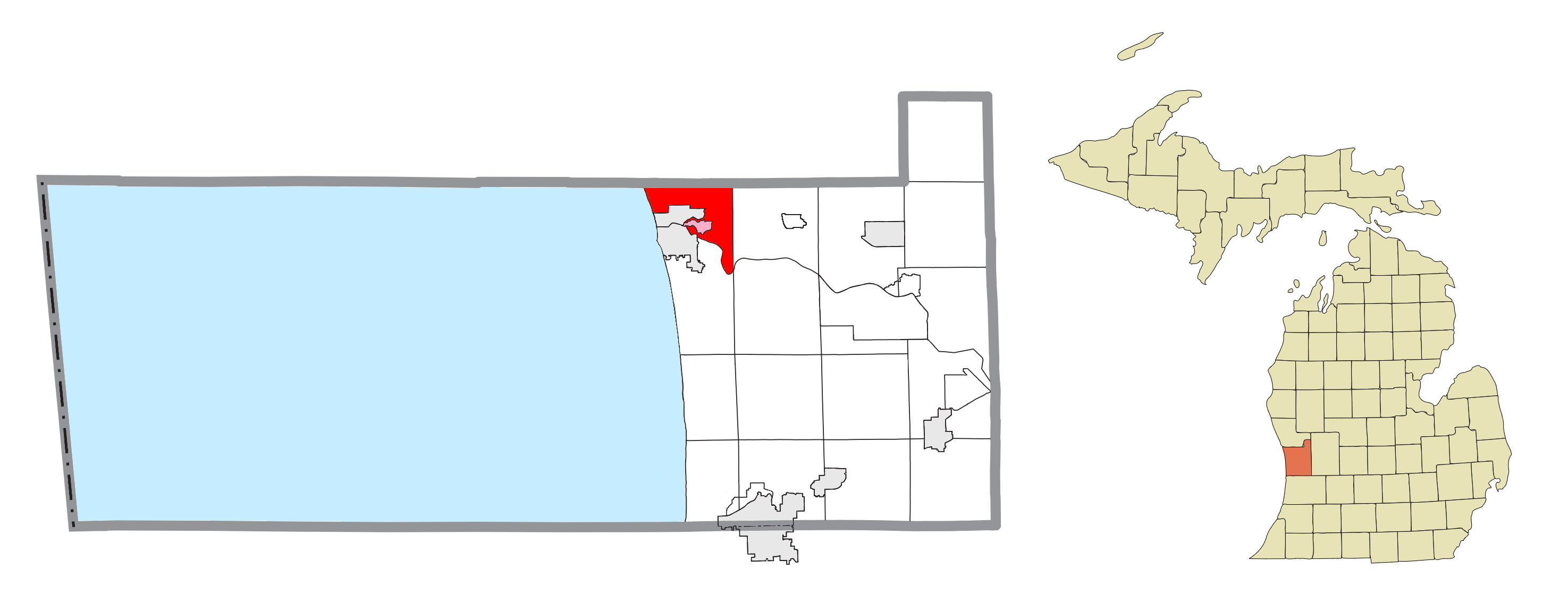
- Location within Ottawa County (red) and the administered village of Spring Lake (pink)

- Location within the state of Michigan Location within the United States
- Coordinates: 43°05′39″N 86°11′53″W
- Country: United States
- State: Michigan
- County: Ottawa
- Established: 1849

Government
  - Supervisor: Jerry Rabideau
  - Clerk: H. Carolyn Boersma

Area
  - Total: 18.73 sq mi (48.51 km^{2})
  - Land: 16.48 sq mi (42.68 km^{2})
  - Water: 2.25 sq mi (5.83 km^{2})
- Elevation: 600 ft (183 m)

Population (2020)
  - Total: 15,296
  - Density: 928.2/sq mi (358.4/km^{2})
- Time zone: UTC-5 (Eastern (EST))
  - Summer (DST): UTC-4 (EDT)
- ZIP code(s): 49456 (Spring Lake)
- Area code: 616
- FIPS code: 26-75840
- GNIS feature ID: 1627111
- Website: Official website

Spring Lake Township is a civil township of Ottawa County in the U.S. state of Michigan. The population was 15,296 according to the 2020 census, up from 14,300 according to the 2010 census. The village of Spring Lake is located within the township.

The city of Ferrysburg is south of the township bordering Lake Michigan, the Grand River and Spring Lake. On the south side of the Grand River is the city of Grand Haven and Grand Haven Charter Township. Crockery Township is to the east and Muskegon County is to the north. It was established in 1855.

== Geography ==
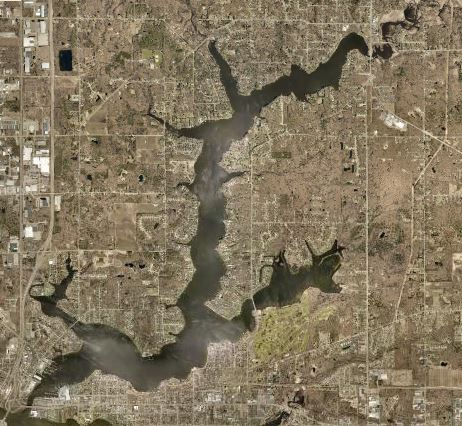
Aerial view of the lake

Within the Township of Spring Lake, is a 1,097-acre (444 ha) lake called Spring Lake. This lake is roughly 4 miles long, not including its various bayous, and ~200 feet wide before it drains into the final stretches of the Grand River.

Spring Lake separates the township into two sections: one to the north of Ferrysburg and west of Spring Lake and the other to the east of Spring Lake and north of the Grand River (and area including the village of Spring Lake). There is only one bridge across the lake, M-104, which connects the village of Spring Lake with Ferrysburg. The only other way around the lake requires going north into Muskegon County. There is also a small peninsula in the Grand River, which is part of the Grand Haven State Game Area, where the only road access involves going through Crockery Township.

According to the United States Census Bureau, the township has a total area of 20.0 square miles (52 km^{2}), of which 16.5 square miles (43 km^{2}) is land and 3.4 square miles (8.8 km^{2}) (17.09%) is water.

== Demographics ==
As of the census of 2000, there were 13,140 people, 5,237 households, and 3,650 families residing in the township. The population density was 794.8 inhabitants per square mile (306.9/km^{2}). There were 5,748 housing units at an average density of 347.7 per square mile (134.2/km^{2}). The racial makeup of the township was 97.35% White, 0.33% African American, 0.42% Native American, 0.52% Asian, 0.43% from other races, and 0.95% from two or more races. Hispanic or Latino of any race were 1.57% of the population.

There were 5,237 households, out of which 33.5% had children under the age of 18 living with them, 58.9% were married couples living together, 7.6% had a female householder with no husband present, and 30.3% were non-families. 25.7% of all households were made up of individuals, and 10.4% had someone living alone who was 65 years of age or older. The average household size was 2.46 and the average family size was 2.97.

In the township the population was spread out, with 25.3% under the age of 18, 7.0% from 18 to 24, 28.6% from 25 to 44, 24.4% from 45 to 64, and 14.6% who were 65 years of age or older. The median age was 38 years. For every 100 females, there were 93.1 males. For every 100 females age 18 and over, there were 90.3 males.

The median income for a household in the township was $50,648, and the median income for a family was $62,931. Males had a median income of $45,469 versus $28,253 for females. The per capita income for the township was $27,548. About 3.2% of families and 4.1% of the population were below the poverty line, including 3.7% of those under age 18 and 4.6% of those age 65 or over.

== Education ==
Most of the township is served by Spring Lake Public Schools. The northwest portion of the township is in Grand Haven Area Public Schools; one of the district's elementary schools, Lake Hills Elementary, is located in the township. Part of the eastern portion is in Fruitport Community Schools.
