= Jim Linderman =

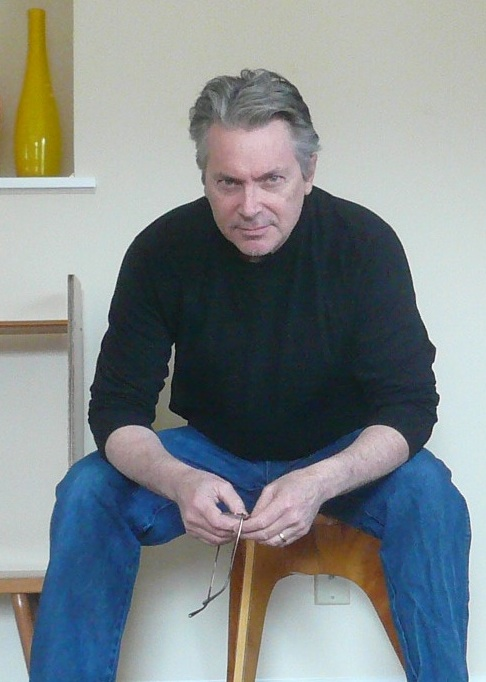
- Born: 1953 (age 72–73); Grand Rapids, Michigan, U.S.
- Education: Central Michigan University; Western Michigan University
- Occupations: Writer; collector; visual artist
- Spouse: Janna Rosenkranz

Jim Linderman (born 1953) is an American popular culture writer, collector and visual artist. Linderman has written a number of books, some self-published, has written articles for collecting magazines. He maintains three personal blogs on the subject of little-known artists and art, based on material from his collections of vintage photographs and ephemera.

== Early life and education ==
Linderman was born in Grand Rapids, Michigan. His family moved to the nearby town of Grand Haven, Michigan when he was nine years old. He was editor of his high school paper as well as a local underground magazine. As a young man he read the works of Beat writers of the 1950s and fugitive radical publications of the 1960s.

Linderman graduated Grand Haven High School in 1971; he undertook a sociology degree at Central Michigan University, graduating in 1975. Linderman obtained his master's degree in library science from Western Michigan University, graduating in 1978.

== Career ==
Linderman spent several years in Kalamazoo, Michigan working as a research librarian. He moved to New York City in 1981, and obtained a job cataloging independently produced punk rock and new wave recordings for the book VOLUME TWO: International Discography of the New Wave, published in 1982, which is in the collection of The Rock and Roll Hall of Fame. Linderman left in 1981 to work at CBS News as a librarian and researcher.

While in New York, Linderman began collecting American folk art with a particular interest in African-American self-taught art and material culture. His growing collection led to a profile and interview in Folk Art Magazine, the publication of the American Museum of Folk Art in 2005. He later published a book of vintage photographs, Arcane Americana, based on this collection.

After ten years at CBS, Linderman took a job as a researcher on the PBS and BBC collaboration “The Edge,” a culture and art show presented by Robert Krulwich. The Edge ran for one year and was not renewed. Linderman spent his final years in New York researching at the BBDO ad agency; he left Manhattan in 2005.

In about 2008 Linderman began blogging about his collections. He has been interviewed and profiled in various print publications and web sites about his collection, publications and blogs. He was the subject of a full-page profile in the New York Times in 2012

== Publications ==
Linderman has compiled more than a dozen art and photography books. In 2015 his book The Birth of Rock and Roll was included on the No Depression list of new music books worth attention.

Linderman's collection formed the basis of the album Take Me to the Water: Immersion Baptism in Vintage Music and Photography 1890-1950 and museum exhibit at New York's International Center of Photography in 2011. He was listed as "co-producer" on the publication. Linderman had spent years collecting immersion baptism photos, which came to the attention of Atlanta-based record label Dust to Digital. They paired up 75 photographs from Linderman's collection with vintage recordings of baptism themed songs. The resulting book and CD were nominated for a Grammy in the best historical release category. The original photographs were subsequently donated to the International Center of Photography.

Linderman writes three blogs. “Dull Tool Dim Bulb” is an art blog that corresponds mainly to photography, books and various antiquated curiosities. “Vintage Sleaze” which Linderman describes as a “smut market,” deals with 50s and 60s era hypocrisy, often profiling forgotten artists and purveyors of soft-core erotica and “Old Time Religion,” is focused on old time religious artifacts. Linderman uses these blogs to describe items from his collection and to put them into historical and cultural context.

Linderman has written a number of articles for collecting magazines, including Paraphilia and Collectors Weekly.

== Personal ==
Linderman resides with his wife, adjunct instructor Janna Rosenkranz.

== Bibliography ==
- Volume Two: The International Discography of the New Wave. B. George and Martha DeFoe with Henry Beck, Nancy Breslow and Jim Linderman. One Ten Records / Omnibus Press (UK), 1982. ISBN 0-7119-0050-7
- Proto-Porn: The Art Figure Study Scam of the 1950s, Published by Blurb, May 8, 2012.
- I'M WITH DUMMY Vent Figures and Blockheads, Published by Blurb, May 5, 2012.
- Vintage Photographs of Arcane Americana The Jim Linderman Collection, Published by Blurb, December 16, 2011.
- Secret History of the Black Pin Up, Published by Blurb, September 16, 2011.
- The Horrible Handmade Postcards of Anonymous, Published by Blurb, August 6, 2011.
- old-time-religion, Published by Blurb, March 28, 2011.
- SMUT BY MAIL, Published by Blurb, February 1, 2011.
- The Thousand Dollar Book, Published by Blurb, December 19, 2010.
- The Painted Backdrop, Published by Blurb, May 25, 2010.
- American Portraits, Published by Blurb, April 6, 2010.
- Camera Club Girls, Published by Blurb, March 29, 2010.
- In Situ: American Folk Art in Place, Published by Blurb, February 19, 2010.
- Gals Gams Garters, Published by Blurb, November 22, 2009.
- Shy Shamed Secret Shadowed Hidden, Published by Blurb, November 9, 2009.
- TAKE ME TO THE WATER: IMMERSION BAPTISM IN VINTAGE MUSIC AND PHOTOGRAPHY 1890-1950, Photographs from the Jim Linderman collection with a CD of historic early recordings. 96 Page Hardcover with Dust Jacket. Produced by Steven Lance Ledbetter. Essays by Jim Linderman and Luc Sante. Published 2009 by Dust to Digital.
- The Birth of Rock and Roll, 2015. Dust-to Digital
