= Fruitport, Michigan =

- Village
- Location in Muskegon County and the state of Michigan
- Coordinates: 43°7′55″N 86°9′17″W
- Country: United States
- State: Michigan
- County: Muskegon
- Township: Fruitport

Area
  - Total: 1.02 sq mi (2.63 km^{2})
  - Land: 0.91 sq mi (2.35 km^{2})
  - Water: 0.11 sq mi (0.28 km^{2})
- Elevation: 627 ft (191 m)

Population (2020)
  - Total: 1,103
  - Density: 1,215.4/sq mi (469.28/km^{2})
- Time zone: UTC-5 (Eastern (EST))
  - Summer (DST): UTC-4 (EDT)
- ZIP code: 49415
- Area code: 231
- FIPS code: 26-31000
- GNIS feature ID: 0626541
- Website: fruitportvillage.com

Fruitport is a village in Muskegon County in the U.S. state of Michigan. The population was 1,103 at the 2020 census. The community is located within Fruitport Charter Township.

Water and sewer utilities are provided by Fruitport Charter Township.

== History ==
Fruitport was founded by Edward L. Craw in 1868, who platted and named it "Crawville". It was renamed "Fruitport" a year later when the Pere Marquette Railroad built a station there, as the town was in the middle of a fertile fruit-growing area and also a port. It incorporated as a village in 1891.

In an election on November 8, 2005, 306 residents voted unsuccessfully to dissolve the village municipal corporation, while 155 voted no, short of the two-thirds majority (308 votes) needed to dissolve the village. This was the fourth time since 1979 that a proposal to dissolve the village was on the ballot for an election. In 1990, a proposal to disincorporate was defeated by a 2 to 1 margin while a proposal in 1998 failed by 41 votes.

== Geography ==
The village is in southern Muskegon County, in the southern part of Fruitport Charter Township. It is bordered to the south by Ottawa County. The city of Muskegon is 10 miles (16 km) to the northwest, while Grand Haven is 8 miles (13 km) to the southwest. Fruitport sits at the upstream end of Spring Lake, connected to Lake Michigan via the Grand River at Grand Haven.

According to the U.S. Census Bureau, the village has a total area of 1.02 square miles (2.64 km^{2}), of which 0.91 square miles (2.36 km^{2}) are land and 0.11 square miles (0.28 km^{2}), or 10.8%, are water.

== Demographics ==
Historical population
Census	Pop.	Note	%±
1880	353		—
1900	311		—
1910	330		6.1%
1920	321		−2.7%
1930	379		18.1%
1940	458		20.8%
1950	638		39.3%
1960	1,037		62.5%
1970	1,409		35.9%
1980	1,143		−18.9%
1990	1,090		−4.6%
2000	1,124		3.1%
2010	1,093		−2.8%
2020	1,103		0.9%
U.S. Decennial Census

=== 2010 census ===
As of the census of 2010, there were 1,093 people, 440 households, and 312 families residing in the village. The population density was 1,201.1 inhabitants per square mile (463.7/km^{2}). There were 476 housing units at an average density of 523.1 per square mile (202.0/km^{2}). The racial makeup of the village was 95.8% White, 1.5% African American, 0.2% Native American, 0.4% Asian, 1.1% from other races, and 1.1% from two or more races. Hispanic or Latino of any race were 2.0% of the population.

There were 440 households, of which 31.6% had children under the age of 18 living with them, 55.9% were married couples living together, 10.2% had a female householder with no husband present, 4.8% had a male householder with no wife present, and 29.1% were non-families. 23.0% of all households were made up of individuals, and 10.7% had someone living alone who was 65 years of age or older. The average household size was 2.48 and the average family size was 2.91.

The median age in the village was 43.6 years. 22.5% of residents were under the age of 18; 6.1% were between the ages of 18 and 24; 23.5% were from 25 to 44; 31.6% were from 45 to 64; and 16.3% were 65 years of age or older. The gender makeup of the village was 50.2% male and 49.8% female.

=== 2000 census ===
As of the census of 2000, there were 1,124 people, 439 households, and 315 families residing in the village. The population density was 1,197.8 inhabitants per square mile (462.5/km^{2}). There were 467 housing units at an average density of 497.7 per square mile (192.2/km^{2}). The racial makeup of the village was 98.04% White, 0.09% African American, 0.44% Native American, 0.62% Asian, 0.27% from other races, and 0.53% from two or more races. Hispanic or Latino of any race were 1.42% of the population.

There were 439 households, out of which 30.5% had children under the age of 18 living with them, 59.9% were married couples living together, 8.2% had a female householder with no husband present, and 28.2% were non-families. 24.1% of all households were made up of individuals, and 9.8% had someone living alone who was 65 years of age or older. The average household size was 2.55 and the average family size was 3.03.

In the village, the population was spread out, with 24.6% under the age of 18, 7.7% from 18 to 24, 28.8% from 25 to 44, 25.2% from 45 to 64, and 13.7% who were 65 years of age or older. The median age was 38 years. For every 100 females, there were 100.4 males. For every 100 females age 18 and over, there were 94.1 males.

The median income for a household in the village was $48,125, and the median income for a family was $54,917. Males had a median income of $38,362 versus $30,227 for females. The per capita income for the village was $22,364. About 3.3% of families and 5.8% of the population were below the poverty line, including 6.8% of those under age 18 and none of those age 65 or over.

== Education ==
The village is located in the Fruitport Community Schools district, which also serves Fruitport Charter Township. Fruitport High School, Fruitport Middle School, and Edgewood Elementary School serve the village. Also located near the village is the private Calvary Christian School.

== Climate ==
This climatic region is typified by large seasonal temperature differences, with warm to hot (and often humid) summers and cold (sometimes severely cold) winters. According to the Köppen Climate Classification system, Fruitport has a humid continental climate, abbreviated "Dfb" on climate maps.
