= Spring Lake, Michigan =

- Village
- Village of Spring Lake
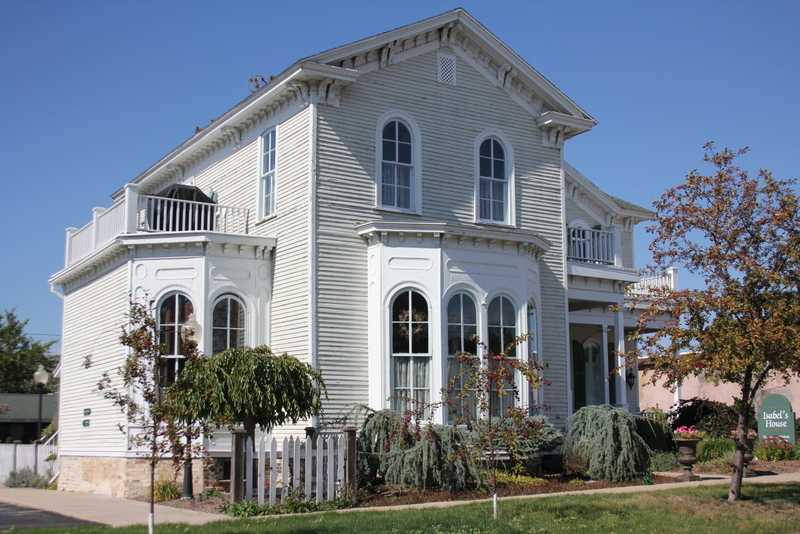
- The historic Aloys Bilz House in Spring Lake

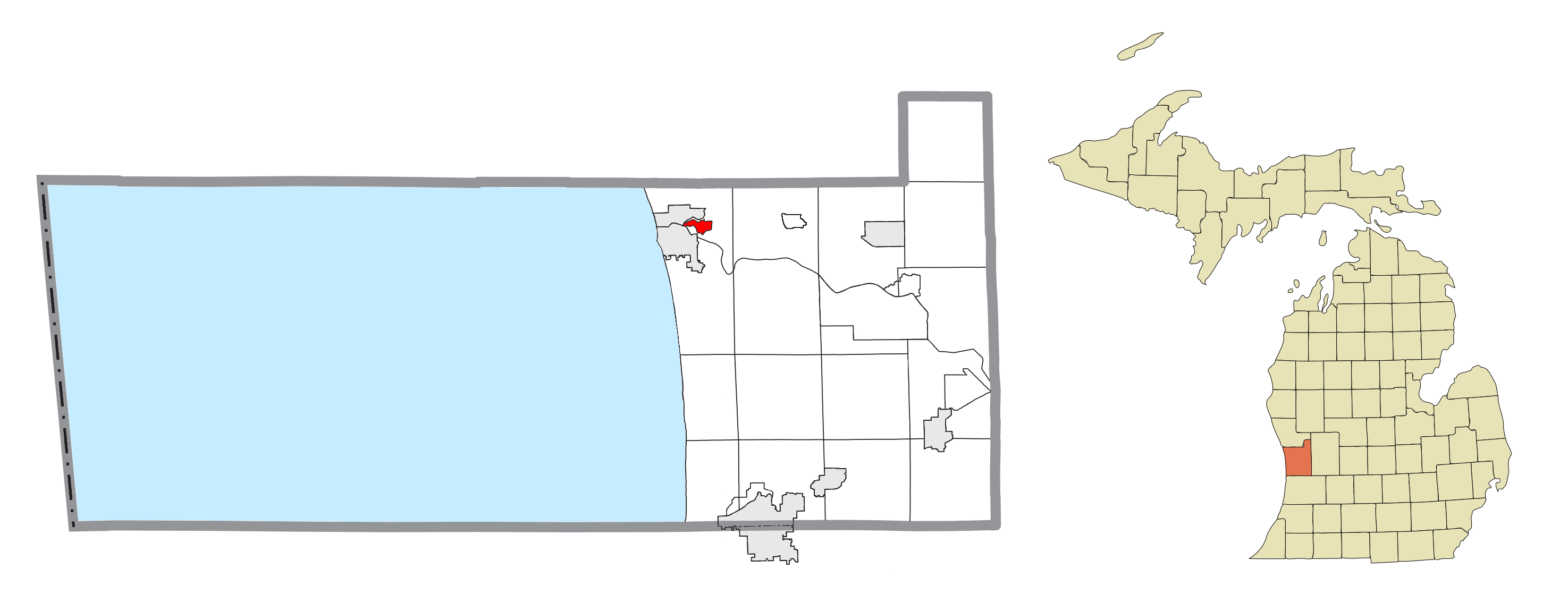
- Location within Ottawa County

- Location within the state of Michigan Location within the United States
- Coordinates: 43°4′37″N 86°11′49″W
- Country: United States
- State: Michigan
- County: Ottawa
- Township: Spring Lake
- Settled: 1837
- Incorporated: 1869

Government
  - Type: Village council
  - President: Mark Powers
  - Clerk: Marv Hinga

Area
  - Total: 1.92 sq mi (4.96 km^{2})
  - Land: 1.25 sq mi (3.24 km^{2})
  - Water: 0.66 sq mi (1.72 km^{2})
- Elevation: 597 ft (182 m)

Population (2020)
  - Total: 2,497
  - Density: 1,997.6/sq mi (771.3/km^{2})
- Time zone: UTC-5 (Eastern (EST))
  - Summer (DST): UTC-4 (EDT)
- ZIP code(s): 49456
- Area code: 616
- FIPS code: 26-75820
- GNIS feature ID: 0638599
- Website: Official website

Spring Lake is a village in Ottawa County in the U.S. state of Michigan. The population was 2,497 at the 2020 census. The village is located within Spring Lake Township. The two share a ZIP code, which also serves most of the neighboring city of Ferrysburg and slivers of Crockery Township in Ottawa County and Fruitport Township and the city of Norton Shores in Muskegon County.

== History ==
In 1837, Captain Benjamin Hopkins purchased land in the area and built a mill. The place became known as "Hopkins Mill". In 1849, Thomas W. White and S.C. Hopkins recorded a plat with the name "Mill Point". A post office was established with that name in May 1851. In May 1867, the post office was renamed "Spring Lake", which was also the name of a station on the Detroit, Grand Haven and Milwaukee Railway (later part of the Grand Trunk Western Railroad). The Village of Spring Lake was incorporated in 1869. The post office continues to operate, with ZIP code 49456.

== Geography ==
According to the United States Census Bureau, the village has a total area of 1.74 square miles (4.51 km^{2}), of which 1.18 square miles (3.06 km^{2}) is land and 0.56 square miles (1.45 km^{2}) is water.

== Demographics ==
Historical population
Census	Pop.	Note	%±
1860	179		—
1870	1,156		545.8%
1880	1,372		18.7%
1890	1,168		−14.9%
1900	696		−40.4%
1910	802		15.2%
1920	978		21.9%
1930	1,271		30.0%
1940	1,329		4.6%
1950	1,824		37.2%
1960	2,063		13.1%
1970	3,034		47.1%
1980	2,731		−10.0%
1990	2,537		−7.1%
2000	2,514		−0.9%
2010	2,323		−7.6%
2020	2,497		7.5%
U.S. Decennial Census

=== 2020 census ===
As of the 2020 census, Spring Lake had a population of 2,497. The median age was 50.2 years. 18.6% of residents were under the age of 18 and 27.9% of residents were 65 years of age or older. For every 100 females there were 88.3 males, and for every 100 females age 18 and over there were 83.9 males age 18 and over.

100.0% of residents lived in urban areas, while 0.0% lived in rural areas.

There were 1,173 households in Spring Lake, of which 22.4% had children under the age of 18 living in them. Of all households, 48.7% were married-couple households, 14.5% were households with a male householder and no spouse or partner present, and 32.5% were households with a female householder and no spouse or partner present. About 36.0% of all households were made up of individuals and 22.9% had someone living alone who was 65 years of age or older.

There were 1,354 housing units, of which 13.4% were vacant. The homeowner vacancy rate was 2.0% and the rental vacancy rate was 5.6%.

Racial composition as of the 2020 census
Race	Number	Percent
White	2,356	94.4%
Black or African American	14	0.6%
American Indian and Alaska Native	3	0.1%
Asian	17	0.7%
Native Hawaiian and Other Pacific Islander	0	0.0%
Some other race	10	0.4%
Two or more races	97	3.9%
Hispanic or Latino (of any race)	47	1.9%

=== 2010 census ===
As of the census of 2010, there were 2,390 people, 1,107 households, and 963 families living in the village. The population density was 1,968.6 inhabitants per square mile (760.1/km^{2}). There were 1,301 housing units at an average density of 1,102.5 per square mile (425.7/km^{2}). The racial makeup of the village was 96% White, 3% African American, 0.2% Native American, 0.3% Asian, 0.1% Pacific Islander, 0.6% from other races, and 1.3% from two or more races. Hispanic or Latino of any race were 1.8% of the population.

There were 1,067 households, of which 25.8% had children under the age of 18 living with them, 48.5% were married couples living together, 8.3% had a female householder with no husband present, 2.7% had a male householder with no wife present, and 40.5% were non-families. 36.1% of all households were made up of individuals, and 17.6% had someone living alone who was 65 years of age or older. The average household size was 2.17 and the average family size was 2.84.

The median age in the village was 44.8 years. 21.6% of residents were under the age of 18; 6.3% were between the ages of 18 and 24; 22.5% were from 25 to 44; 29.1% were from 45 to 64; and 20.5% were 65 years of age or older. The gender makeup of the village was 47.0% male and 53.0% female.

=== 2000 census ===
As of the census of 2000, there were 2,514 people, 1,098 households, and 666 families living in the village. The population density was 2,372.4 inhabitants per square mile (916.0/km^{2}). There were 1,248 housing units at an average density of 1,177.7 per square mile (454.7/km^{2}). The racial makeup of the village was 98.05% White, 0.32% African American, 0.44% Native American, 0.24% Asian, 0.36% from other races, and 0.60% from two or more races. Hispanic or Latino of any race were 1.31% of the population.

There were 1,098 households, out of which 25.3% had children under the age of 18 living with them, 50.5% were married couples living together, 7.6% had a female householder with no husband present, and 39.3% were non-families. 36.0% of all households were made up of individuals, and 17.7% had someone living alone who was 65 years of age or older. The average household size was 2.16 and the average family size was 2.84.

In the village, the population was spread out, with 20.7% under the age of 18, 5.2% from 18 to 24, 25.7% from 25 to 44, 21.9% from 45 to 64, and 26.5% who were 65 years of age or older. The median age was 44 years. For every 100 females, there were 84.2 males. For every 100 females age 18 and over, there were 79.2 males.

The median income for a household in the village was $37,889, and the median income for a family was $44,797. Males had a median income of $34,293 versus $23,986 for females. The per capita income for the village was $26,372. About 4.6% of families and 6.1% of the population were below the poverty line, including 6.8% of those under age 18 and 4.2% of those age 65 or over.

== Education ==
K–12 public education is provided by the Spring Lake Public School District, which includes Spring Lake High School.

== Notable people ==
- Charles A. Boyle (1907–1959), member of the U.S. House of Representatives
- Joel DeLass, soccer coach and player
- Lydia J. Newcomb Comings (1850–1946), educator, lecturer, author
- Winsor McCay, cartoonist and animator known for Little Nemo in Slumberland and Gertie the Dinosaur
- Kate Reinders, actress and singer known for High School Musical: The Musical: The Series and Something Rotten!
- Andrew Rowe, ice hockey player
- Jack Sprague, NASCAR driver
- Orion Story, drag queen
