= Grand Haven Area Public Schools =

School district in Michigan

Address
- 1415 Beachtree St. Grand Haven, Ottawa, Michigan, 49417; United States

District information
- Type: Public
- Grades: Pre-kindergarten through 12
- Superintendent: Kristin M. Perkowski
- Schools: 13
- Budget: $92,720,000 (2022-2023 expeditures)
- NCES District ID: 2616380

Students and staff
- Students: 5,202 (2024-2025)
- Teachers: 336.9 FTE (2024-2025)
- Staff: 853.44 FTE (2024-2025)
- Student–teacher ratio: 15.44 (2024-2025)

Other information
- Website: www.ghaps.org

Grand Haven Area Public Schools is a school district headquartered in Grand Haven, Michigan and covering portions of northwest Ottawa County, as well as a sliver of Muskegon County. In Ottawa County, it serves all of the cities of Grand Haven and Ferrysburg, as well as all of Grand Haven Charter Township, most of Robinson Township (except for the southeast, which is zoned to Zeeland Public Schools), the northwest corner of Spring Lake Township, and the northwest corner of Port Sheldon Township. It also includes a small portion of the southernmost area of the city of Norton Shores located in Muskegon County.

== History ==
The present Grand Haven High School building opened in fall 1997. It was designed by GMB Architects.

The former high school, at 900 South Cutler Street, was dedicated in January 1954. It included a swimming pool in which the water was changed every six hours, a rifle range, and a basement recreation room with ping pong and card tables. The architect was Warren S. Holmes Co. When the present high school was built, it became Lakeshore Middle School.

== Schools ==
Schools in Grand Haven Area Public Schools
School	Address	Notes
Duneside Discovery Center at Mary A. White	1400 Wisconsin St., Grand Haven	Preschool - PreK
Ferry Elementary	1050 Pennoyer Ave., Grand Haven	Grades K - 4
Griffin Elementary	1700 S. Griffin, Grand Haven	Grades K - 4
Lake Hills Elementary	18181 Dogwood Dr., Spring Lake	Grades K - 4
Peach Plains Elementary	15849 Comstock, Grand Haven	Grades K - 4
Robinson Elementary	11801 120th Ave., Grand Haven	Grades K - 4
Rosy Mound Elementary	14016 Lakeshore Dr., Grand Haven	Grades K - 4
White Pines Intermediate School	1400 S. Griffin, Grand Haven	Grades 5 - 6
Lakeshore Middle School	900 S. Cutler, Grand Haven	Grades 7 - 8
Central High School	106 S. Sixth St., Grand Haven	Alternative High School
Grand Haven High School	17001 Ferris St., Grand Haven	Grades 9 - 12
