= List of Michigan State Historic Sites in Muskegon County =

Location of Muskegon County in Michigan

The following is a list of Michigan State Historic Sites in Muskegon County, Michigan. Sites marked with a dagger (†) are also listed on the National Register of Historic Places in Muskegon County, Michigan.

== Current listings ==
Name	Image	Location	City	Listing date
Bluffton Actors Colony / Buster Keaton Commemorative Designation		3428 Lakeshore Drive	Muskegon	September 4, 1997
Central United Methodist Church		1011 Second Street	Muskegon	May 18, 1989
Duquette-Carlson Market		585 Clay	Muskegon	January 27, 1983
Evergreen Cemetery		Bounded by Grand, Wood, Pine, and Irvin streets	Muskegon	August 21, 1986
Ferry Memorial Church		8637 Old Channel Trail	Montague	August 21, 1987
Fruitland District No. 6 School		6227 South Shore Road	Whitehall vicinity	April 18, 1991
Hackley Public Library		316 West Webster	Muskegon	February 15, 1990
Hackley House† / Charles H. Hackley		484 West Webster Avenue	Muskegon	April 24, 1970
Hackley-Holt House		523 West Clay Avenue	Muskegon	February 15, 1990
Horatio N. Hovey House†		318 Houston Ave	Muskegon	July 20, 1982
Hume House†		472 West Webster Avenue	Muskegon	August 13, 1971
Jean Baptiste Recollect Trading Post Informational Site		310 Ruddiman Road	North Muskegon	August 3, 1979
Lakeside Informational Site		1723 Lakeshore Drive	Muskegon	August 18, 2004
Lebanon Lutheran Church (also known as the Swedish Evangelical Lutheran Lebanon Church of Whitehall)		1101 South Mears Avenue	Whitehall	February 10, 1983
Lumbering on White Lake Informational Designation	Lumbering on White Lake	310 Thompson Street	Whitehall	August 8, 2006
Michigan Theater Building		407 West Western Avenue	Muskegon	April 4, 1978
Mouth Cemetery		6666 Sunset Lane	Montague vicinity	November 1, 1988
Muskegon Historic District†		Bounded roughly by Clay, Muskegon, Second, and Sixth streets	Muskegon	October 29, 1971
Muskegon Log Booming Company Informational Site	Muskegon Log Booming Co	44 Ottawa Street	Muskegon	August 23, 1956
Muskegon Woman's Club		280 Webster Avenue	Muskegon	September 3, 1998
Muskegon State Park	Muskegon State Park - Blockhouse	462 North Scenic Drive	Muskegon	July 26, 2009
Old Indian Cemetery		351 Morris Avenue	Muskegon	June 13, 1961
Pinchtown Informational Designation	Pinchtown	1543 Lake Shore Drive	Muskegon	April 11, 1991
Lafayette G. Ripley House		8543 Old Channel Trail	Montague	January 27, 1983
Staples and Covell Mill Informational Designation	Staples and Covell Mill	310 Thompson St.	Whitehall	August 8, 2006
Ruth Thompson Commemorative Designation		City Hall, 405 East Colby Street	Whitehall	September 23, 1993
Torrent House		315 West Webster	Muskegon	June 19, 1971
Twin Lake Methodist Church	Twin Lake Methodist Church	5940 Main St.	Twin Lake	March 11, 2012
Union Depot†		610 Western Avenue	Muskegon	May 17, 1978
Whipple's Castle	Whipples Castle	495 North Main	Casnovia	February 22, 1974
White Lake Yacht Club	White Lake Yacht Club	6770 S. Shore Dr.	Whitehall	August 8, 2006

== See also ==
- National Register of Historic Places listings in Muskegon County, Michigan

== Sources ==
- Historic Sites Online – Muskegon County. Michigan State Housing Developmental Authority. Accessed May 19, 2011.
