= Montague Area Public Schools =

School district in Michigan, United States

Address
- 4882 Stanton Boulevard Montague, Muskegon County, Michigan, 49437; United States

District information
- Motto: Education in the right direction.
- Grades: Pre-Kindergarten-12
- Superintendent: Jeffrey W. Johnson
- Schools: 4
- Budget: $23,893,000 2022-2023 expenditures
- NCES District ID: 2624180

Students and staff
- Students: 1,290 (2024-2025)
- Teachers: 80.92 (on an FTE basis) (2024-2025)
- Staff: 182.86 FTE (2024-2025)
- Student–teacher ratio: 15.94 (2024-2025)

Other information
- Website: www.mapsk12.org

Montague Area Public Schools is a public school district in West Michigan. In Muskegon County, it serves Montague, Montague Township, and White River Township. In Oceana County, it serves part of Rothbury and parts of the townships of Claybanks, Grant, and Otto.

== History ==
The first school within the district's boundaries was the Mouth School, established in 1849 close to the shore of Lake Michigan near the mouth of White Lake. A succession of wooden buildings were constructed (many of them burned) until a modern brick school was built in 1957. It housed all grades up to eight until 1967, when the Mouth school district consolidated with Montague's school district. It then became an elementary school. In 1981, the district voted to close the school and it was sold in 1988.

Oehrli Elementary was built in 1921 as the Montague district's only school. It replaced an older central school, built in 1875 on the same site, which burned on November 12, 1919. It was named after Raymond Robert “Jack” Oehrli, a long-serving district superintendent, in 1985.

The current high school opened in fall 1956.

Besides the Mouth school district consolidation, the district also consolidated with the Rothbury district around the same time. In fall 1968, the district was reported to have 1,950 students across five buildings: the high school, middle school, and Oehrli Elementary, Mouth Elementary, and Rothbury Elementary. In 1981, a time of financial hardship for the district, the school board voted to close Mouth and Rothbury Elementaries.

Montague Area Early Childhood Center opened in fall 2011. Voters approved a $12.73 million bond issue for additions and improvements to facilities in 2022.

== Schools ==
Schools in Montague Area Public Schools
School	Address	Notes
Montague High School	4900 Stanton Blvd., Montague	Grades 9–12. Built 1956.
Nellie B. Chisholm Middle School	4700 Stanton Blvd., Montague	Grades 6–8
R.R. Oehrli Elementary School	4859 Knudsen Street, Montague	Grades 1–5. Built 1921.
Montague Area Childhood Center	9151 Dicey St., Montague	Grades PreK-K. Built 2011.
