= Blue Lake Township, Muskegon County, Michigan =

Blue Lake Township, Michigan
- Township
- Location within Michigan Location within the United States
- Coordinates: 43°25′42″N 86°13′08″W
- Country: United States
- State: Michigan
- County: Muskegon

Area
  - Total: 35.74 sq mi (92.6 km^{2})
  - Land: 33.56 sq mi (86.9 km^{2})
  - Water: 2.18 sq mi (5.6 km^{2})
- Elevation: 604 ft (184 m)

Population (2020)
  - Total: 2,416
  - Density: 72/sq mi (28/km^{2})
- Time zone: UTC-5 (Eastern (EST))
  - Summer (DST): UTC-4 (EDT)
- ZIP Codes: 49457 (Twin Lake); 49461 (Whitehall); 49425 (Holton); 49437 (Montague)
- FIPS code: 26-121-09340
- GNIS feature ID: 1625956
- Website: www.bluelaketownship.org

Blue Lake Township is a civil township of Muskegon County in the U.S. state of Michigan. As of the 2020 census, the township population was 2,416. One of the largest landowners in the township is the Pathway to Adventure Council of the Boy Scouts of America, which owns Owasippe Scout Reservation. The township is also home to the Blue Lake Fine Arts Camp.

== History ==
Blue Lake Township was organized in 1865.

== Geography ==
The township is in northern Muskegon County, bordered to the north by Oceana County. The township center is 7 miles (11 km) by road northeast of Whitehall and 16 miles (26 km) north of Muskegon, the county seat.

According to the U.S. Census Bureau, the township has a total area of 35.7 square miles (92 km^{2}), of which 33.6 square miles (87 km^{2}) are land and 2.2 square miles (5.7 km^{2}), or 6.11%, are water. There are dozens of natural lakes in the township, the largest being Big Blue Lake in the north. The White River, a tributary of Lake Michigan, crosses the northwest part of the township.

== Demographics ==
Historical population
Census	Pop.	Note	%±
1870	381		—
1880	307		−19.4%
1890	138		−55.0%
1900	149		8.0%
1910	143		−4.0%
1920	114		−20.3%
1930	112		−1.8%
1940	189		68.8%
1950	221		16.9%
1960	769		248.0%
1970	715		−7.0%
1980	1,101		54.0%
1990	1,235		12.2%
2000	1,990		61.1%
2010	2,399		20.6%
2020	2,416		0.7%
U.S. Decennial Census

As of the census of 2010, there were 2,399 people, 822 households, and 665 families residing in the township. The population density was 66.634 per square mile. There were 975 housing units at an average density of 27.08 per square mile. The racial makeup of the township was 90.2% White, 3.0% African American, 2.4% Native American, 0.50% Asian, 0.3% from other races, and 2.71% from two or more races. Hispanic or Latino of any race were 2.6% of the population.

There were 822 households, out of which 37.1% had children under the age of 18 living with them, 64.5% were married couples living together, 10.5% had a female householder with no husband present, and 19.1% were non-families. 13.7% of all households were made up of individuals, and 13.7% had someone living alone. The average household size was 2.91 and the average family size was 3.18.

In the township the population was spread out, with 31.8% under the age of 20, 21.3% from 20 to 39, 31.2% from 40 to 59, 10.9% from 60 to 69, and 4.8% who were 70 years of age or older. The median age was 37.8 years.

Based on the 2000 census: The median income for a household in the township was $50,000, and the median income for a family was $55,121. Males had a median income of $38,466 versus $27,760 for females. The per capita income for the township was $18,866. About 8.1% of families and 11.5% of the population were below the poverty line, including 18.9% of those under age 18 and 9.4% of those age 65 or over.

== Government ==
Blue Lake Township is managed by a township board and is headed by the office of supervisor. The current sitting supervisor is Melonie Arbogast.
