= Wabaningo, Michigan =

- Unincorporated community
- Location within the state of Michigan
- Coordinates: 43°22′14″N 86°25′18″W
- Country: United States
- State: Michigan
- County: Muskegon
- Township: Fruitland
- Elevation: 623 ft (190 m)
- Time zone: UTC-5 (Eastern (EST))
  - Summer (DST): UTC-4 (EDT)
- Area code: 231
- GNIS feature ID: 1615639

Wabaningo is a small unincorporated community of Fruitland Township, Muskegon County in the U.S. state of Michigan. It is situated where the White Lake flows through a short navigation channel into Lake Michigan at 43°22′31″N 86°25′36″W.

Wabaningo, now a resort community, was originally settled in the 18th century by the Grand River Band of Ottawa. It was first called Sylvan Beach, but the post office, established in 1897, was named Wabaningo, after the Ottawa leader Wabiwindego, who Whitehall founder Charles Mears met there in 1837. It was made a branch of the Whitehall office in 1954. The office operated as a summer post office from 1897–1938, 1939–1942, 1944–1953, 1954–1965, and 1966–1999. Wabaningo is no longer an acceptable name for delivery, although Sylvan Beach is an acceptable name with the Whitehall ZIP code 49461.

It is also the location of the White River Light station, which includes a lighthouse built in 1875, which now houses a small lighthouse and maritime museum. The original Fresnel lens is on display there.
