= Whitehall Township, Michigan =

- Township
- Location within Michigan Location within the United States
- Coordinates: 43°24′45″N 86°17′47″W
- Country: United States
- State: Michigan
- County: Muskegon

Area
  - Total: 9.4 sq mi (24 km^{2})
  - Land: 9.1 sq mi (24 km^{2})
  - Water: 0.3 sq mi (0.78 km^{2})
- Elevation: 653 ft (199 m)

Population (2020)
  - Total: 1,768
  - Density: 194.4/sq mi (75.1/km^{2})
- Time zone: UTC-5 (Eastern (EST))
  - Summer (DST): UTC-4 (EDT)
- ZIP codes: 49461, 49463 (Whitehall); 49437 (Montague)
- Area code: 231
- FIPS code: 26-121-86800
- GNIS feature ID: 1627263
- Website: whitehalltwp.org

Whitehall Township is a civil township of Muskegon County in the U.S. state of Michigan. The population was 1,768 at the 2020 census.

== Geography ==
The township is in northern Muskegon County and is bordered to the west by the city of Whitehall. It is 16 miles (26 km) north of Muskegon, the county seat. U.S. Route 31, a four-lane freeway, crosses the township, with access from Exit 126 (West White Lake Drive) and Exit 128 (Business US-31 leading into Whitehall city).

According to the U.S. Census Bureau, Whitehall Township has a total area of 9.4 square miles (24 km^{2}), of which 9.1 square miles (24 km^{2}) are land and 0.3 square miles (0.8 km^{2}), or 3.42%, are water. The White River crosses the northwestern part of the township, entering White Lake, an arm of Lake Michigan, at Whitehall city.

== Demographics ==
Historical population
| Census | Pop. | Note | %± |
|---|---|---|---|
| 1880 | 1,835 | | — |
| 1890 | 2,014 | | 9.8% |
| 1900 | 1,582 | | −21.4% |
| 1910 | 1,543 | | −2.5% |
| 1920 | 1,307 | | −15.3% |
| 1930 | 1,472 | | 12.6% |
| 1940 | 1,534 | | 4.2% |
| 1950 | 251 | | −83.6% |
| 1960 | 496 | | 97.6% |
| 1970 | 1,064 | | 114.5% |
| 1980 | 1,341 | | 26.0% |
| 1990 | 1,464 | | 9.2% |
| 2000 | 1,648 | | 12.6% |
| 2010 | 1,739 | | 5.5% |
| 2020 | 1,768 | | 1.7% |
U.S. Decennial Census

At the 2000 census, there were 1,648 people, 617 households and 459 families residing in the township. The population density was 174.7 inhabitants per square mile (67.5/km^{2}). There were 664 housing units at an average density of 70.4 per square mile (27.2/km^{2}). The racial makeup of the township was 97.21% White, 1.15% African American, 0.42% Native American, 0.18% Asian, 0.18% from other races, and 0.85% from two or more races. Hispanic or Latino of any race were 1.27% of the population.

There were 617 households, of which 35.5% had children under the age of 18 living with them, 63.0% were married couples living together, 8.1% had a female householder with no husband present, and 25.6% were non-families. 22.0% of all households were made up of individuals, and 7.0% had someone living alone who was 65 years of age or older. The average household size was 2.60 and the average family size was 3.02.

Age distribution was 27.0% under the age of 18, 7.3% from 18 to 24, 26.5% from 25 to 44, 28.9% from 45 to 64, and 10.3% who were 65 years of age or older. The median age was 39 years. For every 100 females, there were 96.7 males. For every 100 females age 18 and over, there were 96.6 males.

The median household income was $50,375, and the median family income was $56,923. Males had a median income of $45,461 versus $28,819 for females. The per capita income for the township was $21,989. About 2.0% of families and 4.1% of the population were below the poverty line, including 2.6% of those under age 18 and 5.7% of those age 65 or over.

== See also ==
- Michigan Heritage Park
