= Mouth Cemetery =

Historic cemetery in Muskegon County, Michigan, US

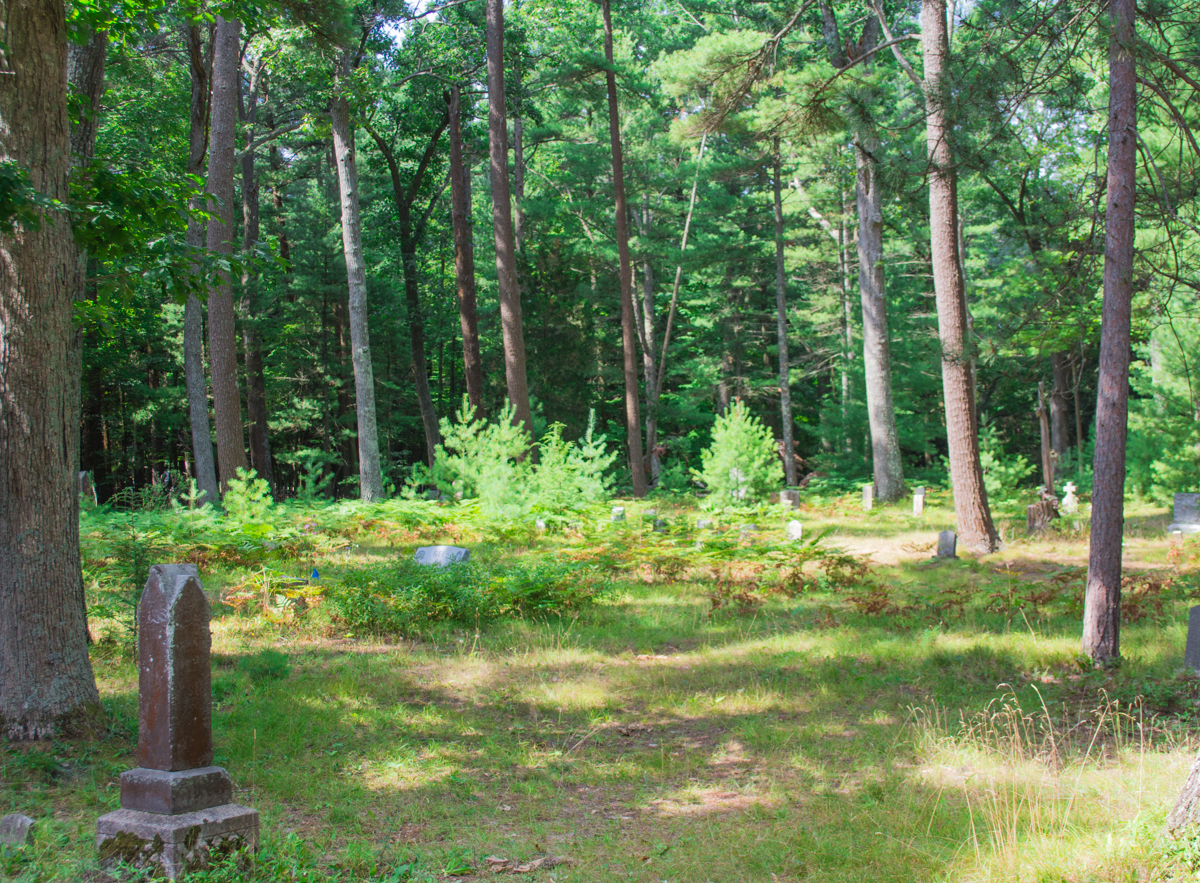

Details
- Location: Montague, Michigan
- Country: United States
- Coordinates: 43.386012°N 86.422736°W
- No. of graves: 300
- Find a Grave: Mouth Cemetery

Mouth Cemetery is a historic cemetery located in Muskegon County, Michigan, near the city of Montague. The cemetery is located in a rural forested area. It is the oldest cemetery in Muskegon County. There are around 300 graves in the cemetery. The cemetery is open to the public from dawn to dusk, with access from Sunset Lane, a dirt road behind the old Mouth Elementary School, one of the oldest schools in the area, which has since been transformed into a church. Many children have been buried here, with a much larger proportion of children compared to other cemeteries. Many people have reported strange paranormal events, and there is an urban legend that a teenage boy sat in a chair named 'Sadony's Chair', and was killed in a car accident exactly one year after sitting in the chair. The most popular grave belongs to Captain William Robinson, the White River lighthouse keeper. William Robinson was the original maintainer of the lighthouse, starting from when it was built in 1875, all the way to his death in 1919. He died the day before he was supposed to leave the lighthouse.

== History ==
No one knows who the first burial was as all records from 1848 to 1859 are missing, possibly even destroyed. The oldest verifiable grave is Sarah Jane Beatrice, who died on February 28, 1851. The oldest person to be buried here is Quis-Mo-Squa, who is believed to be born in 1787, and died on December 12, 1897, at 110 years old.

In the 1800s, 39 people died from an unknown epidemic after traveling on a ship across Lake Michigan. Many were buried at the Mouth Cemetery; however most gravestone markings have been lost, with the wooden crosses having since rotted.

In 1987, an iron fence was constructed, attempting to keep out vandals, but proved to be ineffective.

== Paranormal activity ==
Mouth Cemetery has had many alleged incidents of paranormal activity over the years. It may even be considered one of the most haunted cemeteries in the state of Michigan.

Karen McDonnell, a staff member of the White River Lighthouse, takes care of the lighthouse to give tours. She has reported that she's heard footsteps inside the lighthouse, possibly belonging to the spirit of William Robinson, the original maintainer of the lighthouse. Karen even asked her friends to take care of the lighthouse. Without informing them about the paranormal sounds, they would still ask whether she's heard a ghost walking upstairs.

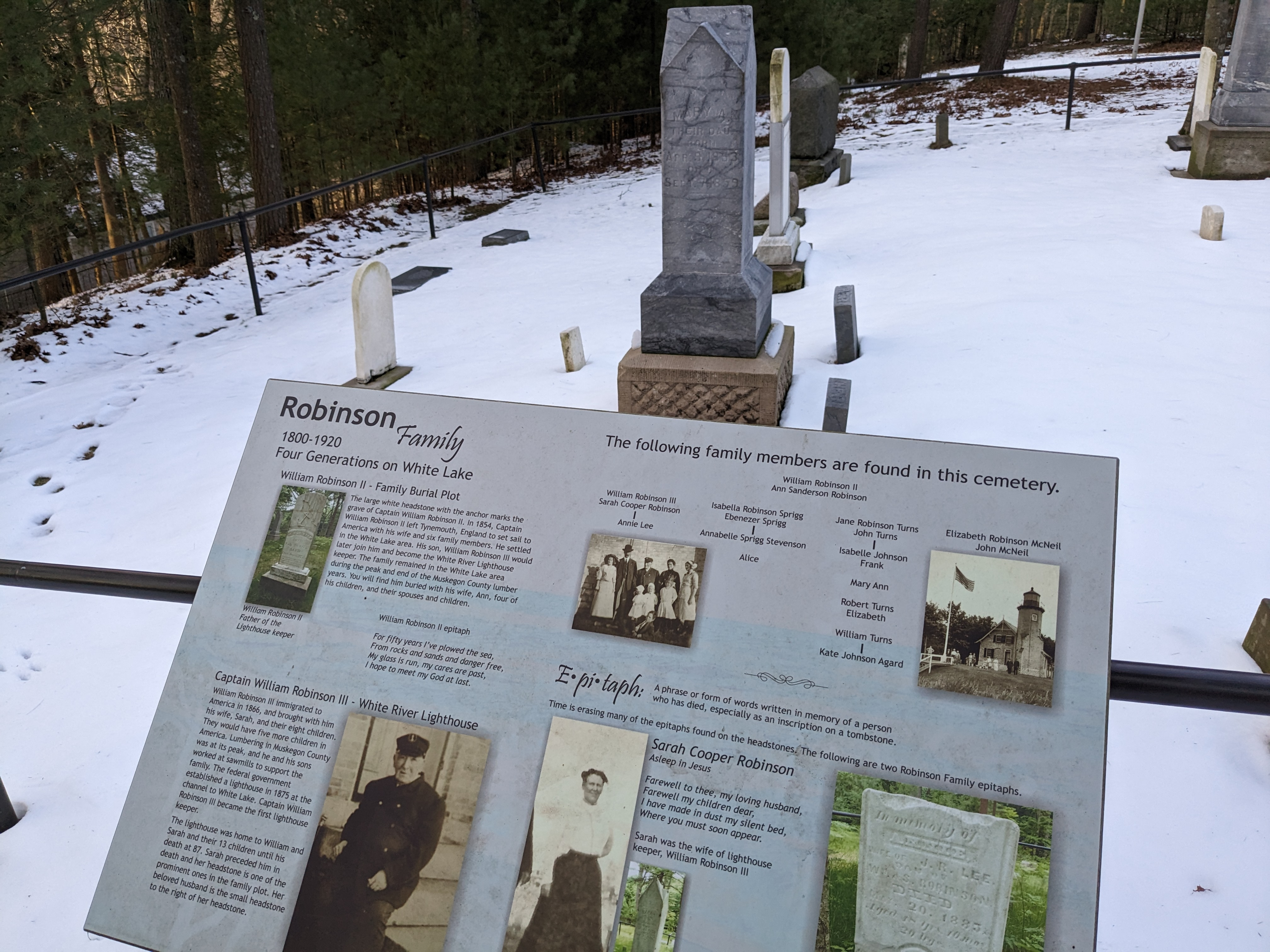
Information board about the Robinson family
