= Hart–Montague Trail State Park =

State park in Michigan, United States

William Field Memorial Hart–Montague Trail State Park
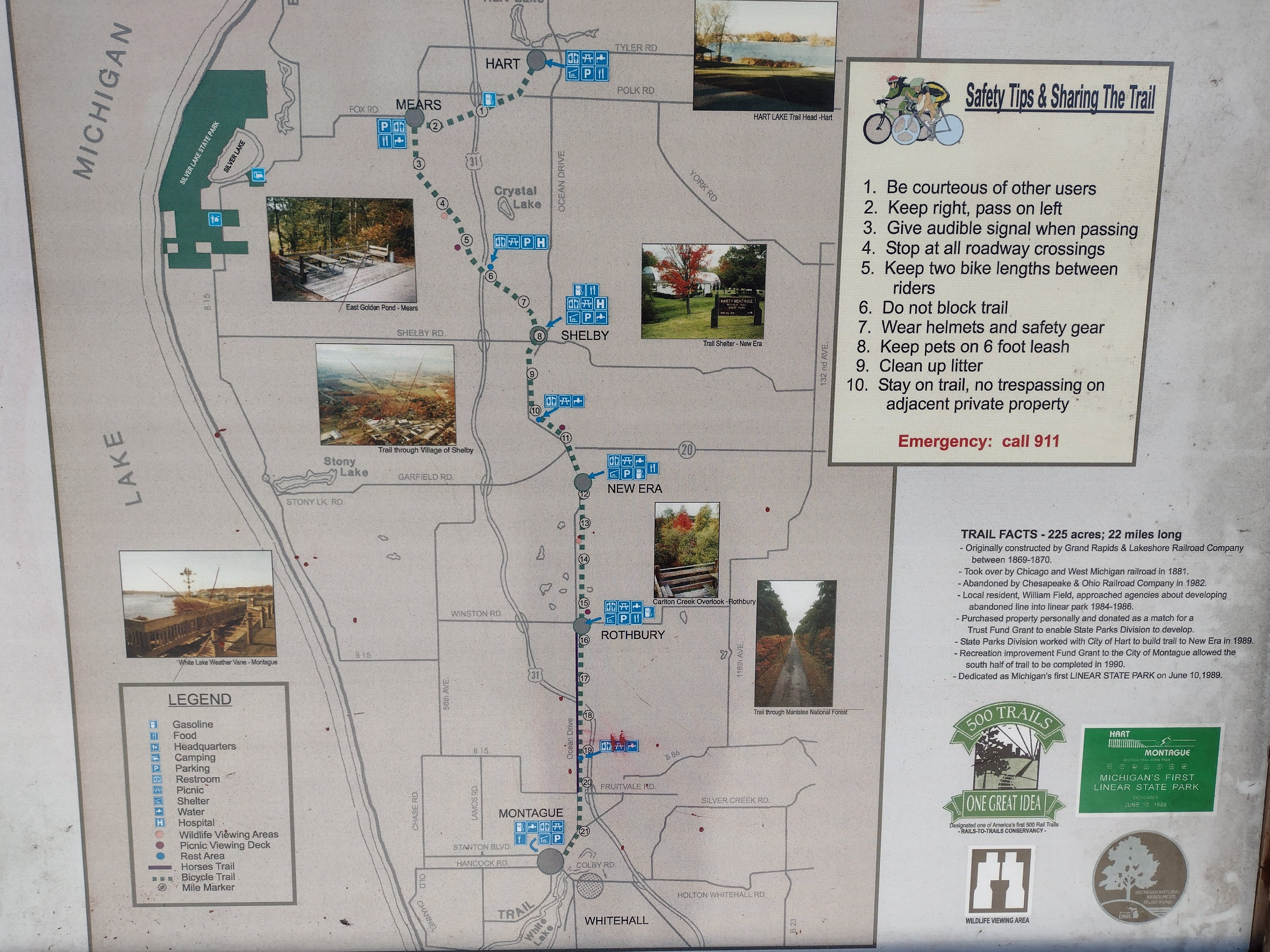
- Information board at the trailheads
- Length: 22 mi (35 km)
- Location: Lower Peninsula, Muskegon County, Oceana County, Michigan USA
- Established: 1988
- Trailheads: Hart, Michigan; Shelby, Michigan; New Era, Michigan; Rothbury, Michigan; Montague, Michigan
- Use: Cycling, Hiking, Snow-mobiling, XC skiing
- Difficulty: Easy
- Season: All
- Surface: Asphalt
- Maintained by: Michigan Department of Natural Resources
- Website: Official site
- Bike trail route highlighted in red
Trail map

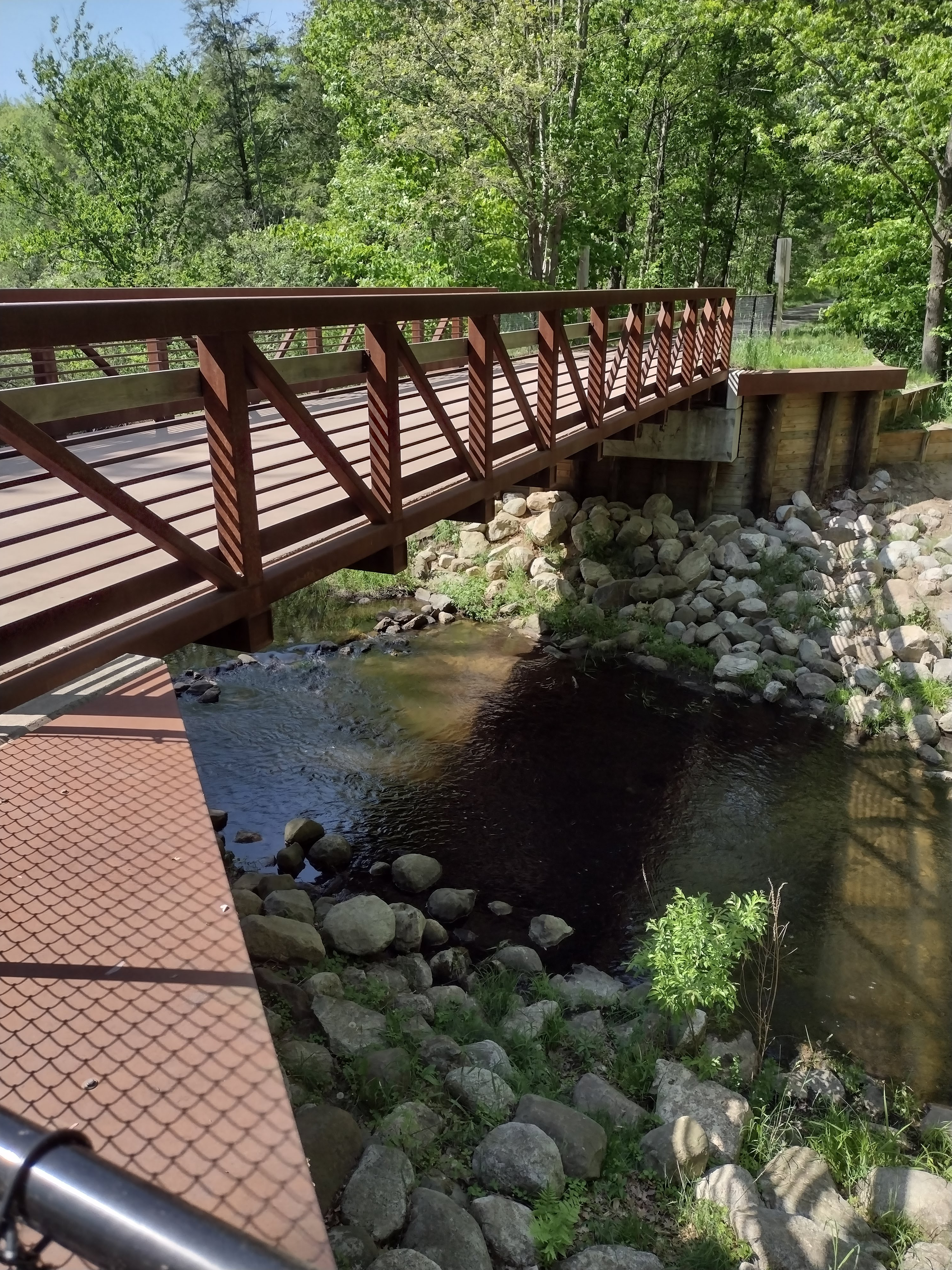
Carlton Creek Bridge North of Rothbury, Michigan

William Field Memorial Hart–Montague Trail State Park, previously and more commonly known as Hart–Montague Trail State Park, is a linear state park in Michigan that consists of a bicycle trail running from the city of Montague in Muskegon County to the city of Hart in Oceana County. The trail is very easy to ride, as it was built on former Chicago & West Michigan railroad right of way (later abandoned by the Chesapeake & Ohio Railway) with a very low grade. The trail is also very popular for snowmobiles in the winter months.

== History ==
Recognizing its potential, Bill Field of Shelby purchased the former railroad and donated it for trail use to the State of Michigan. Opened in 1991 and officially adopted as a Rails to Trails park in 1996, it was one of the first "Rails to Trails" projects in the State of Michigan. Its success paved the way for more trails throughout the state and Midwest. The trail's total length was previously 22 miles (35 km); however, new trails, notably the "White Lake Pathway", "Fred Meijer Berry Junction Trail", "McMillan Trail", and Muskegon's "Lakeshore Trail" have been constructed south of Montague, which makes it possible to bike from Hart to Muskegon, a total of 45 miles (72 km), without ever leaving a bike trail.

== Attractions ==
A number of local businesses, such as restaurants and ice cream parlors, in the towns along the trail have posted small, discreet signage near the trail to attract cycling visitors who might not otherwise ever notice the little shops in the intervening small municipalities. A whimsically themed ice cream/dairy bar in New Era, roughly halfway along the trail, is often mentioned by trail visitors, although there are also a number of others spread along the trail. There is a bicycle rental shop on Thompson St in Montague in the south, a repair shop right off the trail in Mears as well as another rental shop on Silver Lake Rd in Mears several miles away from the northern section of the trail.

== Waypoints ==
Waypoints for the Hart–Montague Trail. ↑ in the Distance column points to the other waypoint that the distance is between.

Location	Services	Distance (approx.)	Coordinates
Hart, Michigan	Parking, Restroom, Picnic Tables, Bike Repair Station		43°41′21″N 86°22′22″W
Mears, Michigan		↑ 2.5 miles (4.0 km)	43°40′39″N 86°25′07″W
Shelby, Michigan	Drinking Fountain, Parking, Restroom, Picnic Table Shelter, Bike Repair Station	↑ 5.3 miles (8.5 km)	43°36′42″N 86°21′54″W
New Era, Michigan	Drinking Fountain, Parking, Restroom, Picnic Table Shelter	↑ 3.8 miles (6.1 km)	43°33′35″N 86°20′42″W
Rothbury, Michigan	Drinking Fountain, Restroom	↑ 3.9 miles (6.3 km)	43°30′12″N 86°20′40″W
Montague, Michigan	Drinking Fountain, Parking, Restroom, Picnic Table Shelter	↑ 6 miles (10 km)	43°25′01″N 86°21′10″W
