= White River Light =

Lighthouse in Michigan, United States

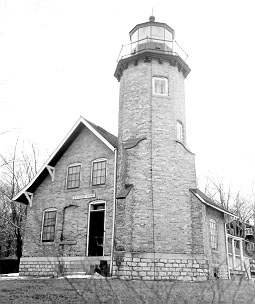
- White River Light Station, Source: U.S. Coast Guard Archives
- Location: Near Whitehall, Michigan
- Coordinates: 43.37473°N 86.42433°W

Tower
- Construction: 'Norman Gothic Style'
- Automated: 1918
- Height: 11.5 m (38 ft)
- Shape: Octagonal
- Markings: Cream yellow brick

Light
- First lit: 1872 South Pier, 1876 Main Tower
- Deactivated: 1960
- Lens: Fourth order Fresnel lens
- Range: Visible for about 14 miles (23 km)
- Characteristic: Original lens a fixed white light with a red flash once each minute. 1912, light flashed white for 10 seconds then dark for 10 seconds & repeated.

The White River Light is a lighthouse on Lake Michigan near the city of Whitehall, Michigan. It sits on a thin peninsula of land separating Lake Michigan from White Lake. The building was built in 1875.

Some of the buildings in existence for the lightstation consisted of the tower and attached dwelling, the South Pier-head Beacon light, oil house, woodshed or storage building and Privy. It is one of four lighthouses that are operated by the Sable Points Lighthouse Keepers Association.

Captain William Robinson was the first lighthouse keeper, working there for 47 years. He lived there with his wife and thirteen children. His residence was built out of limestone, the same material used to build the attached forty-foot tower. Towards the end of his life, Robinson walked with a cane. The lighthouse is said to be haunted, with people hearing the tapping of Robinson's cane. Frances Marshall, known as the last female lighthouse keeper in Michigan, worked there after his service.

The lighthouse served as a guide to the river until 1960, when it was decommissioned. Fruitland Township acquired the lighthouse in 1966 and built a museum in 1970. Visitors can climb the spiral staircase or look at the original Fourth Order Fresnel lens. It is open to the public as a museum with regular hours posted from Memorial Weekend through August 31. The lighthouse is also open through September and October with reduced hours. The museum has a number of artifacts from the passenger and freight shipping on the lakes in addition to information on the light itself.

== See also ==
- Lighthouses in the United States
