= Sylvan Beach =

Sylvan Beach may refer to

- Sylvan Beach, New York, a village in Oneida County
- A hamlet in the state of New York in the towns of Tyrone, New York in Schuyler County and Wayne, New York in Steuben County.
- The community of Wabaningo, Michigan was formerly known as Sylvan Beach and there is still a beach there with that name.
- A historic shoreline park in the La Porte, Texas.
