= Muskegon County, Michigan =

County in Michigan, United States

- County
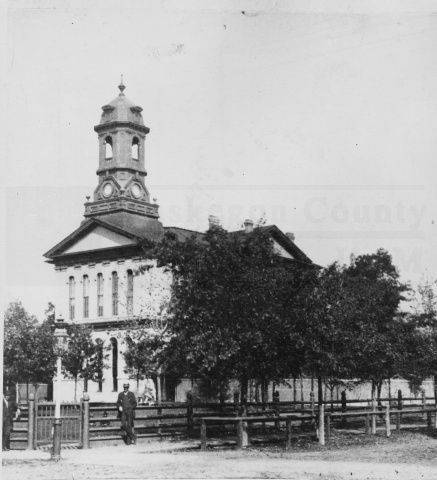
- Muskegon County Courthouse

- Seal

- Location within the U.S. state of Michigan
- Coordinates: 43°17′N 86°27′W
- Country: United States
- State: Michigan
- Founded: 1859
- Named for: Muskegon River
- Seat: Muskegon
- Largest city: Norton Shores (area), Muskegon (population)

Area
  - Total: 1,460 sq mi (3,800 km^{2})
  - Land: 499 sq mi (1,290 km^{2})
  - Water: 961 sq mi (2,490 km^{2}) 66%

Population (2020)
  - Total: 175,824
  - Estimate (2025): 177,901 ▲
  - Density: 345/sq mi (133/km^{2})
- Time zone: UTC−5 (Eastern)
  - Summer (DST): UTC−4 (EDT)
- Congressional districts: 2nd, 3rd
- Website: www.co.muskegon.mi.us

Muskegon County (/məˈskiːɡən/ mə-SKEE-gən) is a county in the U.S. state of Michigan. As of 2020, the population was 175,824. The county seat is Muskegon.

Muskegon County comprises the Muskegon, MI Metropolitan Statistical Area, which is part of the larger Grand Rapids-Kentwood-Muskegon, MI Combined Statistical Area.

== History ==
Around 1812, Jean Baptiste Recollect and Pierre Constant set up trading posts in the area. By the Treaty of Washington (1836), Native Americans ceded parts of Michigan, including future Muskegon County, to the United States. This opened up the area to greater settlement by European Americans, who developed farms.

Prior to 1859, the majority of Muskegon County was part of Ottawa County (the Southern three quarters). Grand Haven served as the County Seat of this combined County, and still serves as the Ottawa County seat today.

Muskegon County was organized in 1859. Its name is from the Muskegon River, which runs through it and empties into Muskegon Lake and subsequently flows into Lake Michigan. The word "Muskegon" comes from the Ojibwa/Chippewa word mashkig, meaning "marsh" or "swamp". See List of Michigan county name etymologies.

== Geography ==
According to the U.S. Census Bureau, the county has a total area of 1,460 square miles (3,800 km^{2}), of which 499 square miles (1,290 km^{2}) is land and 961 square miles (2,490 km^{2}) (66%) is water.

Michigan's second longest river, Muskegon River, flows through the county with its north and south branches emptying into Muskegon Lake. Muskegon Lake then empties into Lake Michigan via the Muskegon Channel. Muskegon Lake is Michigan's only deep water port on Lake Michigan. In the north the White River flows through the county into White Lake and then on to Lake Michigan. In the south, Black Creek flows into Mona Lake which also flows into Lake Michigan. These three lakes allow boat navigation to and from Lake Michigan, making it one of the states most boat accessible counties, with Muskegon Lake allowing access for additional large commercial vessels.

=== Bodies of water ===
- Muskegon Lake
- Muskegon River
- Mona Lake
- White Lake
- White River
- Little Black Lake
- Little Blue Lake
- Wolf Lake
- Fox Lake
- Big Blue Lake
- Bear Lake
- Duck Lake
- Twin Lake

=== National protected area ===
- Manistee National Forest (part)

=== Transit ===
- Muskegon Area Transit System
- Lake Express

=== Major highways ===
- I-96
- US 31
- Bus. US 31 (Muskegon)
- Bus. US 31 (Whitehall-Montague)
- M-37
- M-46
- M-120
- B-15
- B-23
- B-31
- B-35
- B-72
- B-86

=== Adjacent counties ===
By land

- Oceana County, Michigan - north
- Newaygo County, Michigan - northeast
- Kent County, Michigan - east
- Ottawa County, Michigan - east, south

By water

- Milwaukee County, Wisconsin - southwest
- Ozaukee County, Wisconsin - west

== Demographics ==
Historical population
Census	Pop.	Note	%±
1860	3,947		—
1870	14,894		277.3%
1880	26,586		78.5%
1890	40,013		50.5%
1900	37,036		−7.4%
1910	40,577		9.6%
1920	62,362		53.7%
1930	84,630		35.7%
1940	94,501		11.7%
1950	121,545		28.6%
1960	129,943		6.9%
1970	157,426		21.2%
1980	157,589		0.1%
1990	158,983		0.9%
2000	170,200		7.1%
2010	172,188		1.2%
2020	175,824		2.1%
2025 (est.)	177,901	▲	1.2%
U.S. Decennial Census; 1790-1960 1900-1990; 1990-2000 2010-2019

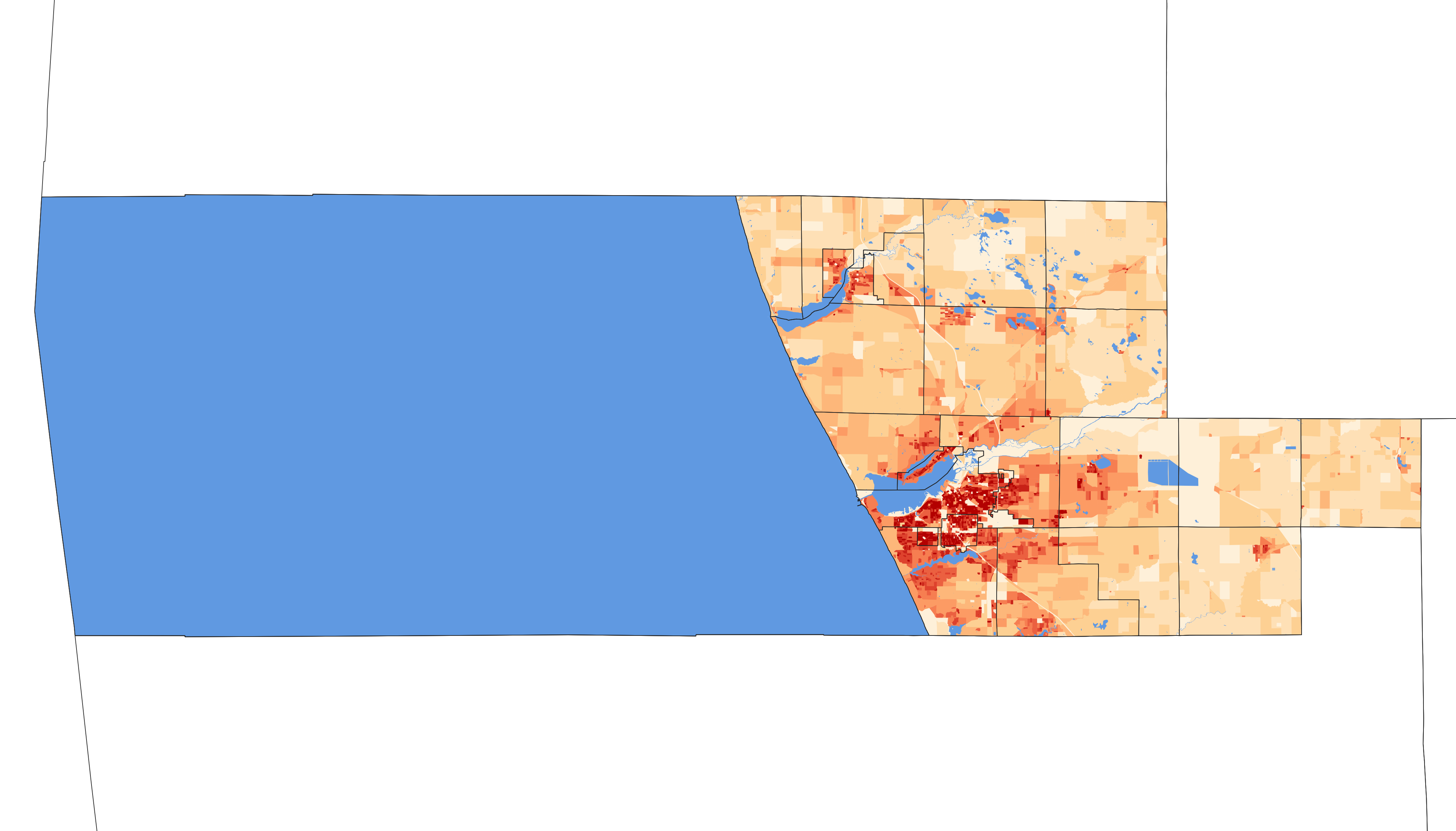
2020 population density of Muskegon County MI by census block

=== Racial and ethnic composition ===
Muskegon County, Michigan – Racial and ethnic composition Note: the US Census treats Hispanic/Latino as an ethnic category. This table excludes Latinos from the racial categories and assigns them to a separate category. Hispanics/Latinos may be of any race.
Race / Ethnicity (NH = Non-Hispanic)	Pop 1980	Pop 1990	Pop 2000	Pop 2010	Pop 2020	% 1980	% 1990	% 2000	% 2010	% 2020
White alone (NH)	134,064	132,045	135,379	133,132	130,141	85.07%	83.06%	79.54%	77.32%	74.02%
Black or African American alone (NH)	19,039	21,444	23,971	24,599	23,622	12.08%	13.49%	14.08%	14.29%	13.44%
Native American or Alaska Native alone (NH)	1,120	1,236	1,237	1,240	1,106	0.71%	0.78%	0.73%	0.72%	0.63%
Asian alone (NH)	395	536	711	919	1,073	0.25%	0.34%	0.42%	0.53%	0.61%
Native Hawaiian or Pacific Islander alone (NH)	x	x	16	18	31	x	x	0.01%	0.01%	0.02%
Other race alone (NH)	138	99	133	122	537	0.09%	0.06%	0.08%	0.07%	0.31%
Mixed race or Multiracial (NH)	x	x	2,752	3,897	9,031	x	x	1.62%	2.26%	5.14%
Hispanic or Latino (any race)	2,833	3,623	6,001	8,261	10,283	1.80%	2.28%	3.53%	4.80%	5.85%
Total	157,589	158,983	170,200	172,188	175,824	100.00%	100.00%	100.00%	100.00%	100.00%

=== 2020 census ===
As of the 2020 census, the county had a population of 175,824. The median age was 40.4 years. 22.5% of residents were under the age of 18 and 18.1% of residents were 65 years of age or older. For every 100 females there were 99.4 males, and for every 100 females age 18 and over there were 98.2 males age 18 and over.

The racial makeup of the county was 76.1% White, 13.6% Black or African American, 0.8% American Indian and Alaska Native, 0.6% Asian, <0.1% Native Hawaiian and Pacific Islander, 1.9% from some other race, and 7.0% from two or more races. Hispanic or Latino residents of any race comprised 5.8% of the population.

74.0% of residents lived in urban areas, while 26.0% lived in rural areas.

There were 68,610 households in the county, of which 29.6% had children under the age of 18 living in them. Of all households, 44.4% were married-couple households, 18.8% were households with a male householder and no spouse or partner present, and 28.4% were households with a female householder and no spouse or partner present. About 28.2% of all households were made up of individuals and 12.7% had someone living alone who was 65 years of age or older.

There were 74,591 housing units, of which 8.0% were vacant. Among occupied housing units, 75.1% were owner-occupied and 24.9% were renter-occupied. The homeowner vacancy rate was 1.3% and the rental vacancy rate was 6.7%.

=== 2010 census ===
As of the 2010 United States census, there were 172,188 people living in the county. 77.4% were non-Hispanic White, 14.6% Black or African American, 0.6% Asian, 0.9% Native American, and 2.5% of two or more races. 4.8% were Hispanic or Latino (of any race).

=== 2000 census ===
As of the 2000 census, there were 170,200 people, 63,330 households, and 44,267 families living in the county. The population density was 334 inhabitants per square mile (129/km^{2}). There were 68,556 housing units at an average density of 135 per square mile (52/km^{2}). The racial makeup of the county was 81.25% White, 14.20% Black or African American, 0.82% Native American, 0.42% Asian, 0.01% Pacific Islander, 1.28% from other races, and 2.01% from two or more races. 3.53% of the population were Hispanic or Latino of any race. 17.2% were of German, 9.8% Dutch, 7.3% American, 7.2% English, 6.8% Irish and 5.5% Polish ancestry, 95.9% spoke English and 2.6% Spanish as their first language.

There were 63,330 households, of which 34.60% had children under the age of 18 living with them, 51.60% were married couples living together, 13.90% had a female householder with no husband present, and 30.10% were non-families. 25.20% of all households were made up of individuals, and 10.40% had someone living alone who was 65 years of age or older. The average household size was 2.59 and the average family size was 3.10.

In the county, the population was spread out, with 27.50% under the age of 18, 8.70% from 18 to 24, 29.00% from 25 to 44, 21.90% from 45 to 64, and 12.90% who were 65 years of age or older. The median age was 36 years. For every 100 females, there were 98.30 males. For every 100 females age 18 and over, there were 95.40 males.

The county's median household income was $38,008, and the median family income was $45,710. Males had a median income of $35,952 versus $25,430 for females. The per capita income for the county was $17,967. About 8.80% of families and 11.40% of the population were below the poverty line, including 16.00% of those under age 18 and 8.20% of those age 65 or over.

== Government ==
Prior to 1932, Muskegon County was a Republican Party stronghold in presidential elections, aside from 1912 where the split Republican vote primarily backed former president & third-party candidate Theodore Roosevelt. The county became a Republican-leaning swing county from 1932 to 1988. It only supported a Democrat for president six times during this period; 1948 was the only election in this period that was not a national Democratic landslide.

Starting with the 1992 election, the county became somewhat friendlier to Democratic presidential candidates, and for a quarter-century was one of the few Democratic bastions in traditionally Republican West Michigan. However, after narrowly losing the county in both 2016 and 2020 amid his surge in the Rust Belt, Donald Trump flipped it in 2024. Generally, the more urbanized southwest corner of the county, namely Muskegon, Muskegon Heights, and Roosevelt Park, leans Democratic. Norton Shores is more of a swing area. The more rural areas of the county are powerfully Republican.

Beginning in 1972, Muskegon County has been a bellwether for the state of Michigan. Since that election, the only time it did not back the statewide winner in a presidential election was in 2016, and even in that election, it was the narrowest county win for Hillary Clinton in Michigan, the state that gave Trump his narrowest win nationwide.

United States presidential election results for Muskegon County, Michigan
Year	Republican		Democratic		Third party(ies)	
Year	No.	%	No.	%	No.	%
1884	3,483	49.79%	3,171	45.33%	342	4.89%
1888	4,521	52.44%	3,514	40.76%	587	6.81%
1892	3,830	49.76%	3,301	42.89%	566	7.35%
1896	4,682	58.79%	3,110	39.05%	172	2.16%
1900	5,250	63.60%	2,796	33.87%	209	2.53%
1904	5,453	76.46%	1,181	16.56%	498	6.98%
1908	5,070	69.25%	1,794	24.50%	457	6.24%
1912	1,523	18.47%	1,678	20.35%	5,045	61.18%
1916	5,692	52.16%	4,465	40.91%	756	6.93%
1920	11,702	73.70%	3,468	21.84%	707	4.45%
1924	14,422	79.22%	1,462	8.03%	2,322	12.75%
1928	16,997	76.28%	5,158	23.15%	126	0.57%
1932	11,971	45.58%	13,497	51.39%	797	3.03%
1936	9,366	34.52%	17,252	63.58%	515	1.90%
1940	14,957	43.45%	19,257	55.94%	210	0.61%
1944	16,536	44.95%	19,963	54.27%	287	0.78%
1948	15,382	41.45%	20,631	55.60%	1,094	2.95%
1952	25,967	51.47%	23,826	47.23%	653	1.29%
1956	30,395	54.04%	25,679	45.65%	172	0.31%
1960	32,667	52.98%	28,755	46.63%	239	0.39%
1964	22,146	37.51%	36,769	62.28%	119	0.20%
1968	28,233	48.11%	24,492	41.74%	5,958	10.15%
1972	36,428	59.60%	22,804	37.31%	1,893	3.10%
1976	35,548	56.06%	27,013	42.60%	846	1.33%
1980	36,512	53.73%	26,645	39.21%	4,797	7.06%
1984	39,355	60.67%	25,247	38.92%	261	0.40%
1988	33,567	53.36%	28,977	46.06%	363	0.58%
1992	23,769	33.04%	32,515	45.19%	15,664	21.77%
1996	21,873	34.48%	35,328	55.69%	6,237	9.83%
2000	30,028	43.35%	37,865	54.66%	1,377	1.99%
2004	35,302	43.96%	44,282	55.14%	729	0.91%
2008	29,145	34.51%	53,821	63.73%	1,490	1.76%
2012	30,884	40.43%	44,436	58.16%	1,077	1.41%
2016	36,127	45.89%	37,304	47.39%	5,292	6.72%
2020	45,133	48.82%	45,643	49.37%	1,668	1.80%
2024	47,733	50.15%	46,028	48.36%	1,420	1.49%

United States Senate election results for Muskegon County, Michigan1
Year	Republican		Democratic		Third party(ies)	
Year	No.	%	No.	%	No.	%
2024	45,231	48.41%	45,182	48.36%	3,025	3.24%

Michigan Gubernatorial election results for Muskegon County
Year	Republican		Democratic		Third party(ies)	
Year	No.	%	No.	%	No.	%
2022	33,121	44.86%	39,269	53.19%	1,443	1.95%

=== County government ===
The county government operates the jail, maintains rural roads, operates the major local courts, keeps files of deeds and mortgages, maintains vital records, administers public health regulations, and participates with the state in the provision of welfare and other social services. The county board of commissioners controls the budget but has only limited authority to make laws or ordinances. In Michigan, most local government functions — police and fire, building and zoning, tax assessment, street maintenance, etc. — are the responsibility of individual cities and townships.

==== Elected officials ====
- Prosecuting Attorney: D.J. Hilson
- Sheriff: Michael J. Poulin
- County Clerk: Karen Buie
- County Treasurer: Tony Moulatsiotis
- Register of Deeds: Mark F. Fairchild
- Drain Commissioner: Brenda M Moore
- County Surveyor: Stephen Vallier

(information as of May 2017)

=== Prison ===
The Michigan Department of Corrections operates the Muskegon Correctional Facility in southeastern Muskegon. The prison first opened in 1974.

=== State representation ===
In The Michigan House of Representatives, Muskegon County is represented by Will Snyder (D) of the 87th district, Greg VanWoerkom (R) of the 88th district, Luke Meerman (R) of the 89th district, and Curt VanderWall (R) of the 102nd district.

In The Michigan Senate, Muskegon County is represented by Jon Bumstead (R) of the 32nd district, and Rick Outman (R) of the 33rd district.

== Education ==
Public School Districts in Muskegon County:

- Fruitport Community Schools
- Holton Public Schools
- Mona Shores Public Schools
- Montague Area Public Schools
- Muskegon Public Schools
- Muskegon Heights Public Schools
- North Muskegon Public Schools
- Orchard View Schools
- Oakridge Public Schools
- Ravenna Public Schools
- Reeths-Puffer School District
- White Lake Area Community Ed.
- Whitehall District Schools

Private School Districts in Muskegon County:

- Broadway Baptist School
- Fruitport Calvary Christian
- Muskegon Catholic Central
- West Michigan Christian

Colleges and Universities:

- Baker College
- Muskegon Community College
- Ross Medical Education Center - Muskegon

== Historical markers ==
There are twenty-three recognized historical markers in the county: They are:

- Bluffton Actors' Colony / Buster Keaton
- Central United Methodist Church [Muskegon]
- Evergreen Cemetery
- Fruitland District No.6 School
- Hackley House
- Hackley Public Library
- Hackley-Holt House
- Hume House
- Jean Baptiste Recollect Trading Post
- Lakeside
- Lebanon Lutheran Church
- Lumbering on White Lake / Staples & Covell Mill
- Marsh Field
- Mouth Cemetery
- Muskegon Business College
- Muskegon Log Booming Company
- Muskegon Woman's Club
- Old Indian Cemetery
- Pinchtown
- Ruth Thompson
- Torrent House
- Union Depot (Muskegon)
- White Lake Yacht Club

== Communities ==
=== Cities ===
- Montague
- Muskegon Heights
- Muskegon (county seat)
- North Muskegon
- Norton Shores
- Roosevelt Park
- Whitehall

=== Villages ===
- Casnovia
- Fruitport
- Lakewood Club
- Ravenna

=== Charter townships ===
- Fruitport Charter Township
- Muskegon Township

=== Civil townships ===
- Blue Lake Township
- Casnovia Township
- Cedar Creek Township
- Dalton Township
- Egelston Township
- Fruitland Township
- Holton Township
- Laketon Township
- Montague Township
- Moorland Township
- Ravenna Township
- Sullivan Township
- White River Township
- Whitehall Township

=== Census-designated places ===
- Twin Lake
- Wolf Lake

=== Unincorporated communities ===
- Wabaningo
- Brunswick (partially)

== See also ==
- List of Michigan State Historic Sites in Muskegon County
- Muskegon Area Transit System
- National Register of Historic Places listings in Muskegon County, Michigan
