= Montague Township, Michigan =

- Township
- Location within Michigan Location within the United States
- Coordinates: 43°26′10″N 86°21′03″W
- Country: United States
- State: Michigan
- County: Muskegon

Area
  - Total: 20.0 sq mi (52 km^{2})
  - Land: 19.1 sq mi (49 km^{2})
  - Water: 0.9 sq mi (2.3 km^{2})
- Elevation: 690 ft (210 m)

Population (2020)
  - Total: 1,555
  - Density: 81.3/sq mi (31.4/km^{2})
- Time zone: UTC-5 (EST)
  - Summer (DST): UTC-4 (EDT)
- ZIP code: 49437 (Montague)
- Area code: 231
- FIPS code: 26-121-55120
- GNIS feature ID: 1626758
- Website: www.montaguetownship.com

Montague Township is a civil township of Muskegon County in the U.S. state of Michigan. The population was 1,555 at the 2020 census. It is adjacent to the city of Montague.

== Geography ==
The township is located in northwestern Muskegon County and is bordered to the north by Oceana County. The city of Montague borders the southwestern portion of the township, while a portion of the city of Whitehall borders the township to the south, across the White River. U.S. Route 31, a four-lane freeway, crosses the township, leading south to Muskegon, the county seat, and north to the Ludington area.

According to the U.S. Census Bureau, Montague Township has a total area of 20.0 square miles (52 km^{2}), of which 19.1 square miles (49 km^{2}) is land and 0.9 square miles (2.3 km^{2}), or 4.49%, is water. Most of the township drains south toward the White River and White Lake, an arm of Lake Michigan, while the northern part is drained by Flower Creek, which flows west directly into Lake Michigan.

Clear Springs Nature Preserve is located within the township.

== Demographics ==
Historical population
Census	Pop.	Note	%±
1880	1,950		—
1890	1,967		0.9%
1900	1,384		−29.6%
1910	1,315		−5.0%
1920	1,160		−11.8%
1930	1,161		0.1%
1940	392		−66.2%
1950	574		46.4%
1960	899		56.6%
1970	1,147		27.6%
1980	1,359		18.5%
1990	1,429		5.2%
2000	1,637		14.6%
2010	1,600		−2.3%
2020	1,555		−2.8%
U.S. Decennial Census

As of the census of 2000, there were 1,637 people, 601 households, and 456 families residing in the township. The population density was 86.6 inhabitants per square mile (33.4/km^{2}). There were 651 housing units at an average density of 34.4 per square mile (13.3/km^{2}). The racial makeup of the township was 95.97% White, 1.41% African American, 1.22% Native American, 0.18% Asian, 0.61% from other races, and 0.61% from two or more races. Hispanic or Latino of any race were 2.02% of the population.

There were 601 households, out of which 34.3% had children under the age of 18 living with them, 63.7% were married couples living together, 8.5% had a female householder with no husband present, and 24.1% were non-families. 19.0% of all households were made up of individuals, and 9.0% had someone living alone who was 65 years of age or older. The average household size was 2.67 and the average family size was 3.05.

In the township the population was spread out, with 25.7% under the age of 18, 9.1% from 18 to 24, 27.6% from 25 to 44, 25.6% from 45 to 64, and 12.0% who were 65 years of age or older. The median age was 37 years. For every 100 females, there were 102.9 males. For every 100 females age 18 and over, there were 100.2 males.

The median income for a household in the township was $41,534, and the median income for a family was $46,471. Males had a median income of $35,650 versus $23,958 for females. The per capita income for the township was $17,695. About 4.1% of families and 7.1% of the population were below the poverty line, including 7.6% of those under age 18 and 2.7% of those age 65 or over.

== Notable people ==
President Abraham Lincoln's first cousin, Hannah Lincoln Sammis, is buried in the township.
