= Twin Lake, Michigan =

Census-designated place in Michigan, United States

- Census-designated place
- Location in Muskegon County and the state of Michigan
- Coordinates: 43°21′46″N 86°09′53″W
- Country: United States
- State: Michigan
- County: Muskegon
- Township: Dalton

Area
  - Total: 3.43 sq mi (8.89 km^{2})
  - Land: 2.88 sq mi (7.45 km^{2})
  - Water: 0.56 sq mi (1.44 km^{2})
- Elevation: 696 ft (212 m)

Population (2020)
  - Total: 2,056
  - Density: 714.8/sq mi (275.99/km^{2})
- Time zone: UTC-5 (Eastern (EST))
  - Summer (DST): UTC-4 (EDT)
- ZIP code: 49457
- Area code: 231
- FIPS code: 26-81040
- GNIS feature ID: 1621982

Twin Lake is an unincorporated community in Muskegon County of the U.S. state of Michigan. It is a census-designated place (CDP) for statistical purposes. Local government services are provided by Dalton Township, though the Twin Lake ZIP code serves parts of neighboring townships. As of the 2020 census, the population of the CDP was 2,056. The surrounding area is the home of Blue Lake Fine Arts Camp, the YMCA's Camp Pinewood, and the Boy Scouts' Gerber Scout Reservation and Owasippe Scout Reservation.

== Geography ==
Twin Lake is in northern Muskegon County, in the northeast part of Dalton Township. The hamlet of Twin Lake is in the southeast part of the CDP, while several natural lakes, including the two Twin Lakes, plus West Lake and North Lake, fill the center of the CDP.

The Twin Lake ZIP code 49457 serves a much larger area, including much of northern and eastern Dalton Township, most of Cedar Creek Township to the east, parts of northern Egelston Township and Muskegon Township to the south, much of Blue Lake Township to the north and the southwest corner of Holton Township.

Twin Lake is 11 miles (18 km) northeast of Muskegon, the county seat, the same distance east-southeast of Whitehall, and 16 miles (26 km) southwest of Fremont. State highway M-120 passes through the hamlet, connecting Muskegon and Fremont.

According to the U.S. Census Bureau, the Twin Lake CDP has a total area of 3.43 square miles (8.9 km^{2}), of which 2.88 square miles (7.5 km^{2}) are land and 0.56 square miles (1.5 km^{2}), or 16.2%, are water.

== Demographics ==
Historical population
Census	Pop.	Note	%±
1990	1,328		—
2000	1,613		21.5%
2010	1,720		6.6%
2020	2,056		19.5%
U.S. Decennial Census

=== 2020 census ===
As of the 2020 census, Twin Lake had a population of 2,056. The median age was 43.5 years. 23.1% of residents were under the age of 18 and 19.4% of residents were 65 years of age or older. For every 100 females there were 94.9 males, and for every 100 females age 18 and over there were 95.3 males age 18 and over.

0.0% of residents lived in urban areas, while 100.0% lived in rural areas.

There were 789 households in Twin Lake, of which 29.9% had children under the age of 18 living in them. Of all households, 66.5% were married-couple households, 13.8% were households with a male householder and no spouse or partner present, and 14.1% were households with a female householder and no spouse or partner present. About 17.2% of all households were made up of individuals and 7.5% had someone living alone who was 65 years of age or older.

There were 904 housing units, of which 12.7% were vacant. The homeowner vacancy rate was 0.7% and the rental vacancy rate was 6.6%.

Racial composition as of the 2020 census
Race	Number	Percent
White	1,885	91.7%
Black or African American	11	0.5%
American Indian and Alaska Native	17	0.8%
Asian	16	0.8%
Native Hawaiian and Other Pacific Islander	0	0.0%
Some other race	19	0.9%
Two or more races	108	5.3%
Hispanic or Latino (of any race)	71	3.5%

=== 2000 census ===
As of the census of 2000, there were 1,613 people, 593 households, and 472 families residing in the community. The population density was 677.4 inhabitants per square mile (261.5/km^{2}). There were 688 housing units at an average density of 288.9 per square mile (111.5/km^{2}). The racial makeup of the community was 95.47% White, 0.56% African American, 1.67% Native American, 0.06% Asian, 0.37% from other races, and 1.86% from two or more races. Hispanic or Latino of any race were 1.92% of the population.

There were 593 households, out of which 35.1% had children under the age of 18 living with them, 71.5% were married couples living together, 5.2% had a female householder with no husband present, and 20.4% were non-families. 16.4% of all households were made up of individuals, and 6.6% had someone living alone who was 65 years of age or older. The average household size was 2.72 and the average family size was 3.02.

In the community, the population was spread out, with 26.7% under the age of 18, 8.2% from 18 to 24, 29.4% from 25 to 44, 25.2% from 45 to 64, and 10.5% who were 65 years of age or older. The median age was 36 years. For every 100 females, there were 103.9 males. For every 100 females age 18 and over, there were 106.8 males.

The median income for a household in the community was $49,141, and the median income for a family was $51,341. Males had a median income of $42,112 versus $31,107 for females. The per capita income for the community was $18,501. About 7.0% of families and 10.2% of the population were below the poverty line, including 10.9% of those under age 18 and 8.6% of those age 65 or over.

== Notable people ==
- Steven Rinella, hunting/outdoor writer and television host
