= White Lake (Michigan) =

Lake in the state of Michigan, United States

White Lake is the name of several lakes in the U.S. state of Michigan. The largest one is formed by the White River flowing to its mouth on Lake Michigan in Muskegon County.

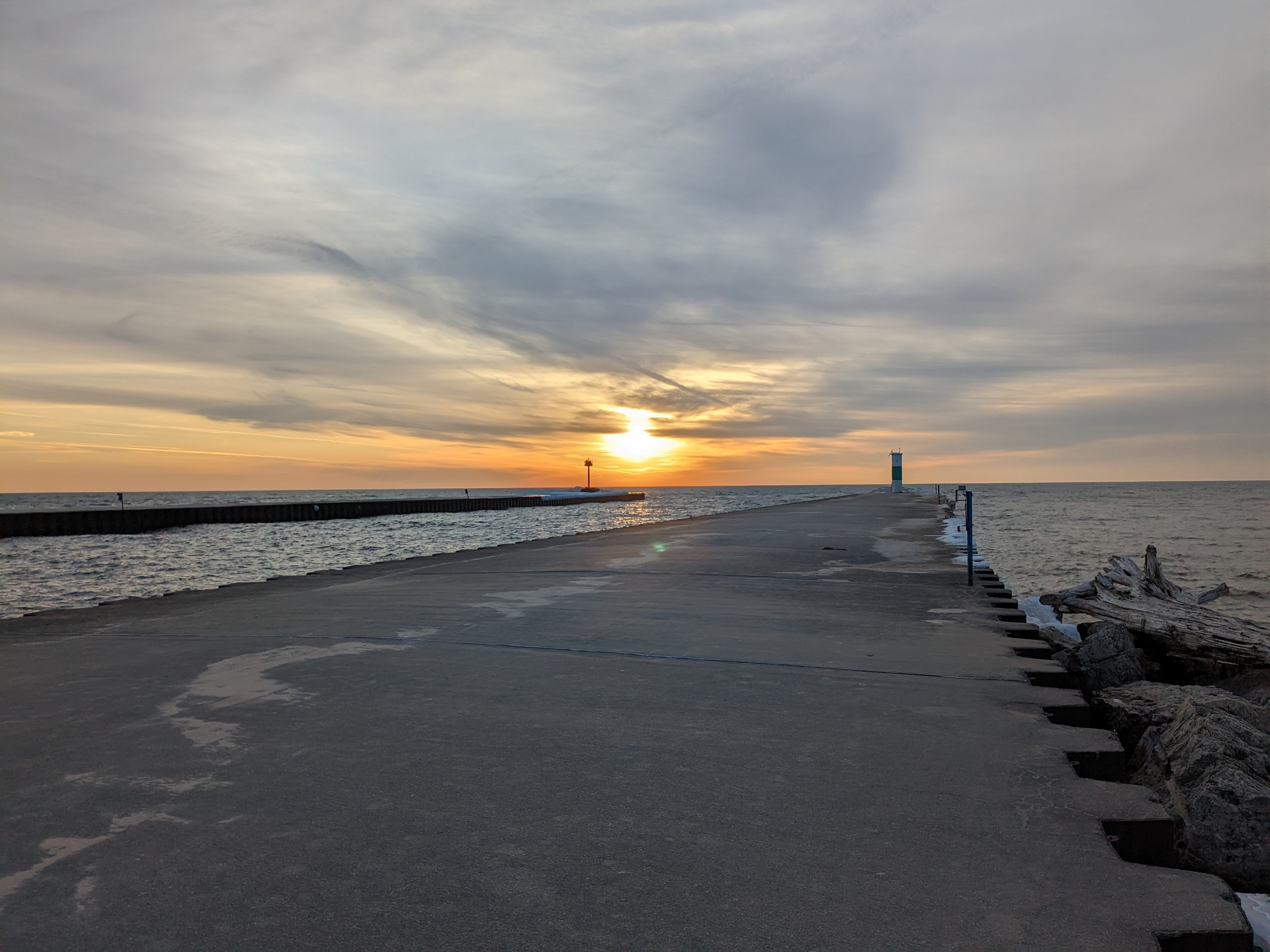
The 'Mouth' of the White River on Lake Michigan

== Muskegon County ==
White Lake
- Location within Michigan Location within the United States
- Location: Muskegon County, Michigan
- Coordinates: 43°22′38″N 86°22′49″W
- Type: Lake
- Primary inflows: White River
- Basin countries: United States
- Surface area: 2,571 acres (1,040 ha)
- Max. depth: 71 ft (22 m)
- Surface elevation: 581 ft (177 m)
- Settlements: Montague, Montague Township, White River Township, Whitehall, Whitehall Township, Fruitland Township

The largest White Lake is in Muskegon County, Michigan, formed by the White River near its mouth on Lake Michigan. The city of Montague, Montague Township and White River Township are on the north side of the lake. The city of Whitehall, Whitehall Township, and Fruitland Township are on the south side of the lake. The unincorporated community of Wabaningo is situated where the lake flows through a short navigation channel into Lake Michigan at 43°22′31″N 86°25′36″W.

The lake takes its name from the white clay that long formed around its banks, which in the 18th and 19th centuries was used for washing by the lake's Ottawa residents. The Ottawa called the lake Waabigankiishkbogong, meaning "The Place of White Clay."

== Others ==
Other smaller lakes are located in the following counties:

- The next largest is in Oakland County, Michigan, within White Lake Township, Michigan at 42°40′07″N 83°33′49″W.

Other White Lakes are in

- Calhoun County, Michigan in Clarence Township, Michigan at 42°22′06″N 84°44′13″W.
- Jackson County, Michigan in Henrietta Township, Michigan at 42°21′31″N 84°20′46″W.
- Lenawee County, Michigan in Cambridge Township, Michigan at 42°02′58″N 84°13′38″W.

== See also ==
- White Lake Township, Michigan in Oakland County
- White Lake (disambiguation)
- List of lakes in Michigan
