= Ruth Thompson =

American politician (1887–1970)

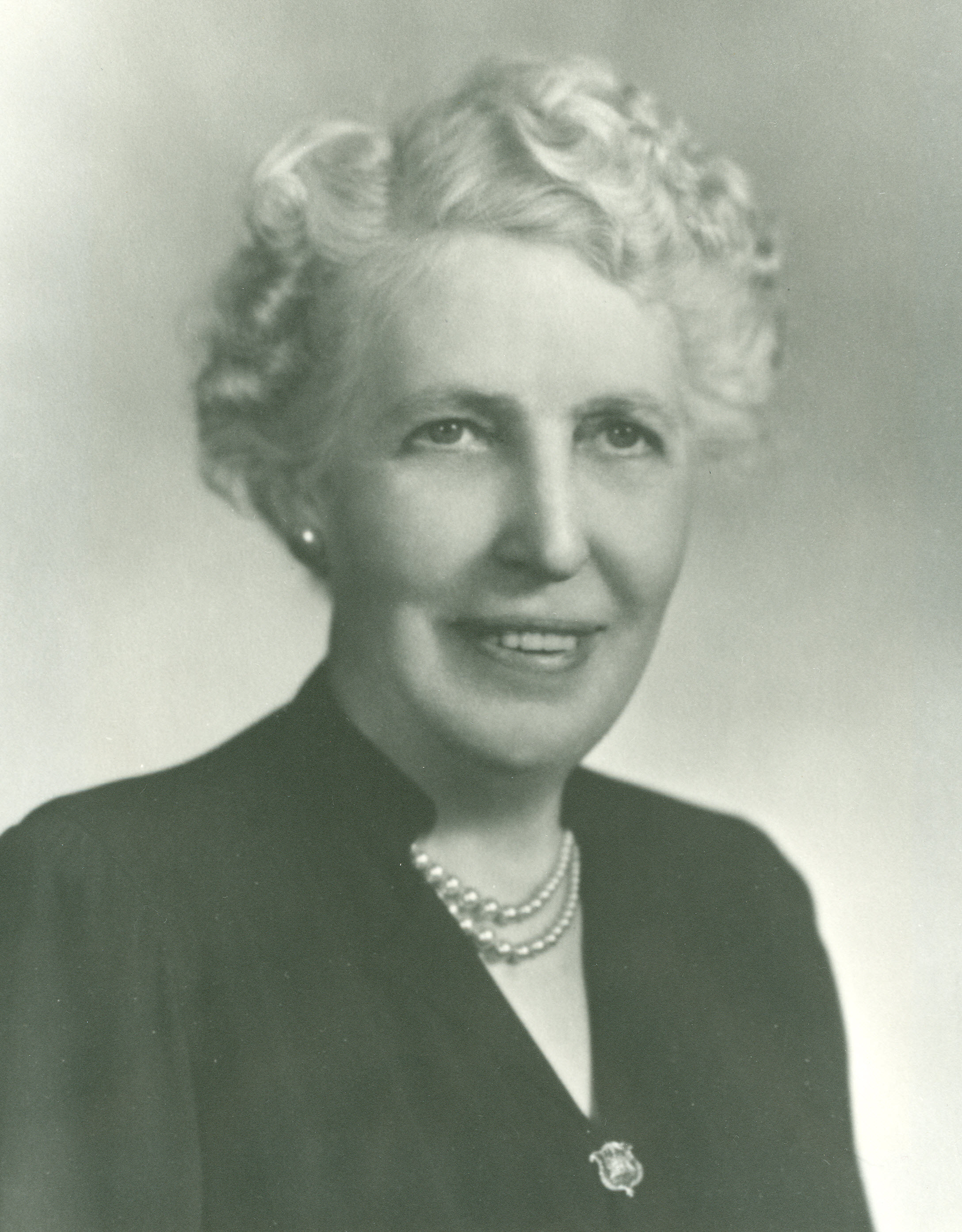
- Ruth Thompson, Pocket Congressional Directory, 83rd Congress

Member of the U.S. House of Representatives from Michigan's 9th district
- In office January 3, 1951 – January 3, 1957
- Preceded by: Albert J. Engel
- Succeeded by: Robert P. Griffin

Member of the Michigan House of Representatives
- In office 1939–1941

Personal details
- Born: September 15, 1887 Whitehall, Michigan
- Died: April 5, 1970 (aged 82) Allegan County, Michigan
- Party: Republican Party
- Education: Muskegon Business College
- Occupation: Attorney

Ruth Thompson (September 15, 1887 – April 5, 1970) was a Republican politician from the U.S. state of Michigan. A lawyer by profession, she served three terms in the United States House of Representatives from 1951 to 1957.

== Biography ==
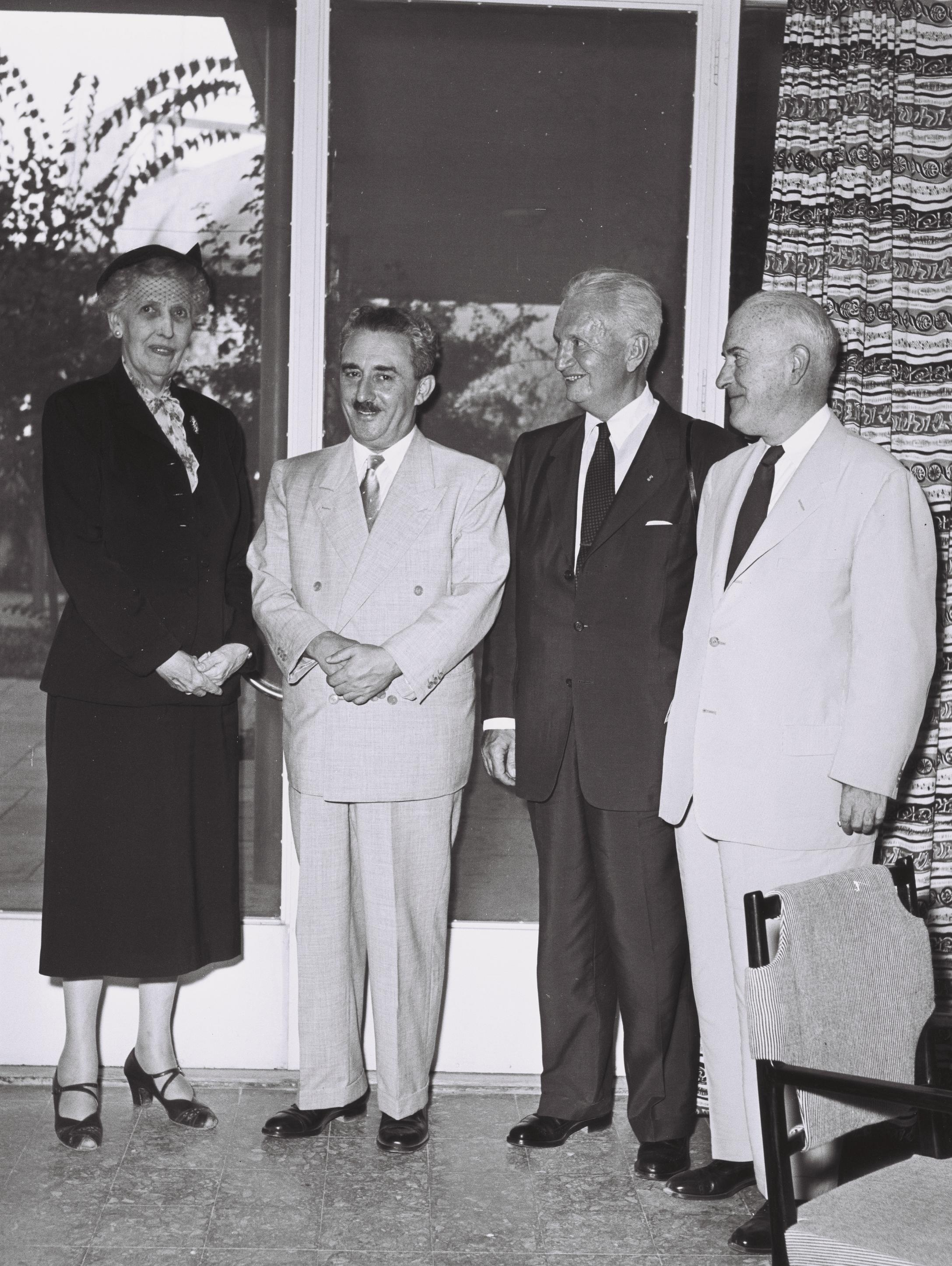
Thompson, Moshe Sharett (Israel's Foreign Minister), and members of Congress Francis Walter and John J. Rooney, 1955

== Early life and education ==
Thompson was born in Whitehall, Michigan, and attended the public schools. She graduated from Muskegon Business College of nearby Muskegon in 1905, and became a lawyer with a private practice.

== Early career ==
She was registrar of probate court of Muskegon County. In 1924, Thompson was the first women judge elected to a position in the probate court in Muskegon, Michigan. Thompson served in this role from 1925 to 1937. She gained national recognition as an advocate for children's rights during that period. She was elected the county's first female state representative in 1938 and served as a member of the Michigan House of Representatives (Muskegon County 1st district) from 1939 to 1941.

Thompson then served on the Social Security Board, 1941–1942; staff for United States Labor Department, 1942; United States Adjutant General's Office, 1942–1946; and then member and chair of the Michigan state Prison Commission for Women. During and after World War II she worked as a civilian employee of the U.S. Army in Washington, D.C., and in Europe.

== Congress ==
In 1950, Thompson was elected as a Republican from Michigan's 9th congressional district to the 82nd Congress and subsequently re-elected to the two succeeding Congresses serving from January 3, 1951, to January 3, 1957, in the U.S. House. She was the first woman to represent Michigan in Congress and the first woman to serve on the House Judiciary Committee.

On February 26, 1954, Thompson introduced legislation to ban mailing "obscene, lewd, lascivious or filthy" phonograph (rock and roll) records.

She was an unsuccessful candidate for re-nomination to the 85th Congress in 1956, being defeated by fellow Republican Robert P. Griffin and returned to her home in Whitehall.

== Death ==
Ruth Thompson died in Plainwell Sanitorium in Allegan County, Michigan, and was interred in Oakhurst Cemetery of Whitehall.

== See also ==
- Women in the United States House of Representatives

U.S. House of Representatives
Preceded by Albert J. Engel	United States Representative for the 9th congressional district of Michigan; 1951–1957	Succeeded by Robert P. Griffin
