= Horatio N. Hovey House =

- U.S. National Register of Historic Places
- Michigan State Historic Site
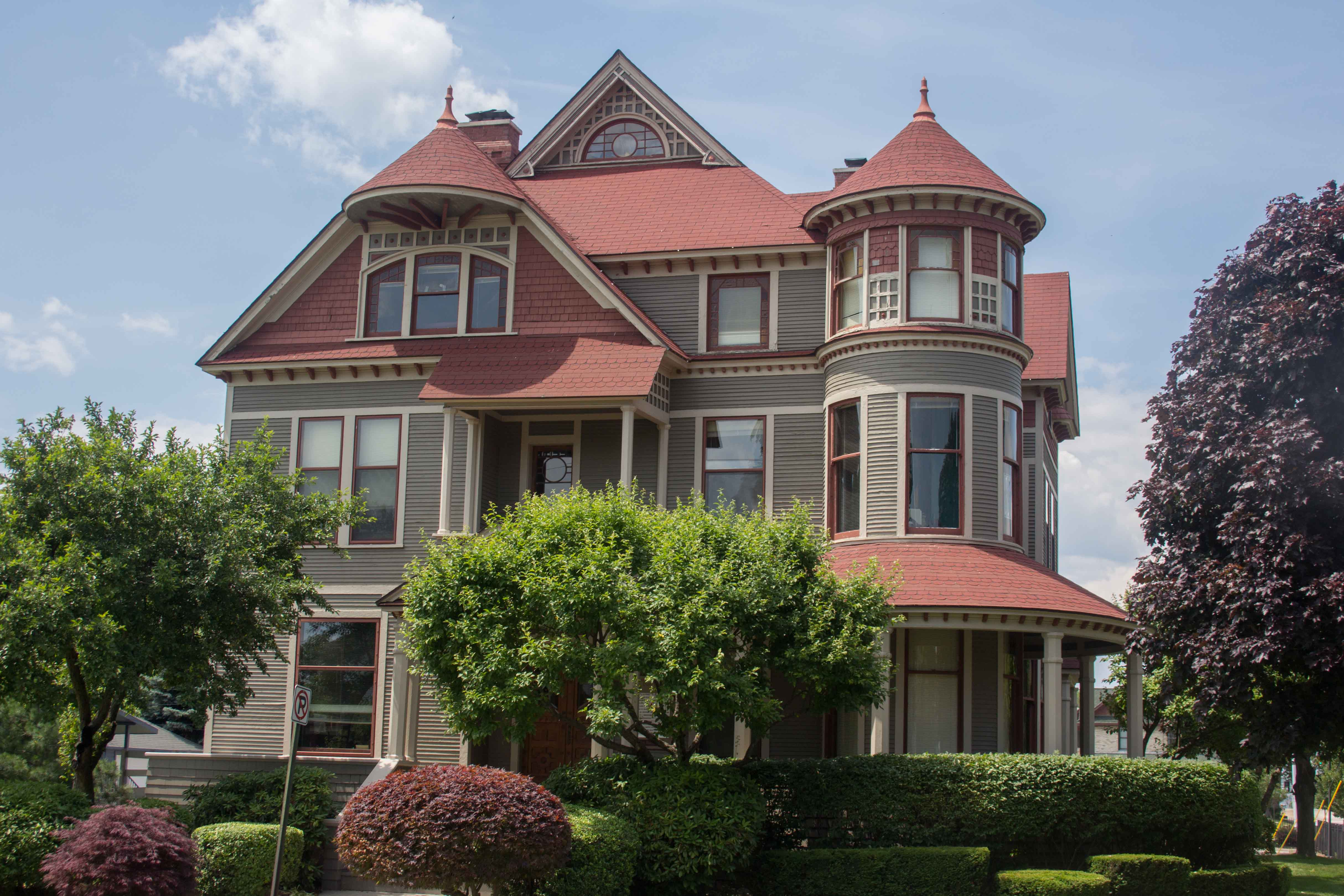

- Location within Michigan Location within the United States
- Interactive map showing the location of Horatio N. Hovey House
- Location: 318 Houston Ave., Muskegon, Michigan
- Coordinates: 43°13′53″N 86°15′5″W
- Area: less than one acre
- Built: 1889
- Architectural style: Queen Anne
- NRHP reference No.: 83000887
- Added to NRHP: September 8, 1983

The Horatio N. Hovey House is a private house located at 318 Houston Avenue in Muskegon, Michigan. It was listed on the National Register of Historic Places in 1983.

== History ==
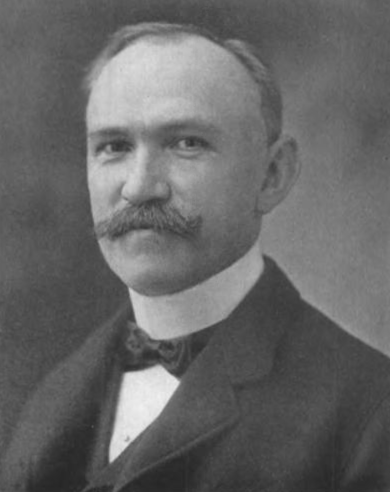
Horatio N. Hovey

Horatio N. Hovey was born in 1853 in Oakland County, Michigan. In 1867 the family moved to Muskegon, and Horatio began work in a local grocery store. The next year he began working at the Post Office, where he worked until 1875. That year, using money he had saved, Hovey went into business with Elias W. Merrill, establishing a hardware firm under the name of Merrill and Hovey. In 1881 Hovey partnered with J.B. McCracken to open a sawmill, and the two ran a successful limbering business for the next 18 years.

While working at the post office, Hovey Hovey met Nellie Merrill, daughter of then-Postmaster Elias W. Merrill. The two were married in 1874, and eventually had four children. In 1889, the couple built this Queen Anne house for their family. In November 1903, Horatio Hovey merged his lumber operations with those of T.C. Starret, and moved his family to Detroit.

Hovey sold his house in 1903, after which it was used as a private residence, then as a home for delinquent boys, a dress shop, a restaurant known as the Houston House Restaurant and Banquet Room, and a ladies' tea room. In 1979, the Hovey House was purchased by Mills Property Management Corporation, and in 1984 the house was restored and converted into office space. In 1998 the house was purchased by Frederick and Ann Bleakley, who opened the Bleakley Law Offices in the building.

Hovey was sold again in July 2026 to Mary C Hames, who continues to use it as commercial office space.

== Description ==
The Horatio N. Hovey House is an asymmetrical two-and-one-half story Queen Anne structure with a rough-faced stone foundation. The front facade has a recessed bay containing the main entrance in the center, a gable-roofed bay to the left, and a rounded tower to the right. A wrap-around porch stretches from the entryway around the tower and along the side of the house. A small porch is above the entryway, and the upper portion of the house has decorative Queen Anne elements including wood shingles and decorative wood panels. The elaborate roofline is formed from a combination of jerkin head, conical, gabled, and hipped roofs, as well as additional brackets, finials.

On the interior of the house, the first floor contains a wide center hall, around which are two formal parlors, a library / study, stairs, and dining room. A kitchen, pantry, and other service areas are located at the rear. The second floor has another wide hall, seven bedrooms, and a bath. The third floor has four large rooms.

The most notable feature of the hone is the fine woodwork throughout the house. The hallways and major public rooms contain wainscotting with carved insets and moldings. The main stairway features a spoked panel braced between turned balusters. Frames around the windows, doors, and fireplace have elaborately detailed and frames, with a molded and carved top rail.
