= White River (White Lake) =

River in Michigan, United States

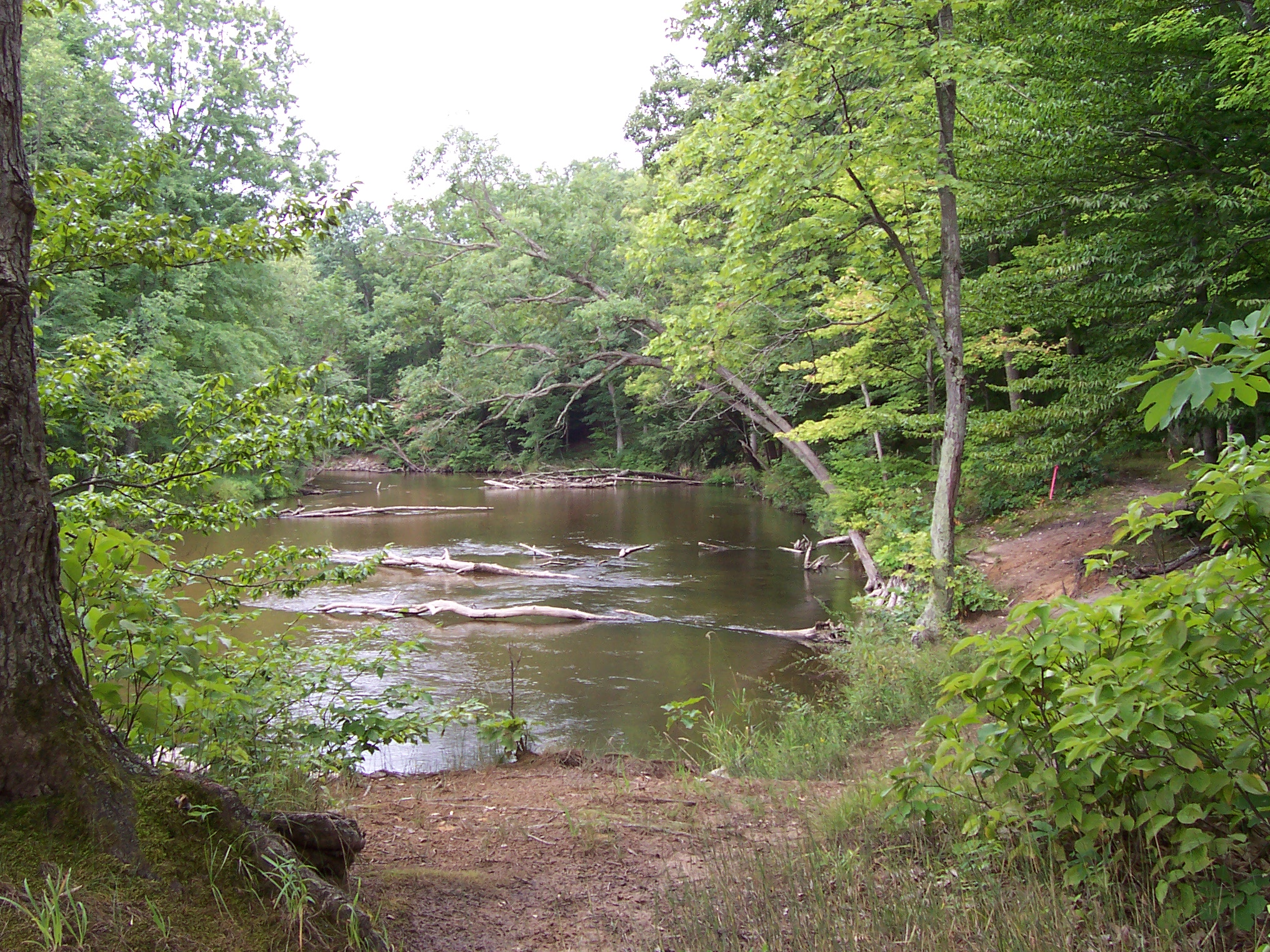

Physical characteristics
- Source
  - location: Monroe Township, Newago County, Michigan
  - coordinates: 43.68001°N 85.7381°W
- Mouth
  - location: White Lake, Michigan
  - coordinates: 43.42251°N 86.33701°W
- Basin size: 470 sq mi (1,200 km^{2})
- Discharge
  - average: 450 cu ft/s (13 m^{3}/s)
  - minimum: 220 cu ft/s (6.2 m^{3}/s)
  - maximum: 1,834 cu ft/s (51.9 m^{3}/s)

Basin features
- Cities: White Cloud, Hesperia, Whitehall
- Population: 48,000

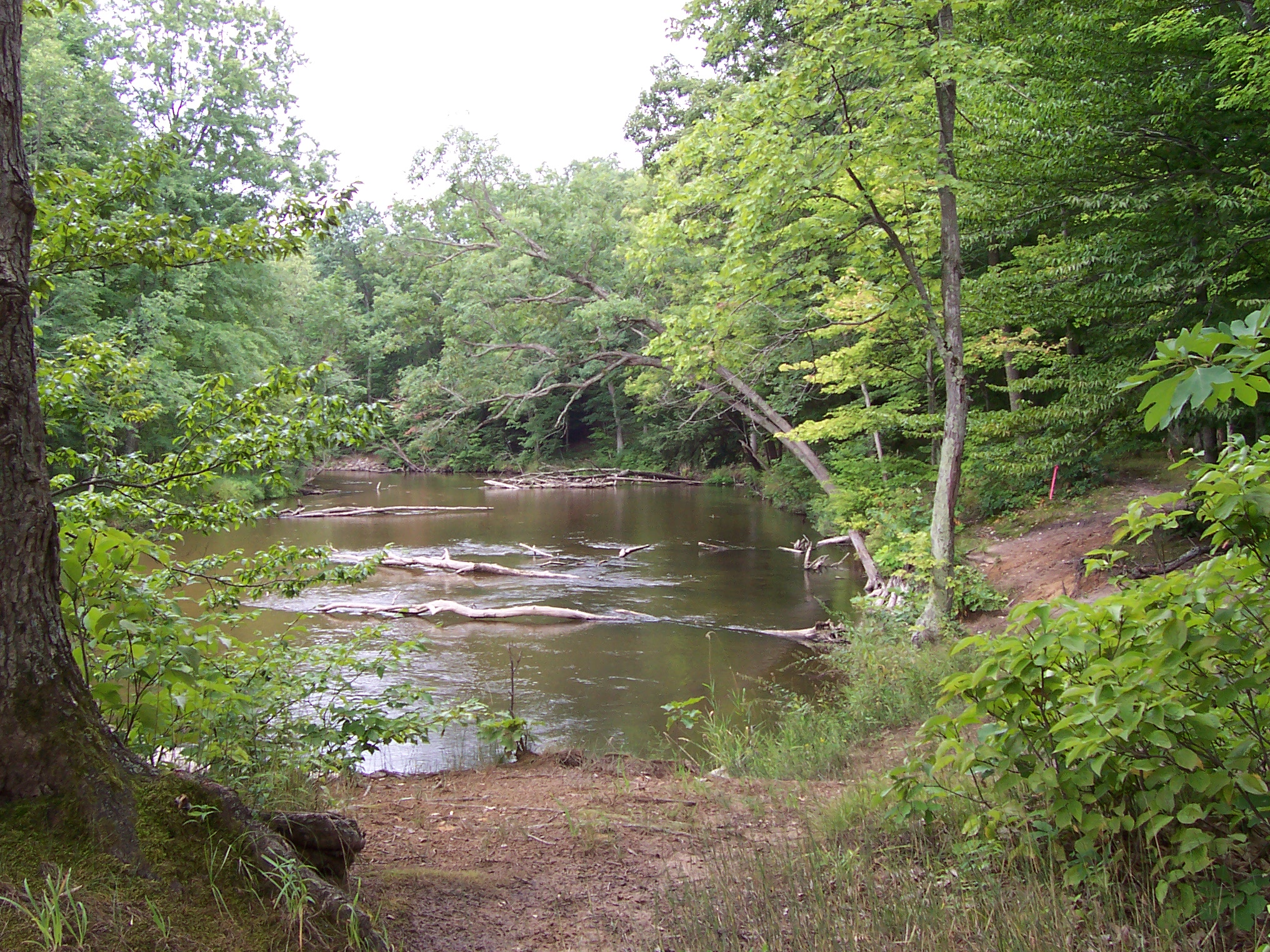
The White River in August 2005

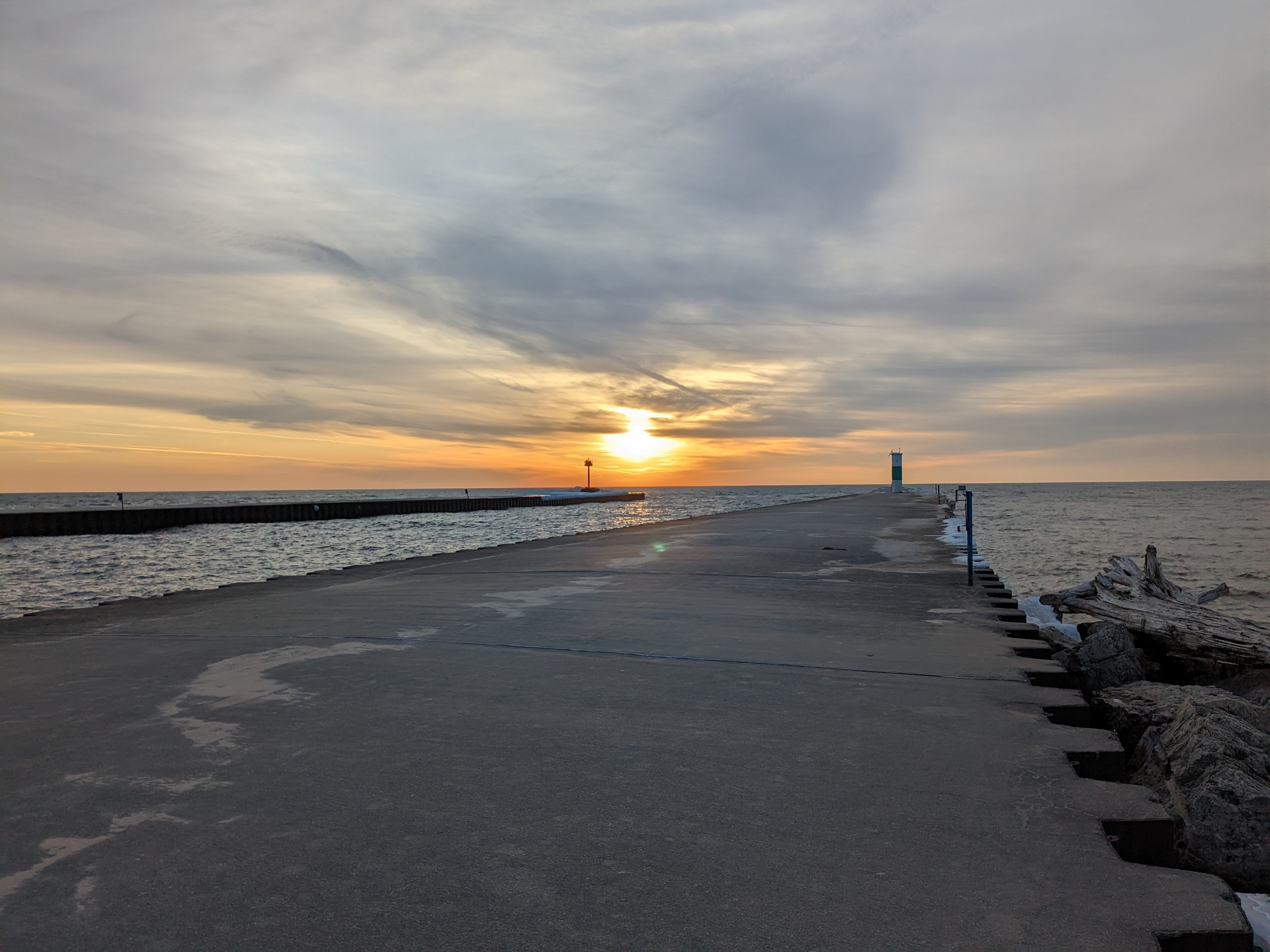
The White River 'Mouth' on Lake Michigan in White River Township

The White River (Ottawa: Wabigungweshcupago, "White Clay River") is a 23.6-mile-long (38.0 km) river located on the western side of the Lower Peninsula of the U.S. state of Michigan. Its source is the Oxford Swamp in Newaygo County. The rural town of Hesperia borders the river.

Continuing onward, the White River flows in a southwesterly direction through the southern section of Manistee National Forest. The river passes through Oceana County and into Muskegon County and White Lake. The lake and river discharge into Lake Michigan, near the towns of Whitehall and Montague.

The White River system drains a surface area of approximately 300,000 acres (1,200 km^{2}) and includes about 253 miles (407 km) of streams.

The river has a large population of wild brook trout, which have not been fished for much of its length. It is very common to only find fish eight inches or longer. The population is healthy and regularly produces large, even trophy trout. The trout prefer to feed on creek chubs and flies, and take to lure imitations very well.

The White River is designated as a State of Michigan Natural River, which includes a special zoning overlay preventing land development from occurring within 400 feet of the riverbank.

== Bridges ==
List of Bridge Crossings on White River
Route	Type	City	County	Location
Dowling Street	City Street	Whitehall / Montague	Muskegon	
Whitehall Rail Trail	Non-Motorized Vehicles	Whitehall / Montague	Muskegon	
US-31	US Route	Whitehall / Montague	Muskegon	
East Fruitvale Road	County Road		Muskegon	
East Garfield Road	County Road		Oceana	
East Hawley Avenue	County Road		Oceana	
M-20	Michigan Highway		Oceana	43°34′20.00″N 86°2′36.62″W
West Michigan Avenue	County Road	Hesperia	Newaygo	
North Maple Island Road	County Road	Hesperia	Newaygo	
Fitzgerald Avenue	County Road		Newaygo	
Green Avenue	County Road		Newaygo	
Luce Avenue	County Road		Newaygo	
M-20	Michigan Highway		Newaygo	
North Baldwin Avenue	County Road		Newaygo	
Bingham Avenue	County Road		Newaygo	
Echo Drive	County Road	White Cloud	Newaygo	
M-37	Michigan Highway	White Cloud	Newaygo	

== See also ==
- List of rivers of Michigan
