= Actors' Colony =

Theater group

- Formation: June 14, 1908
- Dissolved: 1938
- Type: Theatre group
- Purpose: Vaudeville, theater
- Location: Bluffton, Michigan
- Members: Over 200
- Website: actorscolony.com

Actors' Colony was a community for theatrical and vaudeville performers conceived by C.S. "Pop" Ford and located in Bluffton, near Muskegon, Michigan and Lake Michigan. Originally called the Artists' Colony Club, and it was founded on June 14, 1908, with Joe Keaton, father of Buster Keaton, as president. Vaudevillians Paul Lucier, and William "Mush" Rawls were vice president and treasurer/secretary, respectively.

The Actors' Colony ended operations in 1938.

== History ==
In the early 20th century, the area of Muskegon, Michigan was a popular vaudeville stop at a summer show house at nearby Lake Michigan Park. One of those early visitors was Joe Keaton, who, along with his family, made Bluffton an annual summer retreat in a cottage on a sand dune known as Pigeon Hill. From 1908 and continuing through 1917, Keaton, and his family of five, including wife, Myra, and son Joseph (nicknamed Buster), not only performed their family vaudeville show in the Muskegon area, but settled into this home on the shore of adjoining Muskegon Lake. According to Buster's wife, Eleanor, this was the famous silent picture actor's "favorite place on earth".

A year after he arrived in the area, Joe Keaton along with C.S. "Pop" Ford, conceived the idea of a permanent facility for road-wary vaudevillians looking to settle in one spot. Originally, the locals organized a one-story clubhouse nicknamed Cobwebs and Rafters - a reference to its unfinished state - along the Muskegon Lake shoreline. The site property was donated by Lew Earl, one of the first performers to make Muskegon his permanent summer home. Another favorite hangout was Pascoe's Place, a local bar famous for its perch and nickel beers

Keaton and Earl sold plots of land to fellow performers, who then built cottages where they could come and relax in the summers while working on their acts to take on tour the following year. By 1911, more than 200 theater and vaudeville performers resided in the Actors' Colony settlement in Bluffton. Most of the cottages sat on a stretch of land facing Lake Michigan or Muskegon Lake. Some of the personalities living there included "Happy Jack" Gardner, Dick Dixon, George Pearl, Joseph Roberts and many more. It was a common sight to see among the performers someone like Max Gruber, who brought his trained animals, including his elephant, zebra or dog around the neighborhood.

By 1916, the Actors' Club chose to build a new facility to replace the small clubhouse. Christened the Theatrical Colony Yacht Club, the group staged an annual event, whereby the denizens of the Actors' Colony would perform, and sponsored a summer regatta, featuring boat races on the lakes.

By 1918, films began replacing vaudeville for entertainment. As a result, visits to the Actors' Colony declined. Some members would move on, never to return, while others would retire from the road and live out their lives in the area. Eventually the Colony dissolved. Many of the homes and landmarks remain in Bluffton.
