= White River Township, Michigan =

- Township
- Location within Michigan Location within the United States
- Coordinates: 43°25′36″N 86°25′16″W
- Country: United States
- State: Michigan
- County: Muskegon

Area
  - Total: 16.47 sq mi (42.7 km^{2})
  - Land: 15.84 sq mi (41.0 km^{2})
  - Water: 0.63 sq mi (1.6 km^{2})
- Elevation: 643 ft (196 m)

Population (2020)
  - Total: 1,383
  - Density: 87.3/sq mi (33.7/km^{2})
- Time zone: UTC-5 (Eastern (EST))
  - Summer (DST): UTC-4 (EDT)
- ZIP Code: 49437 (Montague)
- FIPS code: 26-121-86980
- GNIS feature ID: 1627267
- Website: whiterivertwp.com

White River Township is a civil township of Muskegon County in the U.S. state of Michigan. The population was 1,383 at the 2020 census.

== Geography ==
The township is in the northwest corner of Muskegon County, bordered to the north by Oceana County and to the west by Lake Michigan. The center of the township is 5 miles (8 km) west of the city of Montague and 23 miles (37 km) by road northwest of Muskegon, the county seat.

According to the U.S. Census Bureau, the township has a total area of 16.5 square miles (43 km^{2}), of which 15.8 square miles (41 km^{2}) are land and 0.6 square miles (1.6 km^{2}), or 3.83%, are water. Part of White Lake, an arm of Lake Michigan, is on the southern border of the township.

== Demographics ==
Historical population
Census	Pop.	Note	%±
1860	374		—
1870	610		63.1%
1880	508		−16.7%
1890	633		24.6%
1900	574		−9.3%
1910	461		−19.7%
1920	380		−17.6%
1930	308		−18.9%
1940	389		26.3%
1950	492		26.5%
1960	675		37.2%
1970	1,016		50.5%
1980	1,215		19.6%
1990	1,250		2.9%
2000	1,338		7.0%
2010	1,335		−0.2%
2020	1,383		3.6%
U.S. Decennial Census

As of the census of 2000, there were 1,338 people, 512 households, and 394 families residing in the township. The population density was 84.3 inhabitants per square mile (32.5/km^{2}). There were 779 housing units at an average density of 49.1 per square mile (19.0/km^{2}). The racial makeup of the township was 97.83% White, 0.37% African American, 0.75% Native American, 0.22% Asian, 0.07% from other races, and 0.75% from two or more races. Hispanic or Latino of any race were 2.62% of the population.

There were 512 households, out of which 29.9% had children under the age of 18 living with them, 68.9% were married couples living together, 6.1% had a female householder with no husband present, and 23.0% were non-families. 19.9% of all households were made up of individuals, and 8.8% had someone living alone who was 65 years of age or older. The average household size was 2.57 and the average family size was 2.94.

In the township the population was spread out, with 23.8% under the age of 18, 5.3% from 18 to 24, 22.9% from 25 to 44, 30.1% from 45 to 64, and 17.9% who were 65 years of age or older. The median age was 44 years. For every 100 females, there were 96.8 males. For every 100 females age 18 and over, there were 95.6 males.

The median income for a household in the township was $48,077, and the median income for a family was $56,029. Males had a median income of $40,313 versus $25,234 for females. The per capita income for the township was $21,797. About 2.3% of families and 6.3% of the population were below the poverty line, including 6.6% of those under age 18 and 14.3% of those age 65 or over.
