= Montague, Michigan =

- City
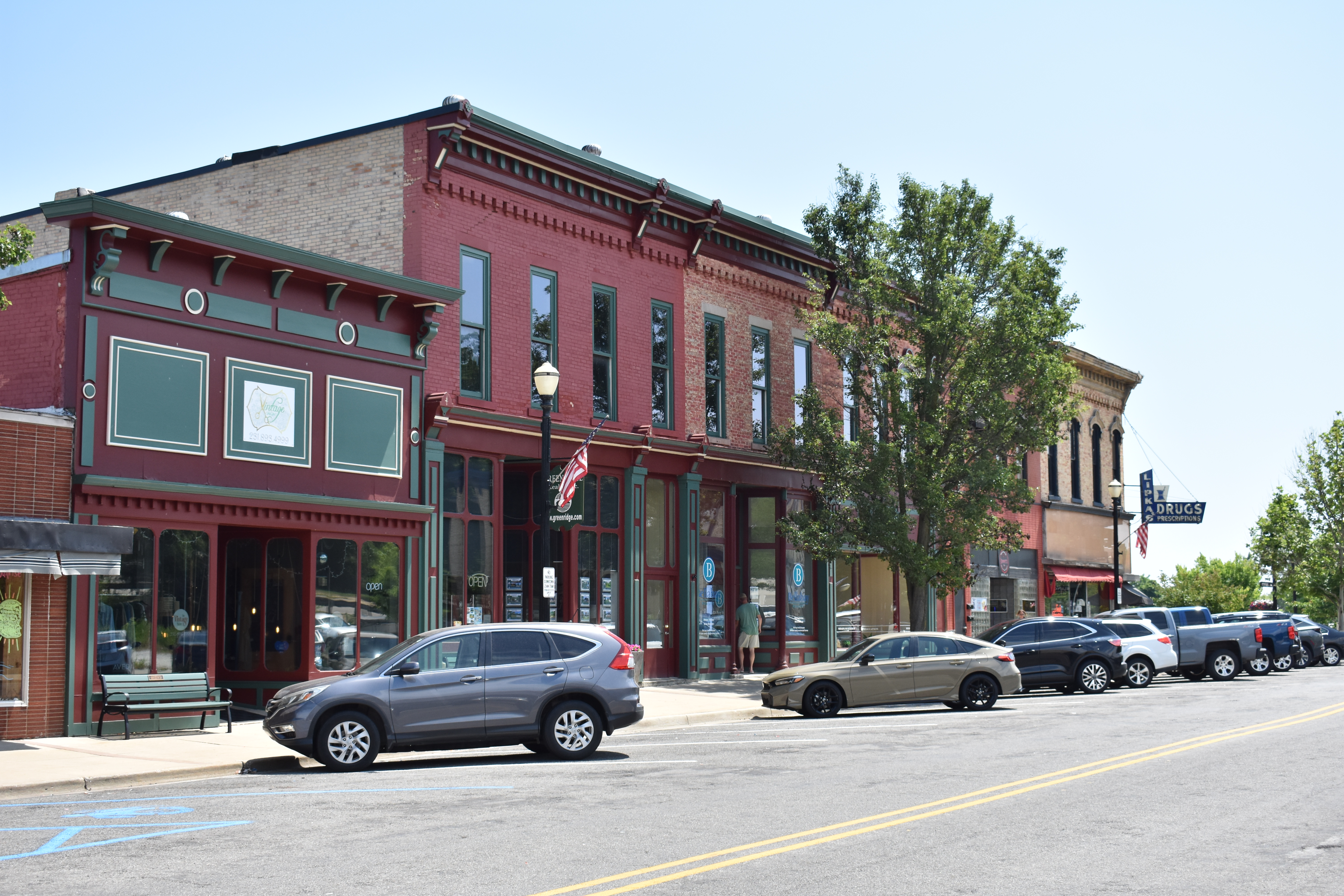
- Montague in July 2026

- Location within Muskegon County and the state of Michigan
- Coordinates: 43°25′N 86°21′W
- Country: United States
- State: Michigan
- County: Muskegon

Government
  - Type: Commission-Manager
  - Mayor: Tom Lohman
  - City Manager: Jeff Auch
  - City Clerk: Kelly Markley
  - City Treasurer: Melissa Beegle

Area
  - Total: 3.14 sq mi (8.14 km^{2})
  - Land: 2.63 sq mi (6.81 km^{2})
  - Water: 0.51 sq mi (1.33 km^{2})
- Elevation: 636 ft (194 m)

Population (2020)
  - Total: 2,417
  - Density: 919.9/sq mi (355.17/km^{2})
- Time zone: UTC-5 (EST)
  - Summer (DST): UTC-4 (EDT)
- ZIP code: 49437
- Area code: 231
- FIPS code: 26-55100
- GNIS feature ID: 1620880
- Website: cityofmontague.org

Montague is a city in Muskegon County, Michigan, United States. The population was 2,417 at the 2020 census. The city is politically independent from Montague Township, which borders it on three sides.

== History ==
Noah Ferry founded the city, naming it in honor of his father, William Montague Ferry, who founded the cities of Grand Haven and Ferrysburg in neighboring Ottawa County. Ferry Church, built in 1874, is named in honor of Noah Henry Ferry, who died fighting for the Union at the Battle of Gettysburg in 1863.

At one time, Ferry Street, also named for the founder, was the main street through town. It was named for him because the city's post office operated on that street following its establishment in 1867, and Ferry was instrumental in getting a post office in the city. Although city hall, the city's new post office (constructed in 2005), and a handful of businesses still operate on Ferry, Dowling Street has become the city's main route because of its eventual connection to neighboring communities and U.S. Highway 31.

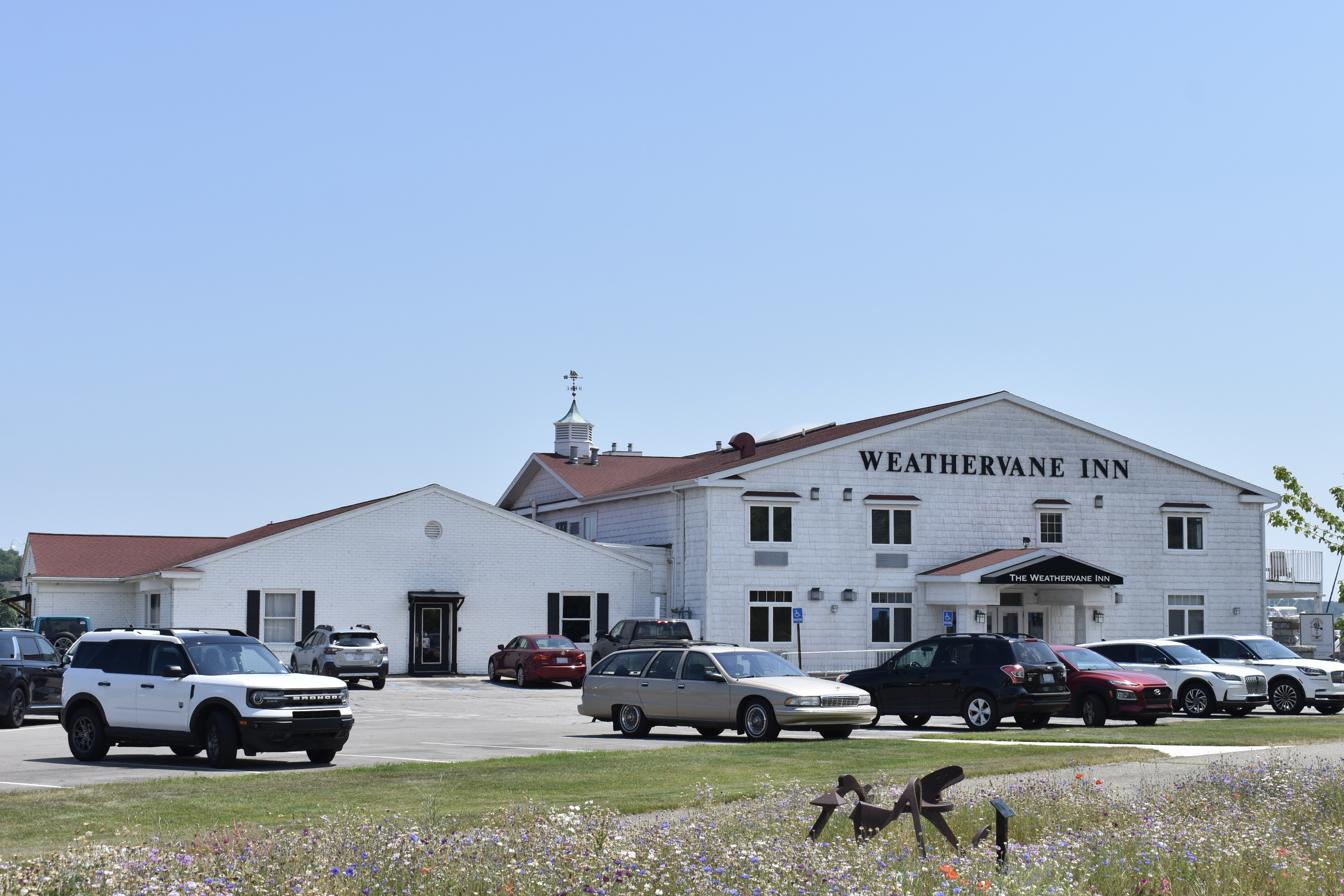
The Weathervane Inn in Montague

Montague is home to the "World's Largest Working Weathervane", which was constructed in part by local manufacturer Whitehall Metal Studios. The weathervane is topped by the Ella Ellenwood, a lumbering schooner that frequented White Lake transporting lumber from Montague to Milwaukee, Wisconsin. The ship became infamous after it sank in a storm in 1901, and the wooden nameplate of the schooner floated back to the shores of Montague, where it was found in 1902. Many people believed that the boat was coming home, and as a result the ship is frequently associated with the city.

== Geography ==
Montague is in northwestern Muskegon County, bordered to the west, north, and northeast by Montague Township and to the southeast by the city of Whitehall. The upstream end of White Lake, a water body connected to Lake Michigan, separates the two cities. Montague is 16 miles (26 km) north of Muskegon, the county seat.

According to the U.S. Census Bureau, the city of Montague has a total area of 3.14 square miles (8.13 km^{2}), of which 2.63 square miles (6.81 km^{2}) are land and 0.52 square miles (1.35 km^{2}), or 16.4%, are water.

The Montague ZIP code 49437 serves all of Montague city, Montague Township and White River Township, as well as small portions of Whitehall Township and Blue Lake Township in Muskegon County and parts of Claybanks Township and Grant Township in Oceana County.

The city is at the southern end of the Hart-Montague Trail, a paved cycling and multiuse trail which attracts visitors during the warm months to Montague, Hart, and the small towns and businesses in between.

=== Climate ===
This climatic region is typified by large seasonal temperature differences, with warm to hot (and often humid) summers and cold (sometimes severely cold) winters. According to the Köppen Climate Classification system, Montague has a humid continental climate, abbreviated "Dfb" on climate maps.

Climate data for Montague 4 NW, Michigan (1991–2020 normals, extremes 1893–present)
Month	Jan	Feb	Mar	Apr	May	Jun	Jul	Aug	Sep	Oct	Nov	Dec	Year
Record high °F (°C)	59 (15)	65 (18)	80 (27)	84 (29)	94 (34)	98 (37)	96 (36)	97 (36)	96 (36)	85 (29)	74 (23)	64 (18)	98 (37)
Mean maximum °F (°C)	48.2 (9.0)	49.1 (9.5)	62.8 (17.1)	73.5 (23.1)	81.9 (27.7)	87.0 (30.6)	87.4 (30.8)	86.3 (30.2)	84.2 (29.0)	74.6 (23.7)	61.5 (16.4)	50.7 (10.4)	89.3 (31.8)
Mean daily maximum °F (°C)	30.2 (−1.0)	32.4 (0.2)	42.1 (5.6)	55.2 (12.9)	66.6 (19.2)	75.3 (24.1)	79.3 (26.3)	77.9 (25.5)	71.6 (22.0)	58.5 (14.7)	45.4 (7.4)	34.9 (1.6)	55.8 (13.2)
Daily mean °F (°C)	24.4 (−4.2)	25.6 (−3.6)	33.6 (0.9)	44.7 (7.1)	55.1 (12.8)	64.4 (18.0)	68.7 (20.4)	67.6 (19.8)	61.2 (16.2)	50.0 (10.0)	38.9 (3.8)	29.7 (−1.3)	47.0 (8.3)
Mean daily minimum °F (°C)	18.6 (−7.4)	18.8 (−7.3)	25.0 (−3.9)	34.2 (1.2)	43.6 (6.4)	53.4 (11.9)	58.0 (14.4)	57.2 (14.0)	50.7 (10.4)	41.4 (5.2)	32.3 (0.2)	24.5 (−4.2)	38.1 (3.4)
Mean minimum °F (°C)	−3.6 (−19.8)	−1.9 (−18.8)	5.0 (−15.0)	17.7 (−7.9)	28.0 (−2.2)	36.7 (2.6)	43.9 (6.6)	43.3 (6.3)	33.5 (0.8)	24.4 (−4.2)	18.2 (−7.7)	6.6 (−14.1)	−7.7 (−22.1)
Record low °F (°C)	−21 (−29)	−27 (−33)	−17 (−27)	−8 (−22)	18 (−8)	23 (−5)	32 (0)	32 (0)	24 (−4)	14 (−10)	−14 (−26)	−15 (−26)	−27 (−33)
Average precipitation inches (mm)	2.60 (66)	1.37 (35)	2.28 (58)	3.84 (98)	3.35 (85)	3.32 (84)	2.98 (76)	3.29 (84)	3.18 (81)	4.06 (103)	3.15 (80)	1.77 (45)	35.19 (894)
Average snowfall inches (cm)	26.0 (66)	13.8 (35)	6.7 (17)	1.7 (4.3)	0.0 (0.0)	0.0 (0.0)	0.0 (0.0)	0.0 (0.0)	0.0 (0.0)	0.1 (0.25)	4.7 (12)	15.9 (40)	68.9 (175)
Average extreme snow depth inches (cm)	12.8 (33)	12.0 (30)	7.1 (18)	0.9 (2.3)	0.0 (0.0)	0.0 (0.0)	0.0 (0.0)	0.0 (0.0)	0.0 (0.0)	0.0 (0.0)	2.5 (6.4)	7.9 (20)	15.3 (39)
Average precipitation days (≥ 0.01 in)	9.6	7.0	8.2	10.1	10.8	9.4	8.0	8.2	9.2	10.9	10.1	8.7	110.2
Average snowy days (≥ 0.1 in)	10.8	6.2	2.8	0.8	0.0	0.0	0.0	0.0	0.0	0.1	2.4	7.3	30.4
Source: NOAA

== Demographics ==
Historical population
Census	Pop.	Note	%±
1880	1,297		—
1890	1,623		25.1%
1900	998		−38.5%
1910	942		−5.6%
1920	845		−10.3%
1930	887		5.0%
1940	1,099		23.9%
1950	1,530		39.2%
1960	2,366		54.6%
1970	2,396		1.3%
1980	2,332		−2.7%
1990	2,276		−2.4%
2000	2,407		5.8%
2010	2,361		−1.9%
2020	2,417		2.4%
U.S. Decennial Census

=== 2020 census ===
As of the 2020 census, Montague had a population of 2,417. The median age was 44.1 years. 22.7% of residents were under the age of 18 and 22.3% of residents were 65 years of age or older. For every 100 females there were 88.8 males, and for every 100 females age 18 and over there were 83.6 males age 18 and over.

95.0% of residents lived in urban areas, while 5.0% lived in rural areas.

There were 1,073 households in Montague, of which 28.9% had children under the age of 18 living in them. Of all households, 43.5% were married-couple households, 16.9% were households with a male householder and no spouse or partner present, and 33.2% were households with a female householder and no spouse or partner present. About 34.8% of all households were made up of individuals and 20.6% had someone living alone who was 65 years of age or older.

There were 1,193 housing units, of which 10.1% were vacant. The homeowner vacancy rate was 0.6% and the rental vacancy rate was 1.4%.

Racial composition as of the 2020 census
Race	Number	Percent
White	2,200	91.0%
Black or African American	12	0.5%
American Indian and Alaska Native	16	0.7%
Asian	8	0.3%
Native Hawaiian and Other Pacific Islander	0	0.0%
Some other race	18	0.7%
Two or more races	163	6.7%
Hispanic or Latino (of any race)	125	5.2%

=== 2010 census ===
As of the census of 2010, there were 2,361 people, 1,006 households, and 643 families residing in the city. The population density was 922.3 inhabitants per square mile (356.1/km^{2}). There were 1,182 housing units at an average density of 461.7 per square mile (178.3/km^{2}). The racial makeup of the city was 96.0% White, 0.6% African American, 1.0% Native American, 0.3% Asian, 0.4% from other races, and 1.6% from two or more races. Hispanic or Latino of any race were 3.4% of the population.

There were 1,006 households, of which 31.9% had children under the age of 18 living with them, 46.9% were married couples living together, 13.1% had a female householder with no husband present, 3.9% had a male householder with no wife present, and 36.1% were non-families. 30.8% of all households were made up of individuals, and 14.5% had someone living alone who was 65 years of age or older. The average household size was 2.35 and the average family size was 2.93.

The median age in the city was 39.9 years. 25.2% of residents were under the age of 18; 7.4% were between the ages of 18 and 24; 23.2% were from 25 to 44; 28.1% were from 45 to 64; and 16.1% were 65 years of age or older. The gender makeup of the city was 46.0% male and 54.0% female.

=== 2000 census ===
As of the census of 2000, there were 2,407 people, 990 households, and 667 families residing in the city. The population density was 905.1 inhabitants per square mile (349.5/km^{2}). There were 1,075 housing units at an average density of 404.3 per square mile (156.1/km^{2}). The racial makeup of the city was 97.17% White, 0.37% African American, 0.46% Native American, 0.25% Asian, 0.00% Pacific Islander, 0.58% from other races, and 1.16% from two or more races. 2.33% of the population were Hispanic or Latino of any race.

There were 990 households, out of which 32.1% had children under the age of 18 living with them, 51.5% were married couples living together, 12.5% had a female householder with no husband present, and 32.6% were non-families. 28.3% of all households were made up of individuals, and 11.7% had someone living alone who was 65 years of age or older. The average household size was 2.43 and the average family size was 2.97.

In the city, the population was spread out, with 26.1% under the age of 18, 8.8% from 18 to 24, 27.0% from 25 to 44, 23.7% from 45 to 64, and 14.4% who were 65 years of age or older. The median age was 37 years. For every 100 females, there were 89.8 males. For every 100 females age 18 and over, there were 87.2 males.

The median income for a household in the city was $40,677, and the median income for a family was $49,185. Males had a median income of $37,389 versus $25,282 for females. The per capita income for the city was $21,238. 9.5% of the population and 6.6% of families were below the poverty line. Out of the total population, 9.1% of those under the age of 18 and 9.3% of those 65 and older were living below the poverty line.

== Education ==
Montague Area Public Schools (MAPS) is the local school district for the city of Montague. Three of the district's five schools are located in the city, Montague High School, Nellie B. Chisholm (NBC) Middle School and R.R. Oehrli (RRO) Elementary School. The district's other two schools, Oceana High School and Rothbury Elementary are located in the Village of Rothbury. The district serves students of both Muskegon and Oceana counties. This arrangement exists after voters living in the district of Rothbury Public Schools agreed to merge with the district of Montague Public Schools. This merger of the two districts took place in the 1950s to increase efficiency and decrease costs for both communities, led to the formation of "Montague Area Public Schools".

The district serves students living in the Muskegon County communities of the city of Montague, as well as Montague and White River townships. In addition it serves students living in parts of Whitehall and Blue Lake townships. The district also serves students living in the Oceana County communities of the Village of Rothbury and Otto Township. It also serves students living in parts of New Era. Also, the district is a member of the "Muskegon County School of Choice" program; the district can serve anyone living in Muskegon County. The district has increased enrollment slightly from the program, but has limited growth in the past because the rural district has limited capacity for new enrollees.

The city of Montague is also the home of Saint James Catholic School. The small parochial school serves grades K-5 and has roughly 100 students. It serves students living in the Montague Area Public School District, as well as the Whitehall District Schools. The school shares busing with both districts, and dropped the sixth grade a few years after adding kindergarten. Recently, White Lake Baptist Academy (grades K-12) and Mouth School (grades K-8) closed because of dwindling enrollment.

== Major highways ==
- Bus. US 31 is a business loop through the downtowns of both Montague and Whitehall.
- B-15
- B-86

== Notable people ==
- Ira Flagstead, outfielder in Major League Baseball
- Nancy Fleming, Miss America 1961
- Joseph D. Leitch, U.S. Army major general
