= Fruitland Township, Michigan =

- Township
- Location within Michigan Location within the United States
- Coordinates: 43°20′39″N 86°20′30″W
- Country: United States
- State: Michigan
- County: Muskegon

Area
  - Total: 38.2 sq mi (99 km^{2})
  - Land: 36.3 sq mi (94 km^{2})
  - Water: 2.0 sq mi (5.2 km^{2})
- Elevation: 630 ft (192 m)

Population (2020)
  - Total: 5,793
  - Density: 159.8/sq mi (61.7/km^{2})
- Time zone: UTC-5 (Eastern (EST))
  - Summer (DST): UTC-4 (EDT)
- ZIP Codes: 49461 (Whitehall); 49445 (Muskegon)
- FIPS code: 26-121-30980
- GNIS feature ID: 1626324
- Website: fruitlandmi.gov

Fruitland Township is a civil township of Muskegon County in the U.S. state of Michigan. The population was 5,793 at the 2020 census.

== Geography ==
The city is located in western Muskegon County on the northern side of Muskegon Lake, an arm of Lake Michigan. It is bordered to the south, across the lake, by the city of Muskegon, the county seat. The Muskegon River flows into Muskegon Lake in the eastern part of the city. The lake's outlet channel to Lake Michigan is one mile west of the city limits.

According to the U.S. Census Bureau, North Muskegon has a total area of 4.12 square miles (10.67 km^{2}), of which 1.79 square miles (4.64 km^{2}) is land and 2.33 square miles (6.03 km^{2}), or 56.5%, is water.

== Demographics ==
Historical population
Census	Pop.	Note	%±
1870	228		—
1880	494		116.7%
1890	580		17.4%
1900	844		45.5%
1910	783		−7.2%
1920	612		−21.8%
1930	689		12.6%
1940	1,040		50.9%
1950	1,548		48.8%
1960	2,574		66.3%
1970	3,200		24.3%
1980	4,168		30.3%
1990	4,391		5.4%
2000	5,235		19.2%
2010	5,543		5.9%
2020	5,793		4.5%
U.S. Decennial Census

As of the census of 2000, there were 5,235 people, 1,859 households, and 1,492 families residing in the township. The population density was 143.4 inhabitants per square mile (55.4/km^{2}). There were 2,247 housing units at an average density of 61.5 per square mile (23.7/km^{2}). The racial makeup of the township was 96.96% White, 0.63% African American, 0.65% Native American, 0.25% Asian, 0.25% from other races, and 1.26% from two or more races. Hispanic or Latino of any race were 1.03% of the population.

There were 1,859 households, out of which 39.2% had children under the age of 18 living with them, 70.6% were married couples living together, 6.9% had a female householder with no husband present, and 19.7% were non-families. 16.5% of all households were made up of individuals, and 6.3% had someone living alone who was 65 years of age or older. The average household size was 2.81 and the average family size was 3.15.

In the township the population was spread out, with 29.0% under the age of 18, 6.2% from 18 to 24, 27.8% from 25 to 44, 27.4% from 45 to 64, and 9.7% who were 65 years of age or older. The median age was 38 years. For every 100 females, there were 99.5 males. For every 100 females age 18 and over, there were 98.1 males.

The median income for a household in the township was $53,977, and the median income for a family was $60,021. Males had a median income of $40,647 versus $28,615 for females. The per capita income for the township was $23,216. About 2.0% of families and 3.3% of the population were below the poverty line, including 4.1% of those under age 18 and 7.4% of those age 65 or over.
