= Whitehall, Michigan =

- City
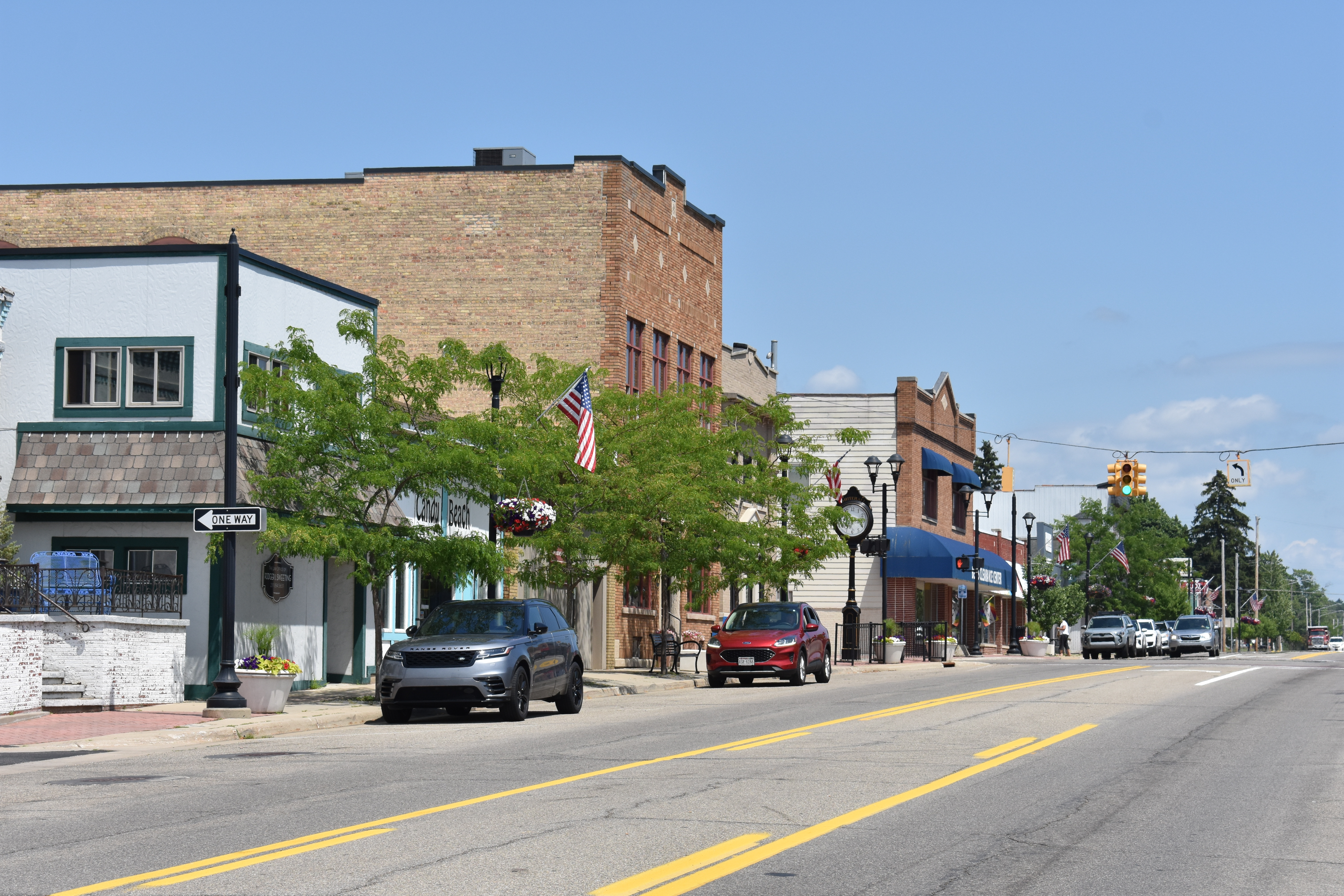
- Whitehall in July 2026

- Location in Muskegon County and the state of Michigan
- Coordinates: 43°24′36″N 86°20′55″W
- Country: United States
- State: Michigan
- County: Muskegon

Government
  - Type: Commission-Manager
  - Mayor: Tom Ziemer
  - City Manager: Daniel Tavernier

Area
  - Total: 3.80 sq mi (9.84 km^{2})
  - Land: 3.22 sq mi (8.33 km^{2})
  - Water: 0.58 sq mi (1.51 km^{2})
- Elevation: 607 ft (185 m)

Population (2020)
  - Total: 2,909
  - Density: 905/sq mi (349.3/km^{2})
- Time zone: UTC-5 (Eastern (EST))
  - Summer (DST): UTC-4 (EDT)
- ZIP codes: 49461, 49463
- Area code: 231
- FIPS code: 26-86780
- GNIS feature ID: 1622149
- Website: www.cityofwhitehall.org

Whitehall is a city in Muskegon County in the U.S. state of Michigan. The population was 2,909 at the 2020 census. The city is located to the west of Whitehall Township. Montague is its neighbor.

== History ==
It is located on White Lake (actually the mouth of the White River). Whitehall's recorded history circa 1859 when Charles Mears, a noted lumber baron to the area, platted the village along with Giles B. Slocum, naming it "Mears". The population continued to grow due to its strategic location for floating and distributing lumber.

In 1862, it was renamed "Whitehall" and incorporated as a village in 1867. It was incorporated as a city in 1943.

== Geography ==
Whitehall is in northwestern Muskegon County, about 5 miles (8.0 km) inland from Lake Michigan. White Lake originally emptied into Lake Michigan through a natural channel (see Logging the White: The White Lake Lumber Industry: 1837-1900 by Daniel J. Yakes, Ph. D. and Steven S. Demos, M.D.[Montague, Michigan: Looking Aft Publications, 2010], p 2). It is now connected to Lake Michigan by a dredged canal. The city is bordered to the west, across White Lake, by the city of Montague. Montague Township is to the north, Whitehall Township is to the east, and Fruitland Township is to the south.

According to the U.S. Census Bureau, Whitehall has a total area of 3.80 square miles (9.84 km^{2}), of which 3.22 square miles (8.34 km^{2}) are land and 0.58 square miles (1.50 km^{2}), or 15.3%, are water. The White River enters White Lake between the cities of Whitehall and Montague. The White River is nearly 24 miles (39 km) in length and passes through White Lake before emptying into Lake Michigan. In 1675, Jacques Marquette stopped in the area and learned that the Native Americans called the stream Wabish-Sippe, meaning "the river with white clay in the water", which gave rise to the names of White River and White Lake.

== Major highways ==
- US 31, a four-lane freeway, crosses the northeast corner of the city, leading south 16 miles (26 km) to Muskegon and north 43 miles (69 km) to Ludington.
- Bus. US 31 is a business loop through the downtowns of both Whitehall and Montague.

== Demographics ==
Historical population
Census	Pop.	Note	%±
1870	842		—
1880	1,724		104.8%
1890	1,903		10.4%
1900	1,481		−22.2%
1910	1,437		−3.0%
1920	1,230		−14.4%
1930	1,394		13.3%
1940	1,407		0.9%
1950	1,819		29.3%
1960	2,590		42.4%
1970	3,017		16.5%
1980	2,856		−5.3%
1990	3,027		6.0%
2000	2,884		−4.7%
2010	2,706		−6.2%
2020	2,909		7.5%
U.S. Decennial Census

=== 2020 census ===
As of the 2020 census, Whitehall had a population of 2,909. The median age was 46.0 years. 21.0% of residents were under the age of 18 and 25.4% of residents were 65 years of age or older. For every 100 females there were 89.0 males, and for every 100 females age 18 and over there were 85.6 males age 18 and over.

98.2% of residents lived in urban areas, while 1.8% lived in rural areas.

There were 1,276 households in Whitehall, of which 26.4% had children under the age of 18 living in them. Of all households, 39.3% were married-couple households, 18.7% were households with a male householder and no spouse or partner present, and 35.9% were households with a female householder and no spouse or partner present. About 38.1% of all households were made up of individuals and 21.2% had someone living alone who was 65 years of age or older.

There were 1,378 housing units, of which 7.4% were vacant. The homeowner vacancy rate was 2.0% and the rental vacancy rate was 2.8%.

Racial composition as of the 2020 census
Race	Number	Percent
White	2,642	90.8%
Black or African American	37	1.3%
American Indian and Alaska Native	8	0.3%
Asian	18	0.6%
Native Hawaiian and Other Pacific Islander	0	0.0%
Some other race	34	1.2%
Two or more races	170	5.8%
Hispanic or Latino (of any race)	131	4.5%

=== 2010 census ===
As of the census of 2010, there were 2,706 people, 1,153 households, and 678 families living in the city. The population density was 867.3 inhabitants per square mile (334.9/km^{2}). There were 1,288 housing units at an average density of 412.8 per square mile (159.4/km^{2}). The racial makeup of the city was 95.0% White, 1.4% African American, 0.6% Native American, 0.5% Asian, 0.1% Pacific Islander, 0.5% from other races, and 2.0% from two or more races. Hispanic or Latino of any race were 2.7% of the population.

There were 1,153 households, of which 29.3% had children under the age of 18 living with them, 41.4% were married couples living together, 13.1% had a female householder with no husband present, 4.3% had a male householder with no wife present, and 41.2% were non-families. 35.8% of all households were made up of individuals, and 15.3% had someone living alone who was 65 years of age or older. The average household size was 2.22 and the average family size was 2.89.

The median age in the city was 42.9 years. 22.7% of residents were under the age of 18; 6.9% were between the ages of 18 and 24; 22.9% were from 25 to 44; 26.6% were from 45 to 64; and 20.8% were 65 years of age or older. The gender makeup of the city was 45.8% male and 54.2% female.

=== 2000 census ===
As of the census of 2000, there were 2,884 people, 1,165 households, and 739 families living in the city. The population density was 960.0 inhabitants per square mile (370.7/km^{2}). There were 1,262 housing units at an average density of 420.1 per square mile (162.2/km^{2}). The racial makeup of the city was 96.60% White, 0.76% African American, 1.14% Native American, 0.31% Asian, 0.69% from other races, and 0.49% from two or more races. Hispanic or Latino of any race were 2.08% of the population.

There were 1,165 households, out of which 31.5% had children under the age of 18 living with them, 46.4% were married couples living together, 12.5% had a female householder with no husband present, and 36.5% were non-families. 32.2% of all households were made up of individuals, and 16.1% had someone living alone who was 65 years of age or older. The average household size was 2.35 and the average family size was 2.97.

In the city, the population was spread out, with 24.7% under the age of 18, 8.1% from 18 to 24, 25.9% from 25 to 44, 21.8% from 45 to 64, and 19.6% who were 65 years of age or older. The median age was 40 years. For every 100 females, there were 85.1 males. For every 100 females age 18 and over, there were 81.2 males.

The median income for a household in the city was $37,641, and the median income for a family was $50,944. Males had a median income of $41,964 versus $18,615 for females. The per capita income for the city was $18,544. About 5.5% of families and 7.3% of the population were below the poverty line, including 9.2% of those under age 18 and 8.8% of those age 65 or over.

== Culture and recreation ==
=== Music and Fine Arts ===
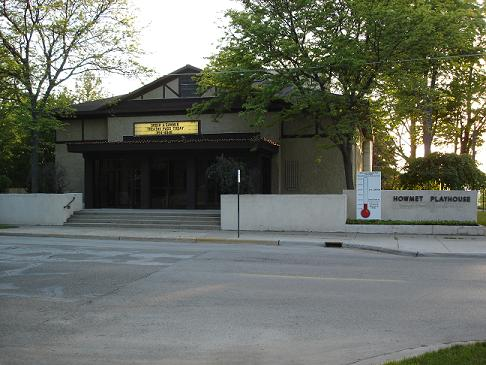
Howmet Playhouse

Whitehall is home to the Playhouse at White Lake. The 400-seat theater was built in 1916 to be a performance venue for the White Lake area. In 1973 the theater was in danger of demolition and was acquired and renovated by nearby Blue Lake Fine Arts Camp with the help of a local fund drive and the participation of Whitehall's largest employer at the time, Howmet Castings. Blue Lake put out productions until building an on-site facility in 2006. The Playhouse was then transferred to the city, which puts on a season of theater running through the summer. Community fund raising efforts to improve the playhouse and keep it running are ongoing.

The Arts Council of White Lake was founded in 1985 and provides arts programming and education to the community. ACWL sponsors a local Summer Concert Series and Artisan Market the first Saturday of the summer months.

Whitehall is also home to three Frank Lloyd Wright cottages and a house, built from 1897 to 1905.

The White River Lighthouse was built in 1875 by Captain William Robinson and served the White Lake area until 1960, when it was deactivated by the U.S. Coast Guard. The brick lighthouse is now a museum and features exhibits about the area's history related to the shipping and logging industries. On May 17, 1953, Mrs. Frances Johnson, the then-keeper of the lighthouse, was a contestant on the long-running TV panel show What's My Line?.

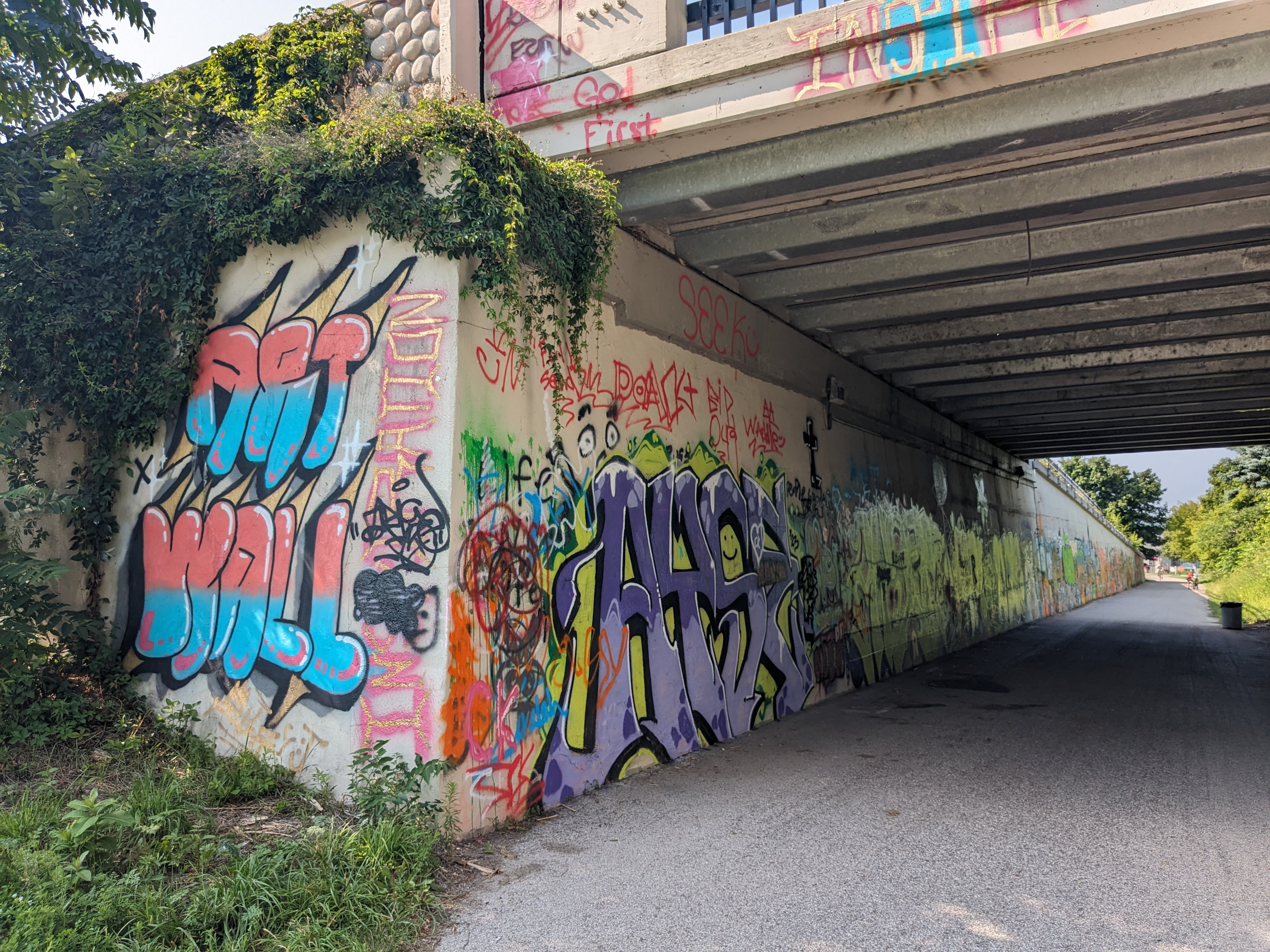
Previously approved Inspiration Art Wall on the White Lake Pathway

In July 2023, the idea of a public inspirational graffiti art wall was approved by the city council. It was located on the White Lake Pathway bike trail under the Colby Street overpass in downtown Whitehall. Less than a year later, on March 12, 2024, the city council announced that the art wall would no longer be open for artistic expression and would be painted over later that day.

=== Recreation ===
The main bike trail that runs through Whitehall, Michigan, is the Hart-Montague Bicycle Trail, which extends into the town from Montague. This is a 22-mile long paved trail, considered Michigan's first linear state park

Nearby in Twin Lake, MI is also the Owasippe Scout Reservation which is open for public hiking and mountain biking during the off-season while Scout summer camp is not in session. The camp occupies 4,800 acres of the Manistee National Forest and lies right at the Eastern edge of Whitehall.

=== Festivals ===
- Memorial Day Parade from downtown Montague and downtown Whitehall, meeting in the middle at Covell Park for a ceremony, near the White Lake Bridge causeway. - Last Monday in May.
- White Lake Area Arts & Crafts Festival in Goodrich Park features more than 150 talented and creative artists, live entertainment, jump houses, and food. - 3rd Saturday of June.
- Fourth of July Parade from downtown Whitehall to downtown Montague.
- Cruz'in: A parade and display of over 400 classic cars. Starts at Funnell Field in Whitehall and parades to downtown Montague. - Last Friday in July.
- Taste of White Lake: Area business and food trucks come together at the Playhouse for an evening.
- FetchFest: Beer tent and food vendors come together in local brewery, Fetch Brewing Company, back parking lot.
- White Lake Chamber Music Festival: Features over 30 events during the 1st week of August.
- Christmas Parade from downtown Whitehall to downtown Montague - First Saturday of December.

== Economy ==
=== Major employers ===
- Howmet (Whitehall, Michigan, formerly Alcoa) – aerospace components manufacturing
- Michigan's Adventure – amusement park (Michigan's largest amusement park and water park)

== Media ==
=== Radio ===
Whitehall is home to several radio stations.

Call sign	Frequency	Format
WGVS	95.3	Public radio
WLAW-FM	97.5	Country
WAXT	98.9	Oldies
WLAW-AM	1490 AM	Country

== Notable people ==
- Nate McLouth, former professional baseball player and Gold Glove winner
- Adella M. Parker, suffragist, politician, lawyer, and educator
- Ruth Thompson, first female state representative of Michigan, first female U.S. representative from Michigan, first female on the U.S. House Judiciary Committee
- Ryan Van Bergen, played defensive end for the University of Michigan, 2008-2011
