= Michigan's 97th House of Representatives district =

American legislative district

Michigan's 97th State House of Representatives district
Representative
Matthew Bierlein; R–Vassar
- Demographics: 88.7% White; 3.2% Black; 4.4% Hispanic; 0.3% Asian; 0.2% Native American; 0.1% Other; 3.2% Multiracial
- Population (2024): 94,207

Michigan's 97th House of Representatives district (also referred to as Michigan's 97th House district) is a legislative district within the Michigan House of Representatives located in parts of Bay, Genesee, Saginaw, and Tuscola counties. The district was created in 1965, when the Michigan House of Representatives district naming scheme changed from a county-based system to a numerical one.

== List of representatives ==
Representative	Party	Dates	Residence	Notes
F. Charles Raap	Democratic	1965–1966	Ravenna	
Edgar A. Geerlings	Republican	1967–1986	Muskegon	
Debbie Farhat	Democratic	1987–1988	Muskegon	
Nancy L. Crandall	Republican	1989–1990	Norton Shores	
Paul Baade	Democratic	1991–1992	Roosevelt Park	
Howard Wetters	Democratic	1993–1998	Kawkawlin	
Joseph Rivet	Democratic	1999–2002	Bay City	
Jennifer Elkins	Democratic	2003–2004	Lake	
Tim Moore	Republican	2005–2010	Farwell	Resigned.
Joel Johnson	Republican	2011–2016	Clare	
Jason Wentworth	Republican	2017–2022	Clare	
Matthew Bierlein	Republican	2023–present	Vassar	
Briar Bearss	Republican	(Note: Member-elect.)	Millington	

== Recent elections ==
=== 2020s ===
2026 Michigan House of Representatives election
Party	Candidate	Votes	%
Republican	Briar Bearss	27,029	62.85
Democratic	Jack Bader	15,977	37.15
Total votes		43,006	100
Republican hold			

2024 Michigan House of Representatives election
Party	Candidate	Votes	%
Republican	Matthew Bierlein	36,497	70.4
Democratic	Mark Putnam	15,378	29.6
Total votes		51,875	100
Republican hold			

2022 Michigan House of Representatives election
Party	Candidate	Votes	%
Republican	Matthew Bierlein	28,024	66.6
Democratic	Paul Whitney	14,028	33.4
Total votes		42,052	100
Republican hold			

2020 Michigan House of Representatives election
Party	Candidate	Votes	%
Republican	Jason Wentworth	31,602	71.2
Democratic	Celia Young-Wenkel	12,794	28.8
Total votes		44,396	100
Republican hold			

2018 Michigan House of Representatives election
Party	Candidate	Votes	%
Republican	Jason Wentworth	22,476	67.9
Democratic	Celia Young-Wenkel	10,652	32.2
Total votes		33,128	100
Republican hold			

2016 Michigan House of Representatives election
Party	Candidate	Votes	%
Republican	Jason Wentworth	24,124	64.9
Democratic	Bob Townsend	13,074	35.2
Total votes		37,198	100
Republican hold			

2014 Michigan House of Representatives election
Party	Candidate	Votes	%
Republican	Joel Johnson	16,570	63.1
Democratic	Mark Lightfoot	9,688	36.9
Total votes		26,258	100
Republican hold			

2012 Michigan House of Representatives election
Party	Candidate	Votes	%
Republican	Joel Johnson	23,295	61.8
Democratic	Chris Breznau	14,387	38.2
Total votes		37,682	100
Republican hold			

2010 Michigan House of Representatives election
Party	Candidate	Votes	%
Republican	Joel Johnson	16,819	58.3
Democratic	Mark Lightfoot	10,657	36.9
Libertarian	Brandon Dickhausen	1,392	4.8
Total votes		28,868	100
Republican hold			

2008 Michigan House of Representatives election
Party	Candidate	Votes	%
Republican	Tim Moore	25,996	60.6
Democratic	Kathy Wilton	16,877	39.4
Total votes		42,873	100
Republican hold			

== Historical district boundaries ==
Map	Description	Apportionment Plan	Notes
	Muskegon County (part): Casnovia Township; Cedar Creek Township; Dalton Township; Egelston Township; Fruitland Township; Fruitport Township; Holton Township; Laketon Township; Moorland Township; Muskegon Township (part); North Muskegon; Norton Township; Ravenna Township; Roosevelt Park; Sullivan Township	1964 Apportionment Plan	
	Muskegon County (part): Excluding; Fruitland Township; Fruitport Township (part); Laketon Township; Montague; Montague Township; Muskegon; Muskegon Heights; Muskegon Township; North Muskegon; White River Township; Ottawa County (part): Excluding; Holland (part); Hudsonville; Georgetown Township (part); Jamestown Township; Zeeland Township	1972 Apportionment Plan	
	Muskegon County (part): Blue Lake Township; Casnovia Township; Cedar Creek Township; Dalton Township; Egelston Township; Fruitport Township; Holton Township; Moorland Township; Muskegon Heights; Norton Shores; Ravenna Township; Roosevelt Park; Sullivan Township	1982 Apportionment Plan	
	Bay County (part): Auburn; Bangor Township; Beaver Township; Fraser Township; Garfield Township; Gibson Township; Kawkawlin Township; Midland; Mount Forest Township; Pinconning; Pinconning Township; Williams Township	1992 Apportionment Plan	
	Arenac County; Bay County (part); Fraser Township; Garfield Township; Gibson Township; Kawkawlin Township; Mount Forest Township; Pinconning; Pinconning Township; Clare County; Gladwin County	2001 Apportionment Plan	
	Arenac County; Clare County; Gladwin County; Osceola County (part); Evart; Evart Township; Hersey Township; Highland Township; Marion Township; Middle Branch Township; Orient Township; Osceola Township; Sherman Township; Sylvan Township	2011 Apportionment Plan	
