= Murder of Jessica Heeringa =

2013 disappearance and murder case in Michigan, U.S.

Jessica Heeringa
- 2013 photo of Jessica Heeringa
- Born: Jessica Lynn Heeringa; July 16, 1987
- Disappeared: April 26, 2013 (aged 25)
- Died: c. April 26, 2013 (aged 25); Norton Shores, Michigan, U.S.
- Occupation: Gas station clerk
- Employer: Exxon (franchise)
- Height: 5 ft 1 in (155 cm)
- Spouse: None
- Children: 1
- Parents: Pete Jenkins; Shelly Heeringa
- Website: FindJessicaHeeringa (Facebook)

Jessica Lynn Heeringa (July 16, 1987 – c. April 26, 2013) was a 25-year-old woman from Norton Shores, Michigan, who disappeared from the Exxon gas station where she was working on the night of April 26, 2013.

Left at the scene of the apparent abduction, investigators found Heeringa's car and jacket, as well as her cigarettes and purse with a large amount of money. They also located drops of blood outside the gas station, which subsequent DNA analysis positively matched to Heeringa. Also, parts to a firearm were uncovered in proximity to the blood.

Over the next three and a half years, a 75-member task force with 14 specialized divisions—such as aviation, behavioral sciences, technical services, and intelligence analysis — from 15 local, state, and federal law enforcement agencies — gave 12,000 man-hours to a vast investigation that included upwards of 1,400 tips received, 33 search warrants executed, 20 residential searches by consent, as well as 12 ground and two underwater searches.

Although Heeringa's remains have never been found, a pair of male cousins have been tried and convicted in connection with her untimely disappearance and assumed murder. In September 2016, a resident of Muskegon Township, Michigan named Jeffrey Willis was charged with her kidnapping and murder on the strength of forensic evidence combined with eyewitness testimony that implicated him. Willis was found guilty of Heeringa's kidnapping and murder on May 16, 2018; he was sentenced to life in prison a month later.

On November 2, 2017, Willis was also found guilty of the 2014 murder of Rebekah Sue Bletsch; six weeks later, he received the mandatory sentence of life imprisonment without the possibility of parole. Willis was also charged (but not tried) with the attempted kidnapping of a 16-year-old girl in 2016, as well as child pornography in 2011, which involved his unsuspecting female next-door neighbors who were 14 years old at the time. He is also a suspect in the unsolved murder of a 15-year-old girl that occurred in 1996.

Willis's cousin, Kevin Bluhm, pleaded guilty to lying to detectives both during the Heeringa investigation as well as during that of a 2014 homicide (of which Willis was convicted); for this offense, he was sentenced to time served. On November 27, 2017, Bluhm pleaded no contest to having been an accessory after the fact by helping Willis dispose of Heeringa's body; for this, he was sentenced on January 9, 2018, to time served plus five years' probation along with the added requirement of having to wear a GPS tether for one year at minimum.

== Disappearance ==
Locations
1 Exxon gas station, 1196 E Sternberg Rd, Norton Shores, MI 49444, United States.

=== Timeline ===
Composite sketch of the suspect

The following is based on eyewitness and police testimony made in court hearings.

==== April 25, 2013 ====
- A female customer who frequented the gas station saw Heeringa working late at night and commented to her that she should not be there all alone at such a late hour and that her boyfriend should at least accompany her. She reported that a man who overheard the women's conversation then interjected, "She's got her customers looking out for her too" but that Heeringa "sort of shook her head and started shivering ... like a chill went up her spine or something." Furthermore, the customer claimed that Heeringa "wasn't her usual happy self" and that it appeared "something was wrong," so she parked outside the station until it closed. She did observe the strange man leave that night.

==== April 26, 2013 ====
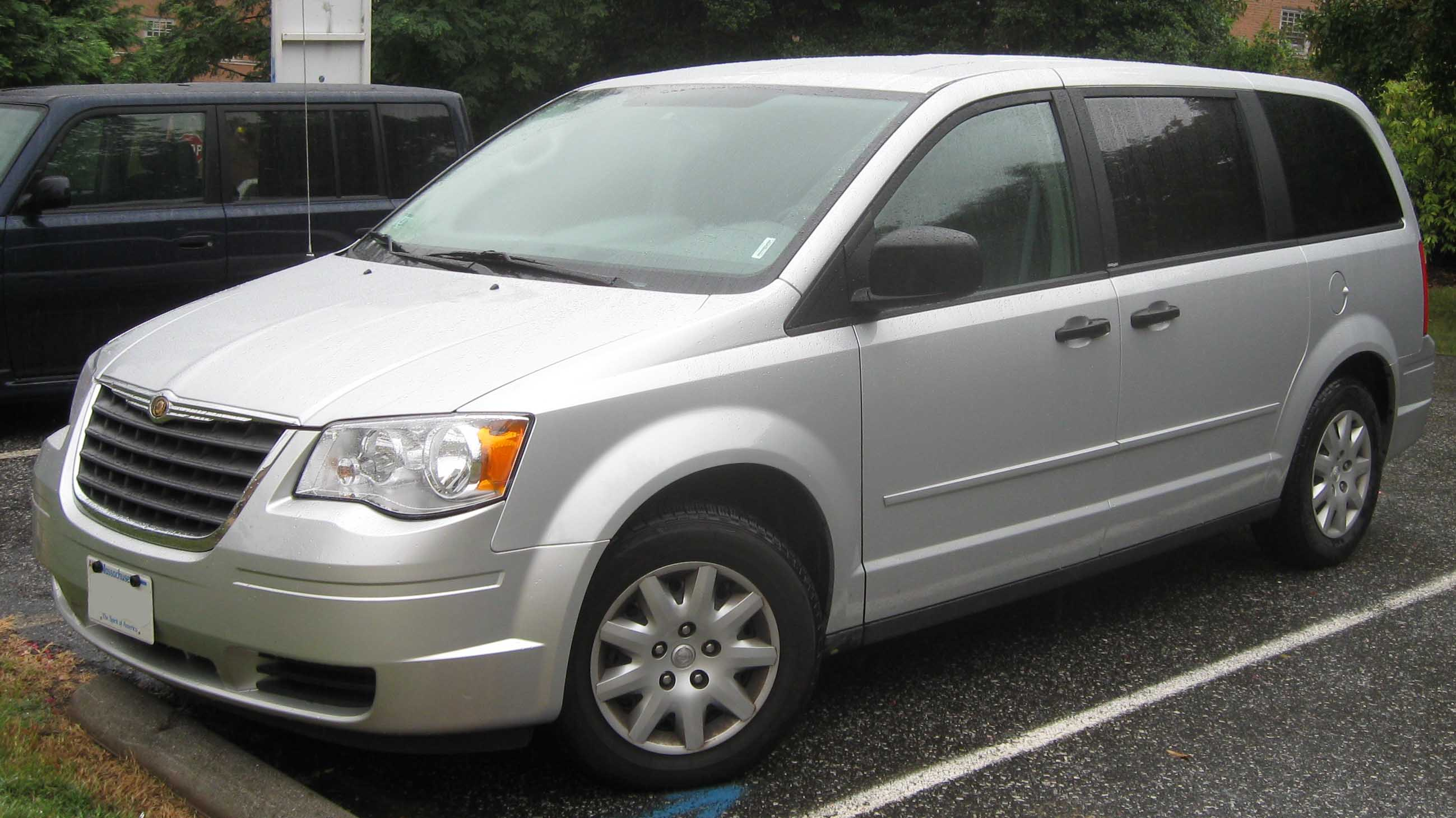
2008 Chrysler Town & Country LX

- 10:55 pm: The last transaction, a cigarette lighter, was recorded on Heeringa's register.
- 11:00 pm: An Exxon manager and her husband drove by the station only to find a man acting in a suspicious manner; they observed him repeatedly opening and closing his silver minivan's rear hatch. Then they saw him drive away. They later described the man, his behavior, and his vehicle to the police.
- 11:02–11:05 pm: A silver Chrysler Town & Country matching the manager's description was caught by surveillance cameras of three other businesses speeding away from the station.
- 11:10 pm: A man pulled up to the station and attempted to pay for gas; however, being unable to find Heeringa anywhere in the store, he called 911.
- 11:25 pm: Police arrived at the gas station. In addition to Heeringa's belongings, they found accessory parts to a gun near a pool of blood outside the station. They ruled out robbery as soon as they discovered that over $400 cash was left in Heeringa's wallet and that no money was missing from the station's register. About an hour later, a police K-9 searched the immediate area but did not find anything.

== Charges ==
=== Jeffrey Willis ===
Jeffrey Thomas Willis
- 2016 mugshot of Jeffrey Willis
- Born: March 6, 1970 (age 56)
- Height: 68 in (1.73 m)
- Convictions: First-degree murder (two counts); Kidnapping; Use of a firearm in the commission of a felony
- Penalty: Life imprisonment without the possibility of parole

Details
- Victims: 2 (convicted) 3 (suspected)
- Span of crimes: 2013–2014
- Country: United States
- State: Michigan
- Date apprehended: April 16, 2016

On September 20, 2016, Jeffrey Thomas Willis, a former factory worker previously incarcerated at the Muskegon County Jail for other crimes including homicide, was charged by the Muskegon County Prosecutor's Office with the kidnapping and murder of Heeringa. Willis had been a frequent customer at her place of employment, he matched a police artist's sketch of a man seen "being real flirty" with her on the night of her disappearance, and his minivan matched the description of one witnessed at the crime scene and recorded on security cameras speeding away from her workplace at about the time she went missing. His co-workers told police that he was scheduled to work that night but that he never arrived, nor did he show up for work in the days afterwards. Police executed a search warrant for Willis's home and found pictures of Heeringa in a folder labeled "vics" on his computer. Police searched for her body near his home after a tip was called in on June 17, 2016, but found nothing. Police had previously searched for her body in and around a cabin in Mancelona owned by a friend of Willis's on May 20, 2016, but also came up empty. Soon after Heeringa's disappearance, a local resident saw Willis at the Mancelona property walking out of the woods with a shovel.

==== Jessica Heeringa trial ====
On December 13, 2016, a Muskegon County judge ruled that Willis would stand trial for murder and kidnapping charges in Heeringa's case. After four days of testimony during the preliminary hearing, Judge Raymond Kostrzewa ruled that there was sufficient basis to proceed with a trial, noting evidence such as the folder on Willis's computer titled "vics" (possibly short for victims), which prosecutors say included a sub-folder titled with her initials, photos of Heeringa, and the date of her disappearance. They also found necrophilia and murder porn videos downloaded from the internet—some of which were simulated and some of which were real.

The trial for Heeringa's murder took place in May 2018. After 1½ hours of deliberations, the jury found Willis guilty of Heeringa's kidnapping and murder on May 16, 2018. A month later, he received a sentence of life without parole.

==== Rebekah Bletsch murder ====
On May 25, 2016, Willis was charged with the murder of Rebekah Sue Bletsch, a 36-year-old jogger whose body was found with three gunshots to the head near her home in Dalton Township on June 29, 2014. Shell casings found near her body matched a gun found in Willis's minivan, where police also found disturbing photos of women bound and gagged, handcuffs, chains, ropes, and syringes including one with a liquid later identified as a powerful sedative. Another sub-folder found inside the "vics" folder on Willis's computer had pictures of Bletsch. Judge Kostrzewa denied bond for Willis and ordered him to remain in the Muskegon County Jail. Jury selection for the Bletsch murder trial began on October 17, 2017. On November 2, 2017, a remorseless Jeffrey Willis was found guilty of first-degree murder in the death of Bletsch and of the use of a firearm in the commission of a felony. He was sentenced to life without parole six weeks later.

==== Rebekah Bletsch Law ====
On March 9, 2018, the Michigan House of Representatives passed a bill that will require convicted defendants to listen to victims' impact statements at sentencing, which was inspired by Willis's refusal to do so after the Bletsch trial. It was passed by the Michigan Senate on May 10, 2018. Michigan Governor Rick Snyder signed it into law on May 24, 2018. It is officially known as the "Rebekah Bletsch Law."

==== Other charges ====
Willis is also charged with the attempted kidnapping of a (not publicly identified) 16-year-old girl in Laketon Township on April 16, 2016. She became lost after leaving a party, and Willis approached her in his van with an offer to let her use his phone. He insisted that she get in the car to use the phone. Once inside the car, he locked all of the doors and produced a gun, but she managed to escape with minor injuries after she said she couldn't breathe and convinced him to open her window.

Willis was charged with production and possession of child pornography after police found videos of two nude girls who were 14 at the time on his computer. He lived next door to the girls in March 2011 in Fruitland Township and recorded them without their knowledge while they used his bathroom.

==== Other suspected crime ====
Willis is a suspect in the unsolved murder of 15-year-old Fruitport High School student Angela Marie Thornburg, whose partially-clothed body was found by a hunter on October 17, 1996, in the woods near I-96 in Fruitport. She went missing a month earlier and was initially considered a runaway, with sightings of her reported soon after. Reports from the time said she ran out a back door at her boyfriend's house when her mother came to pick her up. Willis graduated from the same high school in 1988 and worked as a janitor for the school district from 1998 to 1999 before being fired for looking at pornography on a computer meant for students in an elementary school.

=== Kevin Bluhm ===
Kevin Lavern Bluhm
- 2016 mugshot of Kevin Bluhm
- Born: October 18, 1968 (age 57)
- Height: 75 in (1.91 m)
- Convictions: Lying to a police officer during a violent crime investigation (two counts); Accessory after the fact
- Penalty: Five years' probation Required to a wear a GPS tether Time served

Details
- Span of crimes: 2013–2014
- Country: United States
- State: Michigan
- Date apprehended: June 21, 2016

On June 21, 2016, Willis's cousin Kevin Lavern Bluhm, a former Michigan Department of Corrections prison guard, was charged with lying to a police officer during a violent crime investigation after he told police information about Heeringa's disappearance that was not made public but which he later recanted. He was charged with the same crime in connection with the Bletsch case. Bluhm pleaded guilty to both counts on August 26, 2016, and was later sentenced to time served.

Bluhm was also charged with being an accessory after the fact when he admitted to investigators he saw Willis with Heeringa's body and helped him bury her after she was sexually assaulted. Bluhm said Willis called him the day after Heeringa's disappearance and said he had a woman and there was a party. Bluhm told police he saw Heeringa with an obvious head wound, face down, hands out, and tied. She was naked and wasn't moving. He also told police he knew that "Jeff had been following or watching Ms. Heeringa, and that he hit her ... which made her go unconscious to get her in the van," and that Willis had raped her, used sexual toys and torture. He told investigators he and Willis wrapped Heeringa up in a sheet and drove her to an area on Sheridan Road near Laketon Road, where Willis had already dug a hole and placed shovels. Together they buried her corpse. Bluhm was suspended without pay from his job as a sergeant at the West Shoreline Correctional Facility, a state prison in Muskegon Heights. On November 27, 2017, Bluhm pleaded no contest to being an accessory after the fact for helping Willis dispose of Heeringa's body and was sentenced on January 9, 2018, to time served, plus five years probation and to wear a GPS tether for at least a year.

== Jessica's Law ==
On December 9, 2013, a Michigan House of Representatives Bill was announced titled the Jessica Heeringa act, or alternatively Jessica's Law (officially known as House Bill 4123). It was requested by Heeringa's parents, introduced by Representative Collene Lamonte and community member Sharron Pennell and sponsored by Marcia Hovey-Wright and several other Michigan legislature members. The bill requires gas stations and convenience stores that are open between the hours of 11pm and 5am to install and maintain a security camera system or to have at least two employees on shift during these hours. The bill would establish a civil fine of not more than $200 for each violation. Businesses excluded from Jessica's Law include hotels, taverns, restaurants, pharmacies, grocery stores, supermarkets or businesses that have more than 10,000 square feet of retail space.

As of March 11, 2020, the bill has not been passed by the Michigan legislature. Small business owners are concerned about the cost associated with installing surveillance cameras or the hiring of additional staff. In November 2014, Shelley Heeringa, Jessica's mother, traveled to the Michigan State Capitol in Lansing to speak with state lawmakers concerning Jessica's law. "If you have a daughter, a sister, thank God that they're still with you," Shelly Heeringa said. The owner of the gas station Jessica Heeringa worked at, which did not have a surveillance camera system at the time of her disappearance, has since had one installed.

== In popular culture ==
The television series Unsolved Mysteries released their Jessica Heeringa story on the second anniversary of her disappearance in April 2015. The story was released via a webisode titled "The abduction of Jessica Heeringa," which was narrated by her mother, who also mentioned there was a $26,000 reward for information about her disappearance.

The case was featured on the season seven premiere of the Investigation Discovery series Disappeared, titled "Somebody's Watching," originally aired on April 11, 2016. Coincidentally, Willis's arrest for the attempted kidnapping of the minor female less than a week later on April 16, and the additional investigation afterwards, eventually led to the other charges against him and Bluhm.

Jessica's story was subject of a three-part episode of the podcast The Vanished in April to September 2016. The episodes review the disappearance, investigation, evidence and eventual charges against the suspects in her disappearance.

The case was also profiled on an episode of Crime Watch Daily, originally aired on January 10, 2017.

The case was profiled on an episode of Jensen and Holes: The Murder Squad podcast dated April 15, 2019.

The case was profiled on an episode of Crime Junkie Podcast dated February 24, 2020.

The case was the subject of an episode of the Irish YouTube series That Chapter.

The 2016 kidnapping victim described her experience escaping from Willis on a 2022 episode of A&E Network's I Survived a Serial Killer.

The ABC News program 20/20 profiled all three Jeffrey Willis cases on an episode entitled "The Murderer In the Minivan" which debuted on February 2, 2024.

== See also ==
- List of homicides in Michigan
- List of murder convictions without a body
- List of solved missing person cases (post-2000)
