= Michigan's 34th Senate district =

American legislative district

Michigan's 34th State Senate district
Senator
Roger Hauck; R–Mount Pleasant
- Demographics: 88% White; 2.3% Black; 4% Hispanic; 0.7% Asian; 0.9% Native American; 0.3% Other; 3.8% Multiracial
- Population (2024): 271,004

Michigan's 34th Senate district is one of 38 districts in the Michigan Senate. The 34th district was created in 1953 due to the adoption of a state constitutional amendment via ballot initiative in November 1952. The 1908 state constitution initially only allowed for 32 senate districts. It has been represented by Republican Jon Bumstead since 2019, succeeding fellow Republican Goeff Hansen.

== Geography ==
District 34 encompasses all of Clare, Gladwin, Gratiot, Isabella, Mecosta, and Osceola counties, as well as parts of Bay, Clinton, Lake, Midland, and Saginaw counties.

=== 2011 Apportionment Plan ===
District 34, as dictated by the 2011 Apportionment Plan, was based in Muskegon, covered all of Muskegon County as well as nearby Newaygo and Oceana Counties. Other communities in the district included Norton Shores, Muskegon Heights, North Muskegon, Roosevelt Park, Whitehall, Wolf Lake, Hart, Fremont, Muskegon Township, and Fruitport Township.

The district was located entirely within Michigan's 2nd congressional district, and overlapped with the 91st, 92nd, and 100th districts of the Michigan House of Representatives. Much of the district lied along Lake Michigan.

== List of senators ==
Senator	Party	Dates	Residence	Notes
Frank D. Beadle	Republican	1955–1964	St. Clair	
Jerome T. Hart	Democratic	1965–1982	Saginaw	
James Barcia	Democratic	1983–1993	Bay City	Resigned.
Joel Gougeon	Republican	1993–2002	Bay City	
Gerald Van Woerkom	Republican	2003–2010	Muskegon	
Goeff Hansen	Republican	2011–2018	Hart	
Jon Bumstead	Republican	2019–2022	Newaygo	
Roger Hauck	Republican	2023–present	Mount Pleasant	

== Recent election results ==
=== 2020s ===
2026 Michigan Senate election
Primary election
Party	Candidate	Votes	%
General election
Republican	Roger Hauck (incumbent)	74,114	64.35
Democratic	Tyler Landgraf	42,693	36.55
Total votes		116,807	100
Republican hold			

2022 Michigan Senate election, District 34
Primary election
Party	Candidate	Votes	%
Republican	Roger Hauck	27,721	76.9
Republican	Lisa M. Sowers	8,335	23.1
Total votes		36,056	100
Democratic	Christine Gerace	13,323	100
Total votes		13,323	100
General election
Republican	Roger Hauck	71,202	64.4
Democratic	Christine Gerace	36,757	33.2
Constitution	Becky McDonald	2,682	2.4
Total votes		110,641	100
Republican hold			

=== 2018 ===
2018 Michigan Senate election, District 34
Primary election
Party	Candidate	Votes	%
Republican	Jon Bumstead	13,379	51.7
Republican	Holly Hughes	12,494	48.3
Total votes		25,873	100
Democratic	Poppy Sias-Hernandez	11,803	53.9
Democratic	Collene Lamonte	10,084	46.1
Total votes		21,887	100
General election
Republican	Jon Bumstead	50,313	50.7
Democratic	Poppy Sias-Hernandez	45,941	46.3
Libertarian	Max Riekse	2,896	2.9
Total votes		99,150	100
Republican hold			

=== 2014 ===
2014 Michigan Senate election, District 34
Primary election
Party	Candidate	Votes	%
Republican	Goeff Hansen (incumbent)	9,203	62.4
Republican	Nick Sundquist	5,538	37.6
Total votes		14,741	100
General election
Republican	Goeff Hansen (incumbent)	39,129	55.6
Democratic	Cathy Forbes	31,246	44.4
Total votes		70,375	100
Republican hold			

=== Federal and statewide results ===
Year	Office	Results
2020	President	Trump 54.5 – 43.7%
2018	Senate	James 50.1 – 47.1%
2018	Governor	Schuette 46.2 – 46.0%
2016	President	Trump 52.0 – 42.2%
2014	Senate	Peters 52.1 – 42.5%
2014	Governor	Snyder 51.3 – 45.7%
2012	President	Obama 53.5 – 45.5%
2012	Senate	Stabenow 56.1 – 40.6%

== Historical district boundaries ==
Map	Description	Apportionment Plan	Notes
	Bay County (part); Bangor Township; Bay City; Essexville; Frankenlust Township; Hampton Township; Monitor Township; Portsmouth Township; Saginaw County (part); Buena Vista Township; Carrollton Township; Kochville Township; Saginaw; Zilwaukee; Zilwaukee Township	1964 Apportionment Plan	
	Bay County (part); Excluding; Midland; Saginaw County (part); Buena Vista Township; Carrollton Township; Kochville Township; Saginaw (part); Zilwaukee; Zilwaukee Township	1972 Apportionment Plan	
	Arenac County; Bay County; Gladwin County; Huron County; Tuscola County	1982 Apportionment Plan	
	Arenac County; Bay County; Huron County; Ogemaw County; Tuscola County	1992 Apportionment Plan	
	Mason County; Muskegon County; Newaygo County; Oceana County	2001 Apportionment Plan	
	Muskegon County; Newaygo County; Oceana County	2011 Apportionment Plan	
