= Michigan's 91st House of Representatives district =

American legislative district

Michigan's 91st State House of Representatives district
Representative
| Pat Outman; R–Six Lakes |
- Demographics: 88.2% White; 1.6% Black; 4.9% Hispanic; 0.3% Asian; 0.2% Native American; 0.3% Other; 4.5% Multiracial
- Population (2024): 92,353

Michigan's 91st House of Representatives district (also referred to as Michigan's 91st House district) is a legislative district within the Michigan House of Representatives located in parts of Ionia, Kent, and Montcalm counties. The district was created in 1965, when the Michigan House of Representatives district naming scheme changed from a county-based system to a numerical one.

== List of representatives ==
| Representative | Party | Dates | Residence | Notes |
|---|---|---|---|---|
| Thomas G. Ford | Republican | 1965–1972 | Grand Rapids | |
| Peter Kok | Republican | 1973–1978 | Grand Rapids | |
| Paul B. Henry | Republican | 1979–1982 | Grand Rapids | |
| Walter J. DeLange | Republican | 1983–1992 | Kentwood | |
| Paul Baade | Democratic | 1993–1998 | Muskegon | Lived in Roosevelt Park until around 1997. |
| Gerald Van Woerkom | Republican | 1999–2002 | Muskegon | |
| David Farhat | Republican | 2003–2006 | Muskegon | |
| Mary Valentine | Democratic | 2007–2010 | Norton Shores | Lived in Muskegon until around 2009. |
| Holly Hughes | Republican | 2011–2012 | Montague | |
| Collene Lamonte | Democratic | 2013–2014 | Montague | |
| Holly Hughes | Republican | 2015–2018 | Montague | |
| Greg VanWoerkom | Republican | 2019–2022 | Norton Shores | |
| Pat Outman | Republican | 2023–present | Six Lakes | |

== Recent elections ==
=== 2020s ===
2026 Michigan House of Representatives election
| Party | Candidate | Votes | % |
|---|---|---|---|
| Republican | Pat Outman (incumbent) | 27,438 | 66.15 |
| Democratic | Frank Lafata | 14,043 | 33.85 |
| Total votes | | 41,481 | 100 |
| Republican hold | | | |

2024 Michigan House of Representatives election
| Party | Candidate | Votes | % |
|---|---|---|---|
| Republican | Pat Outman | 36,463 | 71.4 |
| Democratic | Jason Dillingham | 14,570 | 28.6 |
| Total votes | | 51,033 | 100 |
| Republican hold | | | |

2022 Michigan House of Representatives election
| Party | Candidate | Votes | % |
|---|---|---|---|
| Republican | Pat Outman | 26,680 | 68.3 |
| Democratic | Tammy DeVries | 12,380 | 31.7 |
| Total votes | | 39,061 | 100 |
| Republican hold | | | |

2020 Michigan House of Representatives election
| Party | Candidate | Votes | % |
|---|---|---|---|
| Republican | Greg VanWoerkom | 29,968 | 60.1 |
| Democratic | Brian Hosticka | 19,901 | 39.9 |
| Total votes | | 49,869 | 100 |
| Republican hold | | | |

2018 Michigan House of Representatives election
| Party | Candidate | Votes | % |
|---|---|---|---|
| Republican | Greg VanWoerkom | 20,914 | 55.7 |
| Democratic | Tanya Cabala | 16,616 | 44.3 |
| Total votes | | 37,530 | 100 |
| Republican hold | | | |

2016 Michigan House of Representatives election
| Party | Candidate | Votes | % |
|---|---|---|---|
| Republican | Holly Hughes | 20,959 | 49.3 |
| Democratic | Collene Lamonte | 18,558 | 43.7 |
| Libertarian | Max Riekse | 2,965 | 7.0 |
| Total votes | | 42,482 | 100 |
| Republican hold | | | |

2014 Michigan House of Representatives election
| Party | Candidate | Votes | % |
|---|---|---|---|
| Republican | Holly Hughes | 12,737 | 46.5 |
| Democratic | Collene Lamonte | 12,679 | 46.3 |
| Independent | Alan Jager | 1,958 | 7.2 |
| Total votes | | 27,374 | 100 |
| Republican gain from Democratic | | | |

2012 Michigan House of Representatives election
| Party | Candidate | Votes | % |
|---|---|---|---|
| Democratic | Collene Lamonte | 19,257 | 48.1 |
| Republican | Holly Hughes | 18,924 | 47.3 |
| Libertarian | Nicholas Sundquist | 1,856 | 4.6 |
| Total votes | | 40,037 | 100 |
| Democratic gain from Republican | | | |

2010 Michigan House of Representatives election
| Party | Candidate | Votes | % |
|---|---|---|---|
| Republican | Holly Hughes | 16,033 | 55.9 |
| Democratic | Ben Gillette | 12,628 | 44.1 |
| Total votes | | 28,661 | 100 |
| Republican gain from Democratic | | | |

2008 Michigan House of Representatives election
| Party | Candidate | Votes | % |
|---|---|---|---|
| Democratic | Mary Valentine | 24,444 | 53.8 |
| Republican | Holly Hughes | 21,034 | 46.3 |
| Total votes | | 45,478 | 100 |
| Democratic hold | | | |

== Historical district boundaries ==
| Map | Description | Apportionment Plan | Notes |
|---|---|---|---|
| | Kent County (part): Byron Township; Caledonia Township; East Grand Rapids; Gaines Township; Grand Rapids (part); Grand Rapids Township; Paris Township; Wyoming (part) | 1964 Apportionment Plan | |
| | Kent County (part): East Grand Rapids; Grand Rapids (part); Grand Rapids Township; Kentwood (part) | 1972 Apportionment Plan | |
| | Kent County (part): Bowne Township; Byron Township; Caledonia Township; Cascade Township; East Grand Rapids; Gaines Township; Grand Rapids Township; Kentwood | 1982 Apportionment Plan | |
| | Muskegon County (part): Blue Lake Township; Casnovia Township; Cedar Creek Township; Dalton Township; Egelston Township; Fruitland Township; Fruitport Township; Holton Township; Montague; Montague Township; Moorland Township; Norton Shores; Ravenna Township; Roosevelt Park; Sullivan Township; Whitehall; Whitehall Township; White River Township | 1992 Apportionment Plan | |
| | Muskegon County (part): Blue Lake Township; Casnovia Township; Cedar Creek Township; Dalton Township; Egelston Township; Fruitport Township; Holton Township; Montague; Montague Township; Moorland Township; Norton Shores; Ravenna Township; Roosevelt Park; Sullivan Township; Whitehall; Whitehall Township; Ottawa County (part): Chester Township | 2001 Apportionment Plan | |
| | Muskegon County (part): Blue Lake Township; Casnovia Township; Cedar Creek Township; Dalton Township; Egelston Township; Fruitport Township; Holton Township; Montague; Montague Township; Moorland Township; Norton Shores; Ravenna Township; Roosevelt Park; Sullivan Township; Whitehall; White River Township | 2011 Apportionment Plan | |
