= Terry Sabo =

American politician

Member of the Michigan House of Representatives from the 92nd district
- In office January 1, 2017 – 2022
- Preceded by: Marcia Hovey-Wright
- Succeeded by: Jerry Neyer

Personal details
- Born: November 8, 1966 (age 59) Ravenna, Michigan, U.S.
- Party: Democratic

Terry J. Sabo (born November 8, 1966) is a former American politician who served as a Democratic member of the Michigan House of Representatives from 2017 to 2022.

Sabo was born November 8, 1966, in Ravenna, Michigan. He served in the United States Air Force from 1986 to 1990, as a firefighter and police officer for Muskegon Heights, Michigan, as a police officer with the North Muskegon, Michigan Police Department, and the Muskegon County Sheriff's Department. He served in various roles for the county government in Muskegon County, Michigan. He was the Road Commissioner from 2011 to 2012 and then on the County Commission for Muskegon County, Michigan from 2013 to 2016 (Chair 2015-16).
