= Mary Valentine =

American politician (born 1946)

Member of the Michigan House of Representatives from the 91st district
- In office January 1, 2007 – January 1, 2011
- Preceded by: David Farhat
- Succeeded by: Holly Hughes

Personal details
- Born: December 30, 1946 (age 79) Flint, Michigan, U.S.
- Party: Democratic
- Spouse: Phil Valentine

Mary Valentine (born December 30, 1946) is a politician from the U.S. state of Michigan. She is a Democrat and former member of the Michigan State House of Representatives. She represented the 91st State House District, which includes most of Muskegon County, except for the city of Muskegon and surrounding areas. It also includes a small portion of Ottawa County. In 2010 she ran for the state senate, but was defeated in a landslide by her Republican opponent.

== Early life ==
Mary Valentine was born in Flint and grew up in Bay City. She received a bachelor's degree from Central Michigan University in speech therapy and a master's degree from Northern Michigan University in education. She spent over thirty years working as a Speech Pathologist in the Muskegon area Public Schools until retiring in 2006 to run for the State House.

== Political career ==
Valentine officially started her campaign for the Michigan House of Representatives in June 2006. She was unopposed in the Democratic Party primary election. In the general election, she faced incumbent Representative David Farhat. Farhat was a two-term incumbent who had faced tough elections in the past. The 91st district is a mostly urban district and is one of the most competitive in the State. Valentine won the election by a margin of 56-44 to gain her first elective office. In the House, she was the vice-chair of the Education Committee. She also served on the Commerce, Great Lakes and Environment, Health Policy, and Retiree Health Care Reforms Committees.

In 2010 she was a candidate for the open 34th State Senate seat, which was being vacated by Republican Gerald Van Woerkom. Because of this, Valentine did not seek a third term in the State House of Representatives. She went on to lose the state senate election in a landslide to Goeff Hansen and her house seat fell to the Republicans as well.

== Personal ==
Valentine lives in Norton Shores with her husband Phil, to whom she has been married for 28 years. She has two children Robin and Shawn Valentine. She is involved with her church and has taught Sunday School for the past 16 years.

Preceded by David Farhat	Michigan State Representative, 91st District; 2007 - 2011	Succeeded by Holly Hughes
