= Michigan's 92nd House of Representatives district =

American legislative district

Michigan's 92nd State House of Representatives district
Representative
Jerry Neyer; R–Shepherd
- Demographics: 81.9% White; 4.3% Black; 6.2% Hispanic; 1.3% Asian; 1.8% Native American; 0.3% Other; 4.2% Multiracial
- Population (2024): 92,306

Michigan's 92nd House of Representatives district (also referred to as Michigan's 92nd House district) is a legislative district within the Michigan House of Representatives located in parts of Gratiot and Isabella counties. The district was created in 1965, when the Michigan House of Representatives district naming scheme changed from a county-based system to a numerical one.

== List of representatives ==
Representative	Party	Dates	Residence	Notes
Stanley J. Davis	Democratic	1965–1972	Grand Rapids	
Richard D. Buth	Republican	1973–1974	Belmont	
Thomas C. Mathieu	Democratic	1975–1992	Grand Rapids	
James G. Agee	Democratic	1993–1998	Muskegon	
Julie Dennis	Democratic	1999–2004	Muskegon	
Doug Bennett	Democratic	2005–2010	Muskegon	
Marcia Hovey-Wright	Democratic	2011–2016	Muskegon	
Terry Sabo	Democratic	2017–2022	Muskegon	
Jerry Neyer	Republican	2023–present	Shepherd	

== Recent elections ==
=== 2020s ===
2026 Michigan House of Representatives election
Party	Candidate	Votes	%
Republican	Jerry Neyer (incumbent)	18,948	54.03
Democratic	Luke Del Castillo	16,121	45.97
Total votes		35,069	100
Republican hold			

2024 Michigan House of Representatives election
Party	Candidate	Votes	%
Republican	Jerry Neyer	24,007	57.5
Democratic	Tim Odykirk	17,733	42.5
Total votes		41,740	100
Republican hold			

2022 Michigan House of Representatives election
Party	Candidate	Votes	%
Republican	Jerry Neyer	18,080	55.5
Democratic	Anthony Feig	13,809	42.4
Libertarian	Greg Black	670	2.1
Total votes		32,559	100
Republican hold			

2020 Michigan House of Representatives election
Party	Candidate	Votes	%
Democratic	Terry Sabo	25,430	65.3
Republican	Michael Haueisen	13,506	34.7
Total votes		38,936	100
Democratic hold			

2018 Michigan House of Representatives election
Party	Candidate	Votes	%
Democratic	Terry Sabo	19,614	68.8
Republican	Gail Eichorst	8,917	31.3
Total votes		28,531	100
Democratic hold			

2016 Michigan House of Representatives election
Party	Candidate	Votes	%
Democratic	Terry Sabo	22,584	68.2
Republican	Marshall Davis	10,528	31.8
Total votes		33,112	100
Democratic hold			

2014 Michigan House of Representatives election
Party	Candidate	Votes	%
Democratic	Marcia Hovey-Wright	13,846	66.9
Republican	Ken Berman	6,841	33.1
Total votes		20,687	100
Democratic hold			

2012 Michigan House of Representatives election
Party	Candidate	Votes	%
Democratic	Marcia Hovey-Wright	21,244	73.1
Republican	Travis Shepherd	8,908	26.9
Total votes		30,152	100
Democratic hold			

2010 Michigan House of Representatives election
Party	Candidate	Votes	%
Democratic	Marcia Hovey-Wright	12,424	64.0
Republican	John McNally	6,999	36.0
Total votes		19,423	100
Democratic hold			

2008 Michigan House of Representatives election
Party	Candidate	Votes	%
Democratic	Doug Bennett	26,005	73.6
Republican	James McCormick	9,330	26.4
Total votes		35,335	100
Democratic hold			

== Historical district boundaries ==
Map	Description	Apportionment Plan	Notes
	Kent County (part): Grand Rapids (part)	1964 Apportionment Plan	
	Kent County (part): Alpine Township; Grand Rapids (part); Plainfield Township; Walker	1972 Apportionment Plan	
	Kent County (part): Grand Rapids (part)	1982 Apportionment Plan	
	Muskegon County (part): Laketon Township; Muskegon; Muskegon Heights; Muskegon Township; North Muskegon	1992 Apportionment Plan	
	Muskegon County (part): Fruitland Township; Laketon Township; Muskegon; Muskegon Heights; Muskegon Township; North Muskegon	2001 Apportionment Plan	
	Muskegon County (part): Fruitland Township; Laketon Township; Muskegon; Muskegon Heights; Muskegon Township; North Muskegon; Whitehall Township	2011 Apportionment Plan	
