= Doug Bennett (Michigan politician) =

American politician (1945–2021)

Member of the Michigan House of Representatives from the 92nd district
- In office January 1, 2005 – December 31, 2010
- Preceded by: Julie Dennis
- Succeeded by: Marcia Hovey-Wright

Personal details
- Born: October 24, 1945 Muskegon, Michigan
- Died: July 16, 2021 (aged 75) Muskegon, Michigan
- Party: Democratic
- Spouse: Helene Bennett

Douglas Bennett (October 24, 1945 – July 16, 2021) was an American politician who served in the Michigan House of Representatives from 2005 to 2010. In 2005, he was elected as a Democrat to the Michigan House of Representatives representing the 92nd district, which includes the cities of Muskegon, North Muskegon, and Muskegon Heights.

== Career ==
Bennett served as Muskegon County Commissioner 1999–2004. In 2004, he was elected to the Michigan State House to replace Julie Dennis, who retired due to term limits. He represented the 92nd District, which is overwhelmingly Democratic. He was re-elected in 2006 with little opposition. He left office at the end of 2010 due to term limits.

Bennett died in a motorcycle crash on July 16, 2021, in Muskegon, Michigan, at age 75.

Preceded by Julie Dennis	Michigan State Representative, 92nd District; 2007-2010	Succeeded by
