= Nancy L. Crandall =

American politician (born 1940)

Mayor of Norton Shores, Michigan
- In office 2002–2005
- Succeeded by: Jerry L. Wiersma

Member of the Michigan House of Representatives from the 97th district
- In office January 1, 1989 – 1990
- Preceded by: Debbie Farhat
- Succeeded by: Paul Baade

Personal details
- Born: 1940 (age 85–86)
- Party: Republican
- Spouse: Donald K. Crandall
- Children: 3
- Education: Indiana University School of Nursing

Nancy Lee Crandall (born 1940) is an American politician and a former member of the Michigan House of Representatives.

== Early life and education ==
Crandall was born in 1940.

He graduated from Morocco High School in 1957 and Indiana University School of Nursing at the Indiana University Medical Center in 1961 with a Bachelor of Science in Nursing.

== Career ==
Crandall is a nurse. Crandall served as a member of the Norton Shores City Council from 1981 to 1986. On November 8, 1988, Crandall was elected to the Michigan House of Representatives where she represented the 97th district from January 11, 1989 to 1990. Crandall served as mayor of Norton Shores, Michigan from 2002 to 2005.

== Personal life ==
Crandall is married to Donald K. Crandall. Together they had three children. Crandall is Methodist.
