= Moorland Township, Michigan =

- Township
- Location within Michigan Location within the United States
- Coordinates: 43°14′54″N 85°57′52″W
- Country: United States
- State: Michigan
- County: Muskegon

Area
  - Total: 36.5 sq mi (95 km^{2})
  - Land: 35.7 sq mi (92 km^{2})
  - Water: 0.8 sq mi (2.1 km^{2})
- Elevation: 696 ft (212 m)

Population (2020)
  - Total: 1,627
  - Density: 45.5/sq mi (17.6/km^{2})
- Time zone: UTC-5 (Eastern (EST))
  - Summer (DST): UTC-4 (EDT)
- ZIP Codes: 49451 (Ravenna); 49303 (Bailey)
- FIPS code: 26-121-55440
- GNIS feature ID: 1626765
- Website: moorlandtwp.com

Moorland Township is a civil township of Muskegon County in the U.S. state of Michigan. The population was 1,627 at the 2020 census.

== Geography ==
The township is in southeastern Muskegon County, bordered to the north by Newaygo County and at its southeast corner by Ottawa County. State highway M-46 crosses the township, leading west to Muskegon, the county seat, and east to Kent City.

According to the U.S. Census Bureau, the township has a total area of 36.4 square miles (94 km^{2}), of which 35.7 square miles (92 km^{2}) are land and 0.8 square miles (2.1 km^{2}), or 2.21%, are water. Most of the township is drained by tributaries of Black Creek, which flows southwest to Mona Lake, an arm of Lake Michigan, in Norton Shores. The southeast corner of the township is drained by Crockery Creek, a south-flowing tributary of the Grand River, while the northwest corner is drained by Mosquito Creek, which flows west to the Muskegon River.

== Demographics ==
Historical population
Census	Pop.	Note	%±
1860	105		—
1870	194		84.8%
1880	409		110.8%
1890	738		80.4%
1900	868		17.6%
1910	711		−18.1%
1920	632		−11.1%
1930	836		32.3%
1940	872		4.3%
1950	1,063		21.9%
1960	1,285		20.9%
1970	1,488		15.8%
1980	1,521		2.2%
1990	1,543		1.4%
2000	1,616		4.7%
2010	1,575		−2.5%
2020	1,627		3.3%
U.S. Decennial Census

As of the census of 2000, there were 1,616 people, 539 households, and 438 families residing in the township. The population density was 44.4 inhabitants per square mile (17.1/km^{2}). There were 561 housing units at an average density of 15.4 per square mile (5.9/km^{2}). The racial makeup of the township was 97.15% White, 0.50% African American, 0.19% Native American, 0.80% from other races, and 1.36% from two or more races. Hispanic or Latino of any race were 2.17% of the population.

There were 539 households, out of which 42.7% had children under the age of 18 living with them, 69.4% were married couples living together, 7.1% had a female householder with no husband present, and 18.6% were non-families. 14.5% of all households were made up of individuals, and 7.6% had someone living alone who was 65 years of age or older. The average household size was 2.98 and the average family size was 3.30.

In the township the population was spread out, with 30.0% under the age of 18, 8.5% from 18 to 24, 31.9% from 25 to 44, 19.9% from 45 to 64, and 9.7% who were 65 years of age or older. The median age was 34 years. For every 100 females, there were 110.7 males. For every 100 females age 18 and over, there were 106.4 males.

The median income for a household in the township was $40,669, and the median income for a family was $42,278. Males had a median income of $33,533 versus $23,235 for females. The per capita income for the township was $16,347. About 6.4% of families and 7.8% of the population were below the poverty line, including 6.4% of those under age 18 and 14.9% of those age 65 or over.
