= Edgar A. Geerlings =

American politician

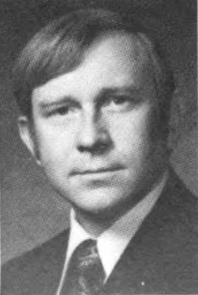

Member of the Michigan House of Representatives from the 97th district
- In office January 1, 1967 – 1986
- Preceded by: F. Charles Raap
- Succeeded by: Debbie Farhat

Personal details
- Born: April 24, 1937
- Party: Republican
- Education: Central Michigan University

Edgar A. Geerlings (born April 24, 1937) was a Michigan politician.

== Early life ==
Geerlings was born on April 24, 1937.

== Education ==
Geerlings graduated from Central Michigan University with a Bachelor's degree and a Master's degree. Geerlings did addition graduate work at the University of Michigan, Michigan State University, and Western Michigan University.

== Career ==
Geerlings was a school teacher. In 1964, Geerlings unsuccessfully ran as the Republican candidate for the Michigan House of Representatives seat representing the 97th district. On November 8, 1966, Geerlings was elected to the Michigan House of Representatives where he represented the 97th district from January 11, 1967 to 1986. In 1992, Geerlings unsuccessfully ran as the Republican candidate for the Michigan House of Representatives seat representing the 91st district.

== Personal life ==
Geerlings got married in 1959. Geerlings was part of the National Education Association. Geerlings was a member of the Reformed Church of America.
