= Holly Hughes (politician) =

American politician (born 1957)

Member of the Michigan House of Representatives from the 91st district
- In office January 1, 2015 – January 1, 2019
- Preceded by: Collene Lamonte
- Succeeded by: Greg VanWoerkom
- In office January 1, 2011 – January 1, 2013
- Preceded by: Mary Valentine
- Succeeded by: Collene Lamonte

Personal details
- Born: December 28, 1957 (age 68) Grand Rapids, Michigan
- Party: Republican
- Children: 2
- Education: Michigan State University
- Website: http://www.hollyhughes.com/

Holly Hughes (born December 28, 1957) is a former Republican National Committee member from the State of Michigan was a member of the Michigan House of Representatives from the 91st district.

== Early life ==
Hughes was born in Grand Rapids, Michigan. Hughes's father is Bern Bolema.

== Education ==
In 1981, Hughes earned a bachelor's degree in business from Michigan State University.

== Career ==
Hughes was previously a business woman in Montague, Michigan.

Hughes has been involved in grassroot politics since 1989. She has worked on numerous political campaigns from stuffing envelopes to a campaign manager. She has held several positions in public service from county and district level, and the Michigan Republican Party, including precinct Delegate, Treasurer, County Vice Chair, County Chair, District Chair and campaign county chair for George W. Bush, Spencer Abraham, Terri Land, and Mike Cox, among other noteworthy politicians. Hughes also served as a White River Township Trustee, and is a former Montague Area Public School board member. She was also appointed by Michigan Governor John Engler to the MUSTFA Board.

Hughes is also a former Republican National Committeewoman, as well as a member of the Michigan House of Representatives.

On November 4, 2008, Hughes sought a seat in the Michigan House of Representatives for district 91 but lost the election. Hughes had 46.25% of the votes and was defeated by Mary Valentine with 53.75% of the votes.

In 2010, Democrat Mary Valentine was term-limited. On November 2, 2010, Hughes won the election and became a member of Michigan House of Representatives for district 91. Hughes defeated Ben Gillette with 55.94% of the votes. On November 6, 2012, as an incumbent, Hughes lost the 2012 election for district 91. Hughes had 47.27% of the votes and was defeated by Collene Lamonte with 48.10% of the votes.

Hughes announced her intent to seek the same seat in the legislature in 2014, facing off with Representative Lamonte in a rematch, winning the election by 58 votes. She would defeat Lamonte again in 2016.

As she is term limited in 2018, she has filed to run to replace Goeff Hansen in the 34th State Senate district. She would narrowly lose the republican primary to fellow state rep Jon Bumstead 51.7% to 48.3%.

== Personal life ==
Hughes' husband is Richard. They have two daughters. Hughes and her family live in Muskegon, Michigan.

== See also ==
- 2010 Michigan House of Representatives election

Preceded by Mary Valentine	Michigan State Representative, 91st district 2011–2013	Succeeded by Collene Lamonte
Preceded by Collene Lamonte	Michigan State Representative, 91st district 2015–2019	Succeeded by Greg VanWoerkom
