= Ravenna High School =

Ravenna High School may refer to one of two high schools in the United States:

- Ravenna High School (Michigan) in Ravenna, Michigan
- Ravenna High School (Ohio) in Ravenna, Ohio
