= Laketown Township =

Laketown Township may refer to:

- Laketown Township, Michigan
- Laketown Township, Carver County, Minnesota

== See also ==
- Laketon Township, Michigan
