= West Shoreline Correctional Facility =

Former prison in Michigan, United States

- Interactive map of West Shoreline Correctional Facility
- Location: Muskegon Heights, Michigan; 43.2095104°N 86.180963°W
- Status: Closed
- Security class: Secure Level I
- Opened: 1987
- Managed by: Michigan Department of Corrections
- Warden: Acting Warden Shane Jackson
- Website: Official website

West Shoreline Correctional Facility (MTF) was a Michigan prison, located in Muskegon Heights, for adult male prisoners. It permanently closed on March 24, 2018, and has since been torn down.

== Facility ==
West Shoreline Correctional Facility was opened in 1987 as a temporary prison. It was one of three facilities for male prisoners in Muskegon and shared operations with Earnest C. Brooks Correctional Facility and Muskegon Correctional Facility. Until the early 2000s, it was known as Muskegon Temporary Facility. The facility had eight housing units, each with 120 beds, used for Michigan Department of Corrections male prisoners 18 years of age and older. Onsite facilities provided for foodservice, health care, facility maintenance, storage, prison administration, and mail room services.

In 1991, the facility was converted from a Level II facility to a Secure Level I facility.

=== Security ===
The facility was surrounded by two fences with razor-ribbon wire. Electronic detection systems and patrol vehicles were also utilized to maintain perimeter security.

== Services ==
The facility offered libraries, education programs, substance-abuse treatment, sex offender treatment, and religious services. Onsite medical and dental care was supplemented by local hospitals and the Duane L. Waters Hospital in Jackson, Michigan.

== See also ==
- List of Michigan state prisons
