= Tim Moore (Michigan politician) =

American politician

Member of the Michigan House of Representatives from the 97th district
- In office January 1, 2005 – August 5, 2010
- Preceded by: Jennifer Elkins
- Succeeded by: Joel Johnson

Personal details
- Born: April 26, 1967 (age 59)
- Party: Republican
- Spouse: Andrea
- Education: Ferris State University

Tim Moore (born April 26, 1967 in Alma, Michigan) is a Republican politician from the U.S. state of Michigan. Moore served in the Michigan House of Representatives from the 97th District from 2005 to 2010. He resigned in August 2010 to become principal of Farwell Elementary School. Before running for office, he ran the family auto part store in Farwell, Michigan. He earned a business administration degree from Ferris State University in 1989.
