= Matthew Bierlein =

American politician

Member of the Michigan House of Representatives from the 97th district
- Incumbent
- Assumed office January 1, 2023
- Preceded by: Jason Wentworth
- Succeeded by: Briar Bearss (elect)

Personal details
- Born: Matthew Bierlein; April 21, 1982 (age 44) Michigan, U.S.
- Party: Republican
- Spouse: Mindy Bierlein
- Children: 3
- Education: Spring Arbor University

Matthew Bierlein is an American politician from Michigan. Bierlein is a Republican member of the Michigan House of Representatives from District 97.

== Education ==
Bierlein is a graduate of Vassar High School. He received his bachelor's degree from Spring Arbor University.

== Career ==
Prior to his election to the Michigan House of Representatives, Matthew worked in the manufacturing industry. A native of Tuscola County, Matthew served on the Tuscola County Board of Commissioners from January 2, 2013 to January 1, 2019. While serving his county he was the boards vice-chair and also served as President of the Michigan Association of Counties and on the board of directors for the National Association of County Officers.

Between his time as a member of the Board of Commissioners and the State House, Matthew served as the district director for State Senator Kevin Daley.

Bierlein successfully ran for the 97th district in the Michigan House of Representatives in the 2022 election. He was reelected in 2024. He did not run again in 2026 and instead ran for the state senate in the 2026 Michigan Senate election.

== Personal life ==
In 2010, Matthew married Mindy Bierlein. They have three children.

== Electoral history ==
=== 2022 ===
2022 Michigan's 97th House of Representatives district election
| Party | Candidate | Votes | % |
|---|---|---|---|
| Republican | Matthew Bierlein | 28,024 | 66.6 |
| Democratic | Paul Whitney | 14,028 | 33.4 |
| Total votes | | 42,052 | 100 |

2024 Michigan's 97th House of Representatives district election
| Party | Candidate | Votes | % |
|---|---|---|---|
| Republican | Matthew Bierlein | 36,497 | 70.4 |
| Democratic | Mark Putnam | 15,378 | 29.6 |
| Total votes | | 51,875 | 100 |
