= Jennifer Elkins =

American politician

Member of the Michigan House of Representatives from the 97th district
- In office January 1, 2003 – December 31, 2004
- Preceded by: Joseph Rivet
- Succeeded by: Tim Moore

Member of the Clare County Board of Commissioners
- In office January 1, 1999 – December 31, 2002

Personal details
- Party: Democratic

Jennifer Elkins is a Democratic politician from Michigan who served one term in the Michigan House of Representatives, in 2003 and 2004, until being unseated by Tim Moore. Prior to her election to the House, Elkins was a member of the Clare County Board of Commissioners.

Elkins was passionate about youth and social services, serving as a member of the executive committee of the Mid-Michigan Community Action Agency, as vice chair of the Human Services Coordinating Body during her tenure on the county board, as a member of the Michigan Association of Counties' Human Services Committee, and with numerous other area and community organizations.
