= Jason Wentworth =

American politician (born 1982)

77th Speaker of the Michigan House of Representatives
- In office January 13, 2021 – January 1, 2023
- Preceded by: Lee Chatfield
- Succeeded by: Joe Tate

Speaker pro tempore of the Michigan House of Representatives
- In office January 9, 2019 – January 13, 2021
- Preceded by: Lee Chatfield
- Succeeded by: Pamela Hornberger

Member of the Michigan House of Representatives from the 97th district
- In office January 1, 2017 – January 1, 2023
- Preceded by: Joel Johnson
- Succeeded by: Matthew Bierlein

Personal details
- Born: September 23, 1982 (age 44) Clare, Michigan, U.S.
- Party: Republican
- Education: St. Petersburg College (BA); Central Michigan University (MA)

Jason Wentworth (born September 23, 1982) is an American politician who served as a Republican member of the Michigan House of Representatives. Prior to his election to the House, Wentworth worked for the Michigan Veterans Affairs Agency and was a member of the United States Army.

After graduating from high school, Wentworth joined the United States Army. He spent five years as a military police officer and completed a tour in South Korea. Wentworth earned his bachelor's degree from St. Petersburg College in Florida and his master's degree in leadership from Central Michigan University.

Prior to being elected to the Michigan House, he was the East Central Michigan Regional Coordinator for the Michigan Veterans Affairs Agency.

Following the 2020 Michigan House of Representatives election where the Republican caucus maintained its 58–52 majority, Wentworth was selected by his Republican colleagues to serve as Speaker of the House for the 2021-22 legislative sessions, to succeed the term-limited Lee Chatfield.

Michigan House of Representatives
Preceded by Lee Chatfield	Speaker pro tempore of the Michigan House of Representatives; 2019–2021	Succeeded by Pamela Hornberger
Political offices
Preceded by Lee Chatfield	Speaker of the Michigan House of Representatives; 2021–2023	Succeeded by Joe Tate
