= Debbie Farhat =

American politician

Member of the Michigan House of Representatives from the 97th district
- In office January 1, 1987 – 1988
- Preceded by: Edgar A. Geerlings
- Succeeded by: Nancy L. Crandall

Personal details
- Born: September 27, 1954 Muskegon, Michigan
- Party: Democratic
- Education: Central Michigan University

Debbie Farhat (born September 27, 1954) is a former member of the Michigan House of Representatives.

== Early life ==
Farhat was born on September 27, 1954, in Muskegon, Michigan.

== Education ==
Farhat graduated from Muskegon Catholic Central High School. Farhat then graduated from Central Michigan University with a Bachelor of Fine Arts in broadcasting.

== Career ==
On November 4, 1986, Farhat was elected to the Michigan House of Representatives where she represented the 97th district from January 14, 1987, to 1988. She was not re-elected in 1988.

== Personal life ==
Farhat is Catholic.
