= Greg VanWoerkom =

American politician

Member of the Michigan House of Representatives
- Incumbent
- Assumed office January 1, 2019
- Preceded by: Holly Hughes
- Constituency: 91st district (2019–2022); 88th district (2023–present)

Personal details
- Born: July 24, 1980 (age 46)
- Party: Republican
- Children: 3
- Education: Calvin College; Eastern Michigan University
- Website: Vote VanWoerkom

Greg VanWoerkom (born July 24, 1980) is a Republican politician who has served as a member of the Michigan House of Representatives since 2019. He is currently representing the 88th district.

== Political career ==
Before being elected as state representative, VanWoerkom was the district director for United States Representative Bill Huizenga. VanWoerkom also served as the senior policy adviser to United States Representative Pete Hoekstra. VanWoerkom is a member of the Covenant Life Church.

VanWoerkom successfully ran for the 91st district in the Michigan House of Representatives in 2018. He was reelected in 2020.

Following redistricting, VanWoerkom ran in the 88th district in 2022, winning reelection. He was reelected in 2024.

In 2021, VanWoerkom proposed legislation to prohibit Michigan's Secretary of State from mailing ballot applications to voters. VanWoerkom argued this was necessary to prevent "confusion among the public". This came in the wake of the 2020 elections where President Donald Trump and Michigan Republicans spread confusion about ballot applications sent by Michigan Secretary of State Jocelyn Benson to voters, conflating the ballot applications with actual ballots. VanWoerkom's proposal was part of a larger nationwide effort by Republicans to restrict voting rights in the aftermath of the 2020 elections where Donald Trump and other Republicans made false claims of fraud.

Political offices
Preceded by Holly Hughes	Michigan Representatives; 91st District; 2019–2022	Succeeded by Pat Outman
Preceded by Luke Meerman	Michigan Representatives; 88th District; 2023–present	Succeeded by Incumbent
