= Jerry Neyer =

American politician

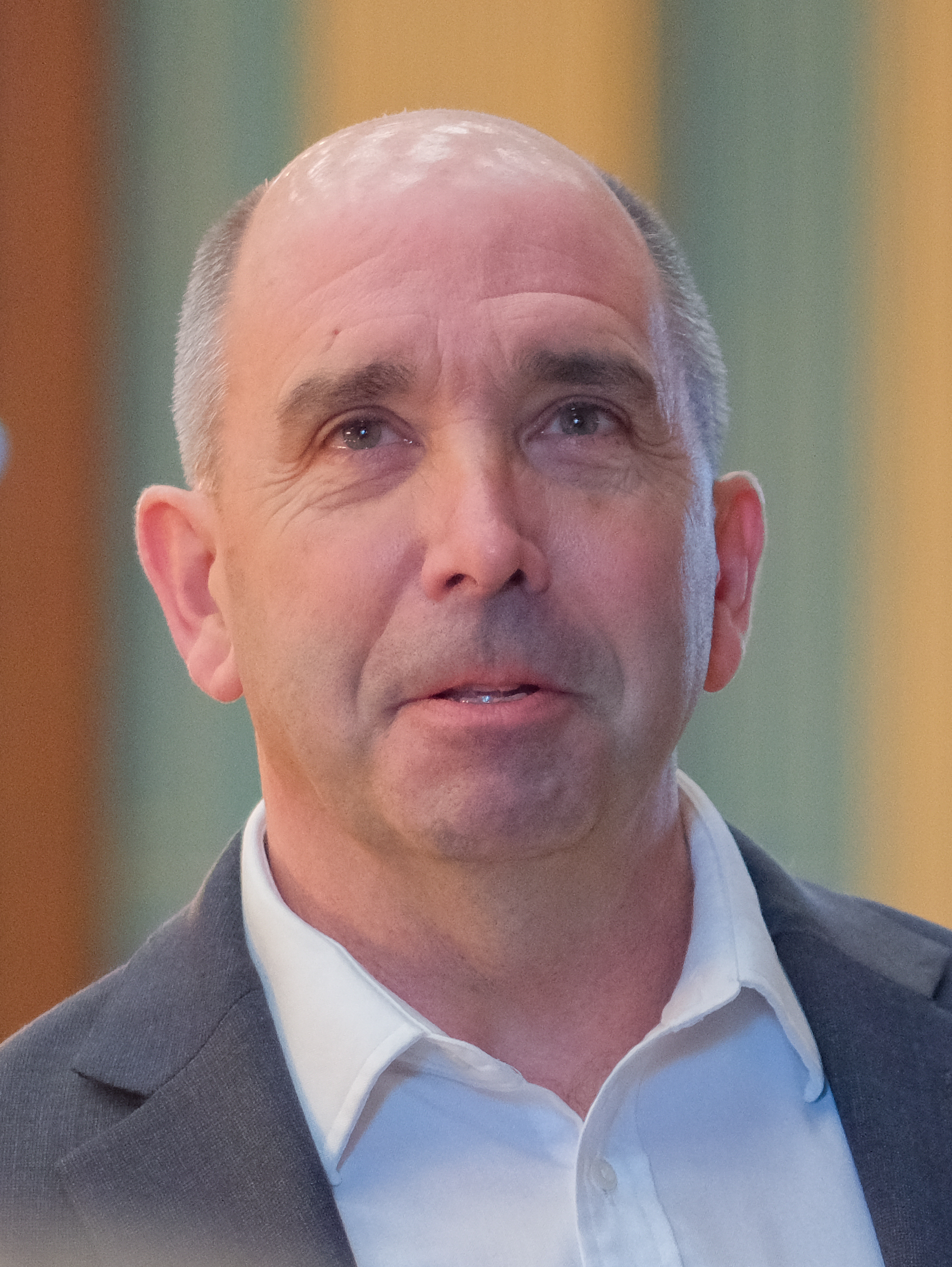
- Neyer in 2023

Member of the Michigan House of Representatives from the 92nd district
- Incumbent
- Assumed office January 1, 2023
- Preceded by: Terry Sabo

Personal details
- Party: Republican

Jerry Neyer is an American Republican politician who represents Michigan's 92nd district in the Michigan House of Representatives, serving parts of Gratiot and Isabella counties. He was first elected in 2022. He was reelected in 2024.
