= Gerald Van Woerkom =

American politician

Member of the Michigan Senate from the 34th district
- In office January 1, 2003 – December 31, 2010
- Preceded by: Joel Gougeon
- Succeeded by: Goeff Hansen

Member of the Michigan House of Representatives from the 91st district
- In office January 1, 1999 – December 31, 2002
- Preceded by: Paul Baade
- Succeeded by: David Farhat

Personal details
- Born: April 3, 1947 (age 79) Grand Haven, Michigan
- Party: Republican
- Spouse: Valerie
- Education: University of Michigan (M.A., education); Calvin College (B.A., world history)

Gerald Van Woerkom was a Republican member of both houses of the Michigan Legislature between 1999 and 2010.

Born April 3, 1947 in Grand Haven, Van Woerkom received his bachelor's degree in world history from Calvin College and a master's degree in education from the University of Michigan. He was involved in various capacities in Christian schools in Michigan for nearly 30 years, including as the superintendent of Muskegon Christian Schools from 1994 through 1997. He was also involved in the Muskegon County Local Emergency Planning Committee, the Muskegon Lake Public Advisory Committee, and the White Lake Public Advisory Committee.

Van Woerkom was elected to the Michigan House of Representatives in 1998 and served two terms. He won election to the Michigan Senate and served from 2003 through 2010.
