= Lakewood Club, Michigan =

- Village
- Location in Muskegon County and the state of Michigan
- Coordinates: 43°22′16″N 86°15′37″W
- Country: United States
- State: Michigan
- County: Muskegon
- Township: Dalton

Area
  - Total: 2.07 sq mi (5.36 km^{2})
  - Land: 1.92 sq mi (4.96 km^{2})
  - Water: 0.15 sq mi (0.40 km^{2})
- Elevation: 679 ft (207 m)

Population (2020)
  - Total: 1,340
  - Density: 700/sq mi (270.4/km^{2})
- Time zone: UTC-5 (Eastern (EST))
  - Summer (DST): UTC-4 (EDT)
- ZIP code: 49457 (Twin Lake)
- Area code: 231
- FIPS code: 26-45340
- GNIS feature ID: 1618695
- Website: villageoflakewoodclub.org

Lakewood Club is a village in Dalton Township of Muskegon County in the U.S. state of Michigan. The population was 1,340 at the 2020 census.

== Geography ==
The village is in northern Muskegon County, in the northwest corner of Dalton Township. It is 11 miles (18 km) north of Muskegon, the county seat, and 6 miles (10 km) southeast of Whitehall. U.S. Route 31 passes through the southwest corner of the village, with access from Exit 126 (White Lake Drive), just outside the northwest corner of the village.

According to the U.S. Census Bureau, the village of Lakewood Club has a total area of 2.07 square miles (5.36 km^{2}), of which 1.91 square miles (4.95 km^{2}) are land and 0.15 square miles (0.39 km^{2}), or 7.45%, are water. Fox Lake is in the northeast part of the village.

== Demographics ==
Historical population
| Census | Pop. | Note | %± |
|---|---|---|---|
| 1970 | 590 | | — |
| 1980 | 695 | | 17.8% |
| 1990 | 659 | | −5.2% |
| 2000 | 1,006 | | 52.7% |
| 2010 | 1,291 | | 28.3% |
| 2020 | 1,340 | | 3.8% |
U.S. Decennial Census

=== 2010 census ===
As of the census of 2010, there were 1,291 people, 458 households, and 345 families living in the village. The population density was 675.9 inhabitants per square mile (261.0/km^{2}). There were 507 housing units at an average density of 265.4 per square mile (102.5/km^{2}). The racial makeup of the village was 93.5% White, 1.9% African American, 1.7% Native American, 0.2% Asian, 0.1% Pacific Islander, 0.6% from other races, and 2.0% from two or more races. Hispanic or Latino of any race were 3.4% of the population.

There were 458 households, of which 44.8% had children under the age of 18 living with them, 55.7% were married couples living together, 14.2% had a female householder with no husband present, 5.5% had a male householder with no wife present, and 24.7% were non-families. 17.7% of all households were made up of individuals, and 3% had someone living alone who was 65 years of age or older. The average household size was 2.82 and the average family size was 3.15.

The median age in the village was 31.7 years. 30.4% of residents were under the age of 18; 6.5% were between the ages of 18 and 24; 35.3% were from 25 to 44; 22.2% were from 45 to 64; and 5.7% were 65 years of age or older. The gender makeup of the village was 51.0% male and 49.0% female.

=== 2000 census ===
As of the census of 2000, there were 1,006 people, 350 households, and 263 families living in the village. The population density was 531.4 inhabitants per square mile (205.2/km^{2}). There were 368 housing units at an average density of 194.4 per square mile (75.1/km^{2}). The racial makeup of the village was 90.46% White, 2.78% African American, 1.99% Native American, 0.60% Asian, 1.89% from other races, and 2.29% from two or more races. Hispanic or Latino of any race were 4.17% of the population.

There were 350 households, out of which 44.0% had children under the age of 18 living with them, 58.0% were married couples living together, 11.1% had a female householder with no husband present, and 24.6% were non-families. 19.1% of all households were made up of individuals, and 5.1% had someone living alone who was 65 years of age or older. The average household size was 2.87 and the average family size was 3.30.

In the village, the population was spread out, with 32.7% under the age of 18, 9.0% from 18 to 24, 33.5% from 25 to 44, 18.9% from 45 to 64, and 5.9% who were 65 years of age or older. The median age was 30 years. For every 100 females, there were 107.4 males. For every 100 females age 18 and over, there were 102.1 males.

The median income for a household in the village was $40,313, and the median income for a family was $41,205. Males had a median income of $36,833 versus $22,054 for females. The per capita income for the village was $13,451. About 15.6% of families and 15.5% of the population were below the poverty line, including 19.1% of those under age 18 and 16.7% of those age 65 or over.
