= Joel Johnson (Michigan politician) =

American politician

Joel C. Johnson

Member of the Michigan House of Representatives from the 97th district
- In office January 1, 2011 – December 31, 2016
- Preceded by: Tim Moore
- Succeeded by: Jason Wentworth

Personal details
- Born: July 9, 1958 (age 68) Saginaw, Michigan
- Party: Republican
- Spouse: Dawn
- Children: Four children, eight grandchildren
- Education: Michigan State University

Joel Johnson (born July 9, 1958) was a member of the Michigan House of Representatives for three terms, from 2011 through 2016. His district consisted of Clare, Gladwin, Arenac and eastern Osceola counties. In 2011 and 2012, Johnson represented northern Bay County instead of eastern Osceola.

Prior to his election to the House, Johnson was the manager of Johnston Elevator in Clare. He is also a former president of the Clare Area Chamber of Commerce, a former board member of the Clare County Farm Bureau and the Michigan Agri-Business Association, and is a member of the Clare Rotary Club.
