= Muskegon Catholic Central High School =

Location
- 1145 West Laketon Avenue; Muskegon, Michigan 49441; United States
- Coordinates: 43°13′8″N 86°16′21″W

Information
- Type: Private, Coeducational
- Religious affiliation: Roman Catholic
- Established: 1955
- President: Dr. Jerry McDowell
- Principal: Dr. Jerry McDowell
- Grades: 6–12
- Enrollment: 249
- Colors: Green and Gold
- Athletics conference: Alliance League
- Nickname: The Crusaders
- Yearbook: Michigan Non-public School Accrediting Association (MNSAA)
- Website: www.muskegoncatholic.org

Muskegon Catholic Central High School is a private, Roman Catholic high school in Muskegon, Michigan. It is located in the Roman Catholic Diocese of Grand Rapids. Muskegon Catholic Central has won 13 football state championships (1979, 1980, 1982, 1990, 1991, 1995, 2000, 2006, 2008, 2013, 2014, 2015, 2016).

== Notable alumni ==
- Debbie Farhat - former member of the Michigan House of Representatives
- Tony Ferguson - MMA fighter
- Ruvell Martin - NFL wide receiver
