= Marcia Hovey-Wright =

American politician (born 1946)

Member of the Michigan House of Representatives from the 92nd district
- In office January 1, 2011 – 2016
- Preceded by: Doug Bennett
- Succeeded by: Terry Sabo

Personal details
- Born: January 22, 1946 (age 80) Montclair, New Jersey
- Party: Democratic
- Spouse: Bill Wright
- Education: University of Michigan (M.S.W.); Aquinas College (M.S.M.); Pennsylvania State University (B.S.W.)
- Profession: Social work
- Website: State Rep. Marcia Hovey-Wright

Marcia Hovey-Wright (born 1946) is a Democratic politician from Michigan who served in the Michigan House of Representatives.

Hovey-Wright is a psychotherapist and a licensed social worker. She has been involved in numerous community organizations and boards, including her neighborhood association, parent-teacher organization and Unitarian Universalist congregation.
