= Mona Lake =

Lake in Muskegon County, Michigan, USA

- Location within Michigan Location within the United States
- Location: Muskegon County, Michigan
- Coordinates: 43°10′46″N 86°15′10″W
- Lake type: freshwater lake
- Primary outflows: Lake Michigan
- Basin countries: United States
- Surface area: 695 acres (281 ha)
- Average depth: 42 ft (13 m)
- Max. depth: 51 ft (16 m)
- Surface elevation: 581 ft (177 m)
- Settlements: Norton Shores, MI

Mona Lake is a freshwater lake located in Norton Shores just outside the city of Muskegon in the U.S. state of Michigan (Muskegon County). Mona Lake is a sandy bottom lake that flows into Lake Michigan via the Mona Lake channel. Its main tributaries are Black Creek, Celery Pond, Little Black Creek, Cress Creek and Ellis Drain

== History ==
During the mid to late 1800s the lake had numerous lumber mills. Most prominent of these was Ferry's Mill. This mill was owned by Grand Haven's Ferry family.

== Fishing ==
The lake is an exceptional fishery for big walleyes, black crappie, bluegill, channel catfish, largemouth bass, muskellunge (muskie), northern pike, smallmouth bass, white bass, salmon, and yellow perch. There is a public access boat launch with hard-surface ramps on the north shore via Mona Lake Park. Mona Lake Park features a boat launch, a covered picnic shelter, parking, lighted fishing pier, beach and sporting facilities. Mona Lake is connected to Lake Michigan by a recreational channel. The park is located nearby the I-96 and US-31 Interchange

== Parks and recreation ==
There is a boating club on Mona Lake that is open to the public. The boating club features a full service gas station dock, boat launch, full service kitchen, restrooms, tiki bar, playground, picnic areas, and a sandy beach.

On the south side of Mona Lake is Norton Shores' Ross Park, which is a 43-acre (17 ha) park located on Randall Road. Ross Park features a sandy beach area with playground equipment, a picnic area, a paved walkway and a volleyball area. There is also a boat parking area for those who want to come ashore.

Lake Harbor Park is a 189-acre (76 ha) park located on Lake Harbor Road, just north of the Mona Lake Channel. The park has over 4,000 feet (1,200 m) on Lake Michigan, 2,000 feet (610 m) on the Mona Lake Channel and 1,500 feet (460 m) on Mona Lake. The park can be accessed by foot, bike, car or boat. The walkway along Mona Lake provides an ideal fishing area. The walkway passes under the bridge and leads to a picnic area overlooking the channel, complete with tables, grills, shelter and restrooms. A scenic deck overlooking the channel was completed in 2000. Going west from this walkway, an interpretive trail leads to the dunes, a wooden walkway with observation decks and a beautiful beach on Lake Michigan.
