= Jon Bumstead =

American politician (born 1957)

Member of the Michigan Senate
- Incumbent
- Assumed office January 1, 2019
- Preceded by: Goeff Hansen
- Constituency: 34th district (2019–2022); 32nd district (2023– )

Member of the Michigan House of Representatives from the 100th district
- In office January 1, 2011 – January 1, 2017
- Preceded by: Goeff Hansen
- Succeeded by: Scott VanSingel

Personal details
- Born: July 30, 1957 (age 68) Fremont, Michigan
- Party: Republican
- Children: Jona Bumstead
- Profession: Builder
- Website: State Rep. Jon Bumstead

Jon Bumstead (born July 30, 1957) is a Republican politician from Michigan currently serving in the Michigan Senate for the 32nd district. He previously represented the 34th district.

Bumstead is the owner of Bumstead Construction for over 30 years, is a charter member of the Newaygo Jaycees, a member of several other local boards and organizations, and is a volunteer firefighter.
