= Collene Lamonte =

American politician

The Honorable Collene Lamonte

Member of the Michigan House of Representatives from the 91st district
- In office January 1, 2013 – December 31, 2014
- Preceded by: Holly Hughes
- Succeeded by: Holly Hughes

Personal details
- Party: Democratic
- Spouse: Jeff
- Profession: Teacher
- Website: State Rep. Collene Lamonte

Collene Lamonte is a Democratic politician from Michigan who served in the Michigan House of Representatives.

Prior to her election to the legislature, Lamonte was a high school math and science teacher for the Muskegon Public Schools.

In 2014, she lost her re-election bid to Holly Hughes, whom she had defeated in 2012, by only 58 votes. They faced each other again in 2016 with Hughes winning by an increased margin.

In 2018 she ran for the open 34th Senate seat, however she was upset in the Democratic primary by first time candidate Poppy Sias-Hernandez. Coincidentally, her old rival Hughes also lost in the primary for the same seat.

Preceded by Holly Hughes	Michigan State Representative, 91st District; 2013–2015	Succeeded by Holly Hughes
