= Joel Gougeon =

American politician (1943–2025)

Joel D. Gougeon

Member of the Michigan Senate from the 34th district
- In office 1993 – December 31, 2002
- Preceded by: Jim Barcia
- Succeeded by: Jim Barcia

Member of the Bay County Board of Commissioners
- In office 1984–1990

Personal details
- Born: January 13, 1943 Lansing, Michigan, U.S.
- Died: December 21, 2025 (aged 82) Saginaw, Michigan, U.S.
- Party: Republican
- Spouse: Kaye
- Children: Amy
- Awards: Distinguished Flying Cross (2); Air Medal (14)

Military service
- Allegiance: United States of America
- Branch/service: United States Air Force
- Rank: Captain
- Unit: 497th "Nite Owl" Tactical Fighter Squadron
- Battles/wars: Vietnam

Joel D. Gougeon (January 13, 1943 – December 21, 2025) was an American politician who was a Republican member of the Michigan Senate from 1993 to 2002 representing the 34th district (then Ogemaw, Arenac, Bay, Tuscola, and Huron counties). He previously served as a member of the Bay County Board of Commissioners.

Gougeon received a mechanical engineering degree in 1966 from what was then the General Motors Institute by co-oping at the Saginaw Malleable Iron Foundry. After five years in the Air Force, Gougeon and his brothers formed Gougeon Brothers, Inc., which manufactured sailboats, epoxy adhesives, and wind energy blades. The methods first developed by the Gougeon brothers using West System epoxy have become the standard techniques taught in colleges the world over for building boats using epoxy. He was also a member of a number of civic organizations, including as a past president of the Bay City Lions Club and as a founder of the Bay County Crime Stoppers.

First elected in a special election in 1993 to succeed Jim Barcia after he was elected to the U.S. House, Gougeon later won two full terms in the Michigan Senate. He served on the appropriations committee. After his retirement from the Legislature, Gougeon served as a lobbyist for Saginaw Valley State University. Gougeon was also a member of the American Legion, the Elks, and the Vietnam Veterans of America.
