= Paul Baade =

American politician

Member of the Muskegon County Board of Commissioners from the 10th District
- In office January 1, 1999 – May 3, 2005
- Succeeded by: Roger C. Wade

Member of the Michigan House of Representatives
- In office January 1, 1991 – December 31, 1998
- Preceded by: Nancy L. Crandall
- Succeeded by: Gerald Van Woerkom
- Constituency: 97th district (1991–1992); 110th district (1993–1998)

Personal details
- Born: December 14, 1940 (age 85) Muskegon, Michigan
- Party: Democratic
- Spouse: Carol Ann

Military service
- Allegiance: United States
- Branch/service: United States Army
- Years of service: 1963-1969
- Unit: 486th Engineering Company

Paul Baade (born December 14, 1940) was a Democratic member of the Michigan House of Representatives during the 1990s and later served on the Muskegon County Board of Commissioners.

A native of Muskegon, Baade worked for the Muskegon Chronicle for 26 years. He was elected to the first of four terms in the House in 1990. After leaving the House due to term limits in 1998, Baade was elected to the Muskegon County board, where he served until his retirement in 2005.

He served in the United States Army reserves in the 486th Engineer Company.
