= Cedar Creek Township, Muskegon County, Michigan =

Cedar Creek Township, Michigan
- Township
- Location within Michigan Location within the United States
- Coordinates: 43°20′31″N 86°5′44″W
- Country: United States
- State: Michigan
- County: Muskegon

Area
  - Total: 36.1 sq mi (93 km^{2})
  - Land: 34.9 sq mi (90 km^{2})
  - Water: 1.2 sq mi (3.1 km^{2})
- Elevation: 673 ft (205 m)

Population (2020)
  - Total: 3,192
  - Density: 91.5/sq mi (35.3/km^{2})
- Time zone: UTC-5 (Eastern (EST))
  - Summer (DST): UTC-4 (EDT)
- ZIP Codes: 49457 (Twin Lake); 49425 (Holton)
- FIPS code: 26-121-14100
- GNIS feature ID: 1626047
- Website: cedarcreektownship.org

Cedar Creek Township is a civil township of Muskegon County in the U.S. state of Michigan. The population was 3,192 at the 2020 census.

== Geography ==
The township is in northeastern Muskegon County, bordered to the east by Newaygo County. The center of the township is 13 miles (21 km) by road northeast of Muskegon, the county seat, and 17 miles (27 km) southwest of Fremont.

According to the U.S. Census Bureau, the township has a total area of 36.1 square miles (93 km^{2}), of which 34.9 square miles (90 km^{2}) are land and 1.2 square miles (3.1 km^{2}), or 3.21%, are water. It is drained by the Muskegon River, which crosses the southeast part of the township, and its tributary, Cedar Creek, which flows across the western part of the township.

== Demographics ==
Historical population
Census	Pop.	Note	%±
1870	660		—
1880	356		−46.1%
1890	337		−5.3%
1900	367		8.9%
1910	397		8.2%
1920	318		−19.9%
1930	382		20.1%
1940	511		33.8%
1950	781		52.8%
1960	1,224		56.7%
1970	1,467		19.9%
1980	2,454		67.3%
1990	2,846		16.0%
2000	3,109		9.2%
2010	3,186		2.5%
2020	3,192		0.2%
U.S. Decennial Census

As of the census of 2000, there were 3,109 people, 1,180 households, and 857 families residing in the township. The population density was 88.3 inhabitants per square mile (34.1/km^{2}). There were 1,303 housing units at an average density of 37.0 per square mile (14.3/km^{2}). The racial makeup of the township was 95.30% White, 1.22% African American, 0.93% Native American, 0.16% Asian, 0.74% from other races, and 1.64% from two or more races. Hispanic or Latino of any race were 2.06% of the population.

There were 1,180 households, out of which 35.3% had children under the age of 18 living with them, 54.1% were married couples living together, 13.1% had a female householder with no husband present, and 27.3% were non-families. 20.3% of all households were made up of individuals, and 5.6% had someone living alone who was 65 years of age or older. The average household size was 2.63 and the average family size was 3.02.

In the township the population was spread out, with 27.7% under the age of 18, 9.1% from 18 to 24, 30.7% from 25 to 44, 24.1% from 45 to 64, and 8.5% who were 65 years of age or older. The median age was 35 years. For every 100 females, there were 102.0 males. For every 100 females age 18 and over, there were 98.1 males.

The median income for a household in the township was $36,179, and the median income for a family was $41,944. Males had a median income of $35,504 versus $26,636 for females. The per capita income for the township was $16,775. About 10.5% of families and 10.6% of the population were below the poverty line, including 13.9% of those under age 18 and none of those age 65 or over.
