= Goeff Hansen =

American politician

Member of the Michigan Senate from the 34th district
- In office January 1, 2011 – December 31, 2018
- Preceded by: Gerald Van Woerkom
- Succeeded by: Jon Bumstead

Member of the Michigan House of Representatives from the 100th district
- In office January 1, 2005 – December 31, 2010
- Preceded by: Mike Pumford
- Succeeded by: Jon Bumstead

Personal details
- Born: Goeffrey M. Hansen; September 26, 1959 (age 66)
- Party: Republican
- Spouse: Tamara
- Children: Collin and Blake
- Website: State Senator Goeff Hansen

Goeffrey M. Hansen (born September 26, 1959) is an American Republican politician from Michigan who previously served in the Michigan Senate, having served three terms in the Michigan House of Representatives.

Prior to his election to the legislature, he was co-owner and partner of Hansen Foods. Hansen also served for four years as the supervisor of Hart Township.
