= Ravenna Township, Michigan =

- Township
- Location within Michigan Location within the United States
- Coordinates: 43°09′22″N 85°58′15″W
- Country: United States
- State: Michigan
- County: Muskegon

Area
  - Total: 36.4 sq mi (94 km^{2})
  - Land: 36.2 sq mi (94 km^{2})
  - Water: 0.2 sq mi (0.52 km^{2})
- Elevation: 709 ft (216 m)

Population (2020)
  - Total: 2,962
  - Density: 81.9/sq mi (31.6/km^{2})
- Time zone: UTC-5 (Eastern (EST))
  - Summer (DST): UTC-4 (EDT)
- ZIP codes: 49451 (Ravenna); 49403 (Conklin); 49404 (Coopersville)
- Area code: 231
- FIPS code: 26-121-67300
- GNIS feature ID: 1626954
- Website: www.ravennatwp.com

Ravenna Township is a civil township of Muskegon County in the U.S. state of Michigan. As of the 2020 census, the population was 2,962, up from 2,905 in 2010. The village of Ravenna is located within the township.

== Geography ==
The township is in southeastern Muskegon County, bordered to the south and east by Ottawa County. The village of Ravenna is in the northeast part of the township. Muskegon, the county seat, is 18 miles (29 km) to the west, and Grand Rapids is 27 miles (43 km) to the southeast.

According to the U.S. Census Bureau, the township has a total area of 36.4 square miles (94 km^{2}), of which 36.2 square miles (94 km^{2}) are land and 0.2 square miles (0.5 km^{2}), or 0.57%, are water. The township is drained by Crockery Creek, which passes through the village of Ravenna and flows southwest to join the Grand River south of Nunica.

== Demographics ==
Historical population
| Census | Pop. | Note | %± |
|---|---|---|---|
| 1860 | 367 | | — |
| 1870 | 1,035 | | 182.0% |
| 1880 | 1,189 | | 14.9% |
| 1890 | 1,466 | | 23.3% |
| 1900 | 1,492 | | 1.8% |
| 1910 | 1,439 | | −3.6% |
| 1920 | 1,280 | | −11.0% |
| 1930 | 1,208 | | −5.6% |
| 1940 | 1,468 | | 21.5% |
| 1950 | 1,544 | | 5.2% |
| 1960 | 2,105 | | 36.3% |
| 1970 | 2,403 | | 14.2% |
| 1980 | 2,471 | | 2.8% |
| 1990 | 2,354 | | −4.7% |
| 2000 | 2,856 | | 21.3% |
| 2010 | 2,905 | | 1.7% |
| 2020 | 2,962 | | 2.0% |
U.S. Decennial Census

As of the census of 2000, there were 2,856 people, 1,004 households, and 797 families residing in the township. The population density was 78.6 inhabitants per square mile (30.3/km^{2}). There were 1,044 housing units at an average density of 28.7 per square mile (11.1/km^{2}). The racial makeup of the township was 96.95% White, 0.32% African American, 0.32% Native American, 0.11% Asian, 1.51% from other races, and 0.81% from two or more races. Hispanic or Latino of any race were 3.05% of the population.

There were 1,004 households, out of which 39.1% had children under the age of 18 living with them, 66.5% were married couples living together, 8.8% had a female householder with no husband present, and 20.6% were non-families. 17.5% of all households were made up of individuals, and 8.2% had someone living alone who was 65 years of age or older. The average household size was 2.84 and the average family size was 3.21.

In the township the population was spread out, with 30.3% under the age of 18, 7.6% from 18 to 24, 31.0% from 25 to 44, 19.2% from 45 to 64, and 12.0% who were 65 years of age or older. The median age was 34 years. For every 100 females, there were 95.5 males. For every 100 females age 18 and over, there were 96.3 males.

The median income for a household in the township was $44,315, and the median income for a family was $49,113. Males had a median income of $38,429 versus $25,903 for females. The per capita income for the township was $18,440. About 6.4% of families and 8.1% of the population were below the poverty line, including 10.7% of those under age 18 and 4.7% of those age 65 or over.
