= Laketon Township, Michigan =

- Township
- Location within Michigan Location within the United States
- Coordinates: 43°16′14″N 86°19′01″W
- Country: United States
- State: Michigan
- County: Muskegon

Area
  - Total: 18.7 sq mi (48 km^{2})
  - Land: 17.4 sq mi (45 km^{2})
  - Water: 1.3 sq mi (3.4 km^{2})
- Elevation: 627 ft (191 m)

Population (2020)
  - Total: 7,626
  - Density: 437.8/sq mi (169.0/km^{2})
- Time zone: UTC-5 (Eastern (EST))
  - Summer (DST): UTC-4 (EDT)
- ZIP code: 49445 (Muskegon)
- Area code: 231
- FIPS code: 26-121-45160
- GNIS feature ID: 1626584
- Website: laketontwpmi.gov

Laketon Township is a civil township of Muskegon County in the U.S. state of Michigan. The population was 7,626 at the 2020 census.

== Geography ==
The township is in western Muskegon County, bordered to the west by Lake Michigan and to the south by the cities of Muskegon and North Muskegon. According to the U.S. Census Bureau, the township has a total area of 18.7 square miles (48 km^{2}), of which 17.4 square miles (45 km^{2}) are land and 1.3 square miles (3.4 km^{2}), or 6.97%, are water. Parts of Muskegon Lake and Bear Lake, its tributary, lie along the township's southern boundary.

== Demographics ==
Historical population
| Census | Pop. | Note | %± |
|---|---|---|---|
| 1880 | 918 | | — |
| 1890 | 614 | | −33.1% |
| 1900 | 419 | | −31.8% |
| 1910 | 343 | | −18.1% |
| 1920 | 333 | | −2.9% |
| 1930 | 639 | | 91.9% |
| 1940 | 1,077 | | 68.5% |
| 1950 | 1,901 | | 76.5% |
| 1960 | 4,114 | | 116.4% |
| 1970 | 5,440 | | 32.2% |
| 1980 | 6,327 | | 16.3% |
| 1990 | 6,538 | | 3.3% |
| 2000 | 7,363 | | 12.6% |
| 2010 | 7,563 | | 2.7% |
| 2020 | 7,626 | | 0.8% |
U.S. Decennial Census

As of the census of 2000, there were 7,363 people, 2,682 households, and 2,121 families residing in the township. The population density was 425.4 inhabitants per square mile (164.2/km^{2}). There were 2,808 housing units at an average density of 162.2 per square mile (62.6/km^{2}). The racial makeup of the township was 95.78% White, 0.77% African American, 0.57% Native American, 0.65% Asian, 0.56% from other races, and 1.67% from two or more races. Hispanic or Latino of any race were 2.05% of the population.

There were 2,682 households, out of which 37.1% had children under the age of 18 living with them, 69.6% were married couples living together, 6.0% had a female householder with no husband present, and 20.9% were non-families. 17.3% of all households were made up of individuals, and 7.2% had someone living alone who was 65 years of age or older. The average household size was 2.74 and the average family size was 3.11.

In the township the population was spread out, with 27.5% under the age of 18, 6.7% from 18 to 24, 27.6% from 25 to 44, 26.1% from 45 to 64, and 12.2% who were 65 years of age or older. The median age was 39 years. For every 100 females, there were 100.6 males. For every 100 females age 18 and over, there were 97.2 males.

The median income for a household in the township was $50,913, and the median income for a family was $57,247. Males had a median income of $40,348 versus $28,685 for females. The per capita income for the township was $21,411. About 3.6% of families and 5.6% of the population were below the poverty line, including 9.5% of those under age 18 and 4.4% of those age 65 or over.
