= Roosevelt Park, Michigan =

- City
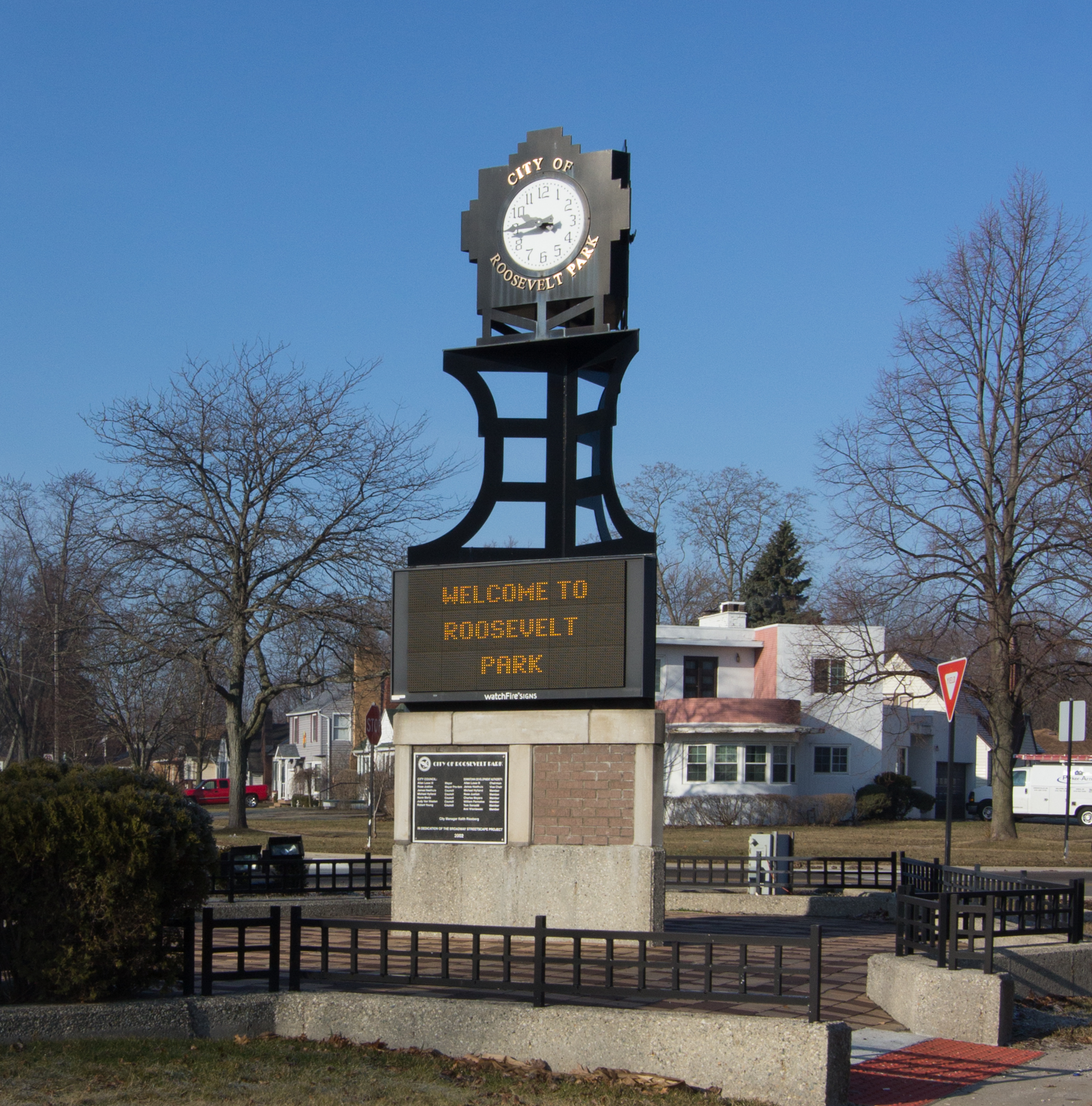
- Roosevelt Park Clock

- Location in Muskegon County and the state of Michigan
- Coordinates: 43°11′47″N 86°16′20″W
- Country: United States
- State: Michigan
- County: Muskegon

Area
  - Total: 1.03 sq mi (2.66 km^{2})
  - Land: 1.03 sq mi (2.66 km^{2})
  - Water: 0 sq mi (0.00 km^{2})
- Elevation: 620 ft (189 m)

Population (2020)
  - Total: 4,172
  - Density: 4,060.5/sq mi (1,567.75/km^{2})
- Time zone: UTC-5 (Eastern (EST))
  - Summer (DST): UTC-4 (EDT)
- ZIP code: 49441 (Muskegon)
- Area code: 231
- FIPS code: 26-69520
- GNIS feature ID: 1675441
- Website: rooseveltpark.org

Roosevelt Park is a city in Muskegon County in the U.S. state of Michigan. The population was 4,172 at the 2020 census, up from 3,831 in 2010.

== Geography ==
The city is in southwestern Muskegon County, bordered to the north by the city of Muskegon and to the south, east, and west by the city of Norton Shores. Downtown Muskegon is 3 miles (5 km) to the north, and Muskegon Heights is 1 mile (1.6 km) to the east.

According to the U.S. Census Bureau, the city of Roosevelt Park has a total area of 1.03 square miles (2.67 km^{2}), all land.

== Demographics ==
Historical population
Census	Pop.	Note	%±
1950	1,254		—
1960	2,578		105.6%
1970	4,176		62.0%
1980	4,015		−3.9%
1990	3,885		−3.2%
2000	3,890		0.1%
2010	3,831		−1.5%
2020	4,172		8.9%
U.S. Decennial Census

=== 2020 census ===
As of the 2020 census, Roosevelt Park had a population of 4,172. The median age was 35.5 years. 22.4% of residents were under the age of 18 and 17.0% of residents were 65 years of age or older. For every 100 females there were 91.5 males, and for every 100 females age 18 and over there were 87.1 males age 18 and over.

100.0% of residents lived in urban areas, while 0.0% lived in rural areas.

There were 1,843 households in Roosevelt Park, of which 29.0% had children under the age of 18 living in them. Of all households, 36.5% were married-couple households, 20.9% were households with a male householder and no spouse or partner present, and 33.2% were households with a female householder and no spouse or partner present. About 36.3% of all households were made up of individuals and 14.4% had someone living alone who was 65 years of age or older.

There were 1,934 housing units, of which 4.7% were vacant. The homeowner vacancy rate was 0.7% and the rental vacancy rate was 7.4%.

Racial composition as of the 2020 census
Race	Number	Percent
White	3,334	79.9%
Black or African American	411	9.9%
American Indian and Alaska Native	35	0.8%
Asian	71	1.7%
Native Hawaiian and Other Pacific Islander	3	0.1%
Some other race	48	1.2%
Two or more races	270	6.5%
Hispanic or Latino (of any race)	236	5.7%

=== 2010 census ===
As of the census of 2010, there were 3,831 people, 1,731 households, and 979 families living in the city. The population density was 3,719.4 inhabitants per square mile (1,436.1/km^{2}). There were 1,925 housing units at an average density of 1,868.9 per square mile (721.6/km^{2}). The racial makeup of the city was 85.9% White, 8.4% African American, 0.6% Native American, 1.6% Asian, 1.1% from other races, and 2.4% from two or more races. Hispanic or Latino of any race were 3.9% of the population.

There were 1,731 households, of which 28.5% had children under the age of 18 living with them, 38.2% were married couples living together, 12.9% had a female householder with no husband present, 5.4% had a male householder with no wife present, and 43.4% were non-families. 37.5% of all households were made up of individuals, and 15.3% had someone living alone who was 65 years of age or older. The average household size was 2.19 and the average family size was 2.90.

The median age in the city was 38.3 years. 23.8% of residents were under the age of 18; 9.6% were between the ages of 18 and 24; 24.8% were from 25 to 44; 24.5% were from 45 to 64; and 17.2% were 65 years of age or older. The gender makeup of the city was 47.5% male and 52.5% female.

=== 2000 census ===
As of the census of 2000, there were 3,890 people, 1,773 households, and 1,056 families living in the city. The population density was 3,865.3 inhabitants per square mile (1,492.4/km^{2}). There were 1,896 housing units at an average density of 1,884.0 per square mile (727.4/km^{2}). The racial makeup of the city was 93.34% White, 3.14% African American, 0.46% Native American, 1.05% Asian, 0.05% Pacific Islander, 0.62% from other races, and 1.34% from two or more races. Hispanic or Latino of any race were 1.95% of the population.

There were 1,773 households, out of which 24.5% had children under the age of 18 living with them, 47.5% were married couples living together, 8.9% had a female householder with no husband present, and 40.4% were non-families. 36.6% of all households were made up of individuals, and 17.3% had someone living alone who was 65 years of age or older. The average household size was 2.16 and the average family size was 2.85.

In the city, the population was spread out, with 22.2% under the age of 18, 6.5% from 18 to 24, 26.3% from 25 to 44, 21.4% from 45 to 64, and 23.6% who were 65 years of age or older. The median age was 41 years. For every 100 females, there were 86.3 males. For every 100 females age 18 and over, there were 81.1 males.

The median income for a household in the city was $37,035, and the median income for a family was $47,043. Males had a median income of $36,917 versus $30,118 for females. The per capita income for the city was $19,825. About 2.6% of families and 4.8% of the population were below the poverty line, including 6.1% of those under age 18 and 3.5% of those age 65 or over.

== Images ==
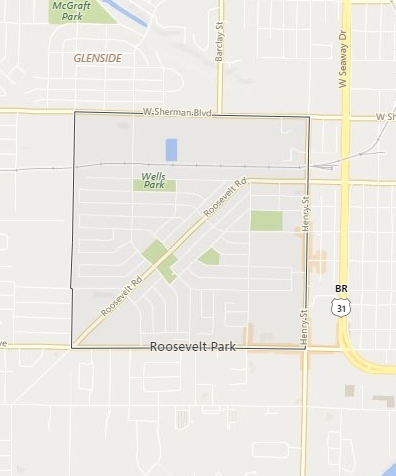
One Square Mile City

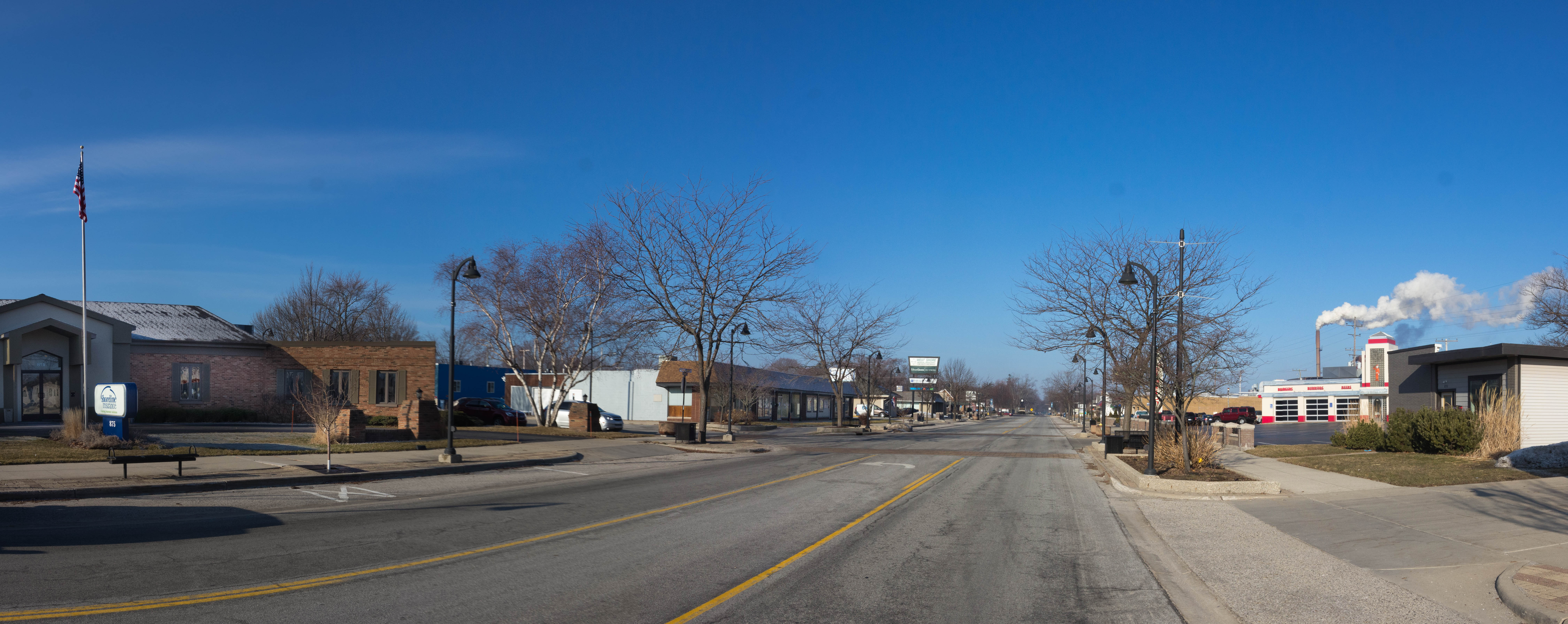
Business District on West Broadway

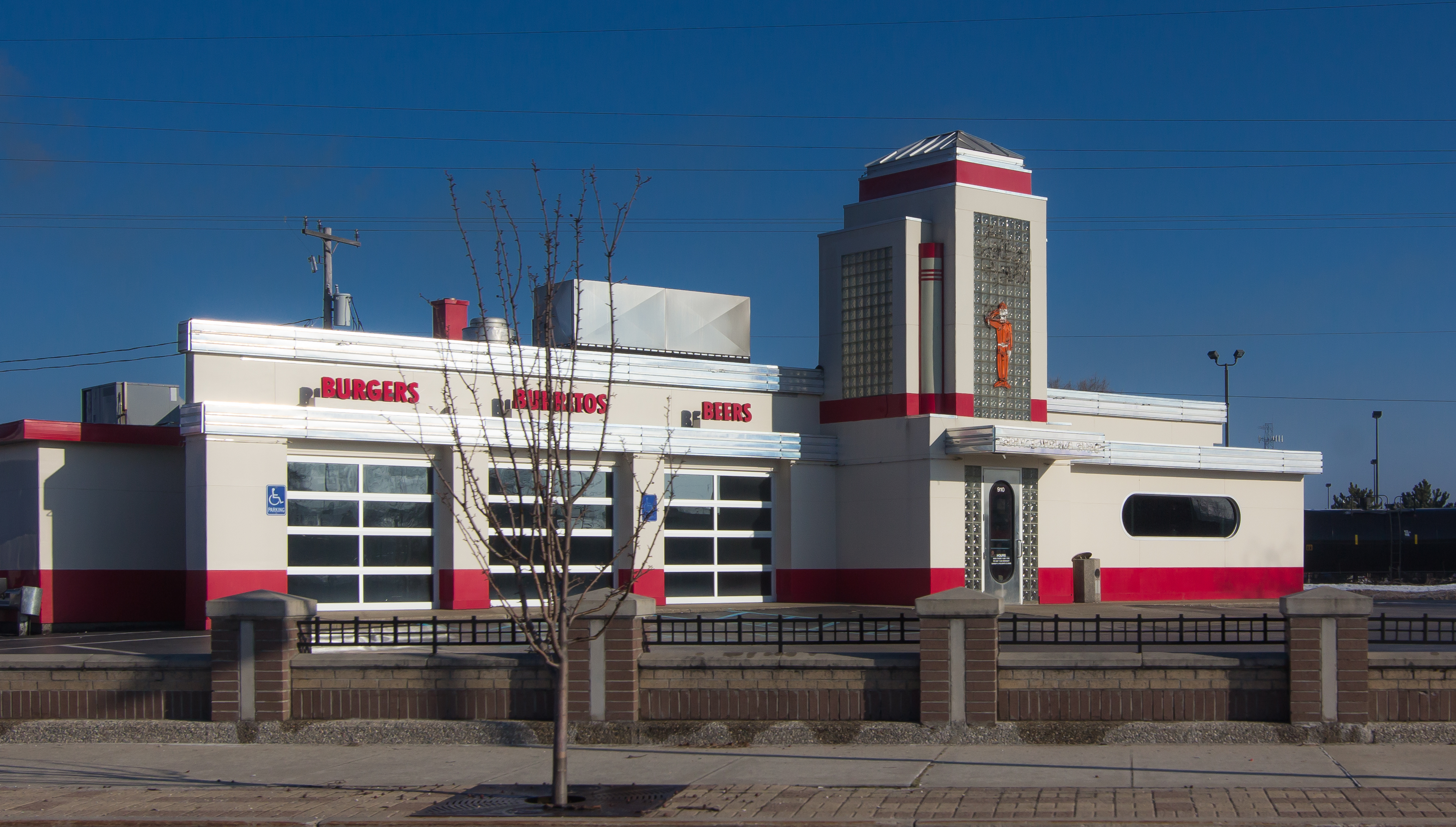
The Station Grill
