= Dalton Township, Michigan =

- Township
- Location within Michigan Location within the United States
- Coordinates: 43°19′54″N 86°13′18″W
- Country: United States
- State: Michigan
- County: Muskegon

Area
  - Total: 36.3 sq mi (94 km^{2})
  - Land: 35.3 sq mi (91 km^{2})
  - Water: 1.0 sq mi (2.6 km^{2})
- Elevation: 676 ft (206 m)

Population (2020)
  - Total: 9,427
  - Density: 267/sq mi (103/km^{2})
- Time zone: UTC-5 (Eastern (EST))
  - Summer (DST): UTC-4 (EDT)
- ZIP Codes: 49445 (Muskegon); 49457 (Twin Lake)
- FIPS code: 26-121-19660
- GNIS feature ID: 1626157
- Website: daltontownship.org

Dalton Township is a civil township of Muskegon County in the U.S. state of Michigan. As of the 2020 census, the township population was 9,427.

== History ==
Dalton Township was established in 1859.

== Geography ==
The township is in central Muskegon County, north of Muskegon, the county seat, and southeast of Whitehall. U.S. Route 31 crosses the township from northwest to south as a four-lane freeway, with access from Exits 118, 121, and 126. State highway M-120 crosses the east side of the township, passing through the community of Twin Lake.

According to the U.S. Census Bureau, the township has a total area of 36.3 square miles (94 km^{2}), of which 35.3 square miles (91 km^{2}) are land and 1.0 square mile (2.6 km^{2}), or 2.71%, are water.

=== Communities ===
- Lakewood Club is a village in the northwest corner of the township.
- Twin Lake is an unincorporated community and census-designated place on M-120 in the northeast part of the township with ZIP code 49457.
- Califf Station was a depot on the Chicago and West Michigan Railroad beginning in 1874.
- Dalton is an unincorporated community at 43°19′07″N 86°15′42″W in the southwest part of the township, with ZIP code 49445.

== Demographics ==
Historical population
Census	Pop.	Note	%±
1860	258		—
1870	401		55.4%
1880	471		17.5%
1890	638		35.5%
1900	815		27.7%
1910	822		0.9%
1920	652		−20.7%
1930	1,080		65.6%
1940	1,703		57.7%
1950	3,113		82.8%
1960	4,366		40.3%
1970	5,361		22.8%
1980	5,897		10.0%
1990	6,276		6.4%
2000	8,047		28.2%
2010	9,300		15.6%
2020	9,427		1.4%
U.S. Decennial Census

As of the census of 2000, there were 8,047 people, 2,871 households, and 2,247 families residing in the township. The population density was 225.5 inhabitants per square mile (87.1/km^{2}). There were 3,064 housing units at an average density of 85.9 per square mile (33.2/km^{2}). The racial makeup of the township was 93.34% White, 2.31% African American, 1.30% Native American, 0.20% Asian, 0.93% from other races, and 1.91% from two or more races. Hispanic or Latino of any race were 2.87% of the population.

There were 2,871 households, out of which 39.9% had children under the age of 18 living with them, 63.6% were married couples living together, 9.4% had a female householder with no husband present, and 21.7% were non-families. 17.4% of all households were made up of individuals, and 6.1% had someone living alone who was 65 years of age or older. The average household size was 2.80 and the average family size was 3.14.

In the township the population was spread out, with 29.0% under the age of 18, 8.7% from 18 to 24, 30.3% from 25 to 44, 23.5% from 45 to 64, and 8.4% who were 65 years of age or older. The median age was 34 years. For every 100 females, there were 103.9 males. For every 100 females age 18 and over, there were 100.4 males.

The median income for a household in the township was $47,127, and the median income for a family was $50,096. Males had a median income of $37,743 versus $25,433 for females. The per capita income for the township was $18,036. About 3.8% of families and 5.9% of the population were below the poverty line, including 5.6% of those under age 18 and 7.0% of those age 65 or over.
