= Ravenna, Michigan =

- Village
- Location in Muskegon County and the state of Michigan
- Coordinates: 43°11′22″N 85°56′13″W
- Country: United States
- State: Michigan
- County: Muskegon
- Township: Ravenna

Area
  - Total: 1.19 sq mi (3.09 km^{2})
  - Land: 1.19 sq mi (3.08 km^{2})
  - Water: 0 sq mi (0.00 km^{2})
- Elevation: 673 ft (205 m)

Population (2020)
  - Total: 1,308
  - Density: 1,098.3/sq mi (424.07/km^{2})
- Time zone: UTC-5 (Eastern (EST))
  - Summer (DST): UTC-4 (EDT)
- ZIP code: 49451
- Area code: 231
- FIPS code: 26-67280
- GNIS feature ID: 1618856
- Website: www.ravennami.com

Ravenna is a village in Muskegon County in the U.S. state of Michigan. The population was 1,308 at the 2020 census. The village is located in Ravenna Township.

== Geography ==
Ravenna in southeastern Muskegon County, in the northeast part of Ravenna Township. It is 17 miles (27 km) east of Muskegon, the county seat, 9 miles (14 km) north of Coopersville, and 23 miles (37 km) northwest of Grand Rapids.

According to the U.S. Census Bureau, Ravenna has a total area of 1.19 square miles (3.08 km^{2}), all of it recorded as land. Crockery Creek passes through the east side of the village, flowing southwest to join the Grand River east of Grand Haven.

== Education ==
Public elementary and secondary education is provided by the Ravenna Public Schools. The district covers most of Ravenna and Sullivan townships in Muskegon County, along with northwestern Chester Township in Ottawa County.

Ravenna Public Schools is a small rural district with three schools—Beecham Elementary School for students in preschool through grade four, Ravenna Middle School for grades five through eight, and Ravenna High School for grades nine through twelve. Beechnau is located in the village along with the school district offices, while both the middle and high schools are located on a campus just north of the village limits that includes a football stadium, track, athletic fields, and the district bus garage. Ravenna is also the district of record for the North East Education Center, which is located in Muskegon and serves emotionally impaired students from most of the schools in Muskegon County. The schools offer many extracurricular activities both in sports and academics. Ravenna also has one private elementary school, Divine Providence Academy, which has a campus at St. Catherine parish. The school is part of the Roman Catholic Diocese of Grand Rapids and has students from preschool through Kindergarten.

== Demographics ==
Historical population
Census	Pop.	Note	%±
1930	343		—
1940	451		31.5%
1950	551		22.2%
1960	801		45.4%
1970	1,048		30.8%
1980	951		−9.3%
1990	919		−3.4%
2000	1,206		31.2%
2010	1,219		1.1%
2020	1,308		7.3%
U.S. Decennial Census

=== 2010 census ===
As of the census of 2010, there were 1,219 people, 454 households, and 325 families living in the village. The population density was 1,007.4 inhabitants per square mile (389.0/km^{2}). There were 476 housing units at an average density of 393.4 per square mile (151.9/km^{2}). The racial makeup of the village was 94.0% White, 0.2% African American, 0.7% Native American, 3.4% from other races, and 1.7% from two or more races. Hispanic or Latino of any race were 6.4% of the population.

There were 454 households, of which 40.7% had children under the age of 18 living with them, 55.7% were married couples living together, 11.5% had a female householder with no husband present, 4.4% had a male householder with no wife present, and 28.4% were non-families. 24.7% of all households were made up of individuals, and 12.1% had someone living alone who was 65 years of age or older. The average household size was 2.67 and the average family size was 3.18.

The median age in the village was 35.2 years. 29% of residents were under the age of 18; 7.7% were between the ages of 18 and 24; 27.2% were from 25 to 44; 22.5% were from 45 to 64; and 13.5% were 65 years of age or older. The gender makeup of the village was 49.0% male and 51.0% female.

=== 2000 census ===
As of the census of 2000, there were 1,206 people, 437 households, and 340 families living in the village. The population density was 958.1 inhabitants per square mile (369.9/km^{2}). There were 455 housing units at an average density of 361.5 per square mile (139.6/km^{2}). The racial makeup of the village was 97.26% White, 0.41% Native American, 0.08% Asian, 1.24% from other races, and 1.00% from two or more races. Hispanic or Latino of any race were 1.74% of the population.

There were 437 households, out of which 40.3% had children under the age of 18 living with them, 65.2% were married couples living together, 8.7% had a female householder with no husband present, and 22.0% were non-families. 19.0% of all households were made up of individuals, and 10.1% had someone living alone who was 65 years of age or older. The average household size was 2.76 and the average family size was 3.16.

In the village, the population was spread out, with 30.1% under the age of 18, 7.4% from 18 to 24, 32.0% from 25 to 44, 18.7% from 45 to 64, and 11.9% who were 65 years of age or older. The median age was 33 years. For every 100 females, there were 90.8 males. For every 100 females age 18 and over, there were 89.9 males.

The median income for a household in the village was $47,167, and the median income for a family was $51,458. Males had a median income of $40,426 versus $28,646 for females. The per capita income for the village was $19,197. About 1.7% of families and 3.7% of the population were below the poverty line, including 3.4% of those under age 18 and 2.2% of those age 65 or over.

== Notable people ==
- Todd Herremans, football player
- Donnie Tyndall, college basketball coach
