= North Muskegon, Michigan =

- City
- Location in Muskegon County and the state of Michigan
- Coordinates: 43°15′22″N 86°16′03″W
- Country: United States
- State: Michigan
- County: Muskegon

Government
  - Type: Council-manager
  - Mayor: Sabina Freeman
  - City Manager: Sam Janson

Area
  - Total: 4.12 sq mi (10.67 km^{2})
  - Land: 1.79 sq mi (4.63 km^{2})
  - Water: 2.33 sq mi (6.03 km^{2})
- Elevation: 620 ft (189 m)

Population (2020)
  - Total: 4,093
  - Density: 2,287.1/sq mi (883.07/km^{2})
- Time zone: UTC-5 (Eastern (EST))
  - Summer (DST): UTC-4 (EDT)
- ZIP code: 49445
- Area code: 231
- FIPS code: 26-58640
- GNIS feature ID: 1621049
- Website: www.northmuskegon.org

North Muskegon is a city in Muskegon County in the U.S. state of Michigan. The population was 4,093 at the 2020 census, up from 3,786 in the 2010 census.

== Geography ==
The city is located in western Muskegon County on the northern side of Muskegon Lake, an arm of Lake Michigan. It is bordered to the south, across the lake, by the city of Muskegon, the county seat. The Muskegon River flows into Muskegon Lake in the eastern part of the city. The lake's outlet channel to Lake Michigan is one mile west of the city limits.

According to the U.S. Census Bureau, North Muskegon has a total area of 4.12 square miles (10.67 km^{2}), of which 1.79 square miles (4.64 km^{2}) is land and 2.33 square miles (6.03 km^{2}), or 56.5%, is water.

== Demographics ==
Historical population
Census	Pop.	Note	%±
1890	1,590		—
1900	513		−67.7%
1910	352		−31.4%
1920	630		79.0%
1930	1,370		117.5%
1940	1,694		23.6%
1950	2,424		43.1%
1960	3,855		59.0%
1970	4,243		10.1%
1980	4,024		−5.2%
1990	3,919		−2.6%
2000	4,031		2.9%
2010	3,786		−6.1%
2020	4,093		8.1%
U.S. Decennial Census

=== 2020 census ===
As of the 2020 census, North Muskegon had a population of 4,093. The median age was 44.4 years. 21.7% of residents were under the age of 18 and 23.7% of residents were 65 years of age or older. For every 100 females there were 88.4 males, and for every 100 females age 18 and over there were 85.4 males age 18 and over.

100.0% of residents lived in urban areas, while 0.0% lived in rural areas.

There were 1,671 households in North Muskegon, of which 28.7% had children under the age of 18 living in them. Of all households, 52.8% were married-couple households, 14.1% were households with a male householder and no spouse or partner present, and 27.5% were households with a female householder and no spouse or partner present. About 29.5% of all households were made up of individuals and 14.7% had someone living alone who was 65 years of age or older.

There were 1,761 housing units, of which 5.1% were vacant. The homeowner vacancy rate was 1.7% and the rental vacancy rate was 0.6%.

Racial composition as of the 2020 census
Race	Number	Percent
White	3,618	88.4%
Black or African American	87	2.1%
American Indian and Alaska Native	25	0.6%
Asian	55	1.3%
Native Hawaiian and Other Pacific Islander	3	0.1%
Some other race	40	1.0%
Two or more races	265	6.5%
Hispanic or Latino (of any race)	172	4.2%

=== 2010 census ===
As of the census of 2010, there were 3,786 people, 1,621 households, and 1,069 families living in the city. The population density was 2,151.1 inhabitants per square mile (830.5/km^{2}). There were 1,834 housing units at an average density of 1,042.0 per square mile (402.3/km^{2}). The racial makeup of the city was 94.6% White, 2.1% African American, 0.6% Native American, 0.7% Asian, 0.1% Pacific Islander, 0.2% from other races, and 1.8% from two or more races. Hispanic or Latino of any race were 2.4% of the population.

There were 1,621 households, of which 29.2% had children under the age of 18 living with them, 51.9% were married couples living together, 11.4% had a female householder with no husband present, 2.7% had a male householder with no wife present, and 34.1% were non-families. 30.0% of all households were made up of individuals, and 16.6% had someone living alone who was 65 years of age or older. The average household size was 2.30 and the average family size was 2.84.

The median age in the city was 45 years. 22.7% of residents were under the age of 18; 7.3% were between the ages of 18 and 24; 20% were from 25 to 44; 29.4% were from 45 to 64; and 20.6% were 65 years of age or older. The gender makeup of the city was 46.7% male and 53.3% female.

=== 2000 census ===
As of the census of 2000, there were 4,031 people, 1,610 households, and 1,135 families living in the city. The population density was 2,259.2 inhabitants per square mile (872.3/km^{2}). There were 1,685 housing units at an average density of 944.4 per square mile (364.6/km^{2}). The racial makeup of the city was 97.22% White, 1.02% African American, 0.20% Native American, 0.37% Asian, 0.02% Pacific Islander, 0.35% from other races, and 0.82% from two or more races. Hispanic or Latino of any race were 1.31% of the population.

There were 1,610 households, out of which 31.7% had children under the age of 18 living with them, 58.1% were married couples living together, 8.9% had a female householder with no husband present, and 29.5% were non-families. 26.8% of all households were made up of individuals, and 13.6% had someone living alone who was 65 years of age or older. The average household size was 2.41 and the average family size was 2.92.

In the city, the population was spread out, with 24.9% under the age of 18, 5.8% from 18 to 24, 23.4% from 25 to 44, 25.9% from 45 to 64, and 20.1% who were 65 years of age or older. The median age was 43 years. For every 100 females, there were 90.7 males. For every 100 females age 18 and over, there were 86.3 males.

The median income for a household in the city was $55,063, and the median income for a family was $63,819. Males had a median income of $47,681 versus $31,695 for females. The per capita income for the city was $27,140. About 1.9% of families and 3.4% of the population were below the poverty line, including 3.9% of those under age 18 and 3.7% of those age 65 or over.
