= Norton Shores, Michigan =

- City
- Location in Muskegon County and the state of Michigan
- Coordinates: 43°10′08″N 86°15′50″W
- Country: United States
- State: Michigan
- County: Muskegon
- Norton Township: 1845
- City of Norton Shores: 1968

Government
  - Mayor: Gary Nelund

Area
  - Total: 24.63 sq mi (63.78 km^{2})
  - Land: 23.24 sq mi (60.20 km^{2})
  - Water: 1.38 sq mi (3.58 km^{2})
- Elevation: 614 ft (187 m)

Population (2020)
  - Total: 25,030
  - Density: 1,076.9/sq mi (415.78/km^{2})
- Time zone: UTC-5 (Eastern (EST))
  - Summer (DST): UTC-4 (EDT)
- ZIP codes: 49441, 49444 (Muskegon); 49456 (Spring Lake)
- Area code: 231
- FIPS code: 26-59140
- GNIS feature ID: 0633743
- Website: www.nortonshores.org

Norton Shores is a city in Muskegon County in the U.S. state of Michigan. The population was 25,030 at the 2020 census.

== History ==
The Ojibwe, Bodewadmi and Odawa Native Americans for hundreds of years occupied the wilds of western Michigan. When European immigrants arrived, they found openings in the forest made by the Native Americans, which were used to raise food.

Norton Township was originally organized in 1845 by settlers of the village of Mill Point (now Spring Lake). The township was named in honor of Col. Amos Norton, a Canadian patriot who was implicated in the rebellion of 1837.

Norton Township was part of Ottawa County and also included the townships of Fruitport and Sullivan. In 1855 Spring Lake Township was detached from Norton and organized as a township in Ottawa County. Also in 1855 the village of Black Lake was settled with a railroad station and a sawmill in Norton Township. Norton Township was separated from Ottawa County in 1859 and became a part of Muskegon County. The population of Norton Township in 1860 was 197 and in 1864 was 229.

In 1847 the first sawmill in Norton Township was built. It was known as Robinson's Mill and was located at the head of Black Lake (now known as Mona Lake).

In 1850, Ira Porter arrived at Mona Lake. He operated Porter Sawmill and a fruit farm. One of the largest fruit farms in Norton Township was operated by G. N. Cobb, who also operated a box factory for fifteen years beginning in 1869. With the closing of the sawmills and the box factory, residents turned to raising fruit, which became a very profitable industry. Boats would enter Lake Harbor and make a trip around the lake picking up crates of berries at the docks of the growers. They would then return to Lake Michigan with their cargo and transfer it to large steamers bound for Chicago.

In 1894 a summer resort community called Hackley Park was established on Lake Michigan and Mona Lake. It was named for Charles Hackley. The name was shortened to "Hackley" when it got a post office in 1895, although the post office closed in 1897. Roosevelt Park was built as a subdivision in 1926 and incorporated as a city in 1946. The remainder of the township was incorporated as the City of Norton Shores in 1968; the move protected it from annexation by nearby cities.

== Geography ==
The city is in southwestern Muskegon County, bordered to the west by Lake Michigan and to the south by Ottawa County. The cities of Muskegon, Roosevelt Park, and Muskegon Heights border Norton Shores to the north.

Norton Shores has a total area of 24.6 square miles (64 km^{2}), of which 1.4 square miles (3.63 km^{2}), or 5.6%, are water. Mona Lake, is in the northern part of the city, while Little Black Lake is in the south. Hoffmaster State Park is in the western part of the city, occupying forested dune complexes along the Lake Michigan shoreline.

The city offers educational opportunities from the Mona Shores Public Schools to Muskegon Community College, Baker College and Grand Valley State University.

== Demographics ==
Historical population
Census	Pop.	Note	%±
1970	22,271		—
1980	22,025		−1.1%
1990	21,755		−1.2%
2000	22,527		3.5%
2010	23,994		6.5%
2020	25,030		4.3%
U.S. Decennial Census

=== 2020 census ===
As of the 2020 census, Norton Shores had a population of 25,030. The median age was 43.3 years. 21.2% of residents were under the age of 18 and 21.8% of residents were 65 years of age or older. For every 100 females there were 94.0 males, and for every 100 females age 18 and over there were 91.8 males age 18 and over.

98.1% of residents lived in urban areas, while 1.9% lived in rural areas.

There were 10,406 households in Norton Shores, of which 26.8% had children under the age of 18 living in them. Of all households, 50.1% were married-couple households, 16.8% were households with a male householder and no spouse or partner present, and 26.3% were households with a female householder and no spouse or partner present. About 28.8% of all households were made up of individuals and 14.3% had someone living alone who was 65 years of age or older.

There were 11,055 housing units, of which 5.9% were vacant. The homeowner vacancy rate was 1.0% and the rental vacancy rate was 6.0%.

Racial composition as of the 2020 census
Race	Number	Percent
White	21,670	86.6%
Black or African American	912	3.6%
American Indian and Alaska Native	120	0.5%
Asian	342	1.4%
Native Hawaiian and Other Pacific Islander	4	0.0%
Some other race	319	1.3%
Two or more races	1,663	6.6%
Hispanic or Latino (of any race)	1,299	5.2%

=== 2010 census ===
As of the census of 2010, there were 23,994 people, 9,977 households, and 6,667 families residing in the city. The population density was 1,032.4 inhabitants per square mile (398.6/km^{2}). There were 10,939 housing units at an average density of 470.7 per square mile (181.7/km^{2}). The racial makeup of the city was 91.8% White, 3.2% African American, 0.8% Native American, 1.2% Asian, 1.0% from other races, and 2.0% from two or more races. Hispanic or Latino residents of any race were 3.8% of the population.

There were 9,977 households, of which 28.5% had children under the age of 18 living with them, 52.8% were married couples living together, 10.1% had a female householder with no husband present, 3.9% had a male householder with no wife present, and 33.2% were non-families. 27.6% of all households were made up of individuals, and 12.4% had someone living alone who was 65 years of age or older. The average household size was 2.39 and the average family size was 2.90.

The median age in the city was 43.3 years. 22% of residents were under the age of 18; 8.1% were between the ages of 18 and 24; 22.3% were from 25 to 44; 29.9% were from 45 to 64; and 17.8% were 65 years of age or older. The gender makeup of the city was 48.6% male and 51.4% female.

=== 2000 census ===
As of the census of 2000, there were 22,527 people, 8,996 households, and 6,396 families residing in the city. The population density was 969.2 inhabitants per square mile (374.2/km^{2}). There were 9,679 housing units at an average density of 416.4 per square mile (160.8/km^{2}). The racial makeup of the city was 94.63% White, 1.63% African American, 0.73% Native American, 0.84% Asian, 0.01% Pacific Islander, 0.63% from other races, and 1.53% from two or more races. Hispanic or Latino of any race were 2.69% of the population.

There were 8,996 households, out of which 30.7% had children under the age of 18 living with them, 60.0% were married couples living together, 8.1% had a female householder with no husband present, and 28.9% were non-families. 24.9% of all households were made up of individuals, and 11.7% had someone living alone who was 65 years of age or older. The average household size was 2.48 and the average family size was 2.97.

In the city, 24.8% of the population was under the age of 18, 6.6% was from 18 to 24, 25.8% from 25 to 44, 25.5% from 45 to 64, and 17.3% was 65 years of age or older. The median age was 41 years. For every 100 females, there were 94.3 males. For every 100 females age 18 and over, there were 91.2 males.

The median income for a household in the city was $45,457, and the median income for a family was $53,447. Males had a median income of $38,115 versus $26,728 for females. The per capita income for the city was $22,713. About 3.7% of families and 5.3% of the population were below the poverty line, including 6.3% of those under age 18 and 3.0% of those age 65 or over.

== Climate ==
This climatic region is typified by large seasonal temperature differences, with warm to hot (and often humid) summers and cold (sometimes severely cold) winters. According to the Köppen Climate Classification system, Norton Shores has a humid continental climate, abbreviated "Dfb" on climate maps.

== Government ==
Norton Shores is governed by a mayor and city council who are elected in a non-partisan elections. The mayor (Gary Nelund) is elected along with four city council members in citywide elections while the remaining four city council members are elected by one of the city's two wards in the alternating two years.
