= Muskegon Heights, Michigan =

- City
- Location in Muskegon County and the state of Michigan
- Coordinates: 43°12′04″N 86°14′20″W
- Country: United States
- State: Michigan
- County: Muskegon

Government
  - Mayor: Bonnie McGlothin

Area
  - Total: 3.19 sq mi (8.25 km^{2})
  - Land: 3.19 sq mi (8.25 km^{2})
  - Water: 0 sq mi (0.00 km^{2})
- Elevation: 620 ft (190 m)

Population (2020)
  - Total: 9,917
  - Density: 3,113.3/sq mi (1,202.05/km^{2})
- Time zone: UTC-5 (Eastern (EST))
  - Summer (DST): UTC-4 (EDT)
- ZIP code: 49444
- Area code: 231
- FIPS code: 26-56360
- GNIS feature ID: 0633165
- Website: muskegonheights.us

Muskegon Heights is a city in Muskegon County in the U.S. state of Michigan. The population was 9,985 at the 2020 census. The city's population has been falling for decades. It is almost 3/4 African American. Incorporated January 2, 1891, the area was part of a lumber producing region and later foundries.

== History ==
The city had sawmills. In 1938 a five-page "Chronological History of the City of Muskegon Heights” was published by the city.

In 2023, Bonnie McGlothin was elected mayor succeeding Walter Watt.

== Geography ==
The city is in southwestern Muskegon County, bordered to the north by Muskegon and to the south by the city of Norton Shores, with a small area of unincorporated Muskegon Township on the east side. The city of Roosevelt Park is a very short distance to the west. U.S. Route 31 runs along the western border of the city as Seaway Drive. The highway leads north into downtown Muskegon and south 31 miles (50 km) to Holland. Grand Rapids is 38 miles (61 km) to the southeast.

According to the U.S. Census Bureau, Muskegon Heights has a total area of 3.19 square miles (8.26 km^{2}), all land.

== Demographics ==
Historical population
Census	Pop.	Note	%±
1900	1,012		—
1910	1,690		67.0%
1920	9,514		463.0%
1930	15,584		63.8%
1940	16,047		3.0%
1950	18,828		17.3%
1960	19,552		3.8%
1970	17,304		−11.5%
1980	14,611		−15.6%
1990	13,176		−9.8%
2000	12,049		−8.6%
2010	10,856		−9.9%
2020	9,917		−8.6%
U.S. Decennial Census

=== Racial and ethnic composition ===
Muskegon Heights, Michigan – Racial and ethnic composition Note: the US Census treats Hispanic/Latino as an ethnic category. This table excludes Latinos from the racial categories and assigns them to a separate category. Hispanics/Latinos may be of any race.
Race / Ethnicity (NH = Non-Hispanic)	Pop 2000	Pop 2010	Pop 2020	% 2000	% 2010	% 2020
White alone (NH)	1,982	1,564	1,571	16.45%	14.41%	15.84%
Black or African American alone (NH)	9,315	8,434	7,238	77.31%	77.69%	72.99%
Native American or Alaska Native alone (NH)	47	29	41	0.39%	0.27%	0.41%
Asian alone (NH)	29	13	28	0.24%	0.12%	0.28%
Native Hawaiian or Pacific Islander alone (NH)	2	0	4	0.02%	0.00%	0.04%
Other race alone (NH)	14	11	23	0.12%	0.10%	0.23%
Mixed race or Multiracial (NH)	236	354	548	1.96%	3.26%	5.53%
Hispanic or Latino (any race)	424	451	464	3.52%	4.15%	4.68%
Total	12,049	10,856	9,917	100.00%	100.00%	100.00%

=== 2020 census ===
As of the 2020 census, Muskegon Heights had a population of 9,917. The median age was 34.5 years. 29.5% of residents were under the age of 18 and 12.6% of residents were 65 years of age or older. For every 100 females there were 89.8 males, and for every 100 females age 18 and over there were 83.9 males age 18 and over.

100.0% of residents lived in urban areas, while 0.0% lived in rural areas.

There were 3,842 households in Muskegon Heights, of which 37.6% had children under the age of 18 living in them. Of all households, 18.5% were married-couple households, 25.4% were households with a male householder and no spouse or partner present, and 47.4% were households with a female householder and no spouse or partner present. About 30.4% of all households were made up of individuals and 10.6% had someone living alone who was 65 years of age or older.

There were 4,534 housing units, of which 15.3% were vacant. The homeowner vacancy rate was 3.3% and the rental vacancy rate was 10.4%.

=== 2010 census ===
As of the census of 2010, there were 10,856 people, 3,996 households, and 2,682 families living in the city. The population density was 3,403.1 inhabitants per square mile (1,313.9/km^{2}). There were 4,842 housing units at an average density of 1,517.9 per square mile (586.1/km^{2}). The racial makeup of the city was 16.0% White, 78.3% African American, 0.3% Native American, 0.1% Asian, 1.4% from other races, and 3.8% from two or more races. Hispanic or Latino residents of any race were 4.2% of the population.

There were 3,996 households, of which 42.2% had children under the age of 18 living with them, 20.2% were married couples living together, 40.0% had a female householder with no husband present, 7.0% had a male householder with no wife present, and 32.9% were non-families. 28.4% of all households were made up of individuals, and 8.2% had someone living alone who was 65 years of age or older. The average household size was 2.66 and the average family size was 3.23.

The median age in the city was 30.3 years. 32.3% of residents were under the age of 18; 10.3% were between the ages of 18 and 24; 25.4% were from 25 to 44; 22.6% were from 45 to 64; and 9.6% were 65 years of age or older. The gender makeup of the city was 46.3% male and 53.7% female.

=== 2000 census ===
As of the census of 2000, there were 12,049 people, 4,507 households, and 2,970 families living in the city. The population density was 3,804.2 inhabitants per square mile (1,468.8/km^{2}). There were 5,108 housing units at an average density of 1,612.7/sq. mi. (622.1/km^{2}). The racial makeup of the city was 17.69% White, 77.77% African American, 0.45% Native American, 0.25% Asian, 0.02% Pacific Islander, 1.63% from other races, and 2.19% from two or more races. Hispanic or Latino of any race were 3.52% of the population.

There were 4,507 households, out of which 36.9% had children under the age of 18 living with them, 25.0% were married couples living together, 35.2% had a female householder with no husband present, and 34.1% were non-families. 28.8% of all households were made up of individuals, and 9.7% had someone living alone who was 65 years of age or older. The average household size was 2.66 and the average family size was 3.28.

In the city, 35.2% were under the age of 18, 9.3% from 18 to 24, 27.0% from 25 to 44, 17.8% from 45 to 64, and 10.6% were 65 years of age or older. The median age was 29 years. For every 100 females, there were 82.6 males. For every 100 females age 18 and over, there were 74.5 males.

The median income for a household in the city was $21,778, and the median income for a family was $26,144. Males had a median income of $30,027 versus $22,768 for females. The per capita income for the city was $12,456. About 25.7% of families and 29.6% of the population were below the poverty line, including 41.8% of those under age 18 and 17.0% of those age 65 or over.
