= Michigan Library Association =

Professional association for librarians in Michigan

Coordinates: 42°41′08″N 84°32′03″W

The Michigan Library Association is a United States professional association headquartered in Lansing, Michigan that advocates for libraries in Michigan on behalf of the state's residents. Founded in 1891, its members are more than 2,700 individuals and organizations from public, school, academic, cooperative, private and special libraries.

With a mission to lead the advancement of all Michigan libraries through advocacy, professional development, and engagement, the Michigan Library Association (MLA) is Michigan's oldest and largest library association and has advocated for libraries on behalf of the state's residents for more than 130 years.

MLA has influenced the course of Michigan's libraries since its inception in 1891, when Mary A. Eddy, the librarian at Coldwater Free Public Library, wrote to Henry Utley of the Detroit Public Library about organizing a state library association. They had discussed this matter at the 1890 meeting of the American Library Association in New Hampshire, believing a state association would be helpful to Michigan librarians unable to attend national conferences. Working closely with Lucy Ball, Grand Rapids Public Library, they awakened statewide interest and arranged the first Michigan meeting in Detroit, September 1, 1891. Thirty-seven members attended, elected a slate of five officers and printed their original 40-line constitution on a 3-inch by 6-inch card. Mr. Utley became the association's first president.

== Activities ==
=== Conferences and events ===
MLA sponsors an annual statewide conference each fall, rotating between locations in Michigan. This professional development and networking event draws hundreds of Michigan library staff yearly. A Spring Institute for Youth Services is held each spring.

=== Programs ===
MLA sponsors mentor programs, webinars, and scholarship programs, and the annual Michigan Library Appreciation Month.

=== Awards ===
The Michigan Library Awards are library and literary awards presented annually. They are awarded jointly with Michigan Association for Media in Education (MAME), the Michigan Academic Library Association (MiALA), the Library of Michigan and the Library of Michigan Foundation.

The Michigan Library Awards presentation is held annually during the fall Annual Conference of the Michigan Library Association.

Awards include:

- Michigan Author Award
- Rising Star Award
- Heart of a Champion Award
- Public Librarian of the Year Award
- Lifetime Achievement Award
- Frances H. Pletz Award for Excellence in Service to Youth
- Intellectual Freedom Award

== Publication ==
From 2002 to 2009, the association published the MLA Forum ISSN 1539-4123, an open access electronic peer-reviewed academic journal covering library and information science published by the Michigan Library Association. It was indexed by Library Literature and Library and Information Science Abstracts. The journal was initially published on a quarterly schedule. In 2008, it switched to an annual publication format. The successive editors-in-chief were Lothar Spang (Wayne State University, 2002–2005), Susann deVries (Eastern Michigan University, 2005–2007), and Michael Lorenzen (Central Michigan University, 2007–2009).

== Current and past presidents ==
The following persons have been president of the association:

- President Elect 2027-28, Michele Howard, Traverse Area District Library
- 2026-27, Lisa Waskin, Superior District Library
- 2025-26, Jenny Marr, Capital Area District Library
- 2023-25, Dillon Geshel, Superiorland Library Cooperative
- 2022-23, Scott Duimstra, Capital Area District Library
- 2021-22, Ryan Wieber, Kalamazoo Public Library
- 2021-21, Kelly Richards, Muskegon Area District Library
- 2020-21, Jennifer Dean, University of Detroit Mercy Libraries
- 2018-20, Kristin Shelley, East Lansing Public Library
- 2017-18, Steven Bowers, Detroit Area Library Network (DALNET)
- 2016-17, Kathleen Zaenger, Howell Carnegie District Library
- 2015-16, Leslie Warren, Northern Michigan University, Olson Library
- 2014-15, Asante Cain, Grand Rapids Public Library
- 2013-14, Cathy Wolford, Detroit Area Library Network
- 2012-13, Lance Werner, Kent District Library
- 2011-12, Richard Cochran, Central Michigan University
- 2010-11, Christine Berro, Portage District Library
- 2009-10, Larry Neal, Clinton-Macomb Public Library
- 2008-09, Kathy Irwin, Mardigian Library - University of Michigan-Dearborn
- 2007-08, Josie Parker, Ann Arbor District Library
- 2006-07, Leah Black, Michigan State University
- 2005-06, Michael McGuire, Traverse Area District Library
- 2004-05, Linda Farynk, Saginaw Valley State University
- 2003-04, Marcia Warner, Public Libraries of Saginaw
- 2002-03, Phyllis Jose, Oakland County Reference Library
- 2001-02, Elaine Didier, Oakland University Library
- 2000-01, Tom Genson, Grand Rapids Public Library
- 1999-2000, Denise Forro, Michigan State University
- 1998-99, Nancy Bujold, Rochester Hills Public Library
- 1997-98, Pamela Grudzien, Central Michigan University
- 1996-97, Beverly Papai, Farmington Community Library
- 1995-96, Martha Stilwell, Kellogg Community College-Battle Creek
- 1994-95, Sandra A. Scherba, Cromaine Library, Hartland
- 1993-94, Sandra Yee, Eastern Michigan University
- 1992-93, Francis J. Buckley,
- 1991-92, Jean Houghton, Saginaw Valley State University
- 1990-91, Jule Fosbender, Adrian Public Library
- 1989-90, Linda Heemstra, Bay County Library System, Bay City
- 1988-89, Colleen Hyslop, Michigan State University Libraries
- 1987-88, Clara N.Bohrer, Farmington Community Library
- 1986-87, Margaret Auer, University of Detroit Library
- 1985-86, A. Micheal Deller, Madison Heights/Livonia Public Libraries
- 1984-85, Robert Garen, Detroit Public Library
- 1983-84, Eleanor Pinkham, Kalamazoo College Library
- 1982-83, Margaret Thomas, Farmington Community Library
- 1981-82, Patricia Wilson, Rochester Hills (Avon Township) Public Library, Rochester
- 1980-81, Howard Lipton, St. Clair Shores
- 1979-80, Carolyn McMillen, Michigan State University Libraries
- 1978-79, Robert Raz, Grand Rapids Public Library
- 1977-78, Joan Wilcox, Oakland County Library Board, Pontiac
- 1976-77, Robert Gaylor, Kresge Library, Oakland University, Rochester
- 1975-76, Roberta Cheney, Powell Branch, Kalamazoo Public Library
- 1974-75, Bernard Oppeneer, Saginaw Public Library
- 1973-74, Mark Crum, Kalamazoo Public Library
- 1972-73, Mary Daume, Monroe County Library System
- 1971-72, Benard C. Rink, Northwestern Michigan College, Petoskey
- 1970-71, Mildred M. Winslow, Western Michigan University
- 1969-70, Robert E. Booth, Wayne State University
- 1968-69, James Sterling, Warren Public Library
- 1967-68, W. J. Kimbrough, Lansing Public Library
- 1966-67, Richard Chapin, Michigan State University Libraries
- 1965-66, Mary Mitchell, Detroit Public Library
- 1964-65, H. G. Johnston, Flint Public Library
- 1963-64, Madalyn M. Bradford, Webster Memorial Library, Decatur
- 1962-63, G. Flint Purdy, Wayne State University Library
- 1961-62, Ransom L Richardson, Flint Public Library
- 1960-61, Robert W. Armstrong, Detroit Public Library
- 1959-60, Frederick H. Wagman, University of Michigan Library
- 1958-59, Katharine Harris, Detroit Public Library
- 1957-58, Clifford B. Wightman, Hackley Public Library, Muskegon
- 1956-57, Clover Flanders, University of Michigan Extension Service
- 1955-56, William Chait, Kalamazoo Public Library
- 1954-55, Ethel Walker Yarbroff, Detroit School Librarian (retired)
- 1953-54, Ruth Warncke, Kent County Library
- 1952-53, Frances E. Burnside, Jackson Public Library
- 1951-52, Robert M. Orr, Grosse Pointe Public Library
- 1950-51, Marian C. Young, Detroit Public Library
- 1949-50, Alta Parks, Mason Public Library, Ingham County
- 1948-49, Alice Louise LeFevre, Western Michigan College, Department of Education
- 1947-48, Hobart R. Coffey, University of Michigan, Law Library
- 1946-47, Donald W. Kohlsedt, Grand Rapids Public Library
- 1945-46, Adeline Cooke, Baldwin Public Library, Birmingham
- 1944-45, Ernest I. Miller, Detroit Public Library
- 1943-44, Cecil J. Mettale, University of Michigan, Department of Library Science
- 1942-43, Eudocia Stratton, Central Michigan College of Education Library, Mt. Pleasant
- 1941-42, Irene C. Hayner, University High School, Ann Arbor
- 1940-41, Dorothy T. Hagerman, West Side Branch, Grand Rapids Public Library
- 1939-40, Frances A. Hannum, Ann Arbor Public Library
- 1938-39, Ruth Rutzen, Detroit Public Library
- 1937-38, Ralph A. Ulveling, Detroit Public Library
- 1936-37, Maude E. Grill, Jackson County Library
- 1935-36, Samuel W. McAllister, University of Michigan Library
- 1934-35, Loleta D. Fyan, Wayne County Library, Detroit
- 1933-34, C. Tefft Hewitt, Hackley Public Library, Muskegon
- 1932-33, Nancy B. Thomas, Baldwin Public Library, Birmingham
- 1931-32, C. B. Joeckel, University of Michigan Library School
- 1929-30, Elisabeth Knapp, Detroit Public Library
- 1928-29, William Webb, Flint Public Library
- 1927-28, William Bishop, University of Michigan Library
- 1926-27, Gail Curtis, State Library, Lansing
- 1925-26, Louis Bailey, Flint Public library
- 1924-25, Harold L. Wheeler, Hackley Public Library
- 1923-24, Constance Bement, State Library, Lansing
- 1922-23, Flora B. Roberts, Kalamazoo Public Library
- 1921-22, Alma A. Olson, Detroit Public Library
- 1920-21, Annie Pollard, Grand Rapids Public Library
- 1919-20, Adam Strohm, Detroit Public Library
- 1918-19, Francis L. D. Goodrich, University of Michigan Library
- 1917-18, Kathryn G. Sleneau, McGregor Public Library, Highland Park
- 1915-16, John S. Cleavinger, Jackson Public Library
- 1913-14, Theodore W. Koch, University of Michigan Library
- 1912-13, Annie F MacDonell, Bay City Public Library
- 1910-11, Nina K. Preston, University of Michigan Library
- 1908-09, G. M. Walton, State Normal College Library, Ypsilanti
- 1906-07, Samuel Ranck, Grand Rapids Public Library
- 1891-1905, H. M. Utley, Detroit Public Library

== See also ==
- List of libraries in the United States
