= Elaine Didier =

American director of the Gerald R. Ford Library and Museum

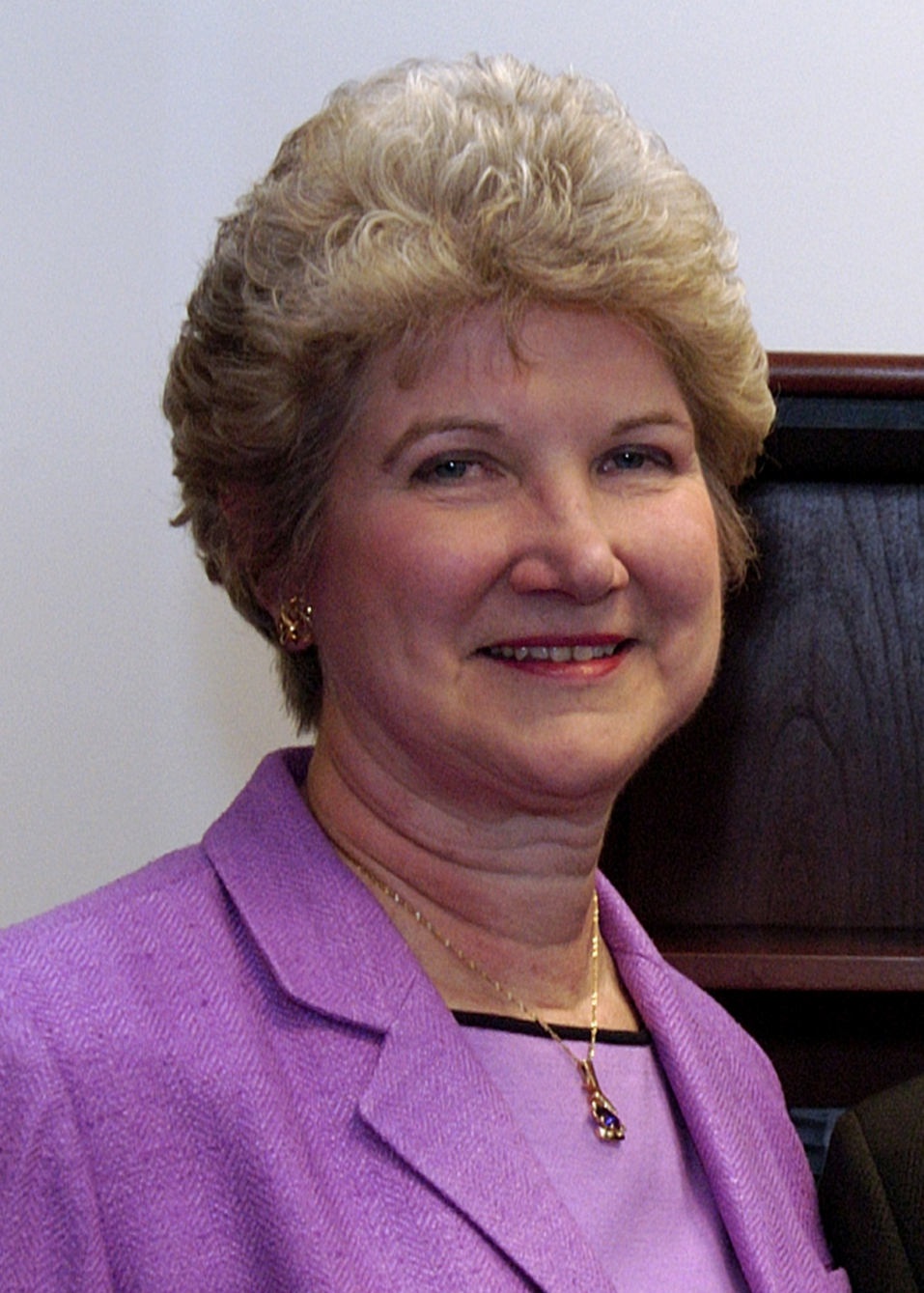
- Born: Elaine Karin Macklin; January 1, 1948 (age 78); Michigan, U.S.
- Education: University of Michigan (BA, AMLS, PhD)
- Occupations: Director, Gerald R. Ford Presidential Library and Museum
- Years active: 1977–present
- Employers: University of Michigan (1977–1999); Oakland University (1999–2005); Gerald R. Ford Presidential Library and Museum (2005–present)
- Spouse(s): Gordon W. Didier, attorney
- Awards: University of Michigan Distinguished Alumni Award (2010); Rotary Club Distinguished Service Award (2012)
- Website: fordlibrarymuseum.gov/library/library-staff.asp

Elaine Didier (/ˈdiːdi.eɪ/ DEE-dee-ay; born 1948) is the director of the Gerald R. Ford Presidential Library and Museum in Michigan, United States. Didier worked at the University of Michigan from 1977 to 1999, where she earned her Doctorate (PhD) in 1982. She was appointed as a board member in October 1997 at Compuware, a Detroit, Michigan based software company with products aimed at the information technology departments of large businesses. In July 1999, Didier left the University of Michigan to become dean of Kresge Library at Oakland University. Didier became director of the Ford Presidential Library and Museum in January 2005. Didier led efforts to increase attendance to the museum. For her accomplishments, she received the University of Michigan Distinguished Alumni Award and the Rotary Club Distinguished Service Award.

== Early life ==
When she was 18, Didier enrolled at the University of Michigan, where she met Gordon Didier, an economics student in 1969. After dating only three weeks, Didier and Gordon were involved in a rollover of an MGB sports car in which Didier suffered a broken vertebra.

In 1969, Didier earned a Bachelor of Arts (BA) (Honors English) degree in Library Science. She completed her Master of Arts in Library Science (AMLS) at the University of Michigan in 1971, which is the same year she married Gordon. Didier earned a Doctorate (PhD) degree at the University of Michigan in 1982, and studied at Oxford University.

== Career ==
Didier began working at the University of Michigan in 1977, and held a variety of positions there over the next 22 years, including: director of information resources at the School of Business Administration, director of the Microcomputer Education Center, assistant director of the University Computer Center, director and assistant director of instructional strategy services, visiting assistant professor in the schools of Education and Information, and library media consultant to the Bureau of School Services.

In 1987, Didier was elected president of the Association for Educational Communications and Technology, an academic and professional association dedicated to improving education through technology. At Michigan's Business School Library in the early 1990s, Didier promoted experimentation with full-text digital archives as a substitute to paper business journals in anticipation of future delivery of electronic information.

In 1993, Didier was the first woman elected president of the Ann Arbor Rotary Club, a branch of the international service club whose stated purpose is to bring together business and professional leaders in order to provide humanitarian services, encourage high ethical standards in all vocations, and help build goodwill and peace in the world. In the fall of 1993, Didier resigned her position as director of information resources in the Kresge Business Administration Library to become associate dean of the Horace H. Rackham School of Graduate Studies. As associate dean, Didier oversaw a US$29 million budget and 55-member staff. In 1994, Didier served as a first-time regional chair of the University of Michigan's United Way Campaign after being involved in the campaign for years.

In 1996, Didier became an adjunct associate professor in the University of Michigan School of Information and director of Residential and Research University Programs, Academic Outreach, an extended learning program of the University of Michigan's libraries that offered online distant learning to people worldwide. In her position as director of Residential and Research University Programs, Didier oversaw expansion of the library information systems, spring/summer programs, and the university's distance education programs, including its intellectual property guidelines. In November 1997, Provost Nancy Cantor appointed Didier as interim director of the entire Academic Outreach program. A few months prior, the Michigan Women's Foundation and Crain's Detroit Business added Didier to a database that helped companies find qualified women for their boards of directors. That led to Didier's October 1997 appointment as a board member of Compuware, a Detroit, Michigan based software company with products aimed at the information technology departments of large businesses. At the time, Compuware had more than US$800 million in sales and earned nearly US$100 million in 1997. Didier's work with the University of Michigan's library information systems gave her a unique perspective that "added to Compuware's technology-focused board."

In November 1998, Didier was elected as the 1998–99 vice chair of the Midwest Universities Consortium for International Activities, a Midwestern United States consortium of 10 Big Ten public research universities that collaborates on large-scale projects in developing countries. In addition, the University Continuing Education Association in Washington D.C. appointed Didier that same month to a three-year term on the Learning and Technologies Commission, then one of three national commissions guiding the future directions of providing continuous open and distance education learning opportunities in the United States for adults and non-traditional students.

=== Beyond the University of Michigan ===
In July 1999, Didier left the University of Michigan to become dean of Kresge Library at Oakland University, a public university co-founded by Matilda Dodge Wilson and John A. Hannah whose 1,500-acre (6.1 km^{2}) campus is located in central Oakland County, Michigan. In March 2000, Didier was appointed to Oakland University's Information Technology Strategic Planning Task Force, where she developed plans for the university's new Information Technology Institute. About a year later, Didier was elected president of the Michigan Library Association, a United States professional association headquartered in Lansing, Michigan that advocates for libraries in Michigan on behalf of the state's residents. As the representative of the Michigan Library Association, Didier was appointed to the board of trustees of the Library of Michigan, Michigan's official state library agency that additionally serves as a historical center. Didier's position as president of the Michigan Library Association expired in 2005.

In 2003, Didier was elected chair of the Library of Michigan Board of Trustees. In her capacity as chair of the Library of Michigan board, Didier also served as a member of the Library of Michigan Foundation board of directors. In 2004, Didier was elected to the board of directors of the Association of College and Research Libraries, a division of the American Library Association that serves as a professional association of academic librarians and other interested individuals. In September 2004, Didier was one of three finalists seeking the position of director of the Grand Rapids Public Library system. However, Didier withdrew before the interviews for the public library position after learning that the position of director of the Gerald R. Ford Presidential Library and Museum was available due to the retirement of former director Dennis Daellenbach. Four months later, Didier was named as the director of the Gerald R. Ford Presidential Library and Museum. On the first day of her job, U.S. President Gerald Ford told Didier that, "I stand ready to assist you in any way," for which Didier thanked him and asked about the museum's collection of footballs signed by former Ohio State coach Woody Hayes.

=== At the Gerald R. Ford Presidential Library and Museum ===
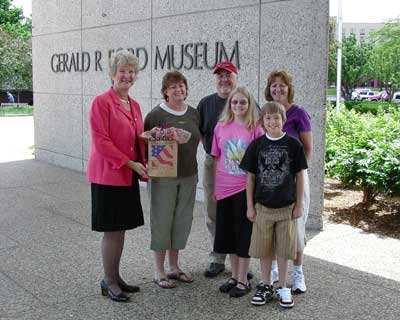
Didier at the Museum on June 17, 2008, with the three millionth visitor, Cindy Lund. Cindy Lund (in green) was given an autographed copy of President Ford's autobiography.

The Gerald R. Ford Presidential Library and Museum opened to the public in September 1981. It houses documents, audio-visual materials, and artifacts on the life, career, and presidency of Gerald Ford, the 38th President of the United States. When archivist John W. Carlin selected Didier as director in January 2005, President Ford announced,

"I am tremendously pleased by the archivist's decision to name Elaine Didier as the new Library Director. She has the energy, experience, and enthusiasm to sustain and enhance the progress that's been made at the Library and Museum. I am particularly pleased by her interest in partnering with civic leaders and the academic and business communities in Ann Arbor, Grand Rapids and the region to provide new opportunities for educational programming."

In singling out Didier's ideas on how to use online technology to expand educational outreach efforts at the library and museum as a main reason for the appointment, the Archivist of the United States noted that Didier was someone with a "wealth of experience as a leader in higher education in Michigan and as an executive leader facilitating outreach and alliances in support of learning programs." At the time, Didier wanted to raise the museum's profile, facilitate distance learning and research, and display museum exhibits at the library and make available library resources at the museum, given that the museum and library are located approximately 130 miles (210 km) apart.

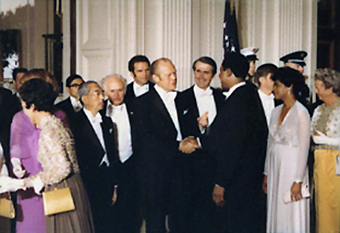
Image of President Ford in black tuxedo welcoming U.S. baseball player Hank Aaron to the White House on October 2, 1975, used in the Ford complex's 2005 "Play Ball Mr. President!" exhibit.

In May 2005, Didier had 4-foot (1.2-meter), blue neon letters installed on the museum to make the museum more visible across the Grand River running next to the museum. Although the sign was about 12 times larger than allowed by the city's zoning ordinance, the museum was exempt from local zoning ordinances as a federal governmental installation. A few months later, Didier oversaw "Play Ball Mr. President!," an exhibit at the museum that celebrated ties between U.S. presidents and baseball through a display of more than 75 photographs of presidents playing or otherwise participating in the game. She noted that the exhibit was conceived in connection with an upcoming 2005 Major League Baseball All-Star Game at Comerica Park in Detroit. One photo unearthed from the archives showed President Ford in black tuxedo welcoming U.S. baseball player Hank Aaron to the White House during an October 2, 1975 state dinner for Emperor Hirohito of Japan.

In October 2005, Didier spoke at Northwood University about the purpose and functions of presidential libraries and the future of the Ford museum and library complex. In February 2006, Grand Valley State University Didier delivered the keynote address at an event that honored the accomplishments of local women.

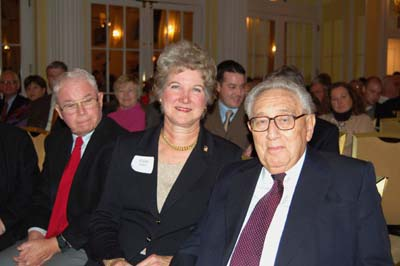
Didier with former Secretary of State Henry Kissinger prior to Kissinger's October 24, 2006 talk at the library

In the years 2001 to 2004, just before Didier took over as director at the Ford Presidential Library and Museum, the complex experienced a significant drop in attendance, largely as a result of a 2001 to 2003 remodel. In a 2006 article, Didier addressed the prior 2001 to 2004 low attendance issue and noted it additionally was a result of the struggling local Michigan economy, where people had less money for discretionary spending. In particular, Didier identified tight local school budgets as accounting for the biggest "visit-killer," which Didier successfully addressed by getting Italian-American diplomat, businessman, and longtime friend of President Ford Peter Secchia to provide a US$300,000 grant that would cover the busing costs from 2006 to 2011 and allow schools to reinstate field trip programs to the Ford complex. In December 2006, President Gerald Ford died, and Didier commented on Ford's views of the complex, stating, "[Ford] wanted both the Library and the Museum to have vibrant educational programs, and he delighted in the thousands of archival research visits made by University of Michigan students and other scholars over the years." She also agreed with Ford's desire that the library and museum be living institutions rather than warehouses preserving documents and artifacts as monuments to Ford.

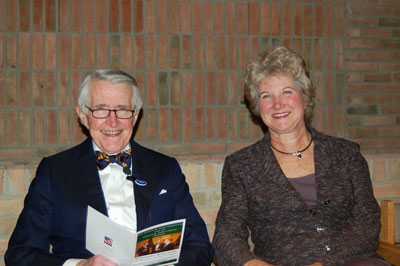
Didier at the Ford Library on March 21, 2006, with Henry Catto, an ambassador of the United States to a variety of countries

In 2007, Didier increased the number of public events at the library, including visits by Pulitzer Prize-winning journalist Charlie Savage, the Washington Post's Bob Woodward, former U.S. ambassador to Britain Henry Catto, former National Security Advisor Brent Scowcroft, and others in a series of lectures that resulted in increased reference requests at the library. In August 2007, Didier was appointed to a selection panel of judges to choose the official symbol of the 100th anniversary of the Boy Scouts of America. Two months later in October 2007, Didier was filmed in two-hour live broadcast on C-SPAN that featured the 21 million pages of documents and 500,000 audio-visual materials in Gerald Ford's library. In the C-SPAN series, entitled "Presidential Libraries: History Uncovered," Didier and supervisory archivist David Horrocks showed off special documents that have been used by researchers like Bob Woodward and artifacts such as Ford's Eagle Scout medal and the Profile in Courage Award he received at the Kennedy Library in 2001.

In October 2010, Didier received the University of Michigan Distinguished Alumni Award. The award, given to "alumni who have at least 25 years of professional service in the information professions and have made outstanding contributions," honored Didier for her role in introducing a broad agenda that expanded the programs and feature exhibits of the Gerald R. Ford Presidential Library and Museum as well as increased the visibility of the library and museum both locally and nationally. The university also highlighted her work to advance women in leadership roles by participating in organizations such as International Women's Forum and Michigan's Network for Women Leaders.

In October 2012, Didier received the Rotary Club's Distinguished Service Award, the club's highest award.

== Personal ==
Didier lives in Plymouth, Michigan, with her husband Gordon, an attorney at the Detroit-based Butzel Long law firm. Didier serves as Assistant Secretary and her husband Gordon serves as Treasurer at St. John's Episcopal Church in Downtown Detroit. Didier enjoys classical music, owns a Steinway B piano and a harpsichord, is an avid flower gardener, and has an affinity for all animals, especially her two cats, Whiskers and Jacques.

== Selected publications ==
- Didier, Elaine Karin Macklin (1982). Relationships between student achievement in reading and library media programs and personnel (PhD thesis). University of Michigan. OCLC 9054983.
- Didier, Elaine K. (November 2, 1984). Research on the impact of school library media programs on student achievement. Annual Meeting of the American Association of School Librarians (Atlanta, GA, November 2, 1984). Atlanta, Georgia: American Association of School Librarians. pp. 343–361. OCLC 17832958. ERIC ED279340.
- Didier, Elaine K. (October 25, 1986). Changing patterns of information storage and retrieval in American libraries and educational resource centers. EDUTEC '86, the All Japan Annual Education Technology Congress (12th, Tokyo, Japan, October 25–27, 1986). OCLC 760441322. ERIC ED279324.
- Didier, Elaine; Hall, Cathy W. (April 1987). "Acceptability and utilization of frequently-cited intervention strategies". Psychology in the Schools. 24 (2): 153–161. ERIC EJ355373.
- Didier, Elaine Karin Macklin; Battin, Patricia; Powell, James L. (1989). Financing the future, who will pay? (Cassette). Crofton, Maryland: Recorded Resources Corp. OCLC 21317425. EDUCOM 8938.
- Didier, Elaine Karin Macklin; Simon, Lou Anna Kimsey; Chapman, Art; Weissman, Ronald F. E. (1989). The University in the 1990s: Surviving the coming bear market in fantasies. EDUCOM '89 meeting held at the University of Michigan, Ann Arbor, Michigan, October, 1989 (Cassette recording). OCLC 21355532.
- Didier, Elaine K. (February 1990). "A synergistic approach to defining a new information environment". Academic Computing. 4 (5): 24–25, 38–41. OCLC 424958892. ERIC EJ408961.
- Didier, Elaine K.; Spalding, Helen H. (2001). "Didier and Spalding share plans for ACRL – Statements to help you decide how to vote this spring". College & Research Libraries News. Vol. 62, no. 2. Association of College and Research Libraries. p. 199. OCLC 95515756.

== Awards and recognitions ==
- 2010: University of Michigan Distinguished Alumni Award.
- 2012: Rotary Club Distinguished Service Award, the club's highest award.
