= Detroit Public Library =

Library system of Detroit, Michigan, US

Coordinates: 42°21′30.9″N 83°4′0″W

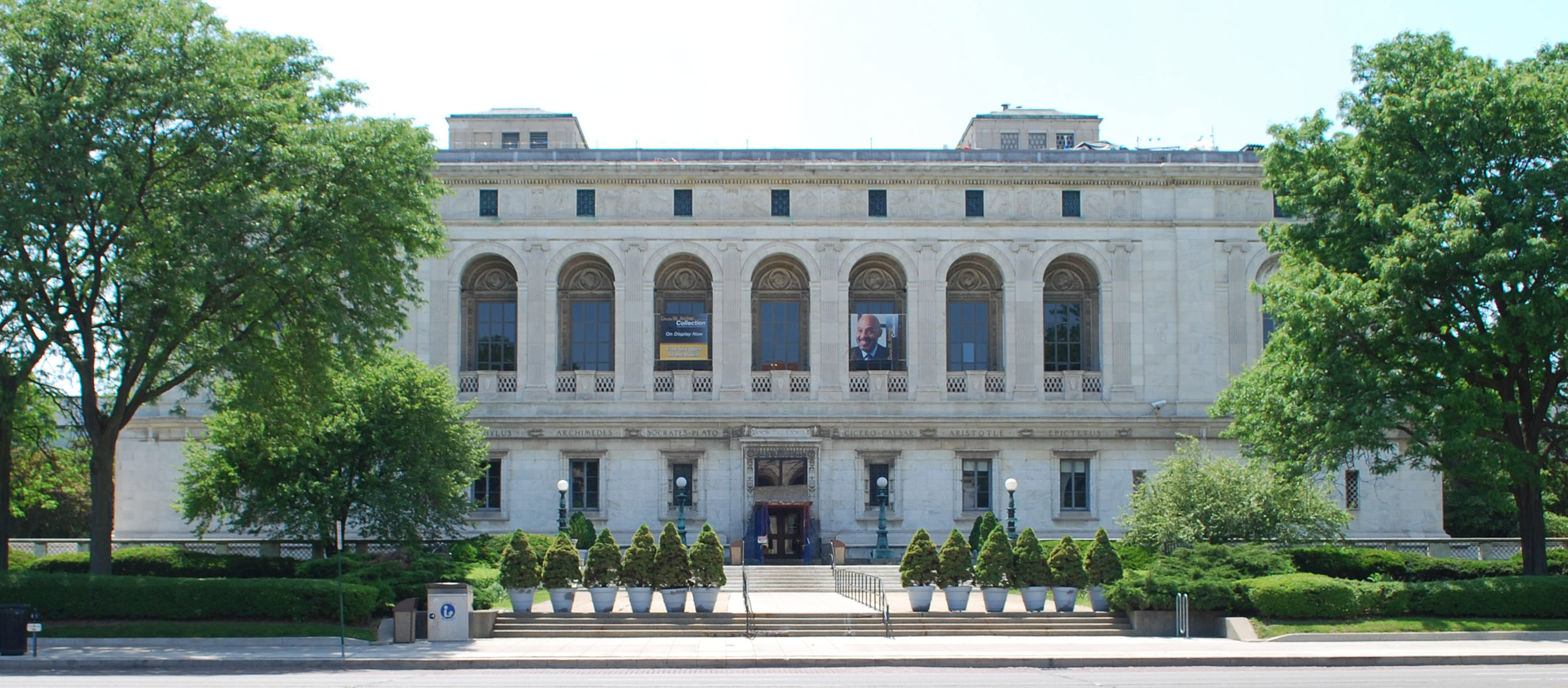
- Location: 5201 Woodward Avenue; Detroit, Michigan
- Established: 1865; 161 years ago
- Branches: 21

Collection
- Size: 7,572,562

Access and use
- Population served: 918,849

Other information
- Director: Jo Anne Mondowney
- Website: detroitpubliclibrary.org

The Detroit Public Library is the municipal public library system of the City of Detroit in Michigan, United States. It is the second largest library system in the U.S. state of Michigan by volumes held (after the University of Michigan Library) and the 12th-largest public library system in the United States.

The library system is composed of the Main Library on Woodward Avenue, which houses the library's administration offices, and 23 branch libraries across the city of Detroit. The Main Library, part of Detroit's Cultural Center Historic District listed on the National Register of Historic Places, sits adjacent to Wayne State University and across from the Detroit Institute of Arts.

Designed by Cass Gilbert, the Detroit Public Library was constructed with Vermont marble and serpentine Italian marble trim in an Italian Renaissance style. His son, Cass Gilbert Jr. was a partner with Francis Keally in the design of the library's additional wings added in 1963. Among his other buildings, Cass Gilbert designed the United States Supreme Court Building in Washington, D.C., the Minnesota State Capitol and the Woolworth Building in New York City.

== History ==
A stand-alone public library in Detroit dates back to 1865. An 1842 state law requiring the Detroit Board of Education to open a library resulted in a public reading room opening on March 25, 1865, in the old Capitol High School at State and Griswold Street. In 1872, the Centre Park Library opened across the street from the current location of the Skillman Branch in downtown Detroit at Gratiot and Library Street. The first branch library opened in 1897 when the Detroit Water Commission library was opened to the public; in 1905 this library was turned over to the Detroit Library Commission.

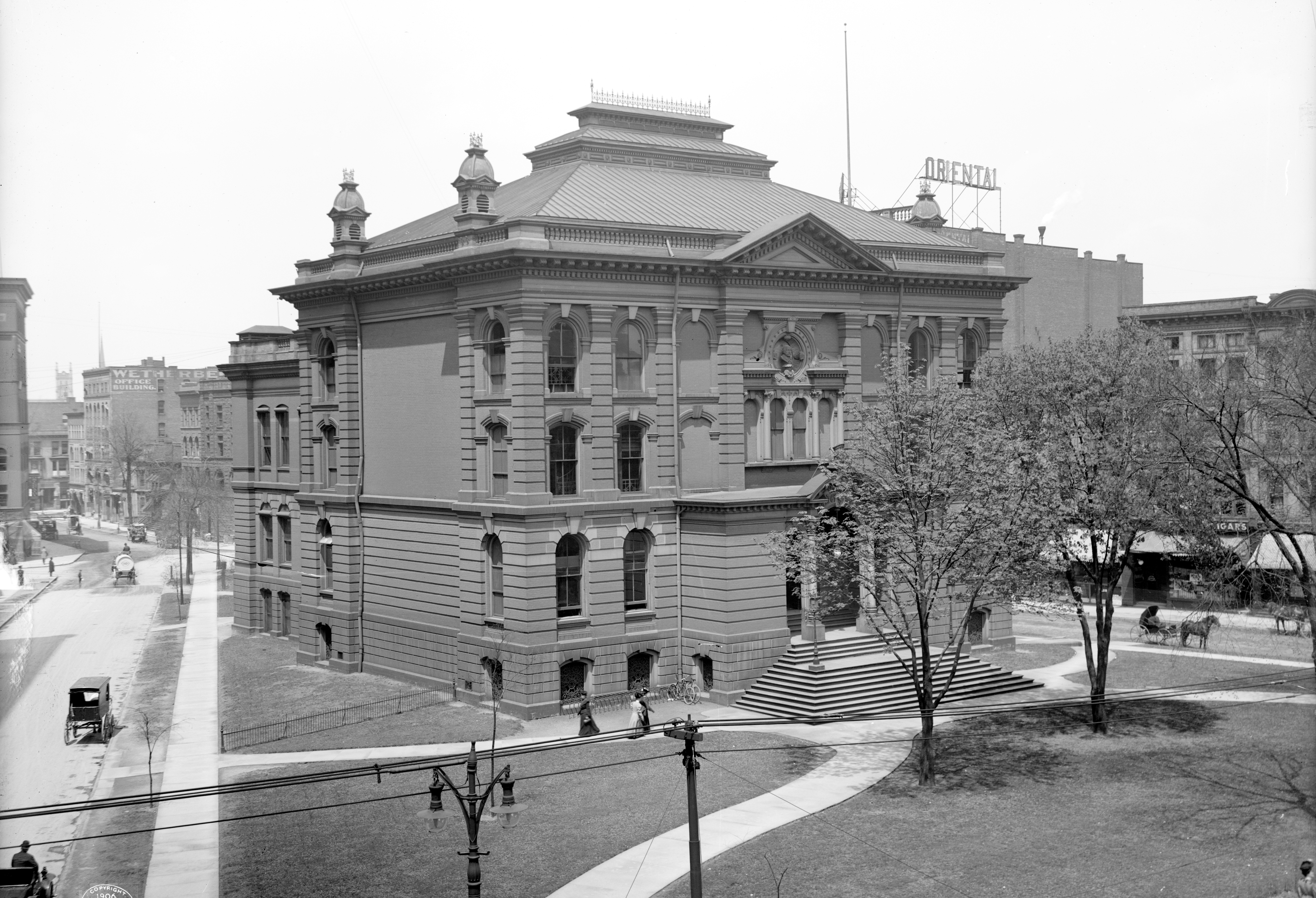
The first library building, constructed in 1872 at Centre Park

Several additional branches opened shortly afterwards, including one in the Old Main building of Wayne State University. But it was not until 1910 when Andrew Carnegie, the great American library philanthropist of the early 20th century, donated funds did Detroiters decide to build a larger central library to supplement Centre Park. Property near Woodward and Kirby was purchased and in 1912 Cass Gilbert was commissioned to construct his design of a three-floor, early Italian Renaissance-style building. Due to delays and World War I, the Main Library did not open until March 21, 1921. It was dedicated June 3, 1921. In 1937, the Detroit Public Library hired its first African-American librarian, Marjorie A. Blackistone; Blackistone worked throughout her career to expand the library's African-American literature collection. The library system's bookmobile service began in 1940.

Ralph Ulveling was Director from 1941 to 1967.

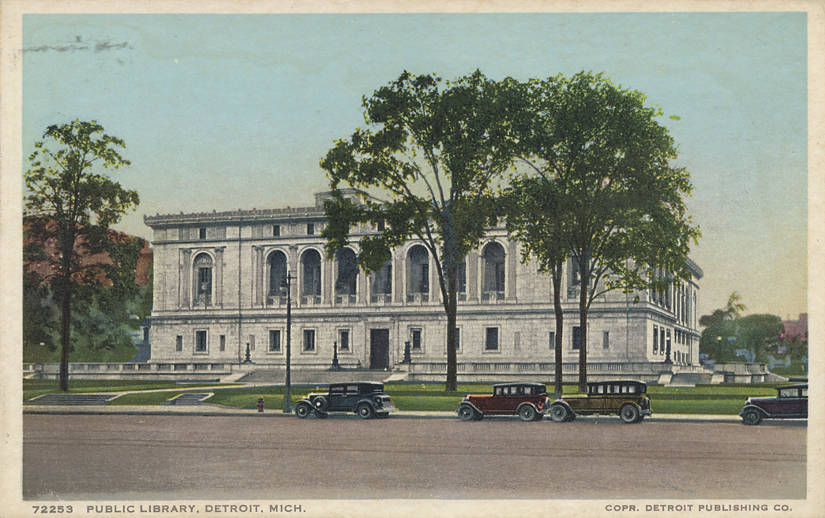
Detroit Public Library depicted on a postcard

After World War II, Detroit Public Library obtained "projected books" on microfilm and loaned these with portable projectors to disabled veterans (and other patrons with disabilities) who could press a switch under their chin more easily than turning a page.

The north and south wings opened on June 23, 1963, and added a significant amount of space to the building. The wings were connected along the rear of the original building and a new entrance created on Cass Avenue. Above this entrance is a mosaic by Millard Sheets entitled The River of Knowledge. As part of the addition, a triptych mural was added to the west wall of Adam Strohm Hall on the third floor. The mural by local artist John Stephens Coppin is entitled Man's Mobility and depicts a history of transportation. This mural complements a tryparch mural on the opposite wall completed in 1921 by Gari Melchers depicting Detroit's early history.

In 1970 Clara Stanton Jones became the first African American and the first woman to serve as director of a major library system in America, as director of the Detroit Public Library. The Clara Stanton Jones Friends Auditorium is named in her honor.

The Detroit Public Library is also a founding member of the Detroit Area Library Network. The network initially ran the Integrated Library System (online library catalog) for the library, but the library later purchased its own servers, after the mainframe computer era began to wane, and the library now runs its own systems. The library continues to be a member partner in the network consortium.

== Architecture ==
The Detroit Public Library Main Library building was designed by architect Cass Gilbert, who designed other important public buildings in America. It is typical of architectural styles that were prevalent at the beginning of the 20th century and were applied in constructing civic buildings. Such architecture emphasizes strength and formal design.

While planning the building, architect Cass Gilbert added a third floor to increase the area of the building due to the increasing volumes of activities carried out there. Thus, the building became adapted to changing circumstances and even provided an additional floor for keeping special collections, for example, the Burton Historical collection.

The main function of the building since its opening has been to serve as the heart of the Detroit Public Library system, which was used for reading and studying different topics.

== Administration ==
The Detroit Public Library is a publicly funded, independent, municipal corporation. The Detroit Public Library Commission, whose members are appointed by the Detroit Public Schools Board of Education, is the governing authority for the system. The commission establishes policies and administers funds. There are 7 Library Commissioners, with the seventh commissioner being the current president of the Board of Education, who is an ex-officio commissioner. Library Commissioners are appointed to 6 year staggered terms. There is an annual general meeting where the president, vice president, and secretary of the commission are elected, and monthly meetings held at the Main Library which are open to the public. The commission appoints and hires the Director and deputy director, while all other employees are hired by the commission, upon the recommendation of the Director.

On September 16, 2014, former chief administrative and technology officer Timothy Cromer was sentenced to 10 years in prison for his role in a $1.5 million kickback scheme.

== Collections ==
The Detroit Public Library offers users books, magazines, records, CDs, videos, DVDs, and electronic materials through access to subscription databases. The Detroit Public Library catalog can be viewed online. The Main Library houses the Burton Historical Collection (named for historian and donor Clarence M. Burton), the E. Azalia Hackley Collection (named for Emma Azalia Hackley), the Rare Book Collection, and the Ernie Harwell Sports Collection. Skillman Branch houses the National Automotive History Collection. Additionally, a selection of digitized materials are available in an online collection.

The library's collection grew enormously during the 20th century in accordance with the changing interest of the general public. Apart from literary works, scientific, historical, and practical material assumed a prominent position. The library circulation report for the early 20th century indicates an increasing trend in terms of borrower numbers as well as distribution of materials.

== Services ==
The library also offers practical advice to Detroiters through their TIP service, short for The Information Place. Librarians and support staff have access to a TIP database and offer free community information and referral service on matters such as food, housing, transportation, financial aid, legal advice, education, counseling, health care and family support. Library clients can search the TIP database themselves when visiting the library.

In addition to these services, the outreach programs offered by the Detroit Public Library have also sought to provide more people access to the information available there. Such programs include reading programs for kids, help to schools, as well as help for those who cannot physically visit the library. Programs for book delivery and collection of books for the visually impaired in braille are among other services available to more people.

== Gallery ==
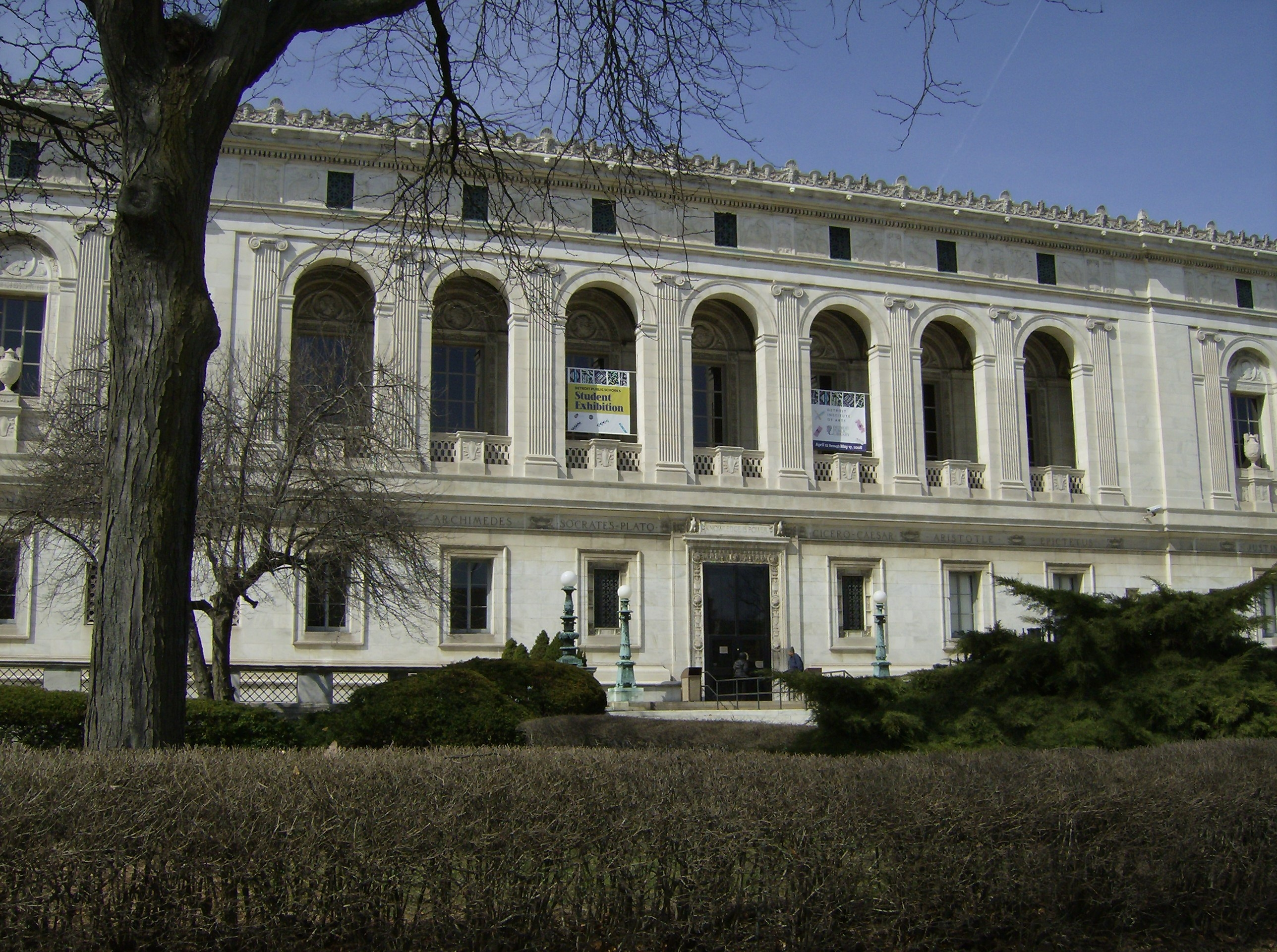
Main entrance of the Italian Renaissance-style building

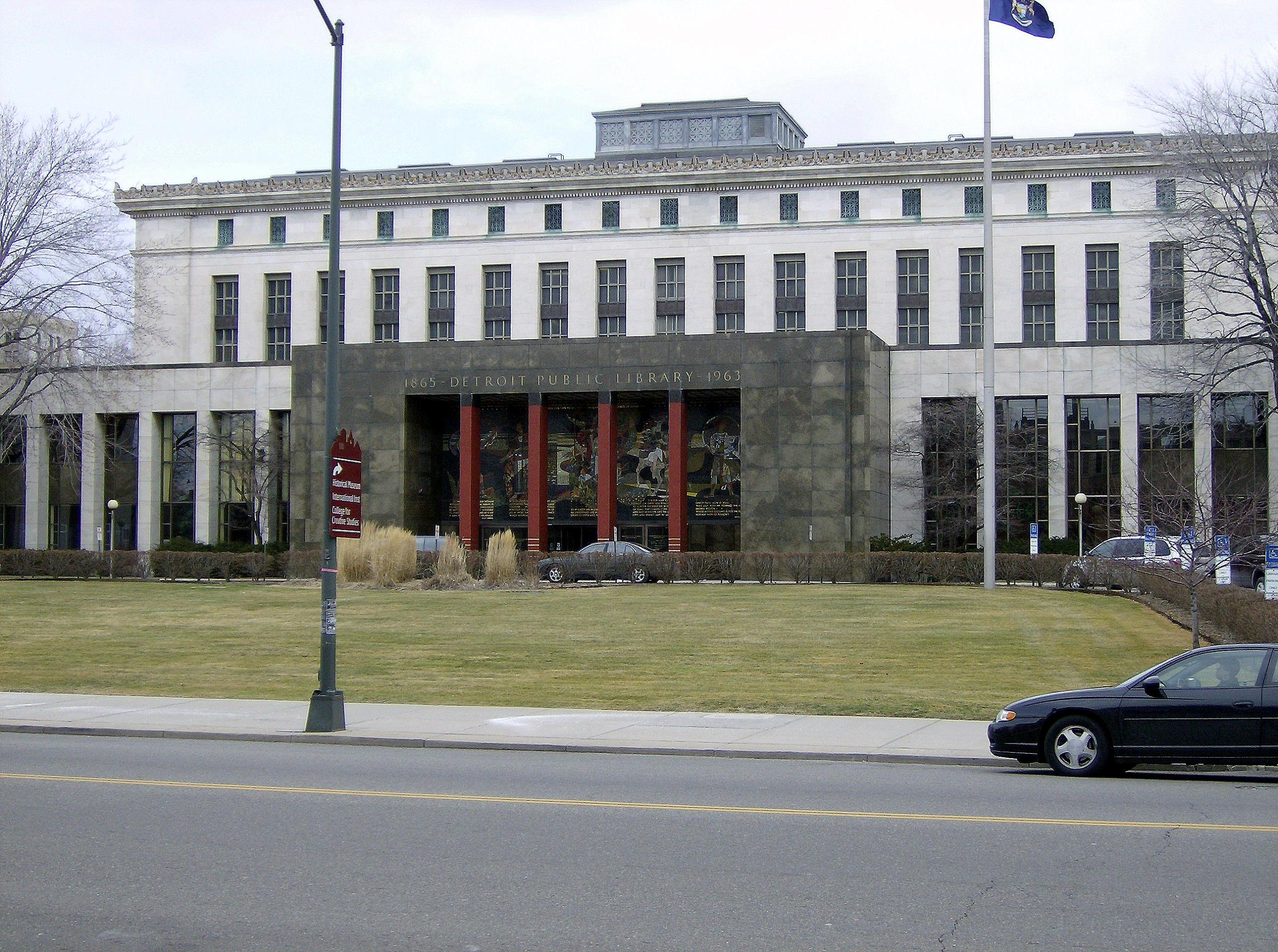
Detroit Public Library, Cass Avenue entrance

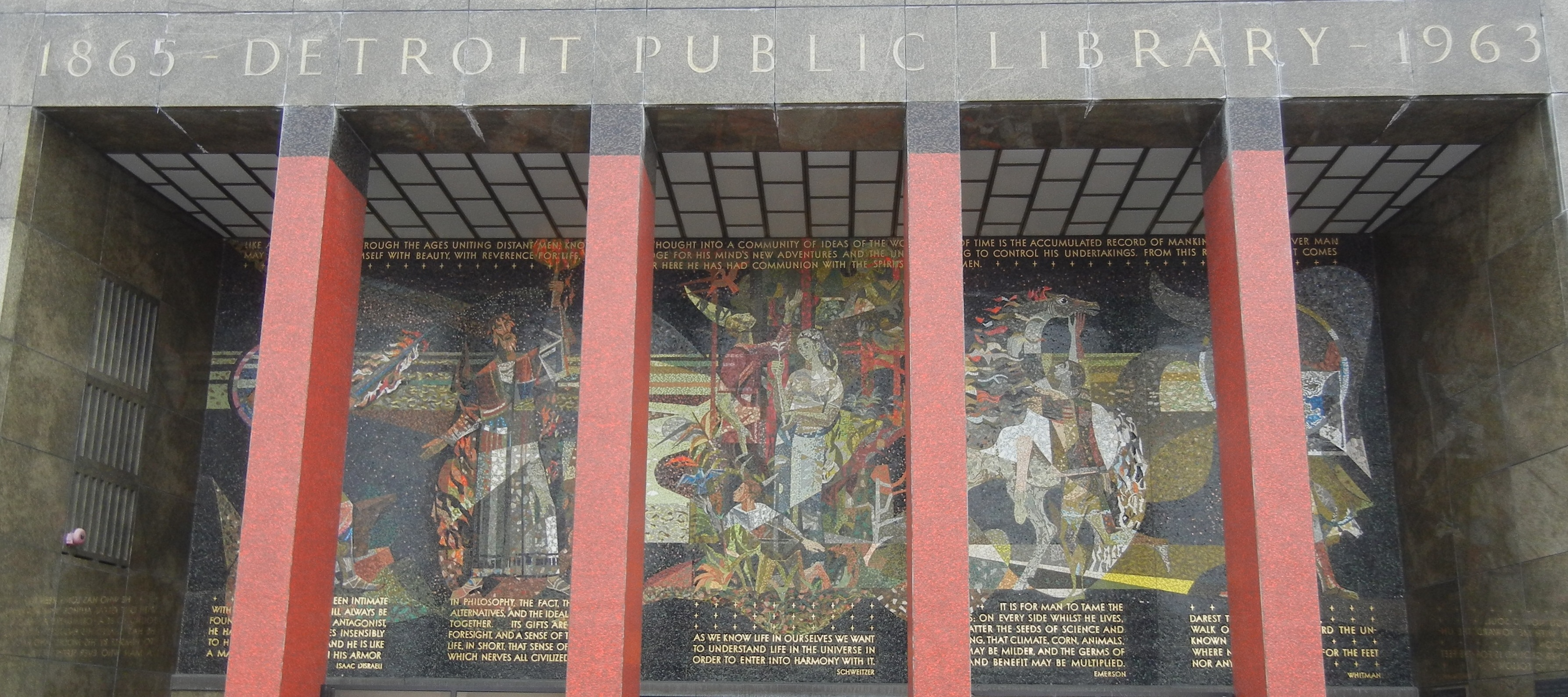
Detail of the Mosaic above the Cass Avenue entrance

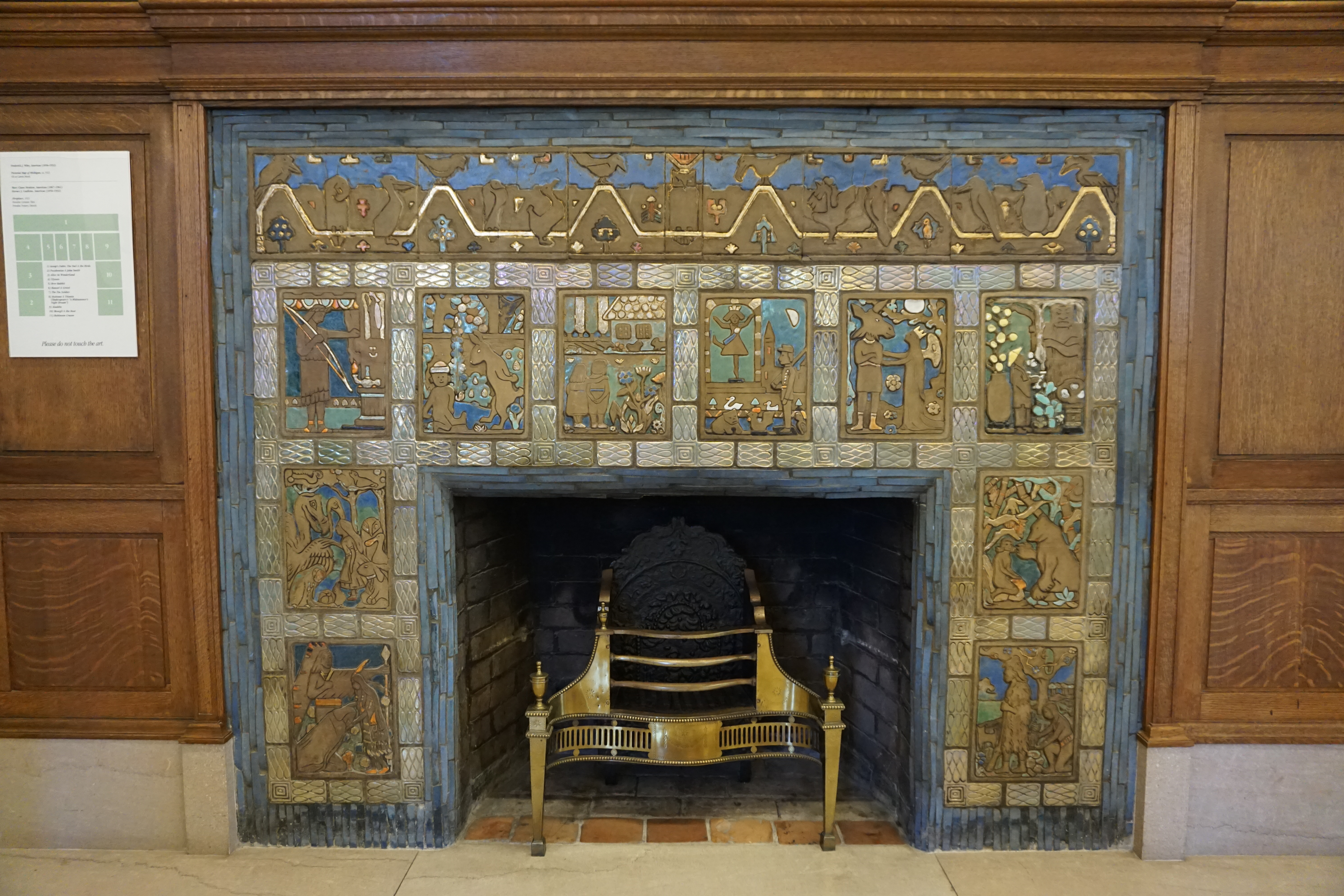
Pewabic fireplace in the HYPE Teen Center

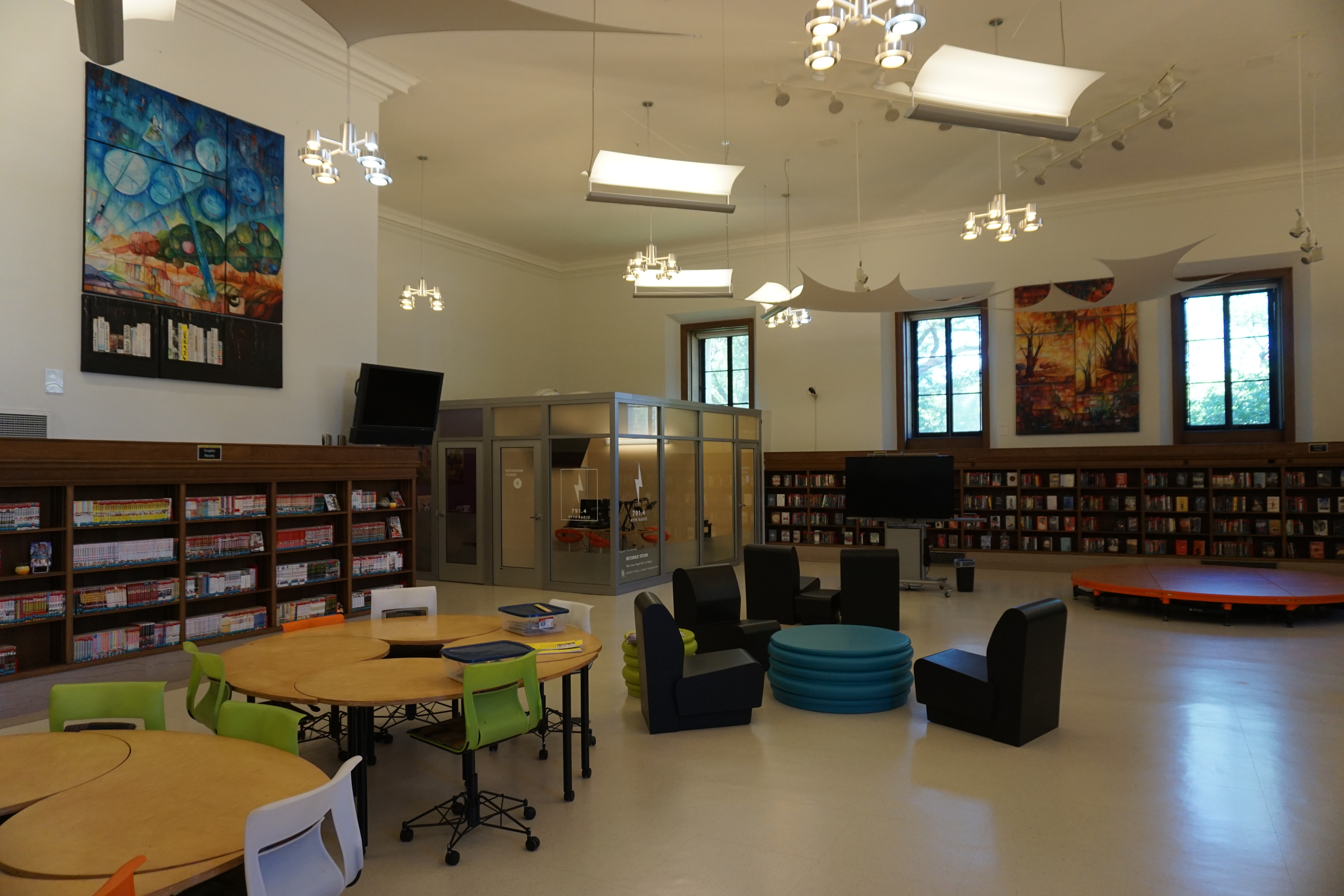
HYPE Teen Center

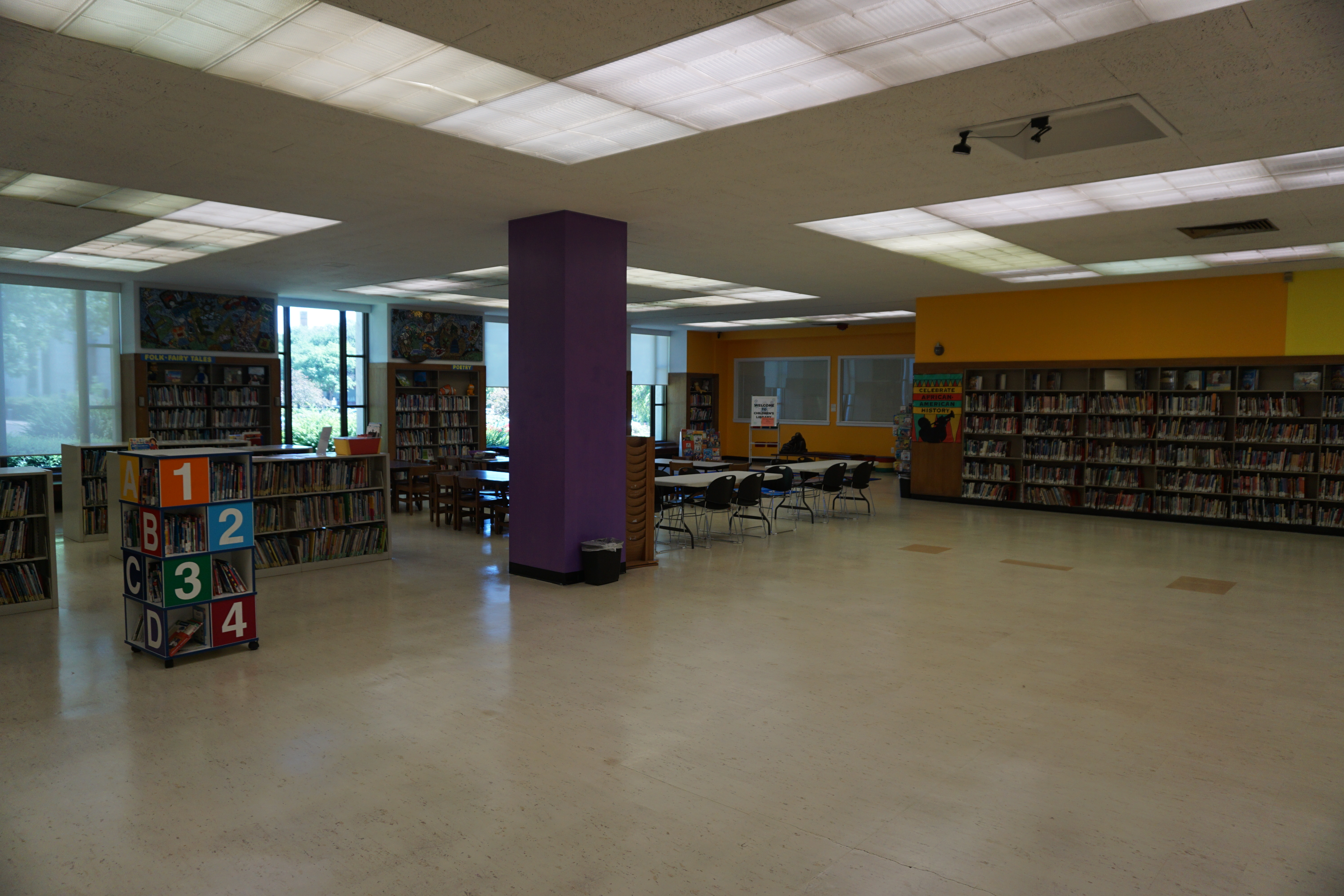
Children's Library

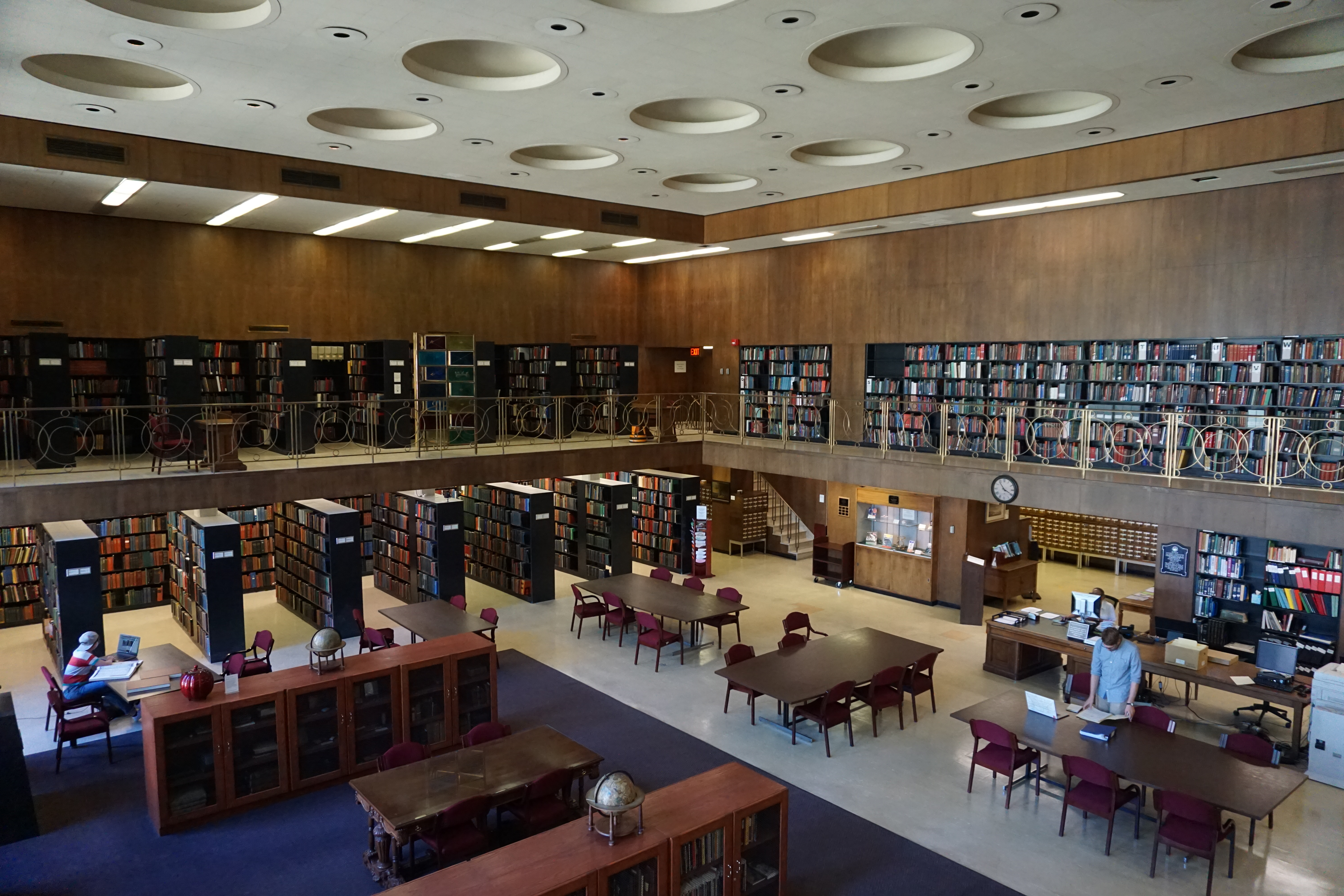
Burton Historical Collection

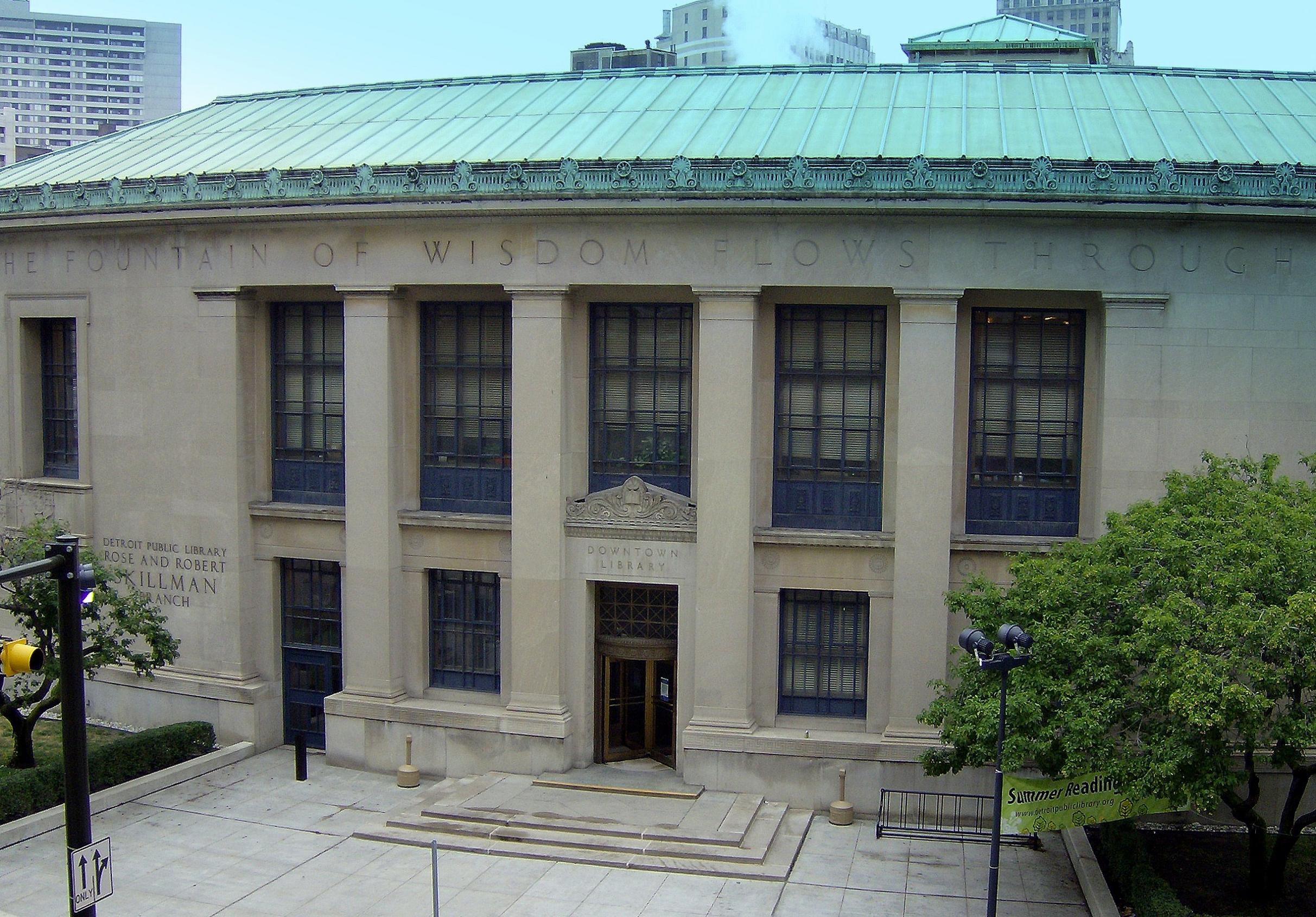
Skillman Branch, opened in 1932 on the site of the Centre Park Branch

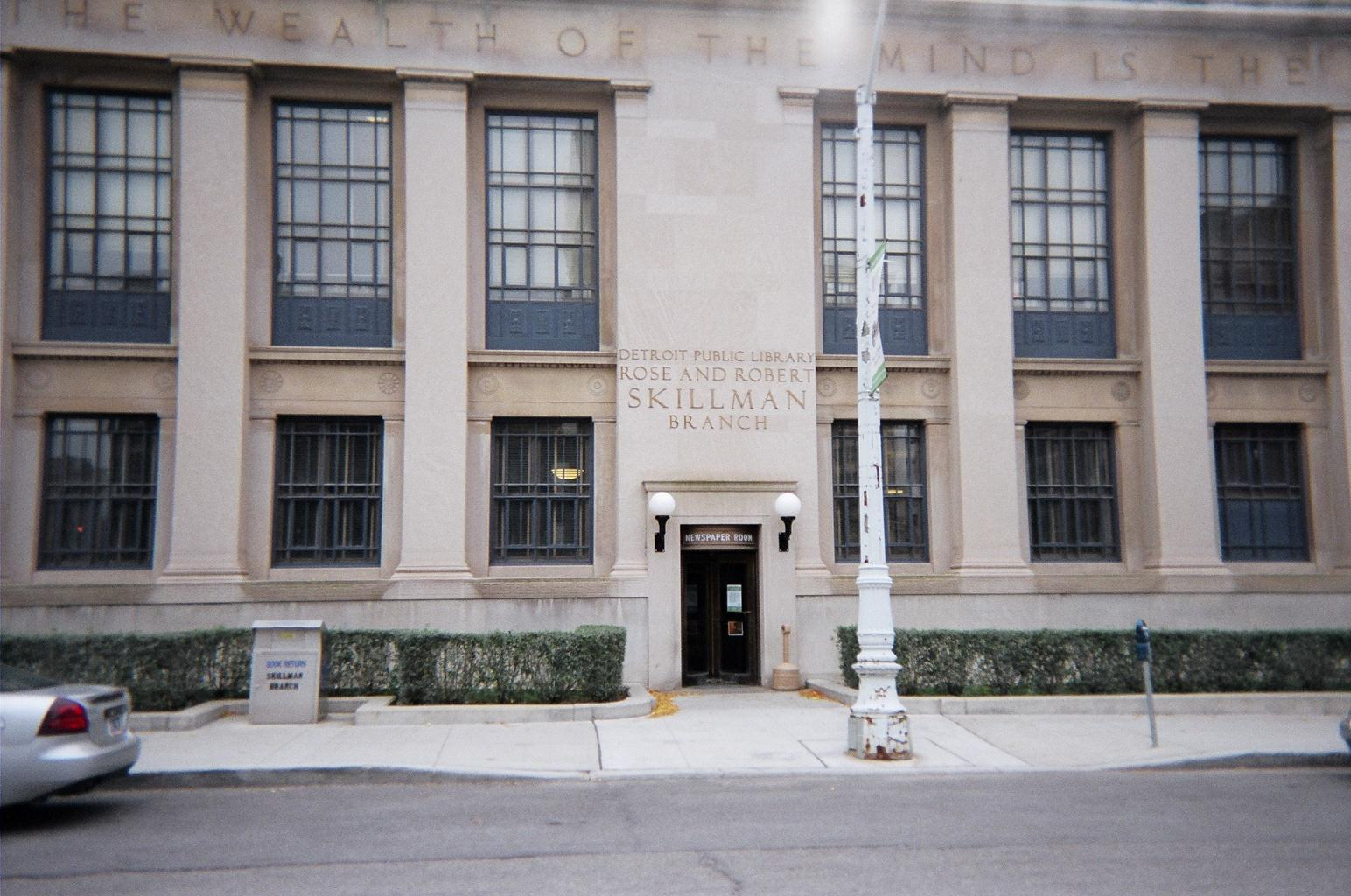
Skillman Branch seen from the aptly named Library Street

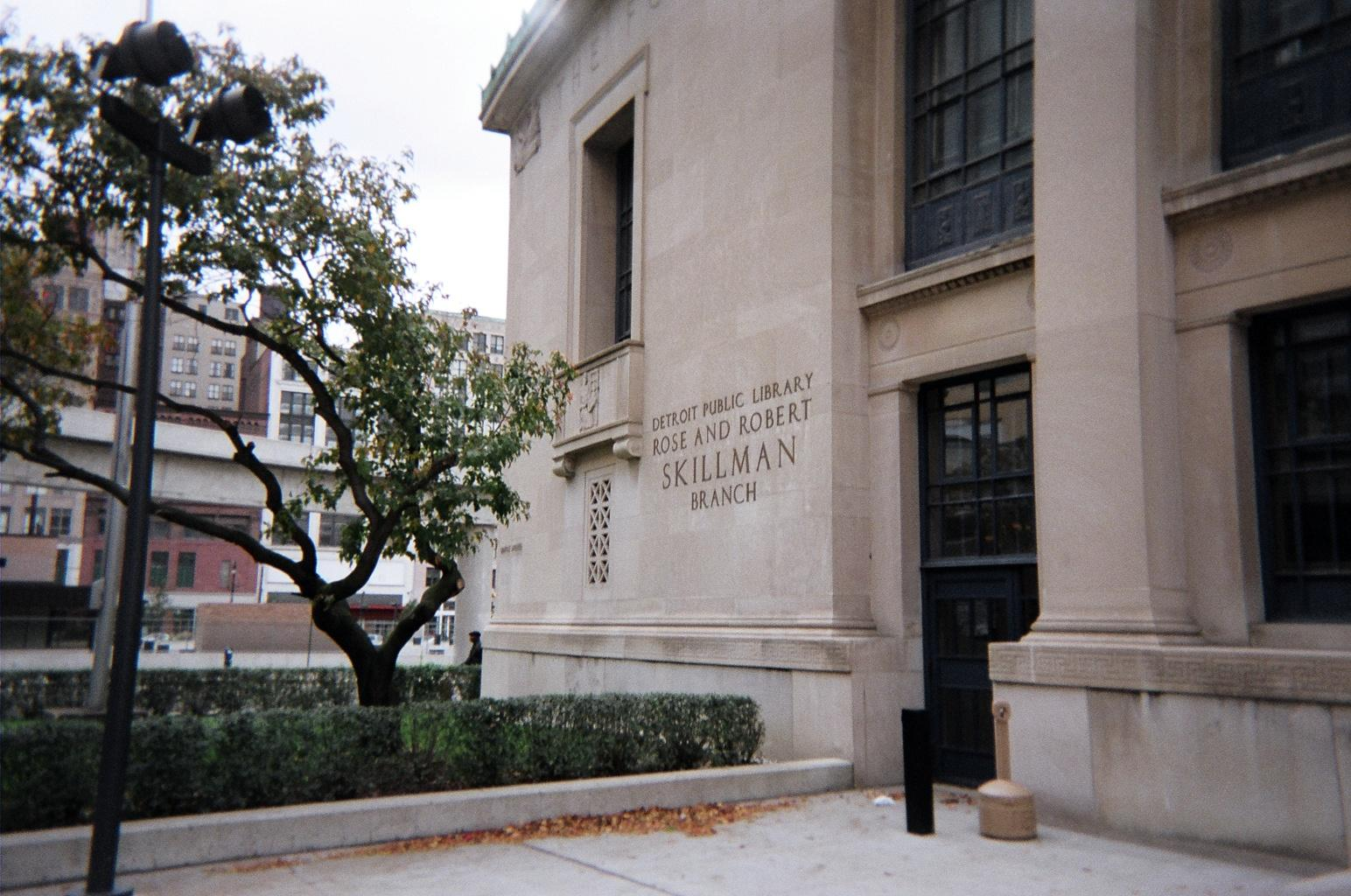
Skillman Branch reopened in 2006 after renovations

== Branches ==
Branch	Address	Opened
Herbert Bowen Branch	3648 W. Vernor/W. Grand Blvd.	
James Valentine Campbell Branch	8733 W. Vernor/Springwells	
Chandler Park Branch	12800 Harper/Dickerson	1957
Henry Chaney Branch	16101 Grand River/Greenfield	
Jessie C. Chase Branch	17731 W. Seven Mile/Southfield	
Edwin F. Conely Branch	4600 Martin/Michigan	1912
Frederick Douglass Branch, Library for the Blind and Physically Handicapped (formerly The Frederick Douglass Center for Specialized Services)	3666 Grand River/Trumbull	
Divie B. Duffield Branch	2507 W. Grand Blvd./14th St.	
Thomas A. Edison Branch	18400 Joy Rd./Southfield	
Elmwood Park Branch	550 Chene/Lafayette	
Benjamin Franklin Branch	13651 E. McNichols/Gratiot	January 1950
Bela Hubbard Branch	12929 W. McNichols/J. Couzens	
Thomas Jefferson Branch	12350 E. Outer Drive/E. Warren	October 1951
Elisabeth Knapp Branch	13330 Conant/E. Davison	October 1950
Abraham Lincoln Branch	1221 E. Seven Mile/Russell	March 1921
Main Library	5201 Woodward Ave.	October 1951
John Monteith Branch (Was scheduled to be abandoned/scrapped after Dec 22, 2011. Reopened in January 2012)	14100 Kercheval/Eastlawn	May 1926
Francis Parkman Branch	1766 Oakman Blvd./Linwood	1931
Redford Branch	21200 Grand River/W. McNichols	1981
Sherwood Forest Branch	7117 W. Seven Mile/Livernois	February 1951
Rose and Robert Skillman Branch (formerly Downtown Library)	121 Gratiot/Library	1932
Laura Ingalls Wilder Branch	7140 E. Seven Mile/Van Dyke	February 1967
Detroit Public Library - Service Center	5828 Third/Antoinette	

=== Chandler Park Branch ===
Chandler Park, in the Eastside of Detroit, is a three-story facility built in 1957. The library, which has a collection specializing in books written by African Americans, is located on Harper Avenue, in proximity to Dickerson Street. As of 2009, the interior is decorated with artwork from children living in the area and portraits of notable African-American people. In 2009 John Carlisle (Detroitblogger John) wrote in the Metro Times that most of its patrons go to the library to use its computers.

=== Frederick Douglass Branch, Library for the Blind and Physically Handicapped ===
The Douglass Branch for Specialized Services is the base of operations for the bookmobile service. It also houses the Library for the Blind and the Physically Handicapped and other special services.

=== Skillman Branch ===
The quotes on the outside of the Skillman Branch read, per side:

Gratiot Avenue : "The Fountain of Knowledge Flows Through Books"

Library Street Side: "The Wealth Of The Mind Is The Only True Wealth"

Grand River Street Side : "Religion, Knowledge, Morality"

Farmer Street Side: "Civilization is the Accumulated Culture of Mankind"

== Former branches ==
- John S. Gray Branch
- Bernard Ginsburg Branch (Closed in 1927 and turned over to Recreation Department.)
- Gabriel Richard Branch (Was located on 9876 Grand River/Stoepel. Closed due to budget cuts on December 22, 2011)
- George Van Ness Lothrop Branch (At the southwest corner of West Warren Avenue and West Grand Boulevard-demolished October 2009)
- George Osius Branch
- Henry M. Utley Branch ( 8726 Woodward Avenue, now "The Family Place". )
- Magnus Butzel Branch (At the southwest corner of Harper Avenue (I-94 Service Road) and East Grand Boulevard; demolished in 1998)
- Mark Twain Library (Closed and Relocated to Mt. Calvary Missionary Baptist Church in 1996. Demolished October 2011)
- Mark Twain Annex (Closed due to budget cuts on December 22, 2011. Located at 4741 Iroquois)
- George S. Hosmer Branch (Opened January 11, 1911 and closed May 30, 1932. Located at 3506 Gratiot Avenue. Purchased in 2016 and planned to be a bookstore and café.)
