= Marjorie Adele Blackistone Bradfield =

American librarian (1911–1999)

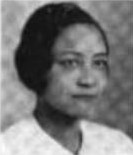
- Born: May 10, 1911; Washington, D.C., US
- Died: November 19, 1999 (aged 88); Detroit, Michigan, US
- Education: University of Michigan, Columbia University

Marjorie Adele Blackistone Bradfield (May 10, 1911 – November 19, 1999) was an American librarian who worked at the Detroit Public Library and Detroit Public Schools. She was the first African-American librarian hired at the Detroit Public Library.

== Early life and education ==
Marjorie Adele Blackistone was born May 10, 1911, in Washington, D.C.

Blackistone earned a degree from the University of Michigan in 1934 and graduated from the Columbia University School of Library Service in 1935. She married Horace Ferguson Bradfield, a physician, in 1938. She returned to the University of Michigan and received a Master of Library Science degree in 1940.

== Career ==
In 1935, Blackistone became a librarian at Roosevelt High School in Gary, Indiana.

Bradfield was hired by the Detroit Public Library in 1938, becoming the first professional African-American librarian there. She worked to improve the library's resources about African Americans, and helped establish the library's Black History collection. Bradfield left the library to raise her two children in 1950, but returned in 1964, continuing her work building the library's collection of black literature. In 1967 the Detroit City Council increased funding for minority literature due to her efforts, including money to help expand the library's Azalia Hackley Collection of black literature about the performing arts. Her recommendation to hire Clara Stanton Jones as the Detroit Public Library's first black head librarian was influential.

In 1968 Bradfield became the head librarian of the Detroit Public Schools system, where she established literature programs for Black History Month. In 1980 she retired from Detroit Public Schools.

Bradfield died in Detroit, Michigan, on November 19, 1999.
