= Ryerson and Burnham Libraries =

Art Institute of Chicago research department

Coordinates: 41°52′46″N 87°37′26″W

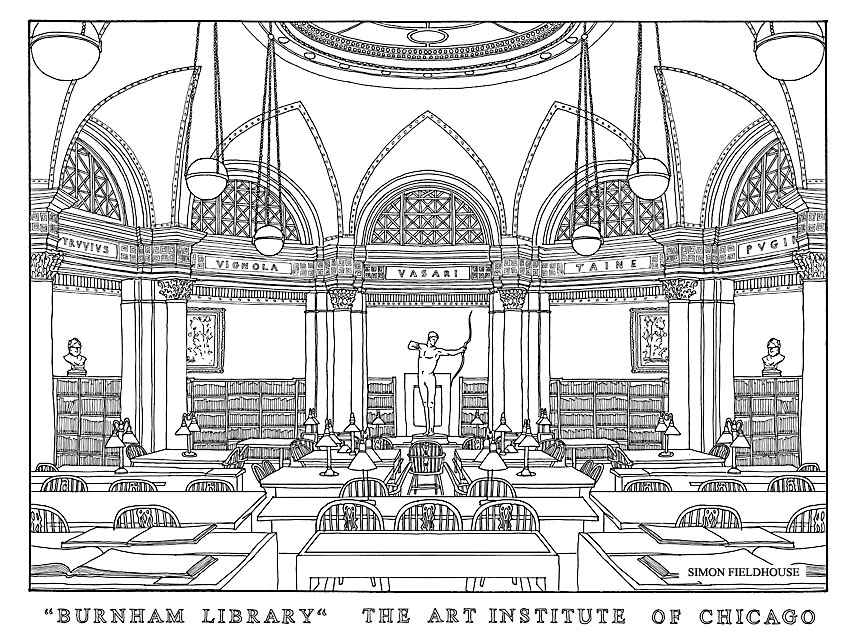
The Burnham Library in Chicago, founded in 1912

The Ryerson and Burnham Libraries are the art and architecture research collection of the Art Institute of Chicago. The libraries cover all periods with extensive holdings in the areas of 18th-, 19th- and 20th-century architecture and 19th-century painting, prints, drawings, and decorative arts. A variety of materials important to scholarly research includes architects' diaries, correspondence, job files, photographs, sketchbooks, scrapbooks, articles, transcripts, and personal papers.

== History ==
The Art Institute of Chicago's library collection commenced in 1879 as a service for students at the School of the Art Institute of Chicago and for members of the museum. Over time, two libraries developed: the Ryerson Art Library, named after trustee to the institute and contributor to the library collection Martin A. Ryerson; and the Burnham Library of Architecture, named after another trustee and nationally renowned Chicago architect, Daniel Burnham.

The libraries have since merged their two collections. The collection of 200 books in 1884 has grown over one hundredfold as the libraries continue to add about 10,000 new publications each year.

== Reading room ==
The libraries’ reading room is located just inside the Michigan Avenue entrance of the museum, to the south of the grand staircase.

The original Ryerson Library consisted solely of the Franke Reading Room. Designed in the 1880s by Shepley, Rutan and Coolidge, the Franke Reading Room was built at the site of the building's original courtyard.

Elmer Garnsey designed the interior's decorative scheme and Louis Millet designed the central skylight. Both the interior and the stained glass ceiling fixture were restored during the 1990s by the architect Johh Vinci, who was also responsible for work done on the Chicago College of Performing Arts.

Included in the design is the inscription of significant writers in art and architecture on entablatures that circle the reading room. Throughout the space are artworks from the Art Institute's permanent collection. In alcoves surrounding reader workspace are shelves of reference books, indexes and subscribed periodicals.

== Access to the Libraries ==
The Libraries are open to museum staff, members, volunteers, School of the Art Institute faculty and alumni, visiting curators and scholars, college and university students, faculty, and staff. Researchers who do not fall into any of these categories may access the libraries with a few restrictions. This is a noncirculating research library.

Visitors can access the Libraries' catalog online. Also available through the website are images, finding aids to archival collections, and digitized special collections.

Some archival image and text collections have been digitized and are searchable from the Ryerson & Burnham Libraries' website and Explore Chicago Collections.

Archival records included:

- Daniel Burnham
- Bruce Goff
- Bertrand Goldberg
- Walter Burley Griffin and Marion Mahony Griffin
- Irving Penn
- Percier and Fontaine
- Louis Sullivan
- Mies van der Rohe
- Frank Lloyd Wright
- Century of Progress
- World's Columbian Exposition
