= Ryerson Library =

Older wing of the main public library in Grand Rapids, Michigan, United States

Ryerson Building
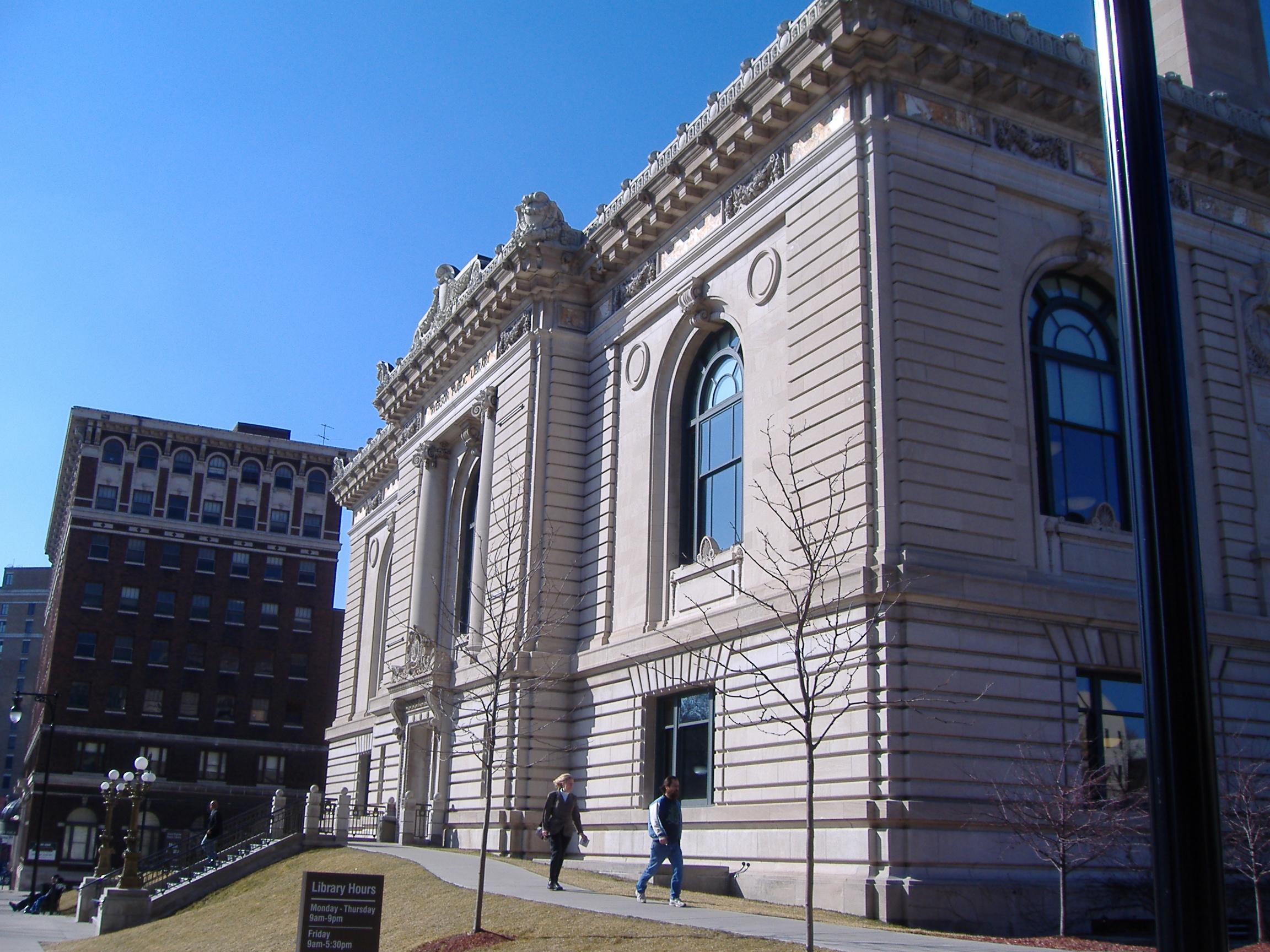
- Ryerson Building
- Interactive map of the Ryerson Building area

General information
- Location: Grand Rapids, Michigan, United States
- Coordinates: 42.96462°N 85.66594°W
- Opened: October 1904
- Renovated: 2004
- Owner: Grand Rapids Public Library

Website
- Grand Rapids Public Library

The Ryerson Building is the older wing of the main public library in Grand Rapids, Michigan, United States.

== History ==
The Ryerson Building was the first permanent home of the Grand Rapids Library. The city's library had previously been housed in commercial buildings and later on the second floor of the city hall, even though that space was deemed inadequate even before the facility moved there. Andrew Carnegie pledged $150,000 to support the new facility, but the building was named for its other donor, Martin A. Ryerson, a Grand Rapids native. The cornerstone was laid July 4, 1902 and the building opened October 5, 1904.

In 1966, work began to expand the structure. In 1967, the library more than doubled in size with the addition of The Keeler Wing more than doubled the size of the building. Work also included renovations of the Ryerson Building.

In 2001, the library board sought bids to renovate both buildings in anticipation of the Ryerson's upcoming centennial in 2004.
