= Muskegon Area District Library =

- Location: Muskegon County, Michigan, United States
- Established: 1938
- Branches: 12

Collection
- Size: 188,881 physical items; 8,053,965 e-items

Access and use
- Population served: Over 105,000

Other information
- Director: Ron Suszek
- Website: www.madl.org

The Muskegon Area District Library (MADL) is the largest (Class 6) multi-branch library system in Muskegon County with eleven community locations and one bookmobile. The administration headquarters are located in Fruitport Township.

== Branches ==
- Bookmobile
- Dalton
- Egelston
- Holton
- Laketon
- Library for the Visually and Physically Disabled
- Montague
- Muskegon Heights
- Muskegon Township
- North Muskegon
- Norton Shores
- Ravenna

== History ==
In the mid-1930s, James TenBrink, the County School Commissioner, was concerned that there were no public and few school libraries in Muskegon County outside the City of Muskegon. In response, he and the Muskegon County Teachers Club created the Muskegon County School Library in 1936. It was located in TenBrink's office in the Muskegon County Court House.

Within two years, the response was so great that it was decided to transition the service into a separate organization with outside funding. This became the Muskegon County Library in 1938, formed under the Michigan Public Act 138 of 1917 with the assistance of the State Library and the Muskegon County Board of Supervisors.

The first library board consisted of James TenBrink as chairman, Rena Hoeker, Raymond R. Oehrli, Helen LeJeune, and Pearl Plummer.

As a result of a millage campaign in 2006, the Muskegon Area District Library was created.

The library system celebrated it 80th anniversary in 2018.

In 2021, the Township Branch re-located into a newly built modern space at the Quarter-Apple Mall. Also, a new Bookmobile began new outreach services in 2021.

A new branch in Laketon Township was created in 2022.

== Circulation ==
The library ended 2021 with a circulation count of 631,115.

== Mission statement ==
=== Mission ===
"The Muskegon Area District Library connects a diverse community to resources and services that educate, inform, enrich and entertain."

=== Vision ===
"The Muskegon Area District Library is recognized as a primary resource for literacy and learning; a gathering place for families, cultural and civic life; and a contributor to the community's economic development. We ensure public sharing of digital and print materials, and innovative technologies."

== Cooperatives ==
MADL is a part of the Lakeland Library Cooperative and Michigan eLibrary (MeL).

== Online Resources ==
MADL patrons have access to the following online resources:

- Libby by OverDrive
- cloudLibrary
- Freegal Music
- Hoopla Digital
- RBDigital
- Kanopy
- Newsbank
- Pronunciator
- Ancestry Library Edition
- Value Line
- ReferenceUSA
- SCOLA
- LearningExpressLibrary
- Driving-Tests.org
- Brainfuse Online Tutoring
- Tumble Book Library

== Storyville ==
"Muskegon Storyville Villages are early literacy, child-sized villages, where children ages 0-5 and their parents/caregivers can let their imaginations run wild! Each village helps children prepare for Kindergarten by focusing on playing, reading, singing, talking, and writing. Villages are located in the Montague, Muskegon Heights, and Norton Shores MADL branches."
