= Martin A. Ryerson =

American lawyer, businessman, philanthropist and art collector (1856–1932)

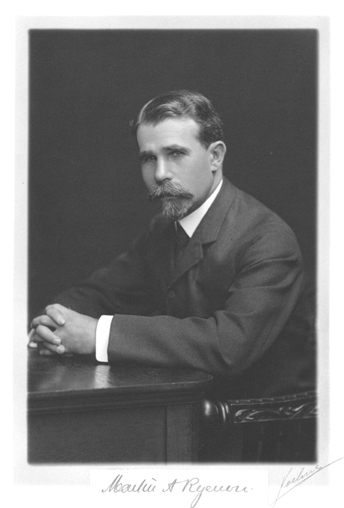
- Born: 1856; Michigan, U.S.
- Died: August 11, 1932 (aged 75–76); Lake Geneva, Wisconsin, U.S.
- Resting place: Graceland Cemetery
- Education: Harvard Law School
- Spouse: Carrie Ryerson
- Parent(s): Martin L. Ryerson; Mary Ann Campau
- Relatives: Louis Campau (maternal uncle)

Martin Antoine Ryerson (1856–1932) was an American lawyer, businessman, philanthropist and art collector. Heir to a considerable fortune, he was a lumber manufacturer and corporate director. He became the richest man in Chicago by the age of 36. A long-time trustee of the University of Chicago, he made large charitable contributions for the construction of buildings on campus. He bequeathed his extensive art collection to the Art Institute of Chicago.

== Early life and education ==
Martin A. Ryerson was born in 1856 in Michigan. His father, Martin L. Ryerson, was a lumber baron in Michigan forests who invested in real estate in Downtown Chicago. His mother, Mary Ann Campau, was the niece of Louis Campau, the founder of Grand Rapids, Michigan and member of the Detroit's Campau family.

Ryerson grew up in Chicago. He was educated in Paris and Geneva. He graduated from the Harvard Law School in 1878.

== Career ==
Ryerson started his career as a lawyer. In 1880, he joined the family business, working for his father, who owned the only remaining lumberyard in Chicago in the aftermath of the Great Chicago Fire of 1871. As a lumber manufacturer, Ryerson was Chicago's richest man by the age of thirty-six.

Ryerson served on the board of directors of the Continental Illinois National Bank and Trust Company, Northern Trust, and the Elgin National Watch Company.

== Philanthropy ==
Ryerson served as the president of the board of trustees of the University of Chicago from 1892 to 1922. He donated over $2 million to the university, including $350,000 for the construction of the Ryerson Physical Laboratory and $25,000 for the establishment of the Harper Memorial Library on campus. Additionally, he endowed the Martin A. Ryerson Distinguished Service Professorship in 1925.

Ryerson served on the board of trustees of the Rockefeller Foundation. He served as honorary President of the Art Institute of Chicago. He also served as the Vice President of the Field Columbian Museum from 1894. He donated $300,000 to build the Ryerson Library in Grand Rapids, Michigan.

== Art collection ==
Ryerson maintained an art collection. He was the owner of five paintings by Pierre-Auguste Renoir and sixteen paintings by Claude Monet. He also collected paintings by Old Masters.

== Personal life ==
With his wife Carrie, Ryerson resided at 4851 South Drexel Boulevard in Chicago. They summered at Bonnie Brae, an estate in Lake Geneva, Wisconsin. Ryerson was a member of the Lake Geneva Yacht Club, where the Martin A. Ryerson Trophy is named in his honor.

Richard T. Crane was Martin L. Ryerson's nephew, and therefore Martin A.'s first cousin. When Richard T. lost his job in New York City, his uncle Martin encouraged him to move to Chicago. Richard T. later founded the Crane Co.

== Death and legacy ==
Ryerson died on August 11, 1932, in Lake Geneva, Wisconsin. He was buried in the Martin Ryerson Tomb at the Graceland Cemetery in Chicago, Illinois. At the time of his death, his estate was valued at $5 million, $3 million of which was invested in real estate. Upon his death, he bequeathed the entire sum to charities, family members and former employees. For example, his widow inherited one tenth, $500,000, as well as an annual income of $200,000. He also bequeathed $25,000 to Harvard University, $25,000 to Kenyon College, and $25,000 to the Little Sisters of the Poor. His art collection was donated to the Art Institute of Chicago. Edward W. Forbes served as the Martin A. Ryerson Professor in the Fine Arts at Harvard University from 1935 to 1944.

== See also ==
- Ryerson & Burnham Libraries
- The Alarm (Boyle)
