= College & Research Libraries News =

Professional magazine devoted to library science

- Editor-in-chief: David Free
- Categories: Library science
- Frequency: 11/year
- Publisher: Association of College and Research Libraries
- Founded: 1966
- Country: United States
- Based in: Chicago, IL
- Language: English
- Website: crln.acrl.org
- ISSN: 0099-0086 (print); 2150-6698 (web)
- OCLC: 2102916

College & Research Libraries News is a professional magazine that covers trends and practices affecting academic and research libraries and serves as the official news magazine and publication of record of the Association of College and Research Libraries. It was established in 1966 and is published 11 times a year. It is sometimes confused with another publication of the association, College & Research Libraries.
