= Capital Area District Library =

Library system in Michigan, United States

Capital Area District Libraries
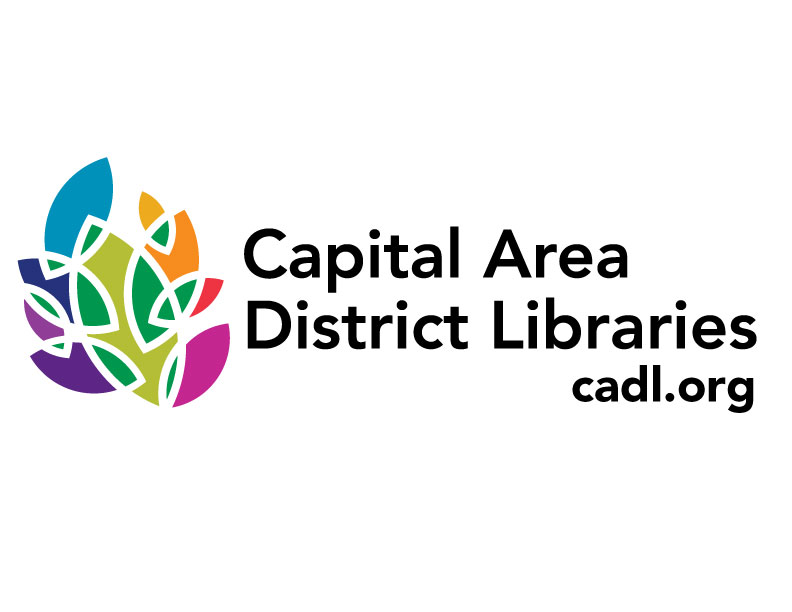
- Location: Ingham County, Michigan
- Established: 1998
- Branches: 13

Collection
- Size: 630,864

Access and use
- Circulation: 2,288,317
- Population served: ≈ 243,677
- Members: 98,121

Other information
- Budget: $10,625,814
- Director: Jolee Hamlin (interim)
- Employees: 222
- Website: www.cadl.org

Capital Area District Libraries (CADL) is a system of libraries in Ingham County, Michigan, United States. It was formed in 1998 by an agreement between Ingham County and the City of Lansing. It consists of thirteen libraries and a mobile library. CADL is governed by a seven-member board, five of which are selected by Ingham County, and the remaining two are selected by the City of Lansing. CADL also participates with the Michigan eLibrary. The Friends of the Library support Capital Area District Libraries through fundraising and community outreach.

The City of East Lansing maintains a separate library system (East Lansing Public Library).

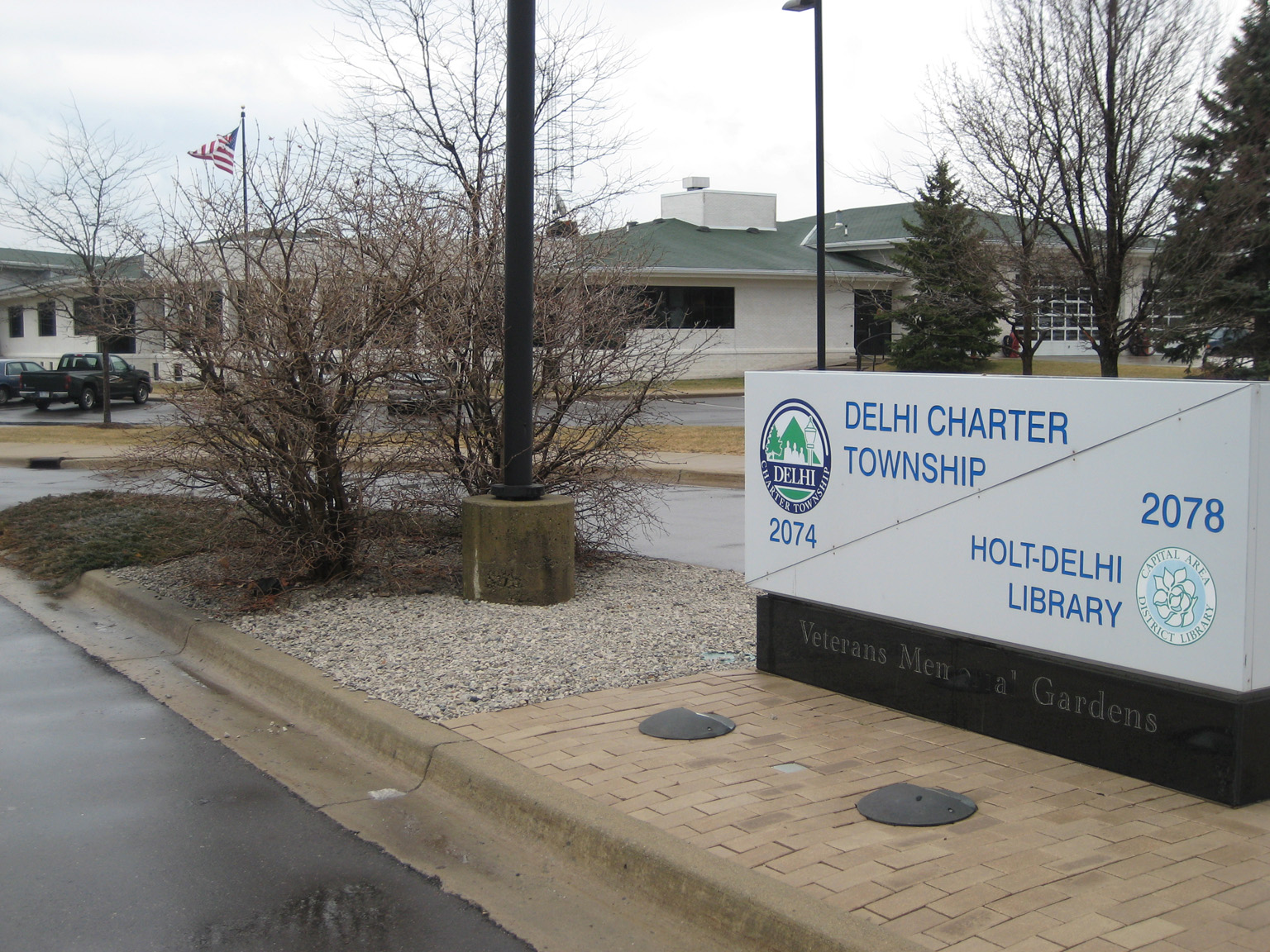
CADL Holt-Delhi in Delhi Township

== Administration and board ==
- Management team
- Board of trustees

== Branches ==
- CADL Aurelius - Aurelius
- CADL Dansville - Dansville
- CADL Foster - Lansing
- CADL Haslett - Haslett
- CADL Holt-Delhi - Holt
- CADL Okemos - Okemos
- CADL Leslie - Leslie
- CADL Downtown Lansing - Lansing
- CADL Mason - Mason
- CADL South Lansing - Lansing
- CADL Stockbridge - Stockbridge
- CADL Webberville - Webberville
- CADL Williamston - Williamston
- Mobile Library

== StoryWalk ==
StoryWalk encourages families to enjoy reading and the outdoors by posting a children's book - a page or two at a time - at intervals in a park, hiking trail or other outdoor site. StoryWalk includes activities like talking, reading, writing, singing and playing to help your child develop important early literacy skills.CADL has 13 sites throughout Ingham County, Michigan.

== Student Success Initiative ==
The Student Success Initiative debuted in 2019, beginning with nearly 600 students in Webberville, Michigan. Currently, more than 20,000 students from 10 different Michigan school districts (Dansville, Haslett, Holt, Lansing, Leslie, Mason, Okemos, Stockbridge, Webberville and Williamston) are served through the SSI program. Through this initiative, students in participating districts can get a library card no matter where they live. It gives them access to books, audiobooks, magazines and more in both digital and physical formats.

== Awards and recognition ==
- 2020 Michigan Library Association Public Librarian of the Year (Jessica Trotter)
- 2020 American Library Association PR Xchange Award Competition Winner (four winning entries)
- 2019 State Librarian's Award of Excellence
- 2019 Library of Michigan's Quality Services Audit Checklist Award (Excellent Level)
