= Midwest Universities Consortium for International Activities =

The Midwest Universities Consortium for International Activities, Inc. (MUCIA) is a Midwestern United States consortium of 10 Big Ten public research universities that collaborates on large-scale projects in developing countries. MUCIA was established in 1964 with support from the Ford Foundation.

== Members ==
- University of Illinois at Urbana–Champaign
- Indiana University Bloomington
- University of Iowa
- University of Michigan
- Michigan State University
- University of Minnesota
- Ohio State University
- Pennsylvania State University
- Purdue University
- University of Wisconsin–Madison
