= Grand Rapids Public Library =

Public library system in Michigan, USA

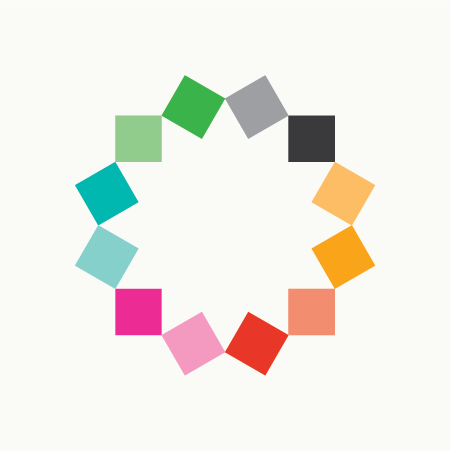

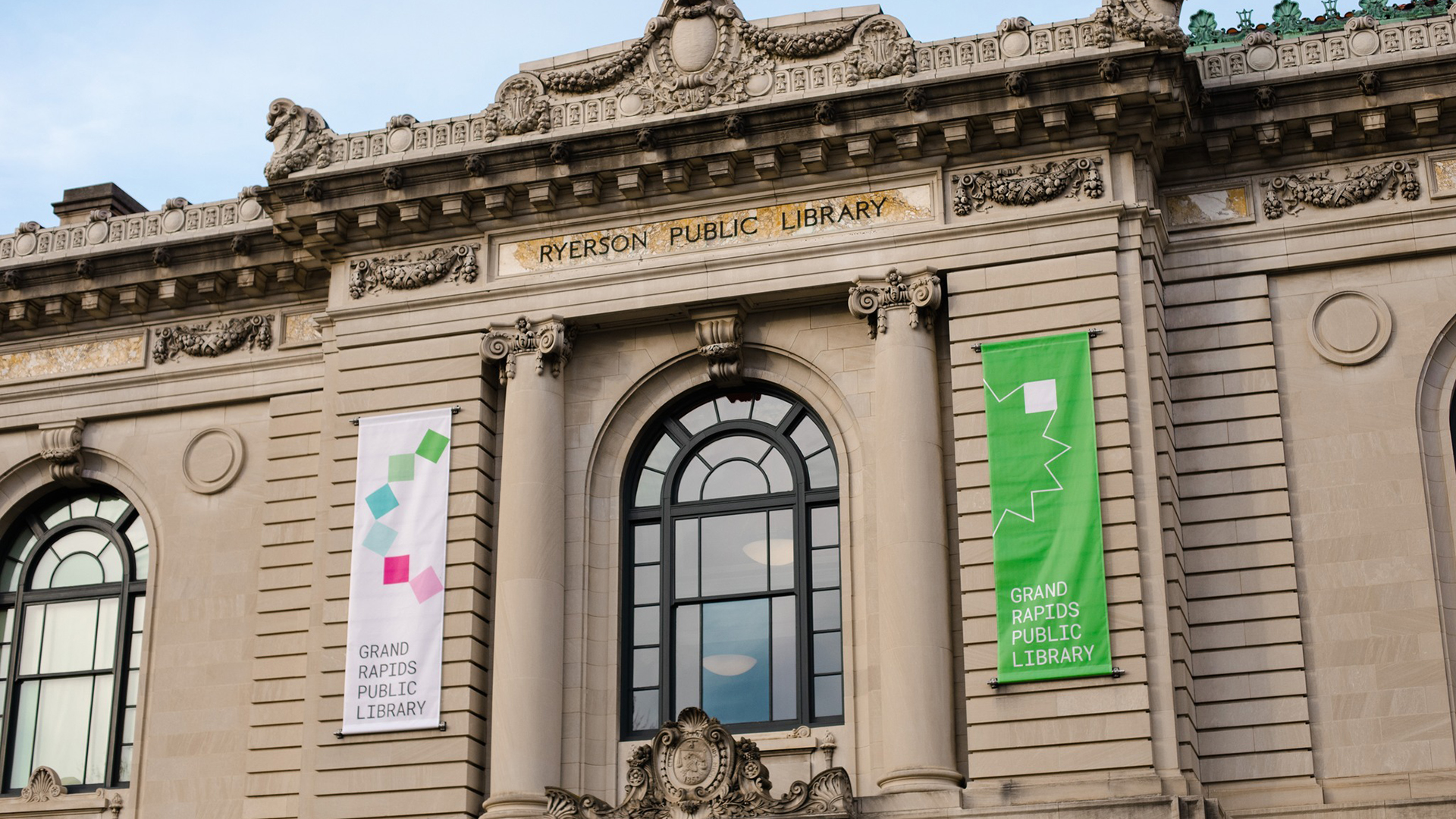
- Main library
- 42.9649°N 85.6659°W
- Location: Grand Rapids, Michigan
- Established: 1871
- Branches: 8

Collection
- Size: 2,219,688

Access and use
- Population served: 200,808 (2026 est.)

Other information
- Budget: $15.6 million (2026)
- Director: John McNaughton
- Employees: 170
- Website: http://www.grpl.org

The Grand Rapids Public Library (GRPL) is the public library system of Grand Rapids, Michigan, United States. Founded in 1871, the system consists of a Main Library in downtown Grand Rapids and seven branch libraries throughout the city. GRPL is governed by a publicly elected Board of Library Commissioners.

== History ==
The Grand Rapids Public Library was founded in 1871 through a partnership between the Grand Rapids Board of Education, the Ladies Literary Association, and the YMCA. In 1904, the Main Library moved into the Ryerson Building, a gift from Grand Rapids native and Chicago philanthropist Martin A. Ryerson, who assumed funding of the project after Andrew Carnegie withdrew his pledge. The first branch library, the West Side Branch, opened in 1908. A major addition to the Main Library was dedicated in 1969, more than doubling its size.

In 1997, voters approved a millage to fund improvements to the city's libraries, with a large portion directed toward renovating the Main Library. Renovation began in 2001, integrating the original 1904 Ryerson Building with its 1960s addition, which was renamed the Keeler wing in honor of a $1.2 million gift from Mike and Mary Ann Keeler. The renovation was completed in 2003. In 2021, GRPL celebrated its 150th anniversary.

== Foundation ==
The Grand Rapids Public Library Foundation (GRPLF) is an independent 501(c)(3) charitable organization that provides fundraising and advocacy support for GRPL, administering funds for endowment, capital, and special projects. The Foundation provided funding for the DigiBridge Initiative, a partnership with Grand Rapids Public Schools aimed at improving access to digital library resources for 17,000 students, which earned GRPL the 2015 Public Library Association Upstart Library Innovation Award.

== Locations ==
Branch	Address
Main Library	111 Library St. NE
Madison Square Branch	1201 Madison SE
Ottawa Hills Branch	1150 Giddings SE
Seymour Branch	2350 Eastern SE
Van Belkum Branch	1563 Plainfield NE
West Leonard Branch	1017 Leonard NW
West Side Branch	713 Bridge NW
Yankee Clipper Branch	2025 Leonard NE
