= Detroit Area Library Network =

The Detroit Area Library Network (DALNET) is a multi-type library consortium located on the campus of Wayne State University in Detroit, Michigan, United States. The consortium is open to academic, public, school and special libraries as well as information organizations located in southeast Michigan. DALNET member organizations agree to participate in some or all consortium ventures and remain committed to resource sharing. Most DALNET members participate in using the shared library systems of the consortium.

Hosted at Wayne State University since 1985, DALNET enables libraries to maximize their investments through shared resources. For over four decades the consortium has helped member libraries to serve the information needs of their users through innovative, collaborative networking among various types of libraries and their personnel.
