= Muskegon Community College =

Public college in Muskegon, Michigan, US

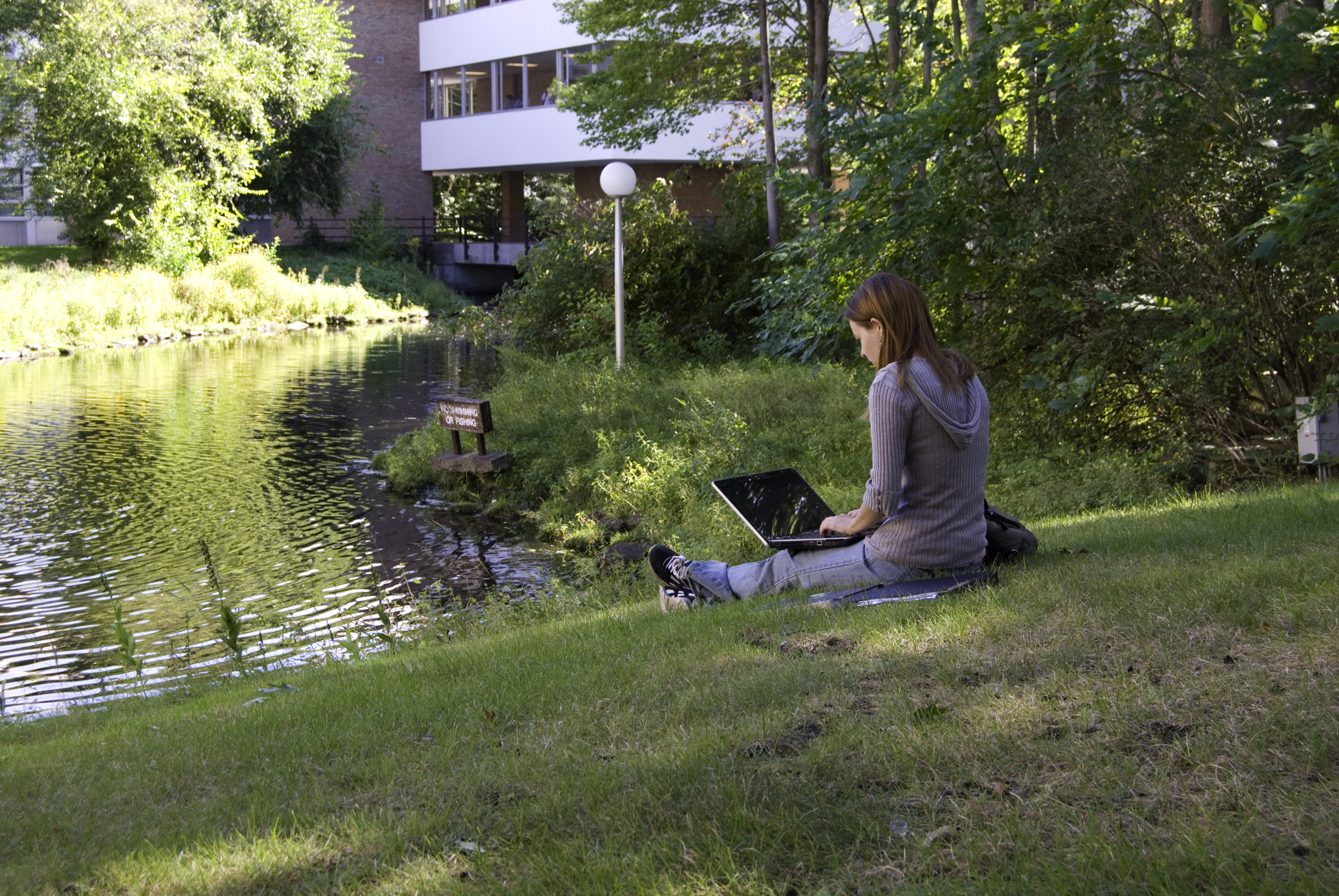
- Muskegon Community College campus
- Former name: Muskegon Junior College (1926-1951)
- Type: Public community college
- Established: 1926
- President: John Selmon
- Students: 4,078 (Fall 2018)
- Location: Muskegon, Michigan, United States; 43.2492°N 86.1957°W
- Campus: Urban
- Colors: Royal Blue, Gold
- Nickname: Jayhawks
- Mascot: Jay
- Website: muskegoncc.edu

Muskegon Community College (MCC) is a public community college in Muskegon, Michigan. The college offers 49 associate degree programs and 33 certificate programs. The college's main campus is located on a 111-acre campus in Muskegon, with extension centers in Ottawa and Newaygo counties.

MCC was founded as Muskegon Junior College in 1926 and has been continually accredited by the Higher Learning Commission since 1929. The community college district was created via the Michigan Constitution of 1963 along with an elected board of trustees and the college moved to its current campus location, an Alden B. Dow designed facility that opened to the public in 1967. In 1995, the Stevenson Center for Higher Education opened; it comprised a consortium of Ferris State University, Grand Valley State University, and Western Michigan University, designed to increase access to educational opportunities for Muskegon residents. In 2010 the Outdoor Learning Lab, a focal point of green technology and center for MCC's new Alternative and Renewable Energy certificate program, opened. Several new or expanded buildings were constructed or commissioned from 2014.

== History ==
=== Establishment ===
Muskegon Junior College was established by the Muskegon Board of Education in 1926 and was housed on the third floor of what was then the new Muskegon High School. It was a pioneering effort, since only four other two-year institutions existed in Michigan at the time.

By 1934, enrollment of both the college and the high school had grown beyond the capacity of a single building. The Junior College, therefore, moved into the former Hackley School in downtown Muskegon across from Hackley Park (now the Board of Education Building).

It was appropriate that the college should occupy the old Hackley building, which had been presented to the public schools of Muskegon by Charles Hackley after fire had destroyed the original Central School. The city's First Citizen believed that a community was obliged to offer its youth the kind of training which would enable them to earn a good livelihood and at the same time contribute to the well-being of the community.

At the time of its move into this facility and for 17 years after, Muskegon Junior College was primarily geared to those students intending to complete at least four years of college. Muskegon's reputation in this field of the "college transfer" program was an enviable one, and continues to be so today.

Then in June 1951, after an enabling act by the Michigan Legislature, the name and educational scope of the college was changed. "Muskegon Junior College" became "Muskegon Community College," thereby reflecting the expanded nature of the college's programs.

They were broadened to serve a larger number of students with a wider variety of interests. Courses were added in retailing, the vocations, the technical fields, public health, and the trades. These courses enabled young men and women to prepare themselves for a specific field of employment in two years of training beyond high school. There was no shrinking of the transfer program, only an expanded curriculum to serve a larger segment of the community.

In the post World War II years, enrollment climbed quickly and the Community College "campus" had to grow accordingly. The Muskegon Board of Education, which still operated the college, utilized available space in many of its buildings, and rented other community facilities when enrollment exceeded the capacities of those buildings.

By the early 1960s, enrollment had topped 2,000 and the college was operating full-time at Hackley, Vanderlaan, and Wilson schools and part-time at eight other locations. The time had come for another step in the development of the college.

The Board of Education formed a Special Citizens Committee to study the entire program and make recommendations. The Committee proposed that the college be separated from the public school system, that a county-wide community college district be created, that a board of trustees be elected to plan, build, and operate the school, and that millage be voted in sufficient amount and for enough years to build and operate the college.

=== New campus ===
In April 1963, the county overwhelmingly approved the recommendations of the committee and elected the first board of trustees. The elected board went to work immediately and by September of that year had purchased the 111-acre (0.45 km^{2}) campus on which the college exists today.

Alden B. Dow and Associates was named architect and by the summer of 1965 drawings were completed and construction begun. The Vocational-Technical Wing was completed and occupied in the fall of 1966 and the following September the entire complex was placed in service. Formal dedication ceremonies were held October 22, 1967, with Dr. Ashley Montagu, one of the world's foremost anthropologists, delivering the dedicatory address.

The first addition to the new campus was the Frauenthal Foundation Fine Arts Center, completed in 1968 and named for the Muskegon industrialist whose gift had made the Center possible – A. Harold Frauenthal.

When the new district was created, the name of the college was changed to Muskegon County Community College; but in the spring of 1969, at the request of the board of trustees, the State Board of Education approved changing the name once again to Muskegon Community College.

=== University outreach ===
January 1995 brought the completion of the Stevenson Center for Higher Education on the campus of Muskegon Community College. The Center houses upper-level courses and programs offered by Ferris State University, Grand Valley State University, Michigan State University, and Western Michigan University. These institutions, along with Muskegon Community College, have formed a "consortium" to coordinate offerings to meet the needs of West Michigan residents.

The 90,000-square-foot (8,400 m^{2}) facility is about one-third the size of the main building and was constructed to complement existing architecture. Attached to the main building near the Technical Wing, the James L. Stevenson Center for Higher Education contains communication technology with all of its 35 rooms connected via fiber optics for voice, video and data transmission. In addition to housing the educational programs of the consortium member institutions, the center is also the new home for MCC's Media Center and Graphic Design program.

=== Further developments ===
Newly opened in January 2006, the Hendrik Meijer Library Information Technology Center offers students and the community communication capabilities, including wireless Internet access, library facilities/technologies and classrooms, and an Internet café. The 40,000-square-foot (3,700 m^{2}) facility has three levels overlooking the woods and creek, and offers special services including interlibrary loan, photocopy machines, group study rooms, a quiet reading room, a workstation for visually impaired persons, and both group and individual orientations.

In 2010 the Outdoor Learning Center, featuring a green roof, opened to the public. The Center contains many alternative energy demonstration technologies, serving as a laboratory for MCC students enrolled in a certificate program for Wind and Solar Alternative Energy technologies.

Building upon its two decades of offering classes in Grand Haven, MCC opened its Ottawa County Center in 2012 inside the Grand Haven Community Center.

In 2012, MCC and the Muskegon Area Intermediate School District (MAISD) launched the Early College of Muskegon County offering select high school students an intense five-year program leading to both a high school diploma and an associate degree. The concept was expanded and MCC offered Early College of Newaygo County, North Ottawa County Early College and South Ottawa Early College.

In November 2013, Muskegon County voters approved $24 million to support four MCC facilities expansion projects outlined as goals in the college's 2010-2015 Master Plan. To provide additional support for the Plan, MCC raised in excess of $20 million from grants, gifts and private donations.

In September 2014, MCC signed a purchase agreement with The Herald Publishing Co. LLC and the owners of the former Muskegon Chronicle building, to buy the building and an adjacent parking lot for a downtown campus. In December 2017, the Peter and Carolyn I. Sturrus Technology Center opened as the new home to MCC's Applied Technology programs in CAD, Electronics/Automation, Engineering, Machining, Metal Casting, Materials, and Welding, as well as to MCC's Experiential Learning Program.

In June 2015, local developer Jonathan Rooks donated the 23,790 square-foot former Masonic Temple to MCC for its Entrepreneurial Studies program and related business-generating activities. Nick Sarnicola, a West Michigan native and highly successful entrepreneur, and his wife, Ashley, then created a $200,000 permanent endowment through their Next Gen Foundation to the Foundation for Muskegon Community College to support an annual $10,000 cash award for the best business idea generated by an MCC entrepreneurial program graduate. The Rooks-Sarnicola Entrepreneur Institute opened in June 2018 and also houses the Lakeshore Fab Lab.

In August 2015, MCC opened its $9.6 million Science Center, home to the MCC Life Sciences Department and the college's biology labs and research areas. In April 2016, the facility earned the Leadership in Energy and Environmental Design (LEED) Gold Certification for its sustainable strategies used in its design and construction - one of only four buildings in Muskegon to have received this high honor.

The same year, MCC purchased the Muskegon Family YMCA's West Western Avenue property on Muskegon Lake for $1.17 million as part of the college's community-focused health and wellness initiative, which includes the construction of a new center on campus. The building opened in 2016 at the MCC Lakeshore Fitness Center.

In 2017, MCC was the top-ranked Michigan community college by BestColleges.com for its gainful employment, graduation rates, and earnings outcomes. MCC has earned acclaim as a national leader in student success, having been named an Achieving the Dream Leader College, as well as a Top 50 Best Value community college in the U.S. MCC ranked 27th among the 1,711 community and other two-year colleges in the nation evaluated for gainful employment and earnings outcomes.

In November 2018, the 52,000 square foot MCC Health and Wellness Center opened on the main campus. The facility houses the college's Health, Physical Education and Recreation Department; the Medical Assistant Program; the Athletic Department Office; a state-of-the-art Health Simulation Lab for MCC students in nursing, respiratory therapy, and medical assistant programs; learning spaces and classrooms; the Ron Gaffner Multipurpose Room; a regulation wood floor gymnasium; a one-tenth mile indoor running track; and a fitness center. The Mercy Health Partners Primary Care Center, a collaboration between MCC and its Mercy Health and Grand Valley State University educational partners, is also located there.

Muskegon Community College identified the art and music programs for upgrades as part of its Facilities Master Plan. After years of planning, the 85,000 square foot Art and Music Building opened to students on August 26, 2019. The $9 million renovation project transformed the vacated Applied Technology Building into a state-of-the-art facility supporting the educational pursuits of arts and music as well as relocating the Automotive Program to a separate and adjacent space.

== Campus ==
The campus is located on the northwest corner of Marquette Ave. and Quarterline Rd., near the boundary of Muskegon, Michigan and Muskegon Township, Michigan. It extends westward towards Harvey Street along U.S. Highway 31, where the Muskegon Area Career Technical Center is located. University Park Golf Course, the only community college-owned golf course in the State of Michigan, opened in 1968 and is located across from the main campus at the northeast corner of the intersection.

The Academic Complex was designed by Alden B. Dow. It features an enclosed court and two wings, with Four-Mile Creek flowing underneath.

The 111-acre (0.45 km^{2}) campus includes the Technology Building, the Hendrik Meijer Library & Information Technology Center (opened January 2006), the Bartels-Rode Gymnasium, the Frauenthal Foundation Fine Arts Center with the Overbrook Theater and Art Gallery, the Stevenson Center for Higher Education, the Science Center, the Health and Wellness Center, and an Art Building.

The main building has three levels: Level 1 is at ground level. Level 2 is below it. Level 3 is at the bottom.

=== Service area ===
As defined by the Michigan Legislature, the official service area of Muskegon Community College includes territory within the following school districts:

- Muskegon Public Schools
- Muskegon Heights Public Schools
- North Muskegon Public Schools
- Orchard View Schools
- Oakridge Public Schools
- Reeths-Puffer Schools
- Holton Public Schools
- Montague Area Public Schools
- Ravenna Public Schools
- Whitehall District Schools
- Grand Haven Area Public Schools
- Spring Lake Public Schools
- Fruitport Community Schools
- Mona Shores School District

== Stevenson Center for Higher Education ==
The Stevenson Center for Higher Education opened in 1995. Originally named the Muskegon Center for Higher Education, it was named in honor of James Stevenson, the College President who spearheaded its construction.

The top floor houses a television studio, a computer laboratory, a conference room, a lecture hall, media services, graphics technology. The middle floor houses conference rooms and classrooms, and the bottom floor houses classrooms.

In addition, the Center houses programs from the following universities.

- Ferris State University
- Grand Valley State University
- Western Michigan University
- Michigan State University

== Muskegon Area Career Technical Center ==
The Career Technical Center houses K-12 vocational-technical programs in partnership with the Muskegon Area Intermediate School District. It opened in 2005.

== MCC-TV ==
Muskegon Community College operates MCC-TV, a Public, educational, and government access (PEG) cable TV station, that markets educational, cultural and informative programs that advance the mission of the college. MCC TV can be viewed in Muskegon County and Newaygo County on Comcast Channels 98 and 902, and in Ottawa County, Oceana County, northern Muskegon County and northern Allegan County on Charter Channel 190.

== Online Radio ==
MCC Radio is an online radio station operated by the college.

== Astronomy ==
Muskegon Community College is home to the Carr-Fles Planetarium, which was completely renovated in 2012 and remains West Michigan's only free planetarium, and also owns an observatory at the Muskegon County Wastewater Treatment Facility.

== Athletics ==
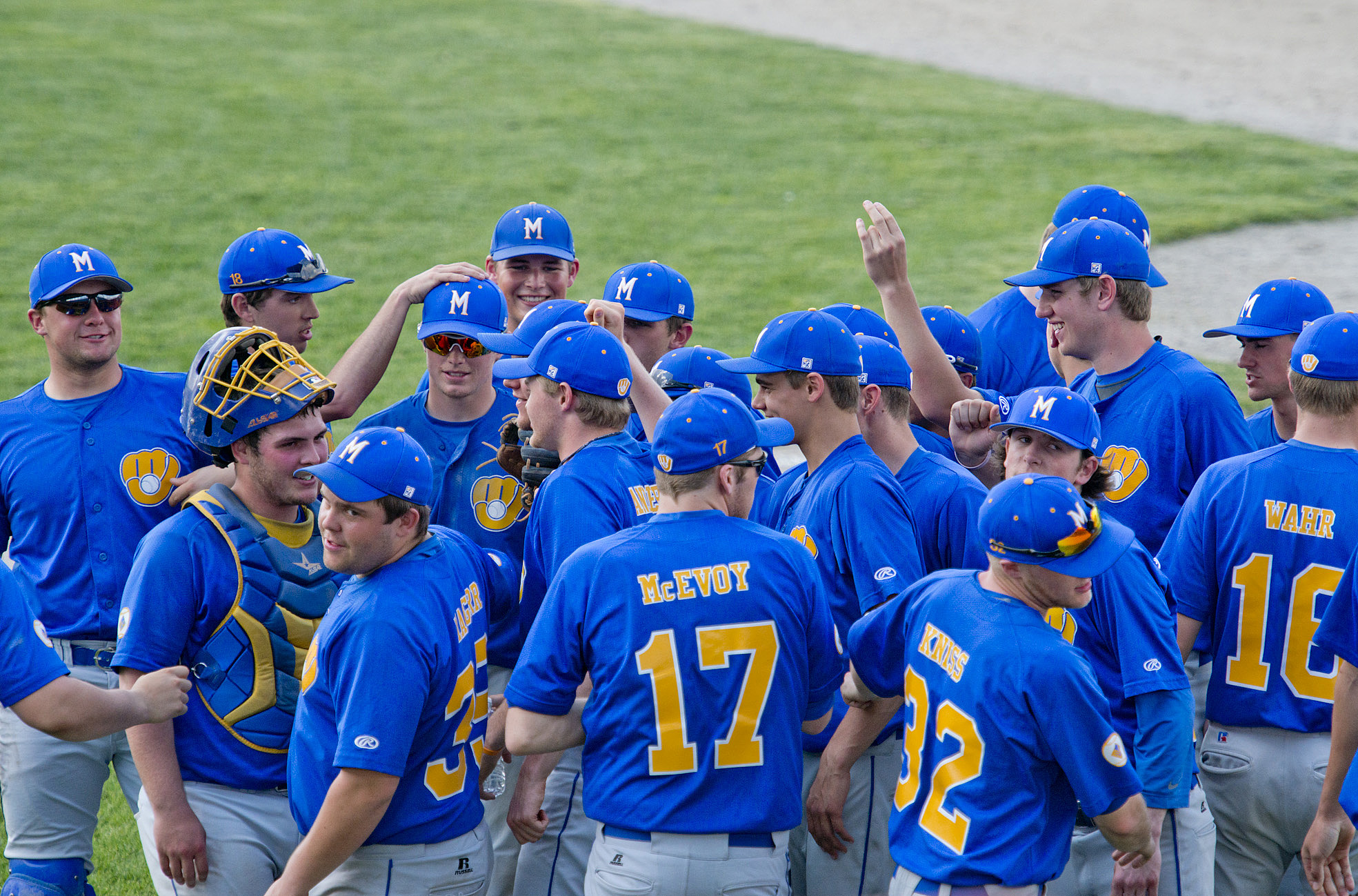
The Jayhawks baseball team at an NJCAA regional tournament in 2014

Muskegon Community College offers its students 17 intercollegiate sports, more than any other community college in the state of Michigan. The team nickname is "Jayhawks" and the school colors are Royal Blue and Gold. MCC competes in the following intercollegiate sports - Men's and Women's Basketball, Men's and Women's Soccer, Men's and Women's Cross Country, Men's and Women's Bowling, Men's and Women's Indoor Track, Men's and Women's Outdoor Track, Baseball, Softball, Women's Volleyball, Men's Golf and Wrestling. All indoor athletic events are held in the Bartels-Rode Gymnasium. Baseball and softball are played on the respective fields adjacent to the gymnasium.

MCC competes in the National Junior College Athletic Association (NJCAA) Region XII and the Michigan Community College Athletic Association (MCCAA).

National Championships:

- 1963: Men's Cross Country - NJCAA
- 1964: Men's Cross Country - NJCAA
- 1970: Wrestling - NJCAA
- 2010: Softball - NJCAA

Club Sports National Championships:

- 2003: Men's Ice Hockey - ACHA Division III

== Notable alumni ==
- Elmer L. Andersen – former Governor of Minnesota, Past President and owner of HB Fuller Company
- Garrett Børns – Musician
- Benjamin Bolger – American polymath who holds 17 degrees and claims to be the second most accredited person in modern history.
- Tony Ferguson (attended) – The Ultimate Fighter: Team Lesnar vs. Team dos Santos season 13 winner; current mixed martial artist in the Ultimate Fighting Championships Lightweight Division
- Steven Rinella (1994) – Author, travel writer and outdoor television host. His work includes The Scavenger's Guide to Haute Cuisine and American Buffalo: In Search of a Lost Icon. His writing has appeared in The New Yorker, Outside, Glamour, O, The Oprah Magazine, Petersen's Hunting, Men's Journal, Salon.com, Bowhunter, The New York Times, and the anthologies Best American Travel Writing and Best Food Writing. In 2011 he hosted the 8-part series The Wild Within on Travel Channel. He is currently the host of MeatEater, on Sportsman Channel.
- Chris Taylor (1970) – Heavyweight wrestler, National Wrestling Hall of Fame member and bronze medal winner at the 1972 Munich Games.
