= Calvin Johnson (anesthesiologist) =

American anesthesiologist

Calvin Johnson is an American anesthesiologist and professor of anesthesiology at Cedars-Sinai Medical Center in Los Angeles, California. He served as Dean of the College of Medicine at Charles R. Drew University of Medicine and Science from 2001–2002. He has been a staff anesthesiologist at Cedars-Sinai Medical Center since 2000 and has done research and clinical studies. He has advocated for COVID-19 vaccine education, especially within the Black community.

== Early life and education ==
Johnson was born and raised in Egelston Township, Muskegon, Michigan. He experienced racism as a child. He attended Oakridge High School, where he played multiple sports. He played on the varsity basketball team in 1975. He ran cross country at Oakridge, ran track and field, and played football his senior season at Oakridge. In 1977, he was a first-team Associated Press all-state basketball player and received other awards. He was named to the Western Michigan Conference All-Conference Basketball Team for two seasons from 1975 to 1977. In 2022, he was inducted into the Muskegon Area Sports Hall of Fame. He attended Dartmouth College in 1977, where he played point guard for the basketball team. Ahead of the 1980–1981, Johnson and Larry Lawrence (basketball) were named co-captains. He was voted the most valuable player in first Granite State Basketball Tournament. He was Dartmouth's second-leading scorer and ranked second in the Ivy League for assists during his senior year. He was an Academic All-American. He graduated in 1981 with a degree in biochemistry. Following the 1980–1981 basketball season, he was awarded the Alvin F. "Doggie" Julian Award.

== Medical career ==
He graduated from the Geisel School of Medicine at Dartmouth in 1985. He then completed his residency in anesthesiology at Massachusetts General Hospital, Boston Children's Hospital, and Beth Israel Deaconess Medical Center in 1989. He was Chief of Obstetrical Anesthesia at Hutzel Hospital of Wayne State University in Detroit for six years. In 1996, Johnson was appointed chairman of the Department of Anesthesiology at King/Drew Medical Center in Los Angeles. He was Dean of the College of Medicine from 2001 – 2002.

He has also been a staff anesthesiologist at Cedars-Sinai Medical Center since 2000. He has written poetry from his experiences working in trauma and general anesthesia. His experiences of racism as a child motivated him to address stereotypes and inequality in medicine. He was a member of the Cedars-Sinai Medical Center COVID-19 Airway Team and Invasive Line Placement ICU Team. He worked with the hospital's intubation team at the outset of the pandemic.

He has been an advocate for COVID-19 vaccine education, particularly within the Black community. He spoke with NPR reporter Allison Aubrey regarding vaccine hesitancy in this community during a segment that aired on Morning Edition. He argued that COVID-19 vaccines are safe and beneficial for pregnant women and their unborn babies. In a Los Angeles Sentinel editorial, he called for educating expecting mothers about the vaccine's safety.

== Personal life ==
Johnson and his wife Elaine have three children. They serve as deacons at their church South Bay Church of Christ. He and his family have participated in HOPE worldwide, an arm of the International Churches of Christ.
