= Egelston Township, Michigan =

- Township
- Location within Michigan Location within the United States
- Coordinates: 43°14′38″N 86°04′57″W
- Country: United States
- State: Michigan
- County: Muskegon

Area
  - Total: 35.8 sq mi (93 km^{2})
  - Land: 33.2 sq mi (86 km^{2})
  - Water: 2.6 sq mi (6.7 km^{2})
- Elevation: 673 ft (205 m)

Population (2020)
  - Total: 11,128
  - Density: 335.3/sq mi (129.5/km^{2})
- Time zone: UTC-5 (Eastern (EST))
  - Summer (DST): UTC-4 (EDT)
- ZIP Codes: 49442 (Muskegon); 49457 (Twin Lake); 49451 (Ravenna)
- FIPS code: 26-121-25080
- GNIS feature ID: 1626220
- Website: www.egelstontwp.org

Egelston Township is a general law township (known in other states as a civil township) of Muskegon County in the U.S. state of Michigan. As of the 2020 census, the township population was 11,128, up from 9,909 in 2010.

== History ==
Egleston Township was established in 1859.

== Geography ==
The township is in southern Muskegon County, bordered to the northeast by Newaygo County. The community of Wolf Lake is in the western part of the township. State highway M-46 crosses the southern part of the township, leading west to Muskegon, the county seat, and east to Casnovia.

According to the U.S. Census Bureau, the township has a total area of 35.8 square miles (93 km^{2}), of which 33.2 square miles (86 km^{2}) are land and 2.6 square miles (6.7 km^{2}), or 7.26%, are water. Wolf Lake, west of the center of the township, is the largest natural water body. The Muskegon River crosses the northern part of the township.

== Government ==
Egelston Township, a general law township, is run under a board system of management. Its elected officials include a Supervisor, Clerk, Treasurer and four trustees.

== Demographics ==
Historical population
Census	Pop.	Note	%±
1860	93		—
1870	233		150.5%
1880	218		−6.4%
1890	289		32.6%
1900	319		10.4%
1910	377		18.2%
1920	324		−14.1%
1930	948		192.6%
1940	1,716		81.0%
1950	3,941		129.7%
1960	6,104		54.9%
1970	6,690		9.6%
1980	7,310		9.3%
1990	7,640		4.5%
2000	9,537		24.8%
2010	9,909		3.9%
2020	11,128		12.3%
U.S. Decennial Census

As of the census of 2000, there were 9,537 people, 3,458 households, and 2,596 families residing in the township. The population density was 272.8 inhabitants per square mile (105.3/km^{2}). There were 3,643 housing units at an average density of 104.2 per square mile (40.2/km^{2}). The racial makeup of the township was 94.04% White, 1.05% African American, 1.05% Native American, 0.30% Asian, 1.48% from other races, and 2.08% from two or more races. Hispanic or Latino of any race were 3.98% of the population.

There were 3,458 households, out of which 38.4% had children under the age of 18 living with them, 57.7% were married couples living together, 12.1% had a female householder with no husband present, and 24.9% were non-families. 20.0% of all households were made up of individuals, and 8.0% had someone living alone who was 65 years of age or older. The average household size was 2.75 and the average family size was 3.14.

In the township the population was spread out, with 29.2% under the age of 18, 9.0% from 18 to 24, 29.8% from 25 to 44, 22.2% from 45 to 64, and 9.8% who were 65 years of age or older. The median age was 34 years. For every 100 females, there were 98.8 males. For every 100 females age 18 and over, there were 94.4 males.

The median income for a household in the township was $37,557, and the median income for a family was $41,810. Males had a median income of $33,140 versus $25,066 for females. The per capita income for the township was $16,489. About 6.9% of families and 8.7% of the population were below the poverty line, including 13.2% of those under age 18 and 8.5% of those age 65 or over.

== Schools ==
The Muskegon Oakridge Public Schools District serves the Egelston area and is part of the Muskegon Area Intermediate School District.

== Notable people ==
- Calvin Johnson (anesthesiologist)
