= MAISD =

MAISD may refer to

- Muskegon Area Intermediate School District
- Master of Arts in International Studies and Diplomacy
