= Whitehall High School =

Whitehall High School may refer to:

- Whitehall Senior High School, Whitehall, Michigan
- Whitehall High School (Montana), Whitehall, Montana
- Whitehall High School (Pennsylvania), Whitehall Township, Lehigh County, Pennsylvania
- Whitehall High School (Wisconsin), Whitehall, Wisconsin
- Whitehall-Yearling High School, Whitehall, Ohio
- Whitehall Junior/Senior High School, Whitehall, New York
- White Hall High School, White Hall, Arkansas
