= Oakridge Public Schools =

School district in Michigan

Address
- 275 South Wolf Lake Road Muskegon, Muskegon County, Michigan, 49442; United States

District information
- Grades: PreKindergarten–12
- Superintendent: Tom Livezey
- Schools: 4
- Budget: $32,086,000 2022–2023 expenditures
- NCES District ID: 2626220

Students and staff
- Students: 1,810 (2024–2025)
- Teachers: 105.6 (on an FTE basis) (2024–2025)
- Staff: 246.78 FTE (2024–2025)
- Student–teacher ratio: 17.14 (2024–2025)

Other information
- Website: oakridgeschools.org

Oakridge Public Schools is a public school district in West Michigan. In Muskegon County, it serves Wolf Lake, Egelston Township, and part of Cedar Creek Township. It also serves part of Bridgeton Township in Newaygo County.

== History ==
The district was formed in May 1963, when voters approved the consolidation of Bates, Carr, Jibson and Wolf Lake school districts. Initially, high school students attended Muskegon Public Schools, Orchard View Schools, and Ravenna Public Schools. Oakridge's own high school was being planned by the summer of 1964. It was dedicated on January 8, 1966.

The current Oakridge High School was completed in April 2001. It was funded by a 1997 construction bond issue that addressed overcrowding in the district. Additions were also built at other schools, and grade levels were reorganized by building. The former high school became a middle school, the middle school became an upper elementary school, and Wolf Lake Elementary became a lower elementary. Carr Elementary became a preschool and multipurpose building.

== Schools ==
Schools in Oakridge Public Schools district
School	Address	Notes
Oakridge High School	5493 East Hall Road, Muskegon	Grades 9–12. Built 2001.
Oakridge Middle School	251 S. Wolf Lake Road, Muskegon	Grades 7-8. Built 1965.
Oakridge Upper Elementary	481 S. Wolf Lake Road, Muskegon	Grades 4-6
Oakridge Lower Elementary	120 N. Park Street, Muskegon	Grades K-3
Early Childhood Center	1050 S. Carr Road, Muskegon	Preschool
