= Anthony Bradford =

American football player (born 2001)

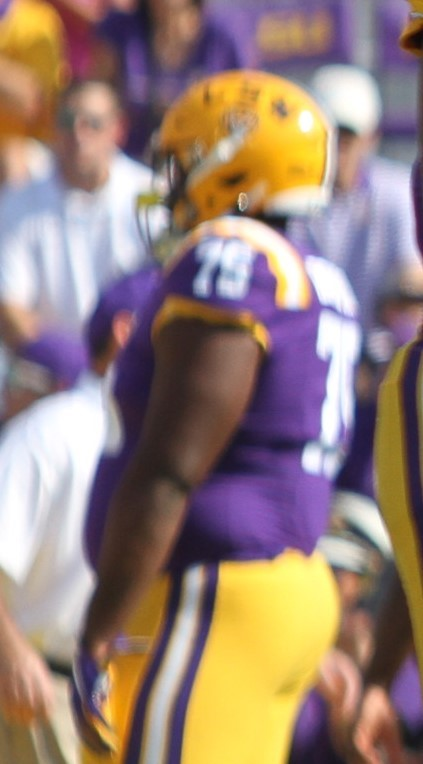
- Bradford with the LSU Tigers in 2019

No. 75 – Seattle Seahawks
- Position: Guard
- Roster status: Active

Personal information
- Born: April 28, 2001 (age 25); Muskegon, Michigan, U.S.
- Listed height: 6 ft 4 in (1.93 m)
- Listed weight: 335 lb (152 kg)

Career information
- High school: Muskegon (MI)
- College: LSU (2019–2022)
- NFL draft: 2023: 4th round, 108th overall pick

Career history
- Seattle Seahawks (2023–present)

Awards and highlights
- Super Bowl champion (LX); CFP national champion (2019)

Career NFL statistics as of Week 1, 2026
- Games played: 43
- Games started: 39
- Stats at Pro Football Reference

Anthony Bradford (born April 28, 2001) is an American professional football guard for the Seattle Seahawks of the National Football League (NFL). He played college football for the LSU Tigers.

== Early life ==
Bradford was born in Muskegon, Michigan. He attended Muskegon High School and was a highly regarded offensive lineman, helping the team win 27 consecutive games while appearing at both guard and tackle. A consensus four-star prospect, he was ranked the third-best player from Michigan according to Rivals.com, as well as the 11th-best offensive tackle nationally. Bradford received numerous NCAA FBS scholarship offers, eventually choosing to play for LSU.

== College career ==
Bradford redshirted his true freshman year in 2019, appearing in three games during LSU's national championship season. The following season, he played seven games, with the majority of his playing time coming on special teams. He began 2021 with five starts through the first six games, before an injury ended his season.

Bradford was a key figure for the team in 2022, helping them go from 6–7 the prior year to 10–4, reaching the conference championship. He appeared in 13 games, 12 of which he started, only missing their match against Mississippi State for undisclosed reasons. He appeared on a total of 899 snaps on the year and only allowed four sacks, while being called for just two penalties. Bradford's primary position during his final year of college was at right guard, where he took 736 snaps.

Bradford declared for the NFL draft following the season, and finished his stint at LSU with 29 games played, 17 of which he started at three different positions on the line.

== Professional career ==
Pre-draft measurables
Height	Weight	Arm length	Hand span	Wingspan	40-yard dash	10-yard split	20-yard split	20-yard shuttle	Three-cone drill	Vertical jump	Broad jump	Bench press
6 ft 4 in (1.93 m)	332 lb (151 kg)	33 1/2 in (0.85 m)	9 1/2 in (0.24 m)	6 ft 8 3/8 in (2.04 m)	5.08 s	1.74 s	2.85 s	4.80 s	7.84 s	30.0 in (0.76 m)	8 ft 10 in (2.69 m)	34 reps
All values from NFL Combine

Several sources projected Bradford to be selected in the 2023 NFL draft, while others gave a projection of undrafted free agent. He ended up being chosen in the fourth round (104th overall) by the Seattle Seahawks. As a rookie, he appeared in 16 games.

Bradford started all 17 starts for Seattle during the 2025 season; he also started in Super Bowl LX, a 29–13 win over the New England Patriots.

On September 23, 2026, Bradford was placed on injured reserve due to knee and hip injuries suffered in the team's season opener against the New England Patriots.
