= Ronald Johnson (wide receiver, born 1988) =

American football player (born 1988)

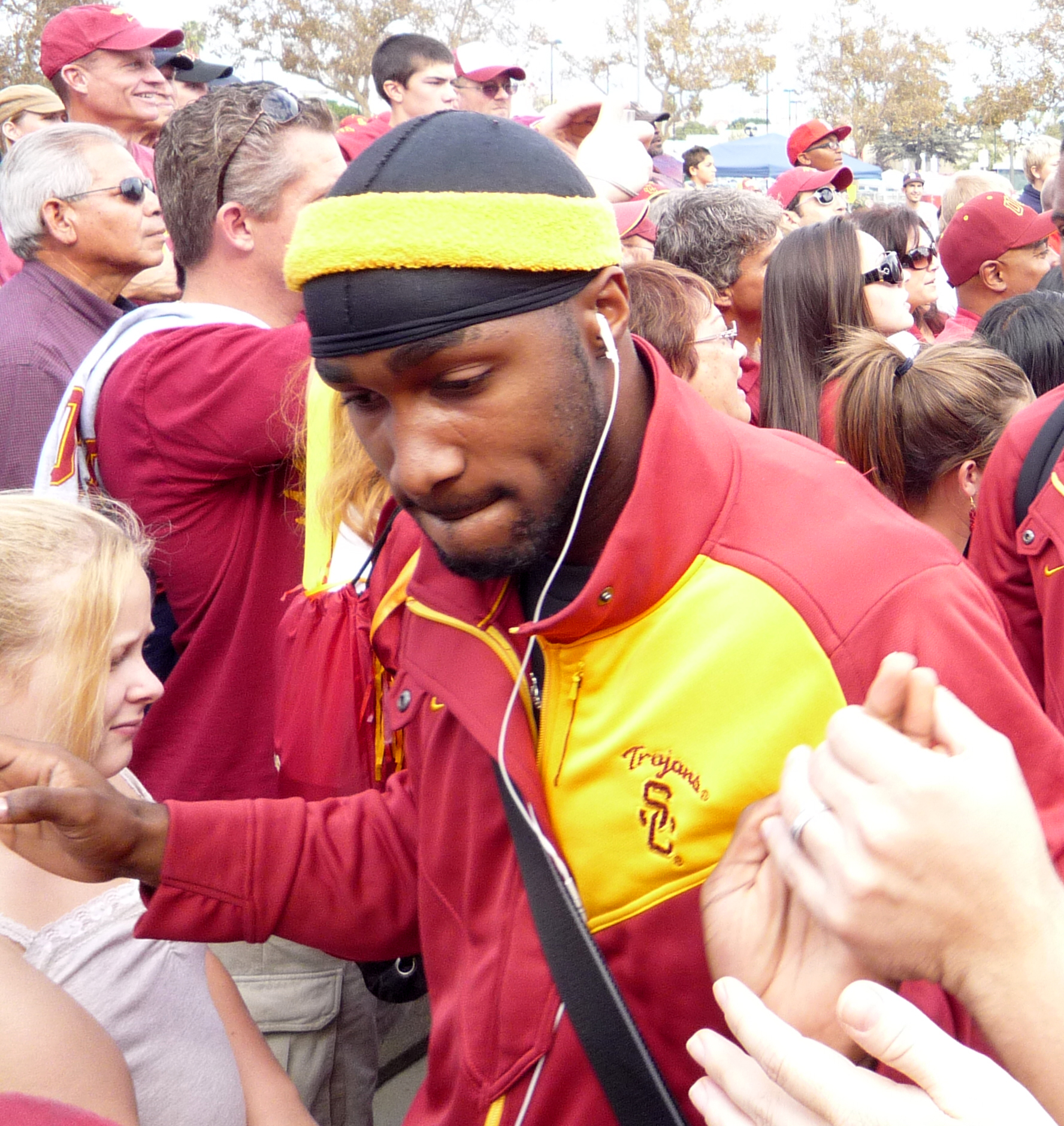
- Johnson on USC's traditional pregame "Trojan Walk".

No. 80
- Position: Wide receiver

Personal information
- Born: August 3, 1988 (age 38); Muskegon, Michigan, U.S.
- Listed height: 5 ft 10 in (1.78 m)
- Listed weight: 185 lb (84 kg)

Career information
- High school: Muskegon (MI)
- College: USC
- NFL draft: 2011: 6th round, 182nd overall pick

Career history
- San Francisco 49ers (2011)*; Philadelphia Eagles (2011−2012); Seattle Seahawks (2014)*; Toronto Argonauts (2015)*; West Michigan Ironmen (2016)
- * Offseason or practice squad member only
- Stats at Pro Football Reference

Ronald Johnson (born August 3, 1988) is an American former football player. He played college football for the USC Trojans. Johnson was selected by the San Francisco 49ers in the sixth round of the 2011 NFL draft.

== Early life ==
Johnson attended Muskegon High School in Muskegon, Michigan. He was rated as the best recruit in Michigan in the class of 2007 by Rivals.com. He had 1,600 all-purpose yards as a wide receiver on offense in 2006, including 700 receiving yards on 26 catches (26.9 avg.) with 7 touchdowns and 347 rushing yards on 30 carries (11.6 avg.) with 4 touchdowns, 180 yards on 7 kickoff returns (25.7 avg.), 218 yards on 11 punt returns (19.8 avg.), and 3 touchdowns as a cornerback. Muskegon went 14-0 and won the 2004 and 2006 State Championship. Johnson chose to attend USC after being recruited by many other top schools including Texas, Florida, Michigan, Ohio State, Michigan State, and Notre Dame.

== College career ==
Following the departures of Dwayne Jarrett and Steve Smith, Johnson made an immediate impact after arriving at USC. He joined junior Patrick Turner who was the most experienced returner at the position. Johnson has been clocked at 4.4 seconds in the 40 yard dash.

Johnson began his freshman season making several contributions. In the season opener against Idaho, he ran 4 yards on a reverse. He caught his first pass against Nebraska for 4 yards. Against Washington State, he had 5 receptions for 94 yards and 2 touchdowns and a tackle. Johnson returned 3 kickoffs for 65 yards against Washington. Against Stanford, he had a 47-yard touchdown catch, a 23-yard run off a reverse, and 3 kickoff returns for 61 yards. Johnson returned 3 kickoffs for 73 yards and a 6-yard run against Arizona. Against Notre Dame, Johnson had a 37-yard kickoff return. He returned 4 kickoffs for 96 yards and had a tackle against Oregon. Against Oregon State, he returned a kickoff for 41 yards. In one of his biggest games of the season, he returned 4 kickoffs for 102 yards against California. In another big game, Johnson had a 33-yard catch and returned 3 kickoffs for 94 yards. Against rival UCLA, he returned a kickoff for 17 yards. In the 2008 Rose Bowl, Johnson caught 2 passes for 15 yards and returned 2 kickoffs for 34 yards against Illinois.

During his sophomore season, Johnson continued to return kickoffs and remained a deep threat against opposing defenses. He ranks 13th on USC's career kickoff return chart (620 yards). In the 2009 Rose Bowl, Johnson had 4 receptions for 82 yards and 2 touchdowns. At the end of August 2009 Johnson broke his thumb in USC's mock-game scrimmage at the Coliseum.

== Professional career ==
Pre-draft measurables
Height	Weight	Arm length	Hand span	Wingspan	40-yard dash	10-yard split	20-yard split	20-yard shuttle	Three-cone drill	Vertical jump	Broad jump	Bench press
5 ft 11 1/4 in (1.81 m)	199 lb (90 kg)	30 3/4 in (0.78 m)	9 in (0.23 m)	5 ft 11 7/8 in (1.83 m)	4.45 s	1.59 s	2.65 s	4.28 s	6.64 s	37.5 in (0.95 m)	10 ft 4 in (3.15 m)	20 reps
All values from NFL Combine/Pro Day

=== San Francisco 49ers ===
Johnson was selected in the sixth round by the San Francisco 49ers with the 172nd pick in the 2011 NFL draft. He was released by the 49ers on September 3, 2011.

=== Philadelphia Eagles ===
Johnson was signed to the Philadelphia Eagles' practice squad on September 5, 2011. He was promoted to the active roster on December 31. He was not active for the final game of the season, however.

During training camp in 2012, Johnson suffered a broken and dislocated ankle in a practice. He was waived/injured on July 31, 2012, and subsequently reverted to the team's injured reserve list on August 2. He was released from his contract on April 11, 2013.

=== Seattle Seahawks ===
On July 31, 2014, Johnson was signed by the Seattle Seahawks.

=== Toronto Argonauts ===
Johnson was signed by the Toronto Argonauts of the Canadian Football League on April 9, 2015. He was released by the Argonauts on June 14, 2015.

=== West Michigan Ironmen ===
In 2016, Johnson joined the West Michigan Ironmen of American Indoor Football.
