= Seth Privacky =

American mass murderer (1980–2010)

- Privacky's mugshot, taken shortly after his arrest
- Born: Seth Stephen Privacky; 1980
- Died: July 15, 2010 (aged 30); Kincheloe, Michigan, U.S.
- Cause of death: Gunshot wounds
- Motive: Personal dispute following a threat of eviction from his parents
- Convictions: First degree murder (5 counts); Possession of a firearm while committing a felony (5 counts)
- Penalty: Life imprisonment without the possibility of parole

Details
- Date: November 29, 1998; 12:45 – 1:20 p.m. (UTC-5)
- Killed: 5
- Weapon: .22 Ruger handgun

Seth Stephen Privacky (1980 – July 15, 2010) was an American mass murderer from Muskegon, Michigan. He shot and killed his parents, brother, his brother's girlfriend, and his grandfather on November 29, 1998, at the age of 18. He pled no contest and was convicted of five counts each of first degree murder and felony firearm charges. A friend was charged with helping him dispose of the weapon and being an accessory to the crime but was acquitted. He was sentenced to life in prison without parole. He was shot and killed during a failed prison escape attempt with two other inmates at Kinross Correctional Facility on July 15, 2010.

== Early life ==
Privacky was born in 1980. At the time of the shooting, Privacky was a senior at Reeths-Puffer High School. His classmates described him as quiet and soft-spoken. His parents described him as a "good kid" in 1997, and court records showed he was a B-average student. However, a family friend stated that his father believed he was a psychopath who did not have a conscience and that his mother said he was "out of control". His mother checked a box in a 1996 court questionnaire claiming that he "sometimes" drank alcohol at 16.

The year before the shooting, in 1997, a court had ordered Privacky to attend counseling and to take the antidepressant Wellbutrin after he was arrested for stealing beer from a store he worked at and selling it to minors, and shoplifting from another store. It was not known if he had been taking the medication in the lead-up to the shooting. He was placed on probation and sentenced to 10 days in a county youth home. He completed probation.

Privacky later claimed, in a 2007 letter from prison, that he started using alcohol and marijuana at age 14, then LSD and amphetamine by the age of 16. He also claimed that he was on LSD at the time of the shooting, and afterward vomited and had suicidal thoughts after the effects had worn off. Law enforcement officials were skeptical of this claim, as he did not mention using drugs in his interrogation. He also claimed to have sold drugs and been promiscuous throughout high school. He blamed the shooting on the fact he was raised agnostic, after he converted to Christianity in prison.

Security footage showed Privacky attempting to buy .22 caliber ammunition the night before the murders. His purchase was rejected due to his age. Where he obtained the ammunition used in the shooting was not known.

== Murders ==
The murders took place over Thanksgiving weekend; the family was preparing for a delayed holiday dinner. Privacky claimed after the murders that his father threatened to kick him out, and that his father said that his parents no longer loved him. He said that he had been arguing with his father for months. His aunt later said that his car had been taken away after he received a C on his report card, which enraged him. Privacky grabbed his father's .22 Ruger handgun out of the closet and went downstairs, hiding it behind his back.

After his father left to pick up his grandfather at 12:45pm, Privacky shot his brother in the back of the head while he was watching TV, before dragging his body into the basement. He then waited for his father to return home, before ambushing him and his grandfather in the garage, shooting them both in the back of the head. A detective later said that he "shot his grandfather twice, to make sure he was dead." He then went upstairs and shot his mother, after waiting for her to get out of the shower. His brother's girlfriend, April Boss, arrived and saw the bodies, leading him to shoot her as she walked into the kitchen. All of the victims were shot once in the head, except for his grandfather, who was shot twice in the neck.

At 2pm, Privacky called a friend of his, also 18, to help him clean up the scene, and he arrived half an hour later. They wrapped the bodies in sheets and planned to bury them later. His associate disposed of the gun and magazine in a pond 10 miles away. He then returned a movie at Blockbuster, went home, and attended a church youth group. He disposed of the shell casings in a gas station trash can and went to the grocery store to get duct tape. He spent several hours mopping up blood. His associate returned to Privacky's home later that night. The bodies turned out to be too heavy for either man to carry, and they decided to arrange them so that it would look like a robbery.

They were taking several items from the house when, around midnight, Boss' parents, who had been looking for her, drove up to the house, which made him and Privacky flee into the woods. They entered the home and called the police. Shortly after the police arrived, his friend was apprehended by police using tracking dogs after being sighted running out of the woods near the crime scene. He admitted to what had happened and began cooperating with authorities. The police did not initially enter the home, fearing the killer was still inside.

A manhunt for Privacky began, and his school went on lockdown out of fear he would arrive. He hid for nearly 13 hours, ultimately being found in a barn a mile from his home, after a schoolmate who had given him a ride recognized him and tipped off the police. He said nothing after his arrest, besides requesting a lawyer. Police found bloody clothing and a stolen television in a car belonging to one of the Privackys.

== Legal proceedings ==
Privacky was jailed on US$5 million bail, and charged with five counts of open murder on December 1, 1998. His friend was held for the same amount on identical charges. He initially claimed his dead brother had committed the murders, stating that they were the result of a murder-suicide pact between them that had gone awry. He later confessed the day after the shooting. His affect after being arrested was said to be flat and emotionless, with an officer noting his demeanor was as if "nobody was home".

He pled no contest and was convicted of five counts of first degree murder and five counts of felony firearm charges. He was found guilty and sentenced to life in prison without parole on May 27, 1999. He requested he be allowed to "see the world" before he had to report to prison, which was rejected by the judge. Privacky cried after he finished giving his statement to the court. The prosecutor described the crime scene as one of the most brutal he had ever seen.

His associate's charges were later downgraded to five felony firearm charges and five counts of being an accessory to the crime. He was acquitted by a jury in November 1999, after his defense argued that he only helped Privacky due to fear for his life. A detective of the Muskegon County Sheriff's Department called the verdict a "travesty". His friend was charged several weeks after his acquittal for vandalism he had committed between his two visits to the Privacky home the day of the murders and was ordered to pay restitution after he pleaded no contest to misdemeanor property destruction.

== Prison escape attempt and death ==
On July 15, 2010, Privacky was shot and killed during a failed prison escape attempt at Kinross Correctional Facility, a low to medium-security prison in Michigan's Upper Peninsula. He had 32 prison misconducts, including ones for substance abuse, gambling, theft, and misconducts in October 2009 for possessing a weapon and for fighting the same year. He and two other inmates carjacked a correctional staff semi-truck near the prison around 9:10 a.m. (ET) and tried to drive it through the double fence, resulting in a large breach in it. All three prisoners were level two security, the minimum allowed security for prisoners serving life in prison. The truck traveled roughly 100 yards before it stopped, and all three inmates attempted to flee the truck. He ignored orders to stop running and was shot dead by a corrections officer. After he was shot, the other two inmates surrendered. He was shot in the head, the same method of death as his victims. The driver of the truck was left with superficial injuries.

The two other prisoners involved in the escape attempt, Andrew Joseph Ross and Brian Lee Davidson, were also serving sentences for murder; Ross was subsequently sentenced to life in prison. As Davidson was already serving a sentence of life imprisonment, he was not charged for the escape attempt.
