= Ingrid Olson =

American cognitive neuroscientist

- Education: University of Michigan; Yale University
- Scientific career
- Fields: Cognitive Neuroscience
- Institutions: Temple University

Ingrid Olson is an American professor, who is the Thaddeus L. Bolton Professor of Psychology and Neuroscience at Temple University in Philadelphia, Pennsylvania. At Temple University, she serves as the director of the Cognition and Neuroscience Area. She is an expert on the biological basis of human cognition, with special focus on memory and social cognition. As of 2023, she has produced around 100 scientific publications, which have been cited around 14,000 times.

== Biography ==
Ingrid Olson was born in Muskegon, Michigan. She attended Muskegon High School and did her undergraduate degree at University of Michigan. She got her PhD at Yale University and she conducted her postdoctoral research at the Yale School of Medicine.

== Research ==
Dr. Olson's graduate research was focused on visual statistical learning and visual short term memory . She published one of the first studies showing that the hippocampus plays an essential role in maintaining information over very brief delays, going against dogma that this structure was only essential for long term memory. She has also done research on how our brain remembers people and other forms of social memory and how this sort of memory can be improved by electrical stimulation of the anterior temporal lobes. Newer work, in collaboration with Nora Newcombe, has focused on how the brain matures to support episodic memory in young children. She has helped establish the fundamental role of neural white matter, such as the Fornix (neuroanatomy), Uncinate fasciculus, and Cerebellothalamic tract, in orchestrating complex cognitive processes such as episodic memory, person memory, and social cognition. Her research program is funded by grants from the National Institute of Health.
