= North Muskegon High School =

Public high school in Michigan

- 1600 Mills Ave, North Muskegon, MI 49445

Information
- Type: Public high school
- School district: North Muskegon Public Schools
- Superintendent: Curt Babcock
- Principal: Jennifer Schultz
- Teaching staff: 17.70 (FTE)
- Enrollment: 315 (2023-2024)
- Student to teacher ratio: 17.80
- Color
- Athletics conference: West Michigan Conference
- Nickname: Norsemen
- Information: (231)719-4100
- Website: https://www.nmps.net/high-school/

Student assessments
- 2021–22 school year Change vs. prior year

M-STEP 11th grade proficiency rates (Science / Social Studies)
- Advanced %: 15.8 / ≤5
- Proficient %: 25.0 / –
- PR. Proficient %: 11.8 / 52.6
- Not Proficient %: 47.4 / 6.6

Average test scores
- SAT Total: 1006.4 (▼ −26.8)

North Muskegon High School is a public high school in west Michigan. The school was founded in 1935 and is a class C size school. The small population of Elementary, Middle School, and High School student all share one building creating a tightknit community of students and staff.

The Middle School and High School share one principal (Jennifer Schultz) and many members of the faculty.

== Education ==
North Muskegon High School has a strong basic four-year college preparatory program. For students selecting other courses of study, the Career Tech Center offers a wide variety of additional classes. Prior to ninth grade, counselors meet with every student and parent to define the academic goals to be pursued during the high school years. North Muskegon High School is fully accredited by the State of Michigan and the North Central Association.

In 2010, North Muskegon High School was noted as the top performing public school in the State of Michigan by the Michigan Department of Education.

== Athletics ==
North Muskegon offers fifteen interscholastic sports at the high school level to its athletes. Boys' programs include: Football, Cross Country, Golf, Basketball, Track and Field, Baseball, Soccer, and Tennis. Girls' programs include: Basketball, Cross Country, Tennis, Soccer, Side-Line Cheerleading and Competitive Cheerleading, Volleyball, Track and Field and Softball. North Muskegon is a Division IV, Class C school and competes in the West Michigan Conference.
