= Benjamin Bolger =

American perpetual student

- Born: Benjamin Bradley Bolger; October 12, 1975 (age 51); Flint, Michigan, United States
- Education: Muskegon Community College (AA); University of Michigan (BA); Yale University; University of Oxford (MSc); University of Cambridge (MPhil); Stanford University (MA); Columbia University (MA, MSc); Harvard University (MDes, DDes); Brown University (MA); Boston College (MA); Dartmouth College (MA); Brandeis University (MA); Skidmore College (MA); Ashland University (MFA); University of Tampa (MFA); West Virginia Wesleyan College (MFA); University of Georgia (MFA); University of Pennsylvania; Georgetown University; College of William and Mary; George Washington University; Ithaca College; Cornell University

Benjamin Bolger (born 1975) is an American perpetual student who had earned 16 academic degrees as of March 2022.

== Biography ==
Benjamin Bolger was born to Donald, an engineer with General Motors, and Loretta, a schoolteacher, and was raised in Grand Haven, Michigan. At the age of two, his parents were both seriously injured when the family was involved in a near-fatal car accident caused by a drunk driver; Bolger says that this encouraged him to make the most out of his life.

In first grade, he was diagnosed with dyslexia. Special education programs did not help him, and, in fourth grade, his mother began home-schooling Bolger, while undergoing a divorce. At the age of 12, Bolger began taking classes at Muskegon Community College, graduating with an A.A. by the age of 17. He then transferred with those credits to the University of Michigan, majored in sociology, and graduated summa cum laude with a 4.0 grade point average. From there, he took an internship with the Clinton Administration with Press Secretary Mike McCurry. Bolger's mother moved with him to each college and university that he attended and helped him by reading his assignments to him aloud.

In 1995, when Bolger was 19, he entered Yale Law School to study for a JD, but dropped out when he was unable to compensate for his dyslexia. After receiving additional training for his dyslexia, he enrolled at Oxford University, thus beginning his quest for degrees. His mother accompanied and supported him through much of his education to help with his work, from Ann Arbor to Oxford.

After accumulating several master's degrees, he received his first doctorate in 2008 at the age of 33, from the Harvard Graduate School of Design.

He has also studied, but did not ultimately complete graduate degrees at the University of Pennsylvania, Georgetown University, and in 2004 at Boston College's Lynch School of Education towards an MA in higher education.

Bolger worked as a visiting professor at the College of William and Mary.

As of 2022, he was working remotely toward a 17th degree, in writing performance, from the University of Cambridge in England.

== Degrees ==
- 1992 – Muskegon Community College (Associate of Arts)
- 1994 – University of Michigan (Bachelor of Arts in sociology)
- 1997 – University of Oxford (Master of Science in sociology)
- 1998 – University of Cambridge (Master of Philosophy in sociology and politics of modern society)
- 2000 – Stanford University (Master of Arts in education)
- 2001 – Teachers College, Columbia University (Master of Arts in politics of education)
- 2002 – Columbia University, Graduate School of Architecture, Planning and Preservation (Master of Science in real estate development)
- 2002 – Harvard University (Master of Design in urban planning and real estate)
- 2004 – Brown University, Watson Institute for International and Public Affairs (Master of Arts in developmental studies)
- 2004 – Dartmouth College (Master of Arts in Liberal Studies) (liberal arts)
- 2007 – Brandeis University (Master of Arts in coexistence and conflict)
- 2007 – Skidmore College (Master of Arts in Humanities)
- 2008 – Harvard University (Doctor of Design in urban planning and real estate)
- 2014 – Ashland University (Master of Fine Arts in creative writing)
- 2016 - University of Tampa (Master of Fine Arts in creative writing)
- 2016 - West Virginia Wesleyan College (Master of Fine Arts in nonfiction)
- 2017 - University of Georgia (Master of Fine Arts in screenwriting)

== Personal life ==
Bolger endeavors to sleep only 4–5 hours a night. He has two children, a daughter and a son, both of whom are home-schooled. Bolger has an extensive photograph collection with "compelling and controversial" public figures.

Bolger was featured on the Jersey Shore: Family Vacation Season 8, Episode 23 entitled "Back to School".

Bolger was featured on a September 2026 episode of Sideways hosted by Matthew Syed on BBC Radio 4 .
