= Muskegon Area Intermediate School District =

School district in Michigan, United States

MAISD logo

The Muskegon Area Intermediate School District serves the educational needs of school districts in Muskegon County, Michigan.

== School districts ==
- Fruitport Community Schools
- Holton Public Schools
- Mona Shores Public Schools
- Montague Area Public Schools
- Muskegon Heights Public Schools
- Muskegon Public Schools
- North Muskegon Public Schools
- Oakridge Public Schools
- Orchard View Schools
- Ravenna District Schools
- Reeths-Puffer Public Schools
- Whitehall District Schools

== Charter schools ==
- Three Oaks Academy
- Timberland Academy
- WayPoint Academy (Closed in 2013)

== Non-public schools ==
- Calvary Christian School
- Catholic Schools of Greater Muskegon
- Grace Christian Academy
- Michigan Dunes Montessori
- Muskegon Christian School
- St. Catherine's School
- Seventh Day Adventist School
- Western Michigan Christian High School
- West Shore Lutheran
