= Muskegon High School =

High school in Muskegon, Michigan

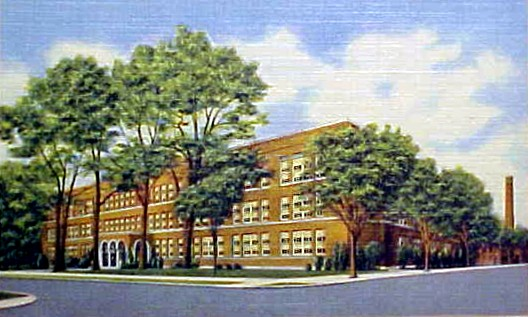
- The building in 1927

Location
- 80 West Southern Avenue; Muskegon, Michigan 49441; United States; 43°13′29″N 86°14′46″W

Information
- School type: Public high school
- Motto: Home of the Big Reds
- Established: 1872
- School district: Muskegon Public Schools
- Superintendent: Matthew Cortez
- Principal: Tim Hoffman
- Teaching staff: 45.10 (on FTE basis)
- Grades: 9-12
- Enrollment: 1,003 (2024–2025)
- Student to teacher ratio: 22.24
- Campus type: Urban
- Colors: Cardinal and white
- Athletics conference: OK Green, MHSAA Class A. Past conferences: Southwestern Conference 1930-1957; Lake Michigan Athletic Conference 1961-1984.
- Sports: Home football games played at Hackley Stadium; Baseball played at Marsh Field; Track at Muskegon Middle School; Soccer at Nelson Elementary
- Nickname: Big Reds
- Newspaper: Campus Keyhole
- Yearbook: Said and Done
- Website: School website

Student assessments
- 2021–22 school year Change vs. prior year

M-STEP 11th grade proficiency rates (Science / Social Studies)
- Advanced %: ≤5 / ≤5
- Proficient %: – / –
- PR. Proficient %: 15.4 / 62.4
- Not Proficient %: 69.1 / 16.8

Average test scores
- SAT Total: 828.6 (▼ −13.1)

Muskegon High School is a public high school located in Muskegon, Michigan, and was the first high school in Muskegon County, Michigan.

== History ==
The Class of 1875, consisting of two girls, was the first from Muskegon High School. Records show there were 102 students enrolled at the high school, and it employed three teachers.

On December 14, 1890, a fire completely destroyed the central school. The loss was serious, as the building accommodated 700 students. Following the disaster, local lumber baron Charles Hackley (January 3, 1837 – January 10, 1905) offered to furnish money to build two new schools. One, a new high school located on Jefferson at Washington Avenue, opened in September 1893. The second, the Hackley School, rose on the site of the original central school. In 1895, Hackley followed that pledge with money to build a manual training school, designed to provide training for pupils seeking education in the industrial arts. Opened in 1897, it was one of the first in the nation. For many years, an open house was held in June, allowing citizens to admire the work of the students in woodworking, drafting, foundry, printing and pattern-making.

In 1902, a gymnasium featuring a swimming pool opened on the high school campus, and an adjoining tract was purchased for use as an athletic field. The site, designed by athletic director and coach Robert Zuppke, debuted in 1907.

A new high school, built to the south of the old high school, was opened in September 1926. The old school was rechristened Central Junior High School. The closing of portions of two city streets created a central campus.

One of the first student projects of 1926 was a student-led bond drive to raise funds to build a stadium to the east of Hackley Field. Opened in the fall of 1927, Hackley Stadium continues to serve the district.

On October 21, 1929, a bronze sculpture honoring Hackley was unveiled on the Muskegon High School campus. Alma Mater by Lorado Taft features a central figure, Athena, the goddess of learning. She holds the torch of knowledge and shelters the spark of learning. Hackley's profile is carved in the stone beneath. Stone benches flank the sculpture. On the right side of the memorial is a relief of Mercury, the god of commerce, designed to symbolize Hackley's connections to industry. To the left is carved the Good Samaritan, the symbol of charity, meant to represent Hackley's role as benefactor to the school district and the city he loved.

Muskegon High School's band program earned national recognition under the guidance of William Stewart, who arrived as a teacher in 1936. Stewart's bands were invited to perform several times at the Midwest Clinic in Chicago, and in 1957 the national publication First Chair of America featured the members of the Muskegon Band and dedicated the issue to them.

The school has published an annual since 1894. Originally known as The Hyperion, it has been named Said and Done since the 1910s. The school newspaper is known as The Campus Keyhole.

The Hackley Manual Training School was torn down in 1962 as the expense to bring the building up to modern safety standards were deemed excessive.

In 1978, a two-story addition was added to the school. Featuring the C. Leo Redmond/Harry E. Potter gymnasium and Frank DeYoe library, the facility also features a weight room, Olympic-sized swimming pool, athletic offices and classrooms.

The Native American symbols used as a logo and mascot were discontinued following the 2002–03 school year. They were replaced by a stylistic block M, with origins dating back to the early 1900s.

In 2009–10, Muskegon High School began offering students IB Diploma Programme, a college preparatory course of study for highly motivated high school students.

== Athletics ==
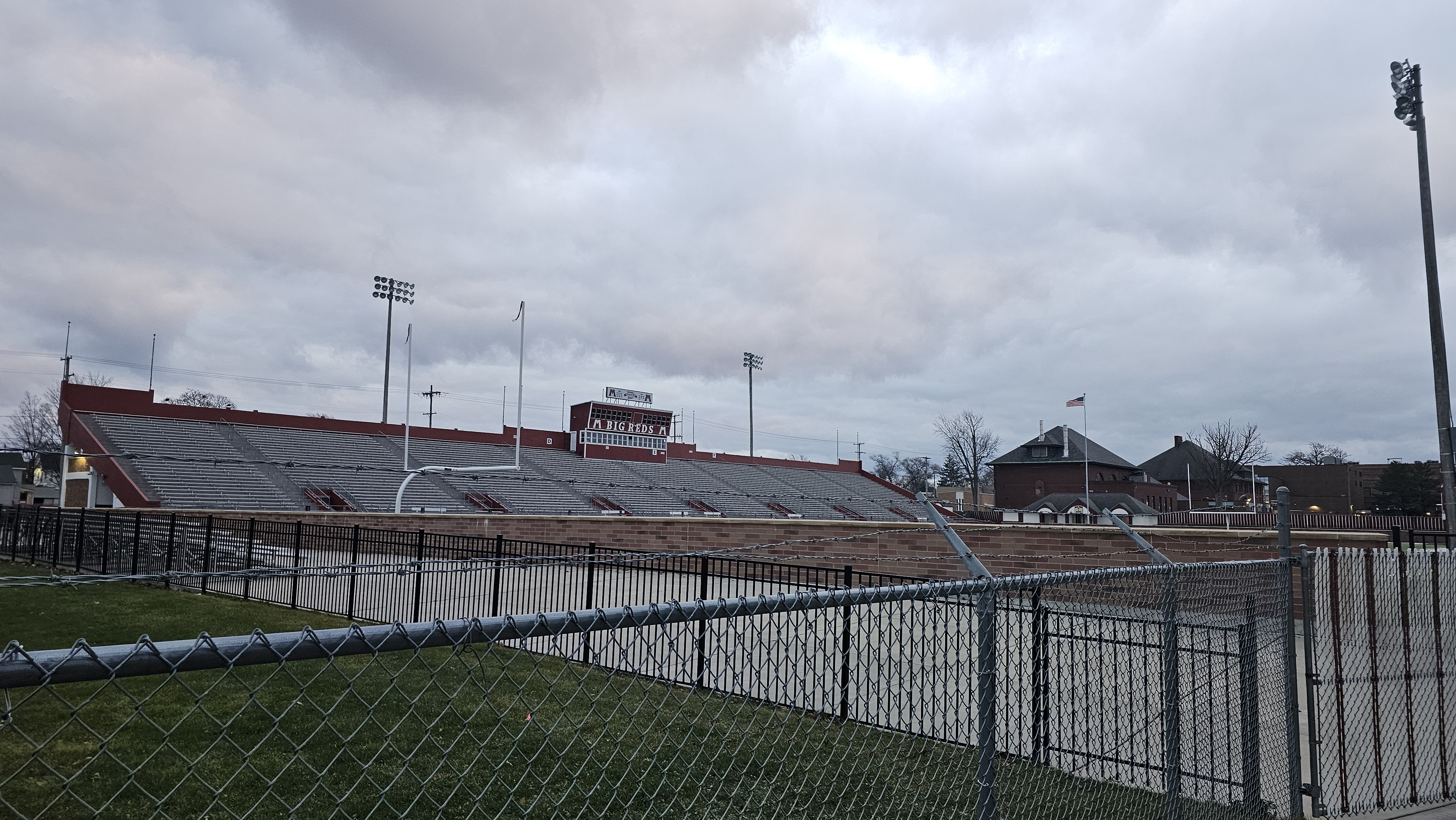
Hackley Stadium in December 2023

Muskegon High School is a member of the OK Green and the Michigan High School Athletic Association (MHSAA). The athletic teams are known as the Big Reds. The school colors are cardinal and white. Its football team is notable for its excellence, having the most wins of any team in the state of Michigan. Its sports teams include:

- Baseball (boys)
- Basketball (girls and boys)
  - Boys state champions - 1927, 1937, 2014
- Bowling (girls and boys)
- Competitive cheer (girls)
- Cross country (girls and boys)
- Football (boys)
  - State champions - 1986, 1989, 2004, 2006, 2008, 2017, 2023
- Soccer (girls and boys)
- Softball (girls)
- Track and field (girls and boys)
- Volleyball (girls)
- Wrestling (boys)

== Notable alumni ==
=== Athletics ===
- Anthony Bradford - Football
- Deyonta Davis - Basketball
- Ronald Johnson - USC/NFL football
- Earl Morrall - MSU/NFL football
- Ray Newman - MLB pitcher
- Bennie Oosterbaan - U of M football/Basketball, Mr Basketball Winner
- Kalil Pimpleton - NFL wide receiver
- Terrance Taylor - U of M/NFL football
- Cameron Martinez - Football
- DeMetrius Harris - Football
- Tovales Allaway -Football/Basketball

=== Business ===
- Roy Roberts - Vice president, General Motors
- Gerry Teifer - Former President and General manager of RCA Music Publishing

=== Politics ===
- Elmer L. Andersen - Governor of Minnesota
- Richard Mell - Chicago City Council

=== Science and Technology ===
- Ingrid Olson - neuroscientist

=== Arts and entertainment ===
- Jim Bakker - Televanglist
- Quincy Isaiah - Actor
- Harry Morgan - Actor
- John Frederick Nims - Poet
- Bill Szymczyk - Music Producer
- Richard Versalle - New York Metropolitan Opera
