= North Muskegon Public Schools =

School district

Address
- 1600 Mills Avenue North Muskegon, Muskegon County, Michigan, 49445; United States

District information
- Grades: PreKindergarten–12
- Superintendent: Curt Babcock
- Schools: 3
- Budget: $14,457,000 2022-2023 expenditures
- NCES District ID: 2625800

Students and staff
- Students: 923 (2024-2025)
- Teachers: 58.94 (on an FTE basis) (2024-2025)
- Staff: 105.04 FTE (2024-2025)
- Student–teacher ratio: 15.66 (2024-2025)

Other information
- Website: www.nmps.net

North Muskegon Public Schools is a public school district in West Michigan. It serves North Muskegon. It is a constituent of the Muskegon Area Intermediate School District in Muskegon County.

In 2010, North Muskegon High School was noted as the top performing public school in the State of Michigan by the state Department of Education.

== History ==
North Muskegon High School was built in 1935 and was known as the Frank E. McKee School. An elementary school addition was built in 1950. The high school gymnasium, known as the "Old Barn," due to its distinctive wood beams, was built around 1957. Several additions and renovations were built in 1998.

== Schools ==
The district's elementary school, middle school, and high school are all situated in one building located at 1600 Mills in North Muskegon.
