= Wolf Lake, Michigan =

- Census-designated place
- Location in Muskegon County and the state of Michigan
- Coordinates: 43°15′17″N 86°6′35″W
- Country: United States
- State: Michigan
- County: Muskegon
- Township: Egelston

Area
  - Total: 3.92 sq mi (10.16 km^{2})
  - Land: 3.54 sq mi (9.18 km^{2})
  - Water: 0.38 sq mi (0.98 km^{2})
- Elevation: 673 ft (205 m)

Population (2020)
  - Total: 5,034
  - Density: 1,420.6/sq mi (548.51/km^{2})
- Time zone: UTC-5 (Eastern (EST))
  - Summer (DST): UTC-4 (EDT)
- ZIP code: 49442 (Muskegon)
- FIPS code: 26-88220
- GNIS feature ID: 1622197

Wolf Lake is an unincorporated community and census-designated place (CDP) in Muskegon County in the U.S. state of Michigan. At the 2020 census, the population of Wolf Lake was 5,034, up from 4,104 in 2010. As an unincorporated community, Wolf Lake is governed by Egelston Township.

== Geography ==
Wolf Lake is in central Muskegon County, in the western part of Egelston Township. It is 8 miles (13 km) east of downtown Muskegon. According to the U.S. Census Bureau, the community has a total area of 3.92 square miles (10.2 km^{2}), of which 3.54 square miles (9.2 km^{2}) are land and 0.38 square miles (0.98 km^{2}), or 9.66%, are water. Wolf Lake, the community's namesake, is a natural lake in the northern part of the CDP.

=== Major highways ===
- M-46 is an east–west state trunkline highway that passes through the southern part of the community. The highway, which is one of the longest in the state, is considered a "trans-peninsular" highway, as it runs from Muskegon, on Lake Michigan, to Port Sanilac, on Lake Huron.

== Demographics ==
Historical population
Census	Pop.	Note	%±
1950	1,591		—
1960	2,525		58.7%
1970	2,258		−10.6%
1980	3,876		71.7%
1990	4,110		6.0%
2000	4,455		8.4%
2010	4,104		−7.9%
2020	5,034		22.7%
U.S. Decennial Census

=== 2020 census ===
As of the 2020 census, Wolf Lake had a population of 5,034. The median age was 34.8 years. 27.2% of residents were under the age of 18 and 13.4% of residents were 65 years of age or older. For every 100 females there were 99.9 males, and for every 100 females age 18 and over there were 96.7 males age 18 and over.

96.7% of residents lived in urban areas, while 3.3% lived in rural areas.

There were 1,806 households in Wolf Lake, of which 38.7% had children under the age of 18 living in them. Of all households, 41.7% were married-couple households, 18.5% were households with a male householder and no spouse or partner present, and 26.0% were households with a female householder and no spouse or partner present. About 22.7% of all households were made up of individuals and 9.9% had someone living alone who was 65 years of age or older.

There were 1,925 housing units, of which 6.2% were vacant. The homeowner vacancy rate was 1.1% and the rental vacancy rate was 6.0%.

Racial composition as of the 2020 census
Race	Number	Percent
White	4,334	86.1%
Black or African American	98	1.9%
American Indian and Alaska Native	59	1.2%
Asian	10	0.2%
Native Hawaiian and Other Pacific Islander	2	0.0%
Some other race	100	2.0%
Two or more races	431	8.6%
Hispanic or Latino (of any race)	329	6.5%

=== 2000 census ===
As of the 2000 census, there were 4,455 people, 1,670 households, and 1,202 families residing in the community. The population density was 1,279.0 inhabitants per square mile (493.8/km^{2}). There were 1,761 housing units at an average density of 505.6 per square mile (195.2/km^{2}). The racial makeup of the community was 94.30% White, 1.03% African American, 1.23% Native American, 0.09% Asian, 1.41% from other races, and 1.93% from two or more races. Hispanic or Latino of any race were 4.22% of the population.

There were 1,670 households, out of which 36.3% had children under the age of 18 living with them, 53.9% were married couples living together, 12.8% had a female householder with no husband present, and 28.0% were non-families. 22.5% of all households were made up of individuals, and 10.1% had someone living alone who was 65 years of age or older. The average household size was 2.66 and the average family size was 3.10.

In the community, the population was spread out, with 27.9% under the age of 18, 9.5% from 18 to 24, 29.0% from 25 to 44, 22.3% from 45 to 64, and 11.2% who were 65 years of age or older. The median age was 34 years. For every 100 females, there were 96.6 males. For every 100 females age 18 and over, there were 94.0 males.

The median income for a household in the community was $34,799, and the median income for a family was $37,847. Males had a median income of $32,197 versus $25,272 for females. The per capita income for the community was $16,214. About 6.1% of families and 8.1% of the population were below the poverty line, including 12.5% of those under age 18 and 7.8% of those age 65 or over.
