= Reeths-Puffer Schools =

School district in Michigan

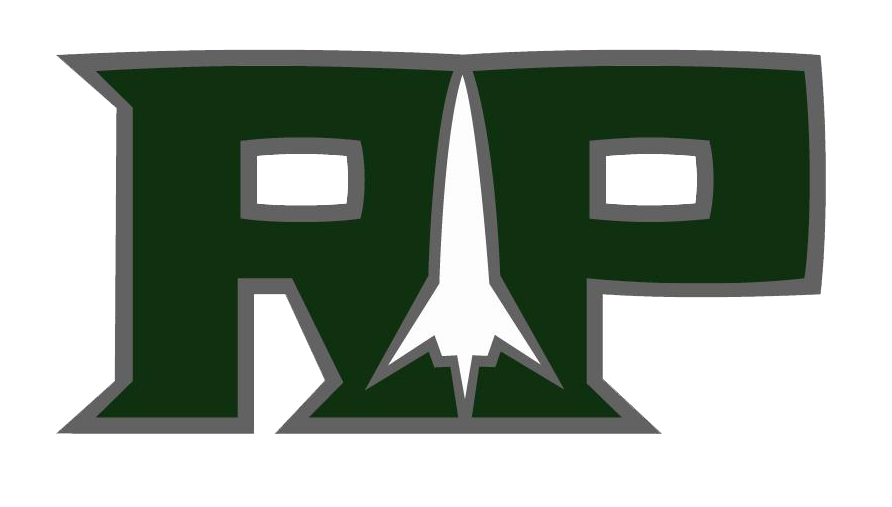

Address
- 991 W. Giles Road Muskegon, Muskegon County, Michigan, 49445; United States

District information
- Motto: A great place to learn, contribute and compete
- Grades: Pre-Kindergarten-12
- Established: 1946; 80 years ago
- Superintendent: Steve Edwards
- Schools: 7
- Budget: $52,255,000 2022-2023 expenditures
- NCES District ID: 2629540

Students and staff
- Students: 3,451 (2024-2025)
- Teachers: 202.3 (on an FTE basis) (2024-2025)
- Staff: 484.18 FTE (2024-2025)
- Student–teacher ratio: 17.06 (2024-2025)
- District mascot: Rockets
- Colors: Green & White

Other information
- Website: www.reeths-puffer.org

The Reeths-Puffer Schools is a public school district located in Muskegon Township, Michigan. It serves much of north-central Muskegon County, including the northern portion of Muskegon Township and most of Dalton, Laketon and Fruitland townships.

== History ==
=== 1870 to 1970 ===
The name of the district is taken from two separate school districts that later merged; named for Mr. Hiram Puffer, who founded the first school in the area in the 1870s, and Mr. Charles Reeths. The first school building that was part of what would eventually become the Puffer School district was built in the 1870s by Hiram Puffer who then taught at the school.

In 1925, the original Puffer school was replaced by a brick building. Two additional schools, the Pillon and Baxter School buildings, were built in the early 1900s.

In 1903, children began being taught in a new building that was named the Reeths School in honor of Charles Reeths, who served on the school board and had 11 children who attended the district.

The Reeths District continued to expand and on November 29, 1946, the Reeths and Puffer districts merged. A new junior high building was dedicated in 1956, although high school students still attended other districts' high schools until 1958, when a high school wing was added to the junior high.

Baker school district consolidated with Reeths-Puffer in 1963 and Laketon school district consolidated with it the next year. Laketon had recently completed a new junior high school, in 1960, location of the current Reeths-Puffer Middle School. Two more consolidations brought the district to its current boundaries: Twin Lake in 1966 and Duck Creek in 1981.

=== 1970 to present ===
In the late 1980s, enrollment increased dramatically and the district was crowded. A millage increase to fund construction of a new high school failed in 1989. Taking an incremental approach, the district proposed a new academic building near the high school that could be expanded later into a comprehensive high school. In April 1992, voters approved the funding to build it, the first phase of the current high school. It was planned to open in fall 1994.

In March 1995, voters approved funding to complete the high school. Students took classes in both the old and current high school until space was completed to house all students, in fall 1996. Once the academic areas were completed, the builders would finish the 900-seat auditorium and 3,000-seat gymnasium.

Reeths-Puffer Intermediate School was established in fall 1998 in the former high school building.

== Schools ==
List of schools in Reeths-Puffer Schools district
School	Address	Notes
Reeths-Puffer High School	1545 North Roberts Road, Muskegon	Grades 9-12
Reeths-Puffer Middle School	1911 West Giles Road, Muskegon	Grades 7-8
Reeths-Puffer Intermediate School	1500 North Getty Street, Muskegon	Grades 5-6
Central Elementary School	1807 West Giles Road, Muskegon	Grades K-4
Pennsylvania Elementary	2500 Pennsylvania, Muskegon	Kindergarten
Reeths-Puffer Elementary School	874 E. Giles Road, Muskegon	Grades K-4
Twin Lake Elementary School	3175 Fifth Street, Twin Lake, MI 49457	Grades K-4
McMillan Early Childhood Center	2885 Hyde Park Road, Muskegon	Preschool

== Fine Arts ==
The Reeths-Puffer High School marching band has a history of success as a competitive ensemble in the state of Michigan while also maintaining success on the national level. The band competes within the Michigan Competing Bands Association where they hold 18 state championship titles; as well as Bands of America at regional and national contests.

Reeths-Puffer High School is also home to a successful varsity winter guard team that competes in class Scholastic A at Winter Guard International contests as well as Michigan Color Guard Circuit events.

== Notable alumni ==
- Scott Goudie, actor and author
- Mark Grimmette, Olympic and World Championship luger
- Mark Hughes, professional basketball player, coach and administrator
- Rocky Marquette, actor
- Seth Privacky, mass murderer
- Matt Timme, former basketball player at SMU, father of current Gonzaga basketball player Drew Timme
