= Allison Aubrey =

American journalist

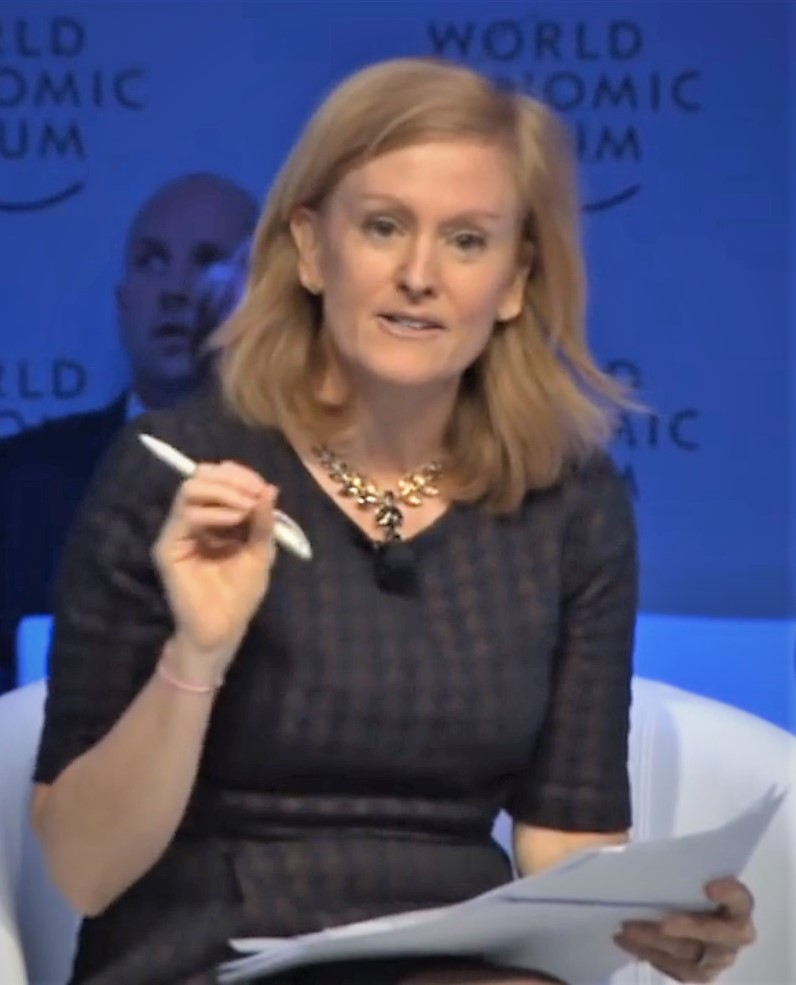
- Aubrey at the 2017 World Economic Forum
- Education: Denison University; Georgetown University
- Occupation: Journalist
- Employer: NPR
- Children: 3
- Awards: James Beard Award

Allison Aubrey is an American journalist. She is an NPR correspondent, a contributor to CBS Sunday Morning, PBS NewsHour, and a frequent conference moderator. She's the recipient of numerous awards including a New York Press Club Award, a National Press Club award, a Gracie Award and a James Beard Award winner.

== Early life ==
Aubrey earned a BA from Denison University in Granville, Ohio, and an MA from Georgetown University in Washington, D.C. She was a Knight Science Journalism fellow at the Massachusetts Institute of Technology and a Kaiser Media Fellow 2010.

== Career ==
Early in her career Aubrey was a reporter for PBS NewsHour and a producer for C-SPAN's Presidential election coverage.

Aubrey began working at NPR in 2003 as a general assignment reporter. Her stories air on NPR programs Morning Edition and All Things Considered. She has been a guest host of Weekend All Things Considered and The Diane Rehm show. She hosted NPR's video series Tiny Desk Kitchen and is one of the hosts of Life Kit. With CBS colleagues, she was awarded the 2020 New York Press Club award for Consumer Reporting in the TV category. She won a 2018 James Beard Award for reporting on Food As Medicine. At the 2016 James Beard Foundation Media Awards, Aubrey won the James Beard Award for Television Segment for a PBS NewsHour stories on food waste. In 2012, Aubrey and colleagues at NPR's food blog The Salt won the foundation's award for Best Food Blog.

She is a frequent moderator including at the World Economic Forum in Davos, The Milken Global Summit in Beverly Hills, CA, The Consumer Federation of America National Food Policy Conference, Food Tank conferences and The Chicago Council on Global Affairs, Global Food Security Symposium, and Aspen Institute.

She has reported more than 200 stories on the global pandemic, interviewing dozens of COVID-19 experts and doctors including Atul Gawande for a CBS story on mass vaccination sites, Scott Gottlieb, Janet Woodcock, Francis Collins, Stephen Hoge and Stéphane Bancel for a CBS story on the future of mRNA vaccines. Her consumer health stories have been picked up widely by Apple News and other outlets.

== Personal life ==
Aubrey has three children.
