= Muskegon Public Schools =

School district in Michigan

Address
- 1458 5th Street Muskegon, Muskegon County, Michigan, 49441; United States

District information
- Grades: PreK-12
- Superintendent: Matthew Cortez
- Schools: 7
- Budget: US$105,971,000 (2022–23 expenditures)
- NCES District ID: 2624840

Students and staff
- Students: 3,371 (2024–2025)
- Teachers: 183.42 FTE (2024–25)
- Staff: 544.27 FTE (2024–2025)
- Student–teacher ratio: 18.38 (2024–25)

Other information
- Website: muskegonpublicschools.org

Muskegon Public Schools (also known as City of Muskegon Public Schools) is a public school district in Muskegon County, Michigan. It serves most of the city of Muskegon and small parts of Norton Shores and Muskegon Township.

== History ==
The first school in Muskegon was built in 1849 and had two classrooms. The city grew rapidly in the 1880s due to lumbering in the region. In 1883, there were five brick school buildings, four wooden school buildings, 47 teachers and 2,656 students in the district. Four years later, there were 80 teachers and 4,056 students. By 1937, there were 17 schools and more than 10,000 students.

Muskegon High School graduated its first consecutive class in 1875. The high school operated within the following buildings:

- 1875-1890: Central School, located on Webster Avenue between Third and Fourth Streets. It was destroyed by fire in 1890.
- 1893-1926: Lumber baron Charles Hackley helped fund a replacement high school on Jefferson at Washington Avenue. He also built the Hackley Manual Training School, which opened in 1897. It included a gym and swimming pool for high school students' use.
- 1926: The present high school opened and the former high school became a junior high.

In 1962, the Manual Training School was demolished, followed by the 1893 high school in 1968. This created space for several new additions to the high school.

Enrollment in the district in the 2023-2024 school year was less than half of what it was during the 1999-2000 school year. In 2020, voters passed two bond issues, totaling $104.78 million, to build a new school and improve schools in the district. In fall 2024, the $35 million Charles Hackley Middle School opened. The school features gender-neutral restrooms, which have a central hand-washing area surrounded by individual enclosed toilet rooms. Muskegon superintendent Matthew Cortez stated the school is the first in Michigan with this type of restroom.

== Schools ==
List of Schools in Muskegon Public Schools district
School	Address	Notes
Bunker Elementary	2312 Denmark Street, Muskegon	Grades K-5
Marquette Elementary	480 Bennett St, Muskegon	Grades K-5
Oakview Elementary	1420 Madison Street, Muskegon	Grades K-5
Charles Hackley Middle School	180 E. Laketon Ave, Muskegon	Grades 6-8. Built 2024.
Muskegon High School	80 W. Southern Avenue	Grades 9-12. Built 1926.
Muskegon Community Education Center	1826 Hoyt Street, Muskegon	Grades 9-12.
Muskegon Early Childhood Center	2312 Denmark Street, Muskegon	Preschool housed within Bunker Elementary.
Glenside Elementary	1213 W. Hackley Ave., Muskegon	During the 2024-2025 school year, houses Two-Way Immersion (TWI), a Spanish/English immersion program
