= Whitehall District Schools =

School district in Michigan

Address
- 541 E. Slocum Street Whitehall, Muskegon County, Michigan, 49461; United States

District information
- Grades: Pre-Kindergarten-12
- Superintendent: CJ Van Wieren
- Schools: 5
- Budget: $38,320,000 2022-2023 expenditures
- NCES District ID: 2636300

Students and staff
- Students: 1,941 (2024-2025)
- Teachers: 132.24 (on an FTE basis) (2024-2025)
- Staff: 365.99 FTE (2024-2025)
- Student–teacher ratio: 14.68 (2024-2025)

Other information
- Website: www.whitehallschools.net

Whitehall District Schools is a public school district in Muskegon County, Michigan. It serves Whitehall, Lakewood Club, and parts of the townships of Blue Lake, Fruitland, Dalton, and Whitehall. It is a member of the Muskegon Area Intermediate School District.

== History ==
It is unclear when the first schoolhouse in Whitehall was built, but in 1867 a second school was built. It had a capacity of 50 students. In 1870, the students were separated into grades: Primary, Grammar, and High School. The district was officially established in 1877, the likely date of construction of the school at the corner of Livingston and Sophia that would serve the community until 1954. A gymnasium was built along Livingston Street in 1925.

In 1920, the Klett School District, in an outlying area, consolidated with the Whitehall district. The district had to provide transportation to the Klett students, and hired its first school bus driver, who provided his own bus. By 1951, the district owned ten school buses.

Around 1946, the school districts of Conklin, Lakewood, White Lake, Whitehall and Wilson consolidated to form the Whitehall Rural Agricultural School District. A new elementary school was built in 1950.

A new high school was built in 1954, which is currently the middle school. It was also known as White Lake Central High School. This school complex was expanded in 1960 with a new high school north of the 1954 high school.

In 1960, a racial controversy surrounded the high school’s annual minstrel show after Black residents, organized by the Muskegon Urban League, objected to its use of blackface and degrading racial caricature. Between 1948 and 1960, parents of high school band and choir students had organized the show each year to raise money for the arts programs. Black residents complained that the student performers' use of blackface and dialect was offensive to Black people. Objections were made by telephone and in person at the auditions, leading the parents' association to vote to cancel the show.

The high school from the late 1800s was torn down in 1960, but the 1925 gymnasium was spared to be used as a bus garage and is still extant. Its 2,000 pound bell, cast in 1883, was returned to the school district grounds in 1977 to mark the district's one hundredth anniversary.

The current high school opened in 2004. The Viking Athletic Complex, a fieldhouse with an artificial turf field, opened in 2020 between the middle school and the former high school (now the community education building).

== Schools ==
Schools in Whitehall District Schools
School	Address	Notes
Whitehall High School	3100 White Lake Dr., Whitehall	Grades 9–12. Opened fall 2004
Whitehall Middle School	401 S. Elizabeth St., Whitehall	Grades 6–8
Helen R. Ealy Elementary	425 E. Sophia St., Whitehall	Grades 3–5
Whitehall Shoreline Elementary	205 Market St., Whitehall	Grades PreK–2
Whitehall Community Education	541 E Slocum Street, Whitehall	Former high school, built 1960
Viking Athletic Center	541 E Slocum Street, Whitehall	Athletic center open to community membership

== See also ==
- List of school districts in Michigan
