= Muskegon Township, Michigan =

Muskegon Charter Township, Michigan
- Charter township
- Location within Michigan Location within the United States
- Coordinates: 43°15′38″N 86°11′00″W
- Country: United States
- State: Michigan
- County: Muskegon

Area
  - Total: 23.84 sq mi (61.7 km^{2})
  - Land: 23.47 sq mi (60.8 km^{2})
  - Water: 0.37 sq mi (0.96 km^{2})
- Elevation: 643 ft (196 m)

Population (2020)
  - Total: 17,596
  - Density: 749.6/sq mi (289.4/km^{2})
- Time zone: UTC-5 (Eastern (EST))
  - Summer (DST): UTC-4 (EDT)
- ZIP codes: 49442, 49445 (Muskegon); 49457 (Twin Lake)
- Area code: 231
- FIPS code: 26-56340
- GNIS feature ID: 1626784
- Website: muskegontwpmi.gov

Muskegon Charter Township is a charter township of Muskegon County in the U.S. state of Michigan. The population was 17,596 at the 2020 census. The city of Muskegon borders the township to the southwest and is administratively autonomous.

The township was organized in 1837. The township claims to be the "oldest township in the State of Michigan", as it was the first township officially recognized in the newly created state of Michigan. However, many other townships were created earlier than Muskegon Township.

== Geography ==
The township is in central Muskegon County and is bordered to the southwest by the city of Muskegon and to the west by the city of North Muskegon. According to the U.S. Census Bureau, the township has a total area of 23.8 square miles (62 km^{2}), of which 23.5 square miles (61 km^{2}) are land and 0.4 square miles (1.0 km^{2}), or 1.54%, are water. Most of the township is drained by the Muskegon River and its tributaries, while the southernmost portion is drained by Black Creek and its tributary, Little Black Creek.

== Major highways ==
- M-46 runs through the southern part of the township, leading west into Muskegon city and east to Cedar Springs.
- M-120 crosses the northwest part of the township, leading southwest into North Muskegon and northeast toward Fremont.
- US 31, a freeway, crosses the northern part of the township and runs along the western edge of the southern part of the township. It leads north toward Ludington and south to Holland.

== Demographics ==
Historical population
Census	Pop.	Note	%±
1860	1,450		—
1870	401		−72.3%
1880	924		130.4%
1890	1,498		62.1%
1900	1,316		−12.1%
1910	1,248		−5.2%
1920	3,427		174.6%
1930	10,232		198.6%
1940	6,067		−40.7%
1950	12,757		110.3%
1960	17,537		37.5%
1970	13,754		−21.6%
1980	14,557		5.8%
1990	15,302		5.1%
2000	17,737		15.9%
2010	17,840		0.6%
2020	17,596		−1.4%
U.S. Decennial Census

As of the census of 2000, there were 17,737 people, 6,581 households, and 4,771 families residing in the township. The population density was 743.9 inhabitants per square mile (287.2/km^{2}). There were 6,850 housing units at an average density of 287.3 per square mile (110.9/km^{2}). The racial makeup of the township was 91.46% White, 4.63% African American, 0.95% Native American, 0.28% Asian, 0.01% Pacific Islander, 0.79% from other races, and 1.87% from two or more races. Hispanic or Latino of any race were 3.21% of the population.

There were 6,581 households, out of which 38.6% had children under the age of 18 living with them, 53.1% were married couples living together, 14.7% had a female householder with no husband present, and 27.5% were non-families. 23.2% of all households were made up of individuals, and 11.6% had someone living alone who was 65 years of age or older. The average household size was 2.64 and the average family size was 3.11.

In the township the population was spread out, with 29.1% under the age of 18, 8.6% from 18 to 24, 28.6% from 25 to 44, 19.8% from 45 to 64, and 13.8% who were 65 years of age or older. The median age was 34 years. For every 100 females, there were 90.2 males. For every 100 females age 18 and over, there were 84.2 males.

The median income for a household in the township was $38,634, and the median income for a family was $45,178. Males had a median income of $36,111 versus $24,627 for females. The per capita income for the township was $16,623. About 8.2% of families and 9.1% of the population were below the poverty line, including 12.7% of those under age 18 and 7.3% of those age 65 or over.

== Schools ==
- Muskegon Technical Academy
- Orchard View Schools
- Reeths-Puffer School District
- Timberland Academy (National Heritage Academy)
