= Orchard View Schools =

School district

Address
- 35 South Sheridan Muskegon, Muskegon County, Michigan, 49442; United States

District information
- Grades: Pre-Kindergarten-12
- Superintendent: Thomas Hamilton
- Schools: 5
- Budget: $40,274,000 2022-2023 expenditures
- NCES District ID: 2626760

Students and staff
- Students: 2,064 (2024-2025)
- Teachers: 148.01 (on an FTE basis) (2024-2025)
- Staff: 322.73 FTE (2024-2025)
- Student–teacher ratio: 13.95 (2024-2025)

Other information
- Website: www.orchardview.org

Orchard View Schools is a public school district in Muskegon County, Michigan. It serves most of southern Muskegon Township and a sliver of the city of Muskegon.

== History ==
The district originated with a one-room schoolhouse called Orchard View School. It was built in 1895 at Apple Avenue and Harvey Street. As a primary school district, its students attended high school in Muskegon or Muskegon Heights until Orchard View opened its own high school in fall 1960. Jolman Elementary was built in 1936. Junior high students attended the high school building until Orchard View Middle School opened in fall 1966.

The present high school opened in fall 2006. Beginning in fall 2007, Jolman Elementary and Orchard View Elementary programs were combined at the former high school building, now called Cardinal Elementary. Orchard View Elementary became an Early Elementary building. The Jolman Elementary building housed community education programs until 2014, when the district moved them to a building it purchased at 2900 East Apple Avenue. Jolman Elementary was sold in 2017, but remained vacant as of 2024.

== Schools ==
Schools in Orchard View Schools district
School	Address	Notes
Orchard View High School	16 N. Quarterline, Muskegon	Grades 9–12; new building opened 2006.
Orchard View Middle School	35 South Sheridan, Muskegon	Grades 6–8. Built 1966.
Cardinal Elementary	2310 Marquette Ave., Muskegon	Grades 2–5; located at former high school. Built 1960.
Orchard View Early Elementary	2820 MacArthur Road, Muskegon	Grades PreK–1
Innovative Learning Center	2900 E Apple Ave., Muskegon	Alternative high school and adult education
