= United States House Financial Services Subcommittee on Housing and Insurance =

Subcommittee of Committee on Financial Services
- Active United States House of Representatives; 119th Congress

Leadership
- Chair: Mike Flood (R)
- Ranking Member: Emanuel Cleaver (D)

Structure
- Seats: 19 (19 currently filled) 10/10 9/9
- Political parties: Majority (10): Republican (10); Minority (9): Democratic (9)

Meeting place
- 2129, Rayburn House Office Building; Washington, D.C. 20515

Phone number
- (202)-225-7502

The U.S. House Financial Services Subcommittee on Housing and Insurance is a subcommittee of the House Committee on Financial Services. Between 2019 and 2013, it was known as the Subcommittee on Housing, Community Development and Insurance.

== Jurisdiction ==
The Housing, Community Development and Insurance subcommittee oversees the U.S. Department of Housing and Urban Development and Ginnie Mae. The subcommittee also handles matters related to public, affordable, and rural housing, as well as community development including Empowerment Zones, and government-sponsored insurance programs, such as the National Flood Insurance Program. The jurisdiction over insurance was transferred in 2001 to the then-House Banking and Financial Services Committee from the House Energy and Commerce Committee. Since that time it had been the purview of the Subcommittee on Capital Markets, Insurance and Government Sponsored Enterprises. But "with plans to reform Fannie Mae and Freddie Mac expected to take up much of that panel's agenda, insurance instead [was] moved to a new Subcommittee on Insurance, Housing and Community Opportunity [as of the 112th Congress]."

== Members, 119th Congress ==
| Majority | Minority |
|---|---|
| Mike Flood, Nebraska, Chair; Monica De La Cruz, Texas, Vice Chair; John Rose, Tennessee; William Timmons, South Carolina; Ralph Norman, South Carolina; Scott Fitzgerald, Wisconsin; Andrew Garbarino, New York; Mike Lawler, New York; María Elvira Salazar, Florida; Troy Downing, Montana | Emanuel Cleaver, Missouri, Ranking Member; Nydia Velázquez, New York; Rashida Tlaib, Michigan; Ritchie Torres, New York; Ayanna Pressley, Massachusetts; Sylvia Garcia, Texas; Nikema Williams, Georgia; Brittany Pettersen, Colorado; Janelle Bynum, Oregon |
Ex officio
| French Hill, Arkansas | Maxine Waters, California |

== Historical membership rosters ==
=== 115th Congress ===
| Majority | Minority |
|---|---|
| Sean Duffy, Wisconsin, Chairman; Dennis A. Ross, Florida, Vice Chair; Ed Royce, California; Steve Pearce, New Mexico; Bill Posey, Florida; Blaine Luetkemeyer, Missouri; Steve Stivers, Ohio; Randy Hultgren, Illinois; Keith Rothfus, Pennsylvania; Lee Zeldin, New York; Dave Trott, Michigan; Tom MacArthur, New Jersey; Ted Budd, North Carolina | Emanuel Cleaver, Missouri, Ranking Member; Nydia Velázquez, New York; Mike Capuano, Massachusetts; Lacy Clay, Missouri; Brad Sherman, California; Stephen Lynch, Massachusetts; Joyce Beatty, Ohio; Dan Kildee, Michigan; John Delaney, Maryland; Ruben Kihuen, Nevada |
Ex officio
| Jeb Hensarling, Texas | Maxine Waters, California |

=== 116th Congress ===
| Majority | Minority |
|---|---|
| Lacy Clay, Missouri, Chair; Nydia Velázquez, New York; Emanuel Cleaver, Missouri; Brad Sherman, California; Joyce Beatty, Ohio; Al Green, Texas; Vicente Gonzalez, Texas; Carolyn Maloney, New York; Denny Heck, Washington; Juan Vargas, California; Al Lawson, Florida; Rashida Tlaib, Michigan; Cindy Axne, Iowa | Steve Stivers, Ohio, Ranking Member; Bill Posey, Florida; Blaine Luetkemeyer, Missouri; Bill Huizenga, Michigan; Scott Tipton, Colorado; Lee Zeldin, New York; David Kustoff, Tennessee; John Rose, Tennessee; Bryan Steil, Wisconsin; Lance Gooden, Texas, Vice Ranking Member |
Ex officio
| Maxine Waters, California | Patrick McHenry, North Carolina |

=== 117th Congress ===
| Majority | Minority |
|---|---|
| Emanuel Cleaver, Missouri, Chair; Nydia Velázquez, New York; Brad Sherman, California; Joyce Beatty, Ohio; Al Green, Texas; Vicente Gonzalez, Texas; Carolyn Maloney, New York; Juan Vargas, California; Al Lawson, Florida; Cindy Axne, Iowa, Vice Chair; Ritchie Torres, New York | Steve Stivers, Ohio, Ranking Member; Lance Gooden, Texas; Bill Posey, Florida; Bill Huizenga, Michigan; Lee Zeldin, New York; Trey Hollingsworth, Indiana; Bryan Steil, Wisconsin, Vice Ranking Member; John Rose, Tennessee; Van Taylor, Texas |
Ex officio
| Maxine Waters, California | Patrick McHenry, North Carolina |

=== 118th Congress ===
| Majority | Minority |
|---|---|
| Warren Davidson, Ohio, Chair; Bill Posey, Florida; Blaine Luetkemeyer, Missouri; Ralph Norman, South Carolina; Scott Fitzgerald, Wisconsin; Andrew Garbarino, New York; Mike Flood, Nebraska; Mike Lawler, New York; Monica De La Cruz, Texas; Erin Houchin, Indiana | Emanuel Cleaver, Missouri, Ranking Member; Nydia Velázquez, New York; Rashida Tlaib, Michigan; Ritchie Torres, New York; Ayanna Pressley, Massachusetts; Sylvia Garcia, Texas; Nikema Williams, Georgia; Steven Horsford, Nevada; Brittany Pettersen, Colorado |
Ex officio
| Patrick McHenry, North Carolina | Maxine Waters, California |
