= United States House Financial Services Subcommittee on Oversight and Investigations =

Subcommittee of Committee on Financial Services
- Active United States House of Representatives; 119th Congress

Leadership
- Chair: Dan Meuser (R)
- Ranking Member: Al Green (D)

Structure
- Seats: 12 (12 currently filled) 7/7 5/5
- Political parties: Majority (7): Republican (7); Minority (5): Democratic (5)

Meeting place
- 2129, Rayburn House Office Building; Washington, D.C. 20515

Phone number
- (202)-225-7502

The U.S. House Subcommittee on Oversight and Investigations is a subcommittee of the House Committee on Financial Services.

== Jurisdiction ==
The Subcommittee conducts oversight of the agencies, departments, and programs under the Committee's jurisdiction. The Subcommittee also conducts investigations on any matter within the jurisdiction of the Committee, and evaluates the need for any legislative changes to the laws and programs within this jurisdiction.

== Members, 119th Congress ==
Majority	Minority
Dan Meuser, Pennsylvania, Chair; Tim Moore, North Carolina, Vice Chair; Ann Wagner, Missouri; Barry Loudermilk, Georgia; Andrew Garbarino, New York; Andy Ogles, Tennessee; Mike Haridopolos, Florida	Al Green, Texas, Ranking Member; Rashida Tlaib, Michigan; Nikema Williams, Georgia; Cleo Fields, Louisiana; Sam Liccardo, California
Ex officio
French Hill, Arkansas	Maxine Waters, California

== Historical membership rosters ==
=== 114th Congress ===
Majority	Minority
Sean Duffy, Wisconsin, Chairman; Scott Tipton, Colorado, Vice Chair; Peter T. King, New York; Patrick McHenry, North Carolina; Dennis A. Ross, Florida; Luke Messer, Indiana; Lee Zeldin, New York; Dave Trott, Michigan; Barry Loudermilk, Georgia; Ann Wagner, Missouri; Claudia Tenney, New York; Trey Hollingsworth, Indiana	Al Green, Texas, Ranking Member; Keith Ellison, Minnesota; Emanuel Cleaver, Missouri; Mike Capuano, Massachusetts; Joyce Beatty, Ohio; Mike Capuano, Massachusetts; Gwen Moore, Wisconsin; Josh Gottheimer, New Jersey; Vicente Gonzalez, Texas; Charlie Crist, Florida
Ex officio
Jeb Hensarling, Texas	Maxine Waters, California

=== 116th Congress ===
Majority	Minority
Al Green, Texas, Chair; Joyce Beatty, Ohio; Stephen Lynch, Massachusetts; Nydia Velázquez, New York; Ed Perlmutter, Colorado; Rashida Tlaib, Michigan; Sean Casten, Illinois; Madeleine Dean, Pennsylvania; Sylvia Garcia, Texas; Dean Phillips, Minnesota	Andy Barr, Kentucky, Ranking Member; Bill Posey, Florida; Lee Zeldin, New York, Vice Ranking Member; Barry Loudermilk, Georgia; Warren Davidson, Ohio; John Rose, Tennessee; Bryan Steil, Wisconsin
Ex officio
Maxine Waters, California	Patrick McHenry, North Carolina

=== 117th Congress ===
Majority	Minority
Al Green, Texas, Chair; Alma Adams, North Carolina; Rashida Tlaib, Michigan; Jesús "Chuy" García, Illinois; Sylvia Garcia, Texas; Nikema Williams, Georgia, Vice Chair	Andy Barr, Kentucky, Ranking Member; Barry Loudermilk, Georgia; Alex Mooney, West Virginia; David Kustoff, Tennessee; William Timmons, South Carolina, Vice Ranking Member
Ex officio
Maxine Waters, California	Patrick McHenry, North Carolina

=== 118th Congress ===
Majority	Minority
Bill Huizenga, Michigan, Chair; Pete Sessions, Texas; Ann Wagner, Missouri; Alex Mooney, West Virginia; John Rose, Tennessee, Vice Chair; Dan Meuser, Pennsylvania; Andy Ogles, Tennessee	Al Green, Texas, Ranking Member; Steven Horsford, Nevada; Rashida Tlaib, Michigan; Sylvia Garcia, Texas; Nikema Williams, Georgia
Ex officio
Patrick McHenry, North Carolina	Maxine Waters, California
