= United States House Financial Services Subcommittee on Digital Assets, Financial Technology, and Artificial Intelligence =

Subcommittee of Committee on Financial Services
- Active United States House of Representatives; 119th Congress

Leadership
- Chair: Bryan Steil (R)
- Ranking Member: Stephen F. Lynch (D)

Structure
- Seats: 21 (21 currently filled) 12/12 9/9
- Political parties: Majority (12): Republican (12); Minority (9): Democratic (9)

Meeting place
- 2129, Rayburn House Office Building; Washington, D.C. 20515

Phone number
- (202)-225-7502

The United States House Financial Services Subcommittee on Digital Assets, Financial Technology and Inclusion is a subcommittee of the House Committee on Financial Services. The Subcommittee on Diversity and Inclusion was created for the 116th United States Congress by Chairwoman Maxine Waters. However, under Republican control during the 118th Congress, the subcommittee expanded its focus to include digital financing, including cryptocurrency.

== Jurisdiction ==
From the committee rules of the 117th Congress:

The jurisdiction of the Subcommittee on Diversity and Inclusion includes —

- all matters related to diversity and inclusion within all the agencies, departments, programs, and entities within the jurisdiction of the committee, including workforce diversity and inclusion, external or customer diversity and inclusion, and supplier diversity;
- the Offices of Minority and Women Inclusion within the federal financial agencies
- methods, initiatives, and measures to promote financial and economic inclusion for all consumers.

== Members, 119th Congress ==
| Majority | Minority |
|---|---|
| Bryan Steil, Wisconsin, Chair; Tom Emmer, Minnesota, Vice Chair; Bill Huizenga, Michigan; Roger Williams, Texas; John Rose, Tennessee; William Timmons, South Carolina; Marlin Stutzman, Indiana; Byron Donalds, Florida; Zach Nunn, Iowa; Troy Downing, Montana; Mike Haridopolos, Florida; Tim Moore, North Carolina | Stephen Lynch, Massachusetts, Ranking Member; Bill Foster, Illinois; Josh Gottheimer, New Jersey; Sean Casten, Illinois; Ayanna Pressley, Massachusetts; Ritchie Torres, New York; Sylvia Garcia, Texas; Brittany Pettersen, Colorado; Brad Sherman, California; Sam Liccardo, California |
Ex officio
| French Hill, Arkansas | Maxine Waters, California |

== Historical membership rosters ==
=== 118th Congress ===
| Majority | Minority |
|---|---|
| French Hill, Arkansas, Chair; Frank Lucas, Oklahoma; Warren Davidson, Ohio, Vice Chair; John Rose, Tennessee; Bryan Steil, Wisconsin; William Timmons, South Carolina; Byron Donalds, Florida; Mike Flood, Nebraska; Erin Houchin, Indiana | Stephen Lynch, Massachusetts, Ranking Member; Bill Foster, Illinois; Josh Gottheimer, New Jersey; Ritchie Torres, New York; Brad Sherman, California; Al Green, Texas; Sean Casten, Illinois; Wiley Nickel, North Carolina |
Ex officio
| Patrick McHenry, North Carolina | Maxine Waters, California |

=== 117th Congress ===
| Majority | Minority |
|---|---|
| Emanuel Cleaver, Missouri, Chair; Nydia Velázquez, New York; Brad Sherman, California; Joyce Beatty, Ohio; Al Green, Texas; Vicente Gonzalez, Texas; Carolyn Maloney, New York; Juan Vargas, California; Al Lawson, Florida; Cindy Axne, Iowa, Vice Chair; Ritchie Torres, New York | Steve Stivers, Ohio, Ranking Member; Lance Gooden, Texas; Bill Posey, Florida; Bill Huizenga, Michigan; Lee Zeldin, New York; Trey Hollingsworth, Indiana; Bryan Steil, Wisconsin, Vice Ranking Member; John Rose, Tennessee; Van Taylor, Texas |
Ex officio
| Maxine Waters, California | Patrick McHenry, North Carolina |

=== 116th Congress ===
| Majority | Minority |
|---|---|
| Joyce Beatty, Ohio, Chair; Lacy Clay, Missouri; Al Green, Texas; Josh Gottheimer, New Jersey; Vicente Gonzalez, Texas; Al Lawson, Florida; Ayanna Pressley, Massachusetts; Tulsi Gabbard, Hawaii; Alma Adams, North Carolina; Madeleine Dean, Pennsylvania; Sylvia Garcia, Texas; Dean Phillips, Minnesota | Ann Wagner, Missouri, Ranking Member; Frank Lucas, Oklahoma; Alex Mooney, West Virginia; Ted Budd, North Carolina; David Kustoff, Tennessee; Trey Hollingsworth, Indiana; Anthony Gonzalez, Ohio, Vice Ranking Member; Bryan Steil, Wisconsin; Lance Gooden, Texas |
Ex officio
| Maxine Waters, California | Patrick McHenry, North Carolina |
