= United States House Financial Services Subcommittee on Financial Institutions =

Subcommittee of Committee on Financial Services
- Active United States House of Representatives; 119th Congress

Leadership
- Chair: Andy Barr (R)
- Ranking Member: Bill Foster (D)

Structure
- Seats: 25 (24 currently filled) 14/14 10/11
- Political parties: Majority (14): Republican (14); Minority (10): Democratic (10)

Meeting place
- 2129, Rayburn House Office Building; Washington, D.C. 20515

Phone number
- (202)-225-7502

The United States House Financial Services Subcommittee on Financial Institutions and Monetary Policy is a subcommittee of the House Committee on Financial Services. Jurisdiction over domestic monetary policy was transferred to it at the start of the 118th Congress, before which the subcommittee was known as the Subcommittee on Consumer Protection and Financial Institutions.

== Jurisdiction ==
The subcommittee oversees all financial regulators, such as the Federal Deposit Insurance Corporation and the Federal Reserve, all matters pertaining to consumer credit including the Consumer Credit Protection Act and access to financial services, as well as the safety and soundness of the banking system.

== Members, 119th Congress ==
Majority	Minority
Andy Barr, Kentucky, Chair; Barry Loudermilk, Georgia, Vice Chair; Bill Huizenga, Michigan; Roger Williams, Texas; John Rose, Tennessee; William Timmons, South Carolina; Ralph Norman, South Carolina; Dan Meuser, Pennsylvania; Young Kim, California; Byron Donalds, Florida; Scott L. Fitzgerald, Wisconsin; Mike Flood, Nebraska; Monica De La Cruz, Texas; Tim Moore, North Carolina	Bill Foster, Illinois Ranking Member; Nydia Velázquez, New York; Brad Sherman, California; Gregory Meeks, New York; David Scott, Georgia (until April 22, 2026); Al Green, Texas; Joyce Beatty, Ohio; Juan Vargas, California; Stephen Lynch, Massachusetts; Sean Casten, Illinois; Cleo Fields, Louisiana
Ex officio
French Hill, Arkansas	Maxine Waters, California

== Historical membership rosters ==
=== 118th Congress ===
Majority	Minority
Andy Barr, Kentucky, Chair; Bill Posey, Florida; Blaine Luetkemeyer, Missouri; Roger Williams, Texas; Barry Loudermilk, Georgia, Vice Chair; John Rose, Tennessee; William Timmons, South Carolina; John Rose, Tennessee; Ralph Norman, South Carolina; Scott L. Fitzgerald, Wisconsin; Young Kim, California; Byron Donalds, Florida; Monica De La Cruz, Texas; Andy Ogles, Tennessee	Bill Foster, Illinois Ranking Member; Nydia Velázquez, New York; Brad Sherman, California; Gregory Meeks, New York; David Scott, Georgia; Al Green, Texas; Joyce Beatty, Ohio; Juan Vargas, California; Sean Casten, Illinois; Ayanna Pressley, Massachusetts
Ex officio
Patrick McHenry, North Carolina	Maxine Waters, California

=== 117th Congress ===
Majority	Minority
Ed Perlmutter, Colorado, Chair; Gregory Meeks, New York; David Scott, Georgia; Nydia Velázquez, New York; Brad Sherman, California; Al Green, Texas; Bill Foster, Illinois; Juan Vargas, California; Al Lawson, Florida; Michael San Nicolas, Guam; Sean Casten, Illinois; Ayanna Pressley, Massachusetts, Vice Chair; Ritchie Torres, New York	Blaine Luetkemeyer, Missouri, Ranking Member; Frank Lucas, Oklahoma; Bill Posey, Florida; Andy Barr, Kentucky; Roger Williams, Texas; Barry Loudermilk, Georgia; Ted Budd, North Carolina; David Kustoff, Tennessee, Vice Ranking Member; John Rose, Tennessee; William Timmons, South Carolina
Ex officio
Maxine Waters, California	Patrick McHenry, North Carolina

=== 116th Congress ===
Majority	Minority
Gregory Meeks, New York, Chair; David Scott, Georgia; Nydia Velázquez, New York; Lacy Clay, Missouri; Denny Heck, Washington; Bill Foster, Illinois; Al Lawson, Florida; Rashida Tlaib, Michigan; Katie Porter, California; Ayanna Pressley, Massachusetts; Ben McAdams, Utah; Alexandria Ocasio-Cortez, New York; Jennifer Wexton, Virginia	Blaine Luetkemeyer, Missouri, Ranking Member; Frank Lucas, Oklahoma; Bill Posey, Florida; Andy Barr, Kentucky; Scott Tipton, Colorado, Vice Ranking Member; Roger Williams, Texas; Barry Loudermilk, Georgia; Ted Budd, North Carolina; David Kustoff, Tennessee; Denver Riggleman, Virginia
Ex officio
Maxine Waters, California	Patrick McHenry, North Carolina

=== 115th Congress ===
Majority	Minority
Blaine Luetkemeyer, Missouri, Chairman; Keith Rothfus, Pennsylvania, Vice Chair; Ed Royce, California; Frank Lucas, Oklahoma; Bill Posey, Florida; Dennis A. Ross, Florida; Robert Pittenger, North Carolina; Andy Barr, Kentucky; Scott Tipton, Colorado; Roger Williams, Texas; Mia Love, Utah; Dave Trott, Michigan; Barry Loudermilk, Georgia; David Kustoff, Tennessee; Claudia Tenney, New York	Lacy Clay, Missouri, Ranking Member; Carolyn Maloney, New York; Gregory Meeks, New York; David Scott, Georgia; Nydia Velázquez, New York; Al Green, Texas; Keith Ellison, Minnesota; Denny Heck, Washington; Gwen Moore, Wisconsin; Charlie Crist, Florida
Ex officio
Jeb Hensarling, Texas	Maxine Waters, California
