= Senator Timmons =

Senator Timmons may refer to:

- Jimmy Hodge Timmons (1939–2011), Georgia State Senate
- William Timmons (born 1984), South Carolina State Senate
