= United States House Committee on Financial Services =

Standing committee of the United States House of Representatives

House Financial Services Committee
Standing committee
- Active United States House of Representatives; 119th Congress

History
- Formed: December 11, 1865

Leadership
- Chair: French Hill (R); Since January 3, 2025
- Ranking Member: Maxine Waters (D); Since January 3, 2023

Structure
- Seats: 54 (53 currently filled) 30/30 23/24
- Political parties: Majority (30): Republican (30); Minority (23): Democratic (23)

Subcommittees
- Housing and Insurance; Oversight and Investigations; National Security, Illicit Finance, and International Financial Institutions; Capital Markets; Financial Institutions; Digital Assets, Financial Technology, and Artificial Intelligence

Meeting place
- 2129, Rayburn House Office Building; Washington, D.C. 20515

Website
- financialservices.house.gov (Republican) democrats-financialservices.house.gov (Democratic)

Phone number
- (202)-225-7502

The United States House Committee on Financial Services, also referred to as the House Banking Committee and previously known as the Committee on Banking and Currency, is the committee of the United States House of Representatives that oversees the entire financial services industry, including the securities, insurance, banking and housing industries. The Financial Services Committee also oversees the work of the Federal Reserve, the United States Department of the Treasury, the U.S. Securities and Exchange Commission and other financial services regulators.

The House Committee on Financial Services is considered to be one of the House's most powerful committees.

It is currently chaired by Republican French Hill from Arkansas, having assumed office in 2025. The ranking member is Democrat Maxine Waters from California, who previously chaired the committee under a Democratic majority in the House.

== Jurisdiction ==
Under the rules of the 113th Congress, the Financial Services Committee's jurisdiction includes:

1. Banks and banking, including deposit insurance and Federal monetary policy
2. Economic stabilization, defense production, renegotiation, and control of the price of commodities, rents, and services
3. Financial aid to commerce and industry (other than transportation)
4. Insurance generally
5. International finance
6. International financial and monetary organizations
7. Money and credit, including currency and the issuance of notes and redemption thereof; gold and silver, including the coinage thereof; valuation and revaluation of the dollar
8. Public and private housing
9. Securities and exchanges
10. Urban development

== History ==
The Banking and Currency Committee was created on December 11, 1865, to take over responsibilities previously handled by the Ways and Means Committee. It continued to function under this name until 1968, when it assumed the current name.

== Members, 119th Congress ==
| Majority | Minority |
|---|---|
| French Hill, Arkansas, Chair; Frank Lucas, Oklahoma; Pete Sessions, Texas; Bill Huizenga, Michigan, Vice Chair; Ann Wagner, Missouri; Andy Barr, Kentucky; Roger Williams, Texas; Tom Emmer, Minnesota; Barry Loudermilk, Georgia; Warren Davidson, Ohio; John Rose, Tennessee; Bryan Steil, Wisconsin; William Timmons, South Carolina; Marlin Stutzman, Indiana; Ralph Norman, South Carolina; Dan Meuser, Pennsylvania; Young Kim, California; Byron Donalds, Florida; Andrew Garbarino, New York; Scott L. Fitzgerald, Wisconsin; Mike Flood, Nebraska; Mike Lawler, New York; Monica De La Cruz, Texas; Andy Ogles, Tennessee; Zach Nunn, Iowa; Lisa McClain, Michigan; María Elvira Salazar, Florida; Troy Downing, Montana; Mike Haridopolos, Florida; Tim Moore, North Carolina | Maxine Waters, California, Ranking Member; Nydia Velázquez, New York; Brad Sherman, California; Gregory Meeks, New York; David Scott, Georgia (until April 22, 2026); Stephen Lynch, Massachusetts; Al Green, Texas; Emanuel Cleaver, Missouri; Jim Himes, Connecticut; Bill Foster, Illinois; Joyce Beatty, Ohio; Juan Vargas, California; Josh Gottheimer, New Jersey; Vicente Gonzalez, Texas; Sean Casten, Illinois, Vice Ranking Member; Ayanna Pressley, Massachusetts; Steven Horsford, Nevada; Rashida Tlaib, Michigan; Ritchie Torres, New York; Sylvia Garcia, Texas; Nikema Williams, Georgia; Brittany Pettersen, Colorado; Cleo Fields, Louisiana; Janelle Bynum, Oregon; Sam Liccardo, California; Everton Blair, Georgia (from September 16, 2026) |

Resolutions electing members: H.Res. 13 (Chair), H.Res. 14 (Ranking Member), H.Res. 21 (R), H.Res. 22 (D), H.Res. 1544 (Blair)

== Subcommittees ==
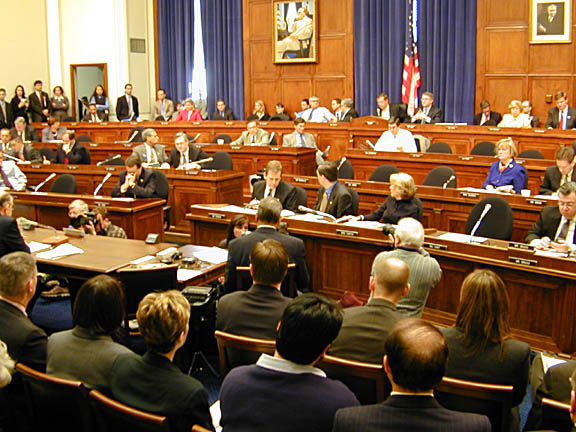
Meeting of the House Financial Services Committee

The Financial Services Committee operates with six subcommittees. The jurisdiction over insurance was transferred in 2001 to the then-House Banking and Financial Services Committee from the House Energy and Commerce Committee. Since that time it had been the purview of the Subcommittee on Capital Markets, Insurance and Government Sponsored Enterprises. But "with plans to reform Fannie Mae and Freddie Mac expected to take up much of that panel's agenda, insurance instead [was] moved to a new Subcommittee on Insurance, Housing and Community Opportunity [as of the 112th Congress]." In the 115th Congress, a new subcommittee on Terrorism and Illicit Finance was created, dedicated to disrupting the financing of terrorist organizations.

=== Current subcommittees ===
| Subcommittee | Chair | Ranking Member |
|---|---|---|
| Capital Markets | Ann Wagner (R-MO) | Brad Sherman (D-CA) |
| Digital Assets, Financial Technology, and Artificial Intelligence | Bryan Steil (R-WI) | Stephen Lynch (D-MA) |
| Financial Institutions | Andy Barr (R-KY) | Bill Foster (D-IL) |
| Housing and Insurance | Mike Flood (R-NE) | Emanuel Cleaver (D-MO) |
| National Security, Illicit Finance, and International Financial Institutions | Warren Davidson (R-OH) | Joyce Beatty (D-OH) |
| Oversight and Investigations | Dan Meuser (R-PA) | Al Green (D-TX) |

== Leadership ==
Chairs
| Name | Party | State | Start | End |
|---|---|---|---|---|
| Theodore Pomeroy | Republican | New York | 1865 | 1869 |
| James Garfield | Republican | Ohio | 1869 | 1871 |
| Samuel Hooper | Republican | Massachusetts | 1871 | 1873 |
| Horace Maynard | Republican | Tennessee | 1873 | 1875 |
| Samuel Cox | Democratic | New York | 1875 | 1877 |
| Aylett Buckner | Democratic | Missouri | 1877 | 1881 |
| William Crapo | Republican | Massachusetts | 1881 | 1883 |
| Aylett Buckner | Democratic | Missouri | 1883 | 1885 |
| Andrew Curtin | Democratic | Pennsylvania | 1885 | 1887 |
| Beriah Wilkins | Democratic | Ohio | 1887 | 1889 |
| George Dorsey | Republican | Nebraska | 1889 | 1891 |
| Henry Bacon | Democratic | New York | 1891 | 1893 |
| William Springer | Democratic | Illinois | 1893 | 1895 |
| Joseph Walker | Republican | Massachusetts | 1895 | 1899 |
| Marriott Brosius | Republican | Pennsylvania | 1899 | 1901 |
| Charles Fowler | Republican | New Jersey | 1901 | 1909 |
| Edward Vreeland | Republican | New York | 1909 | 1911 |
| Arsène Pujo | Democratic | Louisiana | 1911 | 1913 |
| Carter Glass | Democratic | Virginia | 1913 | 1918 |
| Michael Phelan | Democratic | Massachusetts | 1918 | 1919 |
| Edmund Platt | Republican | New York | 1919 | 1920 |
| Louis McFadden | Republican | Pennsylvania | 1920 | 1931 |
| Henry Steagall | Democratic | Alabama | 1931 | 1943 |
| Brent Spence | Democratic | Kentucky | 1943 | 1947 |
| Jesse Wolcott | Republican | Michigan | 1947 | 1949 |
| Brent Spence | Democratic | Kentucky | 1949 | 1953 |
| Jesse Wolcott | Republican | Michigan | 1953 | 1955 |
| Brent Spence | Democratic | Kentucky | 1955 | 1963 |
| Wright Patman | Democratic | Texas | 1963 | 1975 |
| Henry Reuss | Democratic | Wisconsin | 1975 | 1981 |
| Fernand St. Germain | Democratic | Rhode Island | 1981 | 1989 |
| Henry Gonzalez | Democratic | Texas | 1989 | 1995 |
| Jim Leach | Republican | Iowa | 1995 | 2001 |
| Mike Oxley | Republican | Ohio | 2001 | 2007 |
| Barney Frank | Democratic | Massachusetts | 2007 | 2011 |
| Spencer Bachus | Republican | Alabama | 2011 | 2013 |
| Jeb Hensarling | Republican | Texas | 2013 | 2019 |
| Maxine Waters | Democratic | California | 2019 | 2023 |
| Patrick McHenry | Republican | North Carolina | 2023 | 2025 |
| French Hill | Republican | Arkansas | 2025 | present |

Ranking members
| Name | Party | State | Start | End |
|---|---|---|---|---|
| Brent Spence | Democratic | Kentucky | 1947 | 1949 |
| Jesse Wolcott | Republican | Kentucky | 1949 | 1953 |
| Brent Spence | Democratic | Kentucky | 1953 | 1955 |
| Jesse Wolcott | Republican | Kentucky | 1955 | 1957 |
| Henry Talle | Republican | Iowa | 1957 | 1959 |
| Clarence Kilburn | Republican | New York | 1959 | 1965 |
| William Widnall | Republican | New Jersey | 1965 | 1975 |
| Albert Johnson | Republican | Pennsylvania | 1975 | 1977 |
| William Stanton | Republican | Ohio | 1977 | 1983 |
| Chalmers Wylie | Republican | Ohio | 1983 | 1993 |
| Jim Leach | Republican | Iowa | 1993 | 1995 |
| Henry González | Democratic | Texas | 1995 | 1999 |
| John LaFalce | Democratic | New York | 1999 | 2003 |
| Barney Frank | Democratic | Massachusetts | 2003 | 2007 |
| Spencer Bachus | Republican | Alabama | 2007 | 2011 |
| Barney Frank | Democratic | Massachusetts | 2011 | 2013 |
| Maxine Waters | Democratic | California | 2013 | 2019 |
| Patrick McHenry | Republican | North Carolina | 2019 | 2023 |
| Maxine Waters | Democratic | California | 2023 | present |

== Historical membership rosters ==
=== 118th Congress ===
| Majority | Minority |
|---|---|
| Patrick McHenry, North Carolina, Chair; Frank Lucas, Oklahoma; Pete Sessions, Texas; Bill Posey, Florida; Blaine Luetkemeyer, Missouri; Bill Huizenga, Michigan; Ann Wagner, Missouri; Andy Barr, Kentucky; Roger Williams, Texas; French Hill, Arkansas, Vice Chair; Tom Emmer, Minnesota; Barry Loudermilk, Georgia; Alex Mooney, West Virginia; Warren Davidson, Ohio; John Rose, Tennessee; Bryan Steil, Wisconsin; William Timmons, South Carolina; Ralph Norman, South Carolina; Dan Meuser, Pennsylvania; Young Kim, California; Byron Donalds, Florida; Andrew Garbarino, New York; Scott L. Fitzgerald, Wisconsin; Mike Flood, Nebraska; Mike Lawler, New York; Monica De La Cruz, Texas; Andy Ogles, Tennessee; Erin Houchin, Indiana; Zach Nunn, Iowa | Maxine Waters, California, Ranking Member; Nydia Velázquez, New York; Brad Sherman, California; Gregory Meeks, New York; David Scott, Georgia; Stephen Lynch, Massachusetts; Al Green, Texas; Emanuel Cleaver, Missouri; Jim Himes, Connecticut; Bill Foster, Illinois; Joyce Beatty, Ohio; Juan Vargas, California; Josh Gottheimer, New Jersey; Vicente Gonzalez, Texas; Sean Casten, Illinois; Ayanna Pressley, Massachusetts; Steven Horsford, Nevada; Rashida Tlaib, Michigan; Ritchie Torres, New York; Sylvia Garcia, Texas; Nikema Williams, Georgia; Wiley Nickel, North Carolina; Brittany Pettersen, Colorado |

Resolutions electing members: H.Res. 14 (Chair), H.Res. 15 (Ranking Member), H.Res. 56 (R), H.Res. 57 (D), H.Res. 71 (amending rank)

Subcommittees

| Subcommittee | Chair | Ranking Member |
|---|---|---|
| Capital Markets | Ann Wagner (R-MO) | Brad Sherman (D-CA) |
| Digital Assets, Financial Technology and Inclusion | French Hill (R-AR) | Stephen Lynch (D-MA) |
| Financial Institutions and Monetary Policy | Andy Barr (R-KY) | Bill Foster (D-IL) |
| Housing and Insurance | Warren Davidson (R-OH) | Emanuel Cleaver (D-MO) |
| National Security, Illicit Finance, and International Financial Institutions | Blaine Luetkemeyer (R-MO) | Joyce Beatty (D-OH) |
| Oversight and Investigations | Bill Huizenga (R-MI) | Al Green (D-TX) |

=== 117th Congress ===
| Majority | Minority |
|---|---|
| Maxine Waters, California, Chair; Carolyn Maloney, New York; Nydia Velázquez, New York; Brad Sherman, California; Gregory Meeks, New York; David Scott, Georgia; Al Green, Texas; Emanuel Cleaver, Missouri; Ed Perlmutter, Colorado; Jim Himes, Connecticut; Bill Foster, Illinois; Joyce Beatty, Ohio; Juan Vargas, California; Josh Gottheimer, New Jersey; Vicente Gonzalez, Texas; Al Lawson, Florida; Michael San Nicolas, Guam; Cindy Axne, Iowa; Sean Casten, Illinois; Ayanna Pressley, Massachusetts; Ritchie Torres, New York; Stephen Lynch, Massachusetts; Alma Adams, North Carolina; Rashida Tlaib, Michigan; Alexandria Ocasio-Cortez, New York; Madeleine Dean, Pennsylvania; Chuy García, Illinois; Sylvia Garcia, Texas; Nikema Williams, Georgia; Jake Auchincloss, Massachusetts, Vice Chair | Patrick McHenry, North Carolina, Ranking Member; Frank Lucas, Oklahoma; Pete Sessions, Texas (from June 30, 2021); Bill Posey, Florida; Blaine Luetkemeyer, Missouri; Bill Huizenga, Michigan; Ann Wagner, Missouri, Vice Ranking Member; Andy Barr, Kentucky; Roger Williams, Texas; French Hill, Arkansas; Tom Emmer, Minnesota; Lee Zeldin, New York; Barry Loudermilk, Georgia; Alex Mooney, West Virginia; Warren Davidson, Ohio; Ted Budd, North Carolina; David Kustoff, Tennessee; Trey Hollingsworth, Indiana; Anthony Gonzalez, Ohio; John Rose, Tennessee; Bryan Steil, Wisconsin; Lance Gooden, Texas; William Timmons, South Carolina; Van Taylor, Texas; Ralph Norman, South Carolina (from June 8, 2022) |

Resolutions electing members: H.Res. 9 (Chair), H.Res. 10 (Ranking Member), H.Res. 62 (D), H.Res. 63 (R), H.Res. 511 (R), H.Res. 1159 (R)

Subcommittees

| Subcommittee | Chair | Ranking Member |
|---|---|---|
| Consumer Protection and Financial Institutions | Ed Perlmutter (D-CO) | Blaine Luetkemeyer (R-MO) |
| Diversity and Inclusion | Joyce Beatty (D-OH) | Ann Wagner (R-MO) |
| Housing, Community Development and Insurance | Emanuel Cleaver (D-MO) | Steve Stivers (R-OH) |
| Investor Protection, Entrepreneurship and Capital Markets | Brad Sherman (D-CA) | Bill Huizenga (R-MI) |
| National Security, International Development and Monetary Policy | Jim Himes (D-CT) | French Hill (R-AR) |
| Oversight and Investigations | Al Green (D-TX) | Andy Barr (R-KY) |

=== 116th Congress ===
| Majority | Minority |
|---|---|
| Maxine Waters, California, Chair; Carolyn Maloney, New York; Nydia Velázquez, New York; Brad Sherman, California; Gregory Meeks, New York; Lacy Clay, Missouri; David Scott, Georgia; Al Green, Texas; Emanuel Cleaver, Missouri; Ed Perlmutter, Colorado; Jim Himes, Connecticut; Bill Foster, Illinois; Joyce Beatty, Ohio; Denny Heck, Washington; Juan Vargas, California; Josh Gottheimer, New Jersey; Vicente Gonzalez, Texas; Al Lawson, Florida; Michael San Nicolas, Guam, Vice Chair; Rashida Tlaib, Michigan; Katie Porter, California; Cindy Axne, Iowa; Sean Casten, Illinois; Ayanna Pressley, Massachusetts; Ben McAdams, Utah; Alexandria Ocasio-Cortez, New York; Jennifer Wexton, Virginia; Stephen Lynch, Massachusetts; Tulsi Gabbard, Hawaii; Alma Adams, North Carolina; Madeleine Dean, Pennsylvania; Chuy García, Illinois; Sylvia Garcia, Texas; Dean Phillips, Minnesota | Patrick McHenry, North Carolina, Ranking Member; Frank Lucas, Oklahoma; Bill Posey, Florida; Blaine Luetkemeyer, Missouri; Bill Huizenga, Michigan; Steve Stivers, Ohio; Ann Wagner, Missouri, Vice Ranking Member; Andy Barr, Kentucky; Scott Tipton, Colorado; Roger Williams, Texas; French Hill, Arkansas; Tom Emmer, Minnesota; Lee Zeldin, New York; Barry Loudermilk, Georgia; Alex Mooney, West Virginia; Warren Davidson, Ohio; Ted Budd, North Carolina; David Kustoff, Tennessee; Trey Hollingsworth, Indiana; Anthony Gonzalez, Ohio; John Rose, Tennessee; Bryan Steil, Wisconsin; Lance Gooden, Texas; Denver Riggleman, Virginia; William Timmons, South Carolina (since September 26, 2019); Van Taylor, Texas (since January 16, 2020) |

Sources: H.Res. 7 (Chair), H.Res. 8 (Ranking Member), H.Res. 57 (D), H.Res. 68 (R), H.Res. 596 (R), H.Res. 801 (R)

Subcommittees

| Subcommittee | Chair | Ranking Member |
|---|---|---|
| Consumer Protection and Financial Institutions | Gregory Meeks (D-NY) | Blaine Luetkemeyer (R-MO) |
| Diversity and Inclusion | Joyce Beatty (D-OH) | Ann Wagner (R-MO) |
| Housing, Community Development and Insurance | Lacy Clay (D-MO) | Steve Stivers (R-OH) |
| Investor Protection, Entrepreneurship and Capital Markets | Brad Sherman (D-CA) | Bill Huizenga (R-MI) |
| National Security, International Development and Monetary Policy | Emanuel Cleaver (D-MO) | French Hill (R-AR) |
| Oversight and Investigations | Al Green (D-TX) | Andy Barr (R-KY) |

=== 115th Congress ===
| Majority | Minority |
|---|---|
| Jeb Hensarling, Texas, Chair; Peter King, New York; Ed Royce, California; Frank Lucas, Oklahoma; Patrick McHenry, North Carolina; Steve Pearce, New Mexico; Bill Posey, Florida; Blaine Luetkemeyer, Missouri; Bill Huizenga, Michigan; Sean Duffy, Wisconsin; Steve Stivers, Ohio; Randy Hultgren, Illinois; Dennis Ross, Florida; Robert Pittenger, North Carolina; Ann Wagner, Missouri; Andy Barr, Kentucky; Keith Rothfus, Pennsylvania; Luke Messer, Indiana; Scott Tipton, Colorado; Roger Williams, Texas; Bruce Poliquin, Maine; Mia Love, Utah; French Hill, Arkansas; Tom Emmer, Minnesota; Lee Zeldin, New York; Dave Trott, Michigan; Barry Loudermilk, Georgia; Alex Mooney, West Virginia; Tom MacArthur, New Jersey; Warren Davidson, Ohio; Ted Budd, North Carolina; David Kustoff, Tennessee; Claudia Tenney, New York; Trey Hollingsworth, Indiana | Maxine Waters, California, Ranking Member; Carolyn Maloney, New York; Nydia Velázquez, New York; Brad Sherman, California; Gregory Meeks, New York; Michael Capuano, Massachusetts; Lacy Clay, Missouri; Stephen Lynch, Massachusetts; David Scott, Georgia; Al Green, Texas; Emanuel Cleaver, Missouri; Gwen Moore, Wisconsin; Keith Ellison, Minnesota; Ed Perlmutter, Colorado; Jim Himes, Connecticut; Bill Foster, Illinois; Dan Kildee, Michigan, Vice Ranking Member; John Delaney, Maryland; Kyrsten Sinema, Arizona; Joyce Beatty, Ohio; Denny Heck, Washington; Juan Vargas, California; Josh Gottheimer, New Jersey; Vicente Gonzalez, Texas; Charlie Crist, Florida; Ruben Kihuen, Nevada |

=== 114th Congress ===
| Majority | Minority |
|---|---|
| Jeb Hensarling, Texas, Chair; Peter King, New York; Ed Royce, California; Frank Lucas, Oklahoma; Scott Garrett, New Jersey; Randy Neugebauer, Texas; Patrick McHenry, North Carolina; Steve Pearce, New Mexico; Bill Posey, Florida; Mike Fitzpatrick, Pennsylvania; Lynn Westmoreland, Georgia; Blaine Luetkemeyer, Missouri; Bill Huizenga, Michigan; Sean Duffy, Wisconsin; Robert Hurt, Virginia; Steve Stivers, Ohio; Stephen Fincher, Tennessee; Marlin Stutzman, Indiana; Mick Mulvaney, South Carolina; Randy Hultgren, Illinois; Dennis Ross, Florida; Robert Pittenger, North Carolina; Ann Wagner, Missouri; Andy Barr, Kentucky; Keith Rothfus, Pennsylvania; Luke Messer, Indiana; David Schweikert, Arizona; Bob Dold, Illinois; Frank Guinta, New Hampshire; Scott Tipton, Colorado; Roger Williams, Texas; Bruce Poliquin, Maine; Mia Love, Utah; French Hill, Arkansas | Maxine Waters, California, Ranking Member; Carolyn Maloney, New York; Nydia Velázquez, New York; Brad Sherman, California; Gregory Meeks, New York; Michael Capuano, Massachusetts; Ruben Hinojosa, Texas; Lacy Clay, Missouri; Stephen Lynch, Massachusetts; David Scott, Georgia; Al Green, Texas; Emanuel Cleaver, Missouri; Gwen Moore, Wisconsin; Keith Ellison, Minnesota; Ed Perlmutter, Colorado; Jim Himes, Connecticut; John Carney, Delaware; Terri Sewell, Alabama; Bill Foster, Illinois; Dan Kildee, Michigan; Patrick Murphy, Florida; John Delaney, Maryland; Kyrsten Sinema, Arizona; Joyce Beatty, Ohio; Denny Heck, Washington; Juan Vargas, California |

Sources: H.Res. 6 (Chair), H.Res. 7 (Ranking Member), H.Res. 29 (R), H.Res. 45 (D)

=== 113th Congress ===
| Majority | Minority |
|---|---|
| Jeb Hensarling, Texas, Chair; Spencer Bachus, Alabama; Peter King, New York; Ed Royce, California; Frank Lucas, Oklahoma; Gary Miller, California, Vice Chair; Shelley Moore Capito, West Virginia; Scott Garrett, New Jersey; Randy Neugebauer, Texas; Patrick McHenry, North Carolina; John Campbell, California; Michele Bachmann, Minnesota; Steve Pearce, New Mexico; Bill Posey, Florida; Mike Fitzpatrick, Pennsylvania; Lynn Westmoreland, Georgia; Blaine Luetkemeyer, Missouri; Bill Huizenga, Michigan; Sean Duffy, Wisconsin; Robert Hurt, Virginia; Steve Stivers, Ohio; Stephen Fincher, Tennessee; Marlin Stutzman, Indiana; Mick Mulvaney, South Carolina; Randy Hultgren, Illinois; Dennis Ross, Florida; Robert Pittenger, North Carolina; Ann Wagner, Missouri; Andy Barr, Kentucky; Keith Rothfus, Pennsylvania; Tom Cotton, Arkansas; Luke Messer, Indiana | Maxine Waters, California, Ranking Member; Carolyn Maloney, New York; Nydia Velázquez, New York; Brad Sherman, California; Gregory Meeks, New York; Michael Capuano, Massachusetts; Ruben Hinojosa, Texas; Lacy Clay, Missouri; Stephen Lynch, Massachusetts; David Scott, Georgia; Al Green, Texas; Emanuel Cleaver, Missouri; Gwen Moore, Wisconsin; Keith Ellison, Minnesota; Ed Perlmutter, Colorado; Jim Himes, Connecticut; Gary Peters, Michigan; John Carney, Delaware; Terri Sewell, Alabama; Bill Foster, Illinois; Dan Kildee, Michigan; Patrick Murphy, Florida; John Delaney, Maryland; Kyrsten Sinema, Arizona; Joyce Beatty, Ohio; Denny Heck, Washington; Steven Horsford, Nevada |

=== 112th Congress ===
| Majority | Minority |
|---|---|
| Spencer Bachus, Alabama, Chair; Jeb Hensarling, Texas, Vice Chair; Peter King, New York; Ed Royce, California; Frank Lucas, Oklahoma; Ron Paul, Texas; Don Manzullo, Illinois; Gary Miller, California; Shelley Moore Capito, West Virginia; Scott Garrett, New Jersey; Randy Neugebauer, Texas; Patrick McHenry, North Carolina; John Campbell, California; Michele Bachmann, Minnesota; Kevin McCarthy, California; Steve Pearce, New Mexico; Bill Posey, Florida; Mike Fitzpatrick, Pennsylvania; Lynn Westmoreland, Georgia; Blaine Luetkemeyer, Missouri; Bill Huizenga, Michigan; Sean Duffy, Wisconsin; Nan Hayworth, New York; James Renacci, Ohio; Robert Hurt, Virginia; Bob Dold, Illinois; David Schweikert, Arizona; Michael Grimm, New York; Quico Canseco, Texas; Steve Stivers, Ohio; Stephen Fincher, Tennessee; Frank Guinta, New Hampshire | Barney Frank, Massachusetts, Ranking Member; Maxine Waters, California; Carolyn Maloney, New York; Luis Gutiérrez, Illinois; Nydia Velázquez, New York; Mel Watt, North Carolina; Gary Ackerman, New York; Brad Sherman, California; Gregory Meeks, New York; Michael Capuano, Massachusetts; Ruben Hinojosa, Texas; Lacy Clay, Missouri; Carolyn McCarthy, New York; Joe Baca, California; Stephen Lynch, Massachusetts; Brad Miller, North Carolina; David Scott, Georgia; Al Green, Texas; Emanuel Cleaver, Missouri; Gwen Moore, Wisconsin; Keith Ellison, Minnesota; Ed Perlmutter, Colorado; Joe Donnelly, Indiana; André Carson, Indiana; Jim Himes, Connecticut; Gary Peters, Michigan; John Carney, Delaware |

Source: https://financialservices.house.gov/uploadedfiles/113th_congress_membership.pdf

=== 111th Congress ===
| Majority | Minority |
|---|---|
| Barney Frank, Massachusetts, Chair; Paul Kanjorski, Pennsylvania; Maxine Waters, California; Carolyn Maloney, New York; Luis Gutiérrez, Illinois; Nydia Velázquez, New York; Mel Watt, North Carolina; Gary Ackerman, New York; Brad Sherman, California; Gregory Meeks, New York; Dennis Moore, Kansas; Michael Capuano, Massachusetts; Ruben Hinojosa, Texas; Lacy Clay, Missouri; Carolyn McCarthy, New York; Joe Baca, California; Stephen Lynch, Massachusetts; Brad Miller, North Carolina; David Scott, Georgia; Al Green, Texas; Emanuel Cleaver, Missouri; Melissa Bean, Illinois; Gwen Moore, Wisconsin; Paul Hodes, New Hampshire; Keith Ellison, Minnesota; Ron Klein, Florida; Charles Wilson, Ohio; Ed Perlmutter, Colorado; Joe Donnelly, Indiana; Bill Foster, Illinois; André Carson, Indiana; Jackie Speier, California; Travis Childers, Mississippi; Walt Minnick, Idaho; John Adler, New Jersey; Mary Jo Kilroy, Ohio; Steve Driehaus, Ohio; Suzanne Kosmas, Florida; Alan Grayson, Florida; Jim Himes, Connecticut; Gary Peters, Michigan; Dan Maffei, New York | Spencer Bachus, Alabama, Ranking Member; Mike Castle, Delaware; Peter King, New York; Ed Royce, California; Frank Lucas, Oklahoma; Ron Paul, Texas; Don Manzullo, Illinois; Walter B. Jones Jr., North Carolina; Judy Biggert, Illinois; Gary Miller, California; Shelley Moore Capito, West Virginia; Jeb Hensarling, Texas; Scott Garrett, New Jersey; Gresham Barrett, South Carolina; Jim Gerlach, Pennsylvania; Randy Neugebauer, Texas; Tom Price, Georgia; Patrick McHenry, North Carolina; John Campbell, California; Adam Putnam, Florida; Michele Bachmann, Minnesota; Kenny Marchant, Texas; Thaddeus McCotter, Michigan; Kevin McCarthy, California; Steve Pearce, New Mexico; Bill Posey, Florida; Lynn Jenkins, Kansas; Christopher Lee, New York; Erik Paulsen, Minnesota; Leonard Lance, New Jersey |

Source: https://financialservices.house.gov/uploadedfiles/111thmembers.pdf

=== 110th Congress ===
| Majority | Minority |
|---|---|
| Barney Frank, Massachusetts, Chair; Paul Kanjorski, Pennsylvania; Maxine Waters, California; Carolyn Maloney, New York; Luis Gutiérrez, Illinois; Nydia Velázquez, New York; Mel Watt, North Carolina; Gary Ackerman, New York; Brad Sherman, California; Gregory Meeks, New York; Dennis Moore, Kansas; Michael Capuano, Massachusetts; Ruben Hinojosa, Texas; Lacy Clay, Missouri; Carolyn McCarthy, New York; Joe Baca, California; Stephen Lynch, Massachusetts; Brad Miller, North Carolina; David Scott, Georgia; Al Green, Texas; Emanuel Cleaver, Missouri; Melissa Bean, Illinois; Gwen Moore, Wisconsin; Lincoln Davis, Tennessee; Paul Hodes, New Hampshire; Keith Ellison, Minnesota; Ron Klein, Florida; Tim Mahoney, Florida; Charles Wilson, Ohio; Ed Perlmutter, Colorado; Chris Murphy, Connecticut; Joe Donnelly, Indiana; Bill Foster, Illinois; André Carson, Indiana; Jackie Speier, California; Don Cazayoux, Louisiana; Travis Childers, Mississippi | Spencer Bachus, Alabama, Ranking Member; Deborah Pryce, Ohio; Mike Castle, Delaware; Peter King, New York; Ed Royce, California; Frank Lucas, Oklahoma; Ron Paul, Texas; Steve LaTourette, Ohio; Don Manzullo, Illinois; Walter B. Jones Jr., North Carolina; Judy Biggert, Illinois; Chris Shays, Connecticut; Gary Miller, California; Shelley Moore Capito, West Virginia; Tom Feeney, Florida; Jeb Hensarling, Texas; Scott Garrett, New Jersey; Ginny Brown-Waite, Florida; Gresham Barrett, South Carolina; Jim Gerlach, Pennsylvania; Steve Pearce, New Mexico; Randy Neugebauer, Texas; Tom Price, Georgia; Geoff Davis, Kentucky; Patrick McHenry, North Carolina; John Campbell, California; Adam Putnam, Florida; Michele Bachmann, Minnesota; Peter Roskam, Illinois; Kenny Marchant, Texas; Thaddeus McCotter, Michigan; Kevin McCarthy, California; Dean Heller, Nevada |

=== 109th Congress ===
| Majority | Minority |
|---|---|
| Mike Oxley, Ohio, Chair; Jim Leach, Iowa; Deborah Pryce, Ohio; Spencer Bachus, Alabama; Mike Castle, Delaware; Peter King, New York; Ed Royce, California; Frank Lucas, Oklahoma; Sue Kelly, New York, Vice Chair; Ron Paul, Texas; Paul Gillmor, Ohio; Jim Ryun, Kansas; Steve LaTourette, Ohio; Don Manzullo, Illinois; Walter B. Jones Jr., North Carolina; Judy Biggert, Illinois; Chris Shays, Connecticut; Vito Fossella, New York; Gary Miller, California; Pat Tiberi, Ohio; Mark Kennedy, Minnesota; Jeb Hensarling, Texas; Tom Feeney, Florida; Scott Garrett, New Jersey; Ginny Brown-Waite, Florida; Gresham Barrett, South Carolina; Katherine Harris, Florida; Rick Renzi, Arizona; Jim Gerlach, Pennsylvania; Steve Pearce, New Mexico; Randy Neugebauer, Texas; Tom Price, Georgia; Mike Fritzpatrick, Pennsylvania; Geoff Davis, Kentucky; Patrick McHenry, North Carolina; John Campbell, California | Barney Frank, Massachusetts, Ranking Member; Paul Kanjorski, Pennsylvania; Maxine Waters, California; Carolyn Maloney, New York; Luis Gutiérrez, Illinois; Nydia Velázquez, New York; Mel Watt, North Carolina; Gary Ackerman, New York; Darlene Hooley, Oregon; Julia Carson, Indiana; Brad Sherman, California; Gregory Meeks, New York; Barbara Lee, California; Dennis Moore, Kansas; Michael Capuano, Massachusetts; Harold Ford Jr., Tennessee; Ruben Hinojosa, Texas; Joe Crowley, New York; Lacy Clay, Missouri; Steve Israel, New York; Carolyn McCarthy, New York; Joe Baca, California; Jim Matheson, Utah; Stephen Lynch, Massachusetts; Brad Miller, North Carolina; David Scott, Georgia; Artur Davis, Alabama; Emanuel Cleaver, Missouri; Melissa Bean, Illinois; Debbie Wasserman Schultz, Florida; Gwen Moore, Wisconsin; Bernie Sanders, Vermont |

=== 108th Congress ===
| Majority | Minority |
|---|---|
| Mike Oxley, Ohio, Chair; Jim Leach, Iowa; Richard Baker, Louisiana; Spencer Bachus, Alabama; Mike Castle, Delaware; Peter King, New York; Ed Royce, California; Frank Lucas, Oklahoma; Bob Ney, Ohio; Sue Kelly, New York, Vice Chair; Ron Paul, Texas; Paul Gillmor, Ohio; Jim Ryun, Kansas; Steve LaTourette, Ohio; Don Manzullo, Illinois; Walter B. Jones Jr., North Carolina; Doug Ose, California; Judy Biggert, Illinois; Mark Green, Wisconsin; Pat Toomey, Pennsylvania; Chris Shays, Connecticut; John Shadegg, Arizona; Vito Fossella, New York; Gary Miller, California; Pat Tiberi, Ohio; Mark Kennedy, Minnesota; Tom Feeney, Florida; Jeb Hensarling, Texas; Scott Garrett, New Jersey; Tim Murphy, Pennsylvania; Ginny Brown-Waite, Florida; Gresham Barrett, South Carolina; Katherine Harris, Florida; Rick Renzi, Arizona; Jim Gerlach, Pennsylvania | Barney Frank, Massachusetts, Ranking Member; Paul Kanjorski, Pennsylvania; Maxine Waters, California; Carolyn Maloney, New York; Luis Gutiérrez, Illinois; Nydia Velázquez, New York; Mel Watt, North Carolina; Gary Ackerman, New York; Darlene Hooley, Oregon; Julia Carson, Indiana; Brad Sherman, California; Gregory Meeks, New York; Barbara Lee, California; Jay Inslee, Washington; Dennis Moore, Kansas; Michael Capuano, Massachusetts; Harold Ford Jr., Tennessee; Ruben Hinojosa, Texas; Ken Lucas, Kentucky; Joe Crowley, New York; Lacy Clay, Missouri; Steve Israel, New York; Mike Ross, Arizona; Carolyn McCarthy, New York; Joe Baca, California; Jim Matheson, Utah; Stephen Lynch, Massachusetts; Brad Miller, North Carolina; Rahm Emanuel, Illinois; David Scott, Georgia; Artur Davis, Alabama; Chris Bell, Texas; Bernie Sanders, Vermont |

=== 107th Congress ===
| Majority | Minority |
|---|---|
| Mike Oxley, Ohio, Chair; Jim Leach, Iowa; Marge Roukema, New Jersey, Vice Chair; Richard Baker, Louisiana; Spencer Bachus, Alabama; Mike Castle, Delaware; Peter King, New York; Ed Royce, California; Frank Lucas, Oklahoma; Bob Ney, Ohio; Bob Barr, Georgia; Sue Kelly, New York; Ron Paul, Texas; Paul Gillmor, Ohio; Christopher Cox, California; Dave Weldon, Florida; Jim Ryun, Kansas; Bob Riley, Alabama; Steve LaTourette, Ohio; Don Manzullo, Illinois; Walter B. Jones Jr., North Carolina; Doug Ose, California; Judy Biggert, Illinois; Mark Green, Wisconsin; Pat Toomey, Pennsylvania; Chris Shays, Connecticut; John Shadegg, Arizona; Vito Fossella, New York; Gary Miller, California; Eric Cantor, Virginia; Felix Grucci, New York; Melissa Hart, Pennsylvania; Shelley Moore Capito, West Virginia; Mike Ferguson, New Jersey; Mike Rogers, Michigan; Pat Tiberi, Ohio | John LaFalce, New York, Ranking Member; Barney Frank, Massachusetts; Paul Kanjorski, Pennsylvania; Maxine Waters, California; Carolyn Maloney, New York; Luis Gutiérrez, Illinois; Nydia Velázquez, New York; Mel Watt, North Carolina; Gary Ackerman, New York; Ken Bentsen, Texas; Darlene Hooley, Oregon; Julia Carson, Indiana; Brad Sherman, California; Max Sandlin, Texas; Gregory Meeks, New York; Barbara Lee, California; Frank Mascara, Pennsylvania; Jay Inslee, Washington; Jan Schakowsky, Illinois; Dennis Moore, Kansas; Charlie Gonzalez, Texas; Stephanie Tubbs Jones, Ohio; Michael Capuano, Massachusetts; Harold Ford Jr., Tennessee; Ruben Hinojosa, Texas; Ken Lucas, Kentucky; Joe Crowley, New York; Lacy Clay, Missouri; Steve Israel, New York; Mike Ross, Arizona; Bernie Sanders, Vermont |

=== 93rd Congress ===
| Majority | Minority |
|---|---|
| Wright Patman, Texas, Chair; Leonor Sullivan, Missouri; Henry Reuss, Wisconsin; Thomas Ashley, Ohio; William Moorhead, Pennsylvania; Robert Stephens, Georgia; Fernand St. Germain, Rhode Island; Henry Gonzalez, Texas; Joseph Minish, New Jersey; Richard Hanna, California; Tom Gettys, South Carolina; Frank Annunzio, Illinois; Thomas Rees, California; James Hanley, New York; Frank Brasco, New York; Edward Koch, New York; William Cotter, Connecticut; Parren Mitchell, Maryland; Walter Fauntroy, District of Columbia; Andrew Young, Georgia; John Moakley, Massachusetts; Pete Stark, California; Lindy Boggs, Louisiana | William Widnall, New Jersey; Albert W. Johnson, Pennsylvania; William Stanton, Ohio; Benjamin Blackburn, Georgia; Garry E. Brown, Michigan; Lawrence G. Williams, Pennsylvania; Chalmers Wylie, Ohio; Margaret Heckler, Massachusetts; Phil Crane, Illinois; John Rousselot, California; Stewart McKinney, Connecticut; Bill Frenzel, Minnesota; Angelo Roncallo, New York; John Bertrand Conlan, Arizona; Clair Burgener, California; Matthew Rinaldo, New Jersey |

== See also ==
- United States Senate Committee on Banking, Housing, and Urban Affairs
- List of United States House of Representatives committees
