= Glenn Steil Sr. =

American politician (1940–2010)

Glenn Steil

Member of the Michigan Senate
- In office April 28, 1994 – January 8, 2003
- Preceded by: Vern Ehlers (32nd district)
- Succeeded by: Wayne Kuipers (30th district)
- Constituency: 32nd district (1994–1995); 30th district (1995–2002)

Personal details
- Born: Glenn Dale Steil; August 29, 1940 Grand Rapids, Michigan, U.S.
- Died: May 7, 2010 (aged 69) Bonita Springs, Florida, U.S.
- Party: Republican
- Education: Davenport University (AA); Aquinas College (BBA)

Military service
- Branch/service: United States Coast Guard
- Years of service: 1958–1962

Glenn Dale Steil (August 29, 1940 – May 7, 2010) was an American politician who served as a member of the Michigan Senate from the 32nd and 30th districts as a member of the Republican Party.

Steil grew up in Grand Rapids, Michigan, and graduated from Davenport University and Aquinas College. In the 1990s he entered politics when he served as the chairman of multiple organizations supporting term limits for politicians. After leading a successful term limit ballot initiative Steil ran in a special election for Michigan's 3rd congressional district, but was defeated in the Republican primary. He later won a seat in the Michigan Senate in a special election and served until he was term limited in 2003.

== Early life ==
Glenn Dale Steil was born on August 29, 1940, in Grand Rapids, Michigan, to Adolph Albert Steil III and Theresa Jane Roberts. From 1958 to 1962, he served in the United States Coast Guard until he was honorable discharged. In 1962, he graduated from Davenport University with an associate degree in accounting. In 1972, he graduated from Aquinas College with a bachelor's degree in business administration.

His son, Glenn Steil Jr., served in the Michigan House of Representatives from the 72nd district.

== Career ==
=== U.S. House of Representatives campaign ===
On July 31, 1993, Representative Paul B. Henry died from brain cancer leaving the Michigan's 3rd congressional district vacant. Steil was speculated as a possible candidate in the Republican primary for the district and announced his candidacy on August 25. In the Republican primary he placed fourth behind Vern Ehlers after spending over $342,019.

=== Michigan Senate ===
==== Elections ====
In December 1993, Ehlers won the special election in the 3rd congressional district which created a vacancy in the Michigan Senate from the 32nd district. Steil ran for the Republican nomination in the special election and won in the primary. In the special election he defeated Democratic nominee Paul Mayhue and Libertarian nominee Dan Marsh. On April 28, Steil was inaugurated into the Michigan Senate.

During the 1994 elections Steil ran in the 30th district against Democratic nominee David E. Doyle, Libertarian nominee Steve Butler, and Natural Law nominee Constantine Katsoris. In 1998, he won against Democratic nominee Carol Hennessy after spending $306,000. During the 1998 election he held a birthday party at the John Ball Zoo that cost $20,339.63 and charged the cost of the party to his campaign fund. He repaid the amount after the Secretary of State asked him to explain the expenditure as it violated campaign finance law since it wasn't a fundraiser.

In 2002, Steil was one of twenty-seven members of the Michigan Senate unable to run for reelection due to term limits. Wayne Kuipers was elected to succeed Steil and took office on January 8, 2003.

==== Tenure ====
During his tenure in the Michigan Senate Steil served as the chairman of the Human Resources and Labor committee.

During the 1996 presidential election Steil initially supported and endorsed Phil Gramm for the Republican nomination, but later endorsed Bob Dole after Gramm had dropped out and endorsed Dole. Steil later served as a Michigan delegate to the Republican National Convention. During the 2000 presidential election he donated to George W. Bush's presidential campaign and Steil was later speculated as a possible appointee in the Bush administration.

== Later life ==
During the 2004 presidential election he raised over $100,000 for President Bush's presidential campaign. During the 2010 Michigan gubernatorial election he served on the finance committee in Michigan Attorney General Mike Cox's gubernatorial campaign.

On May 7, 2010, Steil died from a heart attack in Bonita Springs, Florida.

== Political positions and legislation ==
=== Taxation ===
On March 22, 1995, the Michigan Senate voted 33 to 4 in favor of legislation proposed by Steil which would allow for-profit corporations to not file annual state reports.

In 1997, he introduced legislation that would increase the diesel gasoline tax by 4¢ a gallon.

=== Term limits ===
In the 1990s Steil served as the chairman of The Campaign to Limit Politicians' Terms and stated that term limits would "return power to the hands of the voters".

Steil served as the co-chairman of Vote Yes on Proposal B committee; proposal B would limit members of the Michigan House of Representatives to three two-years terms, members of the Michigan Senate, secretary of state, attorney general, lieutenant governor, and governor would be limited to two four-year terms, members of the United States House of Representatives would be limited to three two-year terms in a twelve-year period, and members of the United States Senate would be limited to two six-year terms in a twenty four-year period. In the general election the ballot initiative passed with 2,295,904 votes in favor to 1,614,404 votes against.

However, in 1997, Steil gave support to extending the term limits to ten or twelve years and stated that "Now that I've got a little wisdom, I feel there's something to be said for experience." At the time he was limited to only one more term in the Michigan Senate.

=== Youth ===
In 1997, Steil introduced legislation that would urge school districts to adopt school uniforms stating that "it would enhance students' grades and discipline, especially among poorer students".

In 1997, he introduced legislation stating that people under the age of 18 who are given tickets must show evidence that they are attending school or have graduated from high school. If the person is a high school dropout then their driver's license would be suspended.

== Electoral history ==
1994 Michigan Senate 32nd district special election
Party	Candidate	Votes	%
Republican	Glenn Steil Sr.	14,806	64.18%
Democratic	Paul Mayhue	7,775	33.70%
Libertarian	Dan Marsh	490	2.12%
Total votes		23,071	100.00%

1998 Michigan Senate 30th district Republican primary
Primary election
Party	Candidate	Votes	%
Republican	Glenn Steil Sr. (incumbent)	19,215	100.00%
Total votes		19,215	100.00%
General election
Republican	Glenn Steil Sr. (incumbent)	47,499	62.48%
Democratic	Carol Hennessy	28,525	37.52%
Total votes		76,024	100.00%
