= Wayne Kuipers =

American politician (born 1961)

Wayne D. Kuipers

Member of the Michigan Senate from the 30th district
- In office January 1, 2003 – January 1, 2011
- Preceded by: Glenn Steil Sr.
- Succeeded by: Arlan Meekhof

Member of the Michigan House of Representatives from the 90th district
- In office January 1, 1999 – January 1, 2003
- Preceded by: Jessie F. Dalman
- Succeeded by: Bill Huizenga

Personal details
- Born: August 5, 1961 (age 65) Holland, Michigan, U.S.
- Party: Republican
- Spouse: Jody
- Children: 3
- Education: Calvin College (BA); Aquinas College (MA)

Wayne D. Kuipers (born August 5, 1961) is a Republican from Michigan. He previously served in the Michigan House of Representatives from 1999 until 2003 and the Michigan Senate from 2003 until 2011. He ran for Michigan's 2nd congressional district in the 2010 election. He lost the Republican primary to Bill Huizenga.
