= Bill Posey =

American businessman and politician (1947–2026)

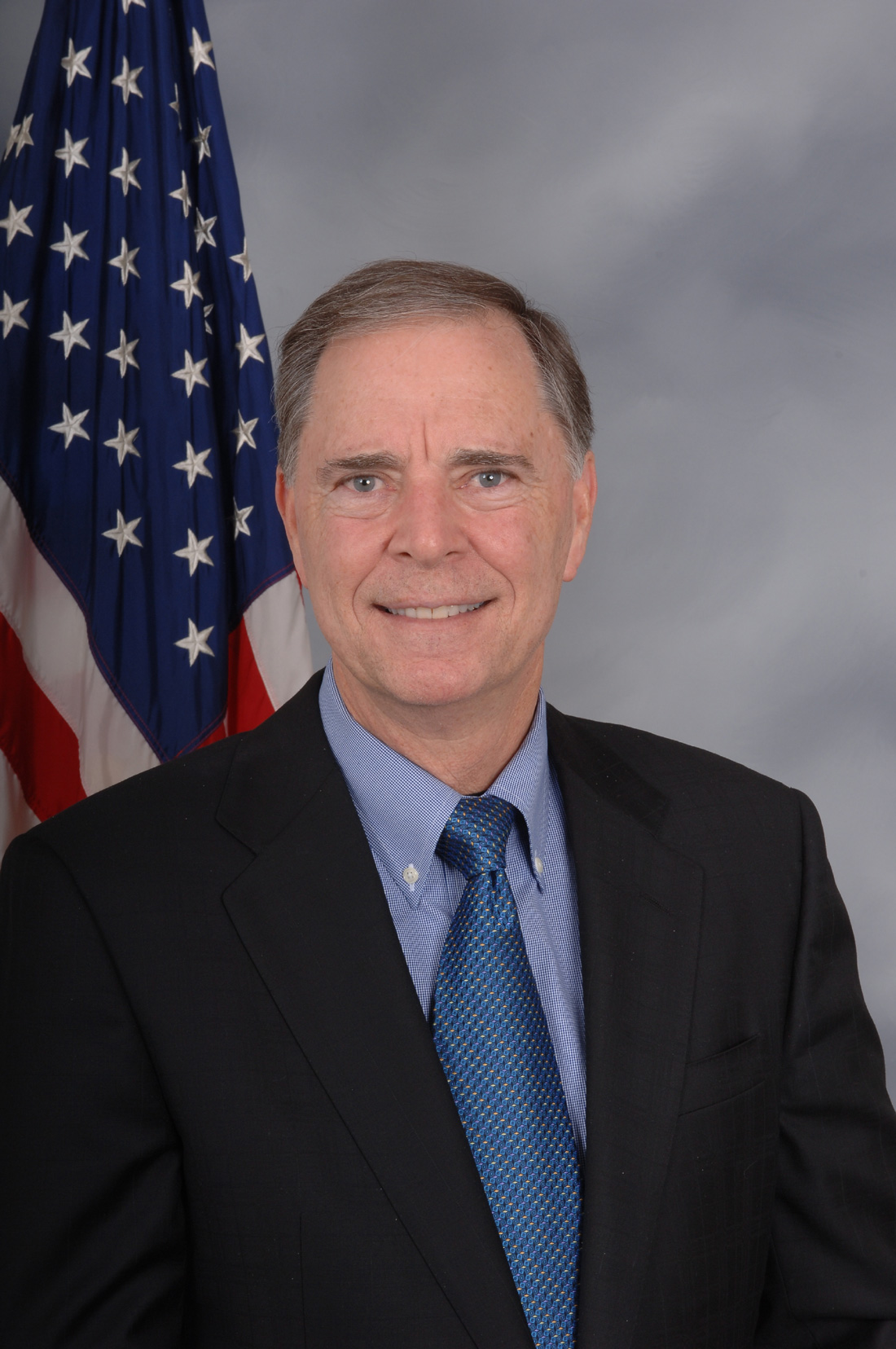
- Official portrait, 2009

Member of the U.S. House of Representatives from Florida
- In office January 3, 2009 – January 3, 2025
- Preceded by: Dave Weldon
- Succeeded by: Mike Haridopolos
- Constituency: 15th district (2009–2013); 8th district (2013–2025)

Member of the Florida Senate
- In office November 7, 2000 – November 4, 2008
- Preceded by: Patsy Ann Kurth
- Succeeded by: Thad Altman
- Constituency: 15th district (2000–2002); 24th district (2002–2008)

Member of the Florida House of Representatives from the 32nd district
- In office November 3, 1992 – November 7, 2000
- Preceded by: Redistricted
- Succeeded by: Bob Allen

Personal details
- Born: William Joseph Posey; December 18, 1947 Washington, D.C., U.S.
- Died: May 9, 2026 (aged 78) Melbourne, Florida, U.S.
- Party: Republican
- Spouse: Katie Ingram (m. 1967)
- Children: 2
- Education: Brevard Community College (AA)
- Posey's voice Posey honoring Alli Majeed, a retiring judge of the Brevard County Court. Recorded January 11, 2017

William Joseph Posey (/ˈpoʊzi/ POH-zee; December 18, 1947 – May 9, 2026) was an American businessman and politician who served as the U.S. representative for Florida's 8th congressional district from 2009 to 2025. A member of the Republican Party, he formerly served in the Florida Senate and the Florida House of Representatives. Posey did not seek reelection to the U.S. House in 2024.

== Early life, education and business career ==
Bill Posey was born in Washington, D.C., the son of Beatrice (née Tohl) and Walter J. Posey. His mother's family immigrated from Russia and is of Jewish heritage and his father was a Protestant of primarily English ancestry. Posey moved to Rockledge, Florida, in 1956 when his father took a job in engineering with McDonnell Douglas, working on the Delta rocket. In 1969, he graduated from Brevard Community College with an Associate of Arts.

Posey got a job with McDonnell Douglas, and worked on the Apollo Space Program at the Kennedy Space Center until he was laid off. From 1974 to 1976, he worked on the Rockledge Planning Commission. In 1976, he was elected a member of the City Council, and from 1986 to 1992, he was a member of the Brevard County Business and Industrial Development Commission. Posey also founded a real estate company during the 1970s, and later became director of the state Association of Realtors. While serving in local politics, he also became a researcher on government accountability and transparency.

== Florida legislature ==
While serving in the state legislature, Posey was a chief sponsor of a bill designed to modernize the Florida election process in response to the 2000 presidential election controversy. He also worked to revise insurance policy so as to aid hurricane victims.

== U.S. House of Representatives ==
=== Elections ===
==== 2008 ====
Posey ran to replace retiring U.S. Representative Dave Weldon, who had held the 15th District seat since 1995, when the district first voted Republican.

Posey defeated Democratic nominee Stephen Blythe with 53.1% of the vote to Blythe's 42.0%.

==== 2010 ====
Posey was reelected over former NASA executive and public administrator Shannon Roberts with 64.7% of the vote to Roberts's 35.3%.

==== 2012 ====
Posey was reelected with 58.9% of the vote over Roberts and nonpartisan candidate Richard Gillmor.

==== 2014 ====
Posey was reelected with 65.84% of the vote over Democratic nominee Gabriel Rothblatt.

==== 2016 ====
Posey was reelected with 63.11% of the vote over Democratic nominee Corry Westbrook.

==== 2018 ====
Posey was reelected with 60.50% of the vote over Democratic nominee Sanjay Patel.

==== 2020 ====
Posey was reelected with 61.36% of the vote over Democratic nominee Jim Kennedy.

==== 2022 ====
Posey was reelected with 64.91% of the vote over Democratic nominee Joanne Terry.

=== Committee assignments ===
For the 118th Congress:

- Committee on Financial Services
  - Subcommittee on Financial Institutions and Monetary Policy
  - Subcommittee on Housing and Insurance
- Committee on Science, Space, and Technology
  - Subcommittee on Environment
  - Subcommittee on Space and Aeronautics

=== Caucus memberships ===
- Liberty Caucus
- Freedom Caucus
- Congressional Arts Caucus
- Congressional Constitution Caucus
- United States Congressional International Conservation Caucus
- Climate Solutions Caucus
- Republican Study Committee
- Rare Disease Caucus

== Political positions ==
=== Birther bill ===
Shortly after entering Congress, Posey introduced legislation (H.R. 1503) to amend the Federal Election Campaign Act of 1971 to require candidates for the presidency "to include with the [campaign] committee's statement of organization a copy of the candidate's birth certificate" and supporting documentation. Introduced without the Republican leadership's knowledge, Florida Today wrote, "Posey meant for his bill to prevent the kind of feckless hysteria that drives the "birthers," people who insist President Barack Obama was born in Kenya or Indonesia". quoting Posey to say "The first rule of open government is transparency," Florida Today also noted that Posey's office "does not question Obama's citizenship." Posey said his motivation was to "prevent something like this from happening in the future" by requiring "the birth certificate up front and take [the issue] off the table". His initiative was strongly criticized by Florida Democrats, who accused him of trying to "fan the rumors on the extreme fringe of the Republican Party" and "pandering to the right wing". Posey said that there was now "no reason to question" that Obama is a U.S. citizen. The 111th Congress never voted on the bill.

=== Space ===
As a former worker at Kennedy Space Center and former Chairman of Space Florida’s predecessor organization, Bill Posey prioritized legislation to promote American leadership in space research, capabilities, and exploration. This focus brought high-paying jobs to Brevard County and the Space Coast as well as promoted U.S. space innovation and leadership and national security.

In 2012 Posey wrote H.R. 4401 – RACE for Space Act (Incorporated into H.R. 4310, National Defense Authorization Act for 2013) which enables commercial space companies to utilize excess DOD space launch infrastructure.

in 2015 Posey wrote H.R. 1508 – Space Resource Exploration and Utilization Act of 2015 (Incorporated into Public Law 114-90 – U.S. Commercial Space Launch Competitiveness Act, Title IV), which Recognizes property rights of U.S. Space Companies who obtain resources on the moon or other celestial bodies. (The first space property rights bill)

in 2016 Posey sponsored H.R. 2726 – Apollo 11 50th Anniversary Commemorative Coin Act, which recognizes and celebrates the 50th Anniversary of the Apollo 11 Moon landing with a Commemorative Coin.

In 2019 Bill Posey co-sponsored H.R.748 - CARES Act including language to protect NASA and defense industry contract jobs and pay which allowed thousands of contract workers at NASA and in the defense industry to continue to be paid rather than laid-off during the Covid-19 pandemic.

=== Environment and energy ===
In 2016, Posey sponsored legislation to reauthorize and reprioritize funding to clean up the United States' estuaries signed into law by President Barack Obama.

At a May 2018 hearing in the Science, Space and Technology Committee, Posey promoted the claim that climate scientists in the 1970s believed the Earth was cooling; expressed skepticism that humans contribute to climate change, asked whether climate change was occurring because carbon dioxide captured in permafrost was now leaking out; and asked whether warming would be beneficial for habitats and to people. Posey said, "I don't think anybody disputes that the Earth is getting warmer; I think what's not clear is the exact amount of who caused what, and getting to that is, I think, where we're trying to go with this committee."

Posey was a Co-Founder and Co-Chair of the Bipartisan Congressional Estuary Caucus, which was formed to educate Congress on the importance of our nation’s estuaries and pass related environmental legislation. “Our Lagoon is important to our quality of life, our local economies, tourism, our natural beauty, and provides a critical habitat to many indigenous species of wildlife and plant life,” Posey stated in a news release issued by his office.

=== Foreign policy ===
In June 2021, Posey was one of 49 House Republicans to vote to repeal the AUMF against Iraq.

Posey was among 19 House Republicans to vote against the final passage of the 2022 National Defense Authorization Act.

In February 2022, Posey co-sponsored the Secure America's Borders First Act, which would prohibit the expenditure or obligation of military and security assistance to Ukariane over the U.S. border with Mexico.

In 2023, Posey was among 47 Republicans to vote in favor of H.Con.Res. 21, which directed President Joe Biden to remove U.S. troops from Syria within 180 days.

In 2024, Posey voted against the $60 billion military aid package for Ukraine. The Washington Post reported that some of the funding would have supported defense jobs in his constituency.

=== Gun law ===
Posey supported legislation that mandates concealed carry permit reciprocity among states.

From 2015 to 2016, Posey accepted $2,000 in direct campaign contributions from the NRA Political Victory Fund; from 2008 to 2016 he accepted $13,500 from NRA political action committees.

Posey was one of the original cosponsors of the Repeal of the Implementation of the NICS Improvement Amendments Act of 2007, which repealed Obama-era legislation aimed at preventing the mentally infirm from legally purchasing firearms.

After the 2017 Las Vegas shooting, Posey expressed support for legislation that would ban bump stocks.

=== Healthcare ===
Posey supported repealing the Affordable Care Act (Obamacare), calling it a "fiasco" that "was passed under a lot of misrepresentation."

=== Net neutrality ===
Posey was the only Republican representative to vote with the Democratic-controlled House for the Save the Internet Act of 2019, which would overturn the Federal Communications Commission's repeal of net neutrality and "restore Obama-era net neutrality protections."

=== Public health ===
Posey was a proponent of the debunked theory that vaccines cause autism. He wrote a foreword for Robert F. Kennedy Jr.'s 2015 book Thimerosal: Let the Science Speak, which espoused the debunked theory that thimerosal causes autism.

=== Tax reform ===
in 2015, Posey wrote H.R.1478 - Policyholder Protection Act which protects personal insurance policies from being raided to bail-out financial firms. This was incorporated into the H.R.2029 - Consolidated Appropriations Act of 2016.

Posey voted for the Tax Cuts and Jobs Act of 2017.

In 2017 Posey wrote H.R. 2721 – Seniors’ Tax Simplification Act (Incorporated into H.R.1892 - Bipartisan Budget Act of 2018) which directed the IRS to create a new tax filing form for senior citizens (65+) who do not have complicated taxes – including Social Security, distributions from retirement plans, annuities, interest and dividends, or capital gains or losses.

=== Immigration ===
Posey sponsored H.R. 6202, the American Tech Workforce Act of 2021, introduced by Representative Jim Banks. The legislation would establish a wage floor for the high-skill H-1B visa program, thereby significantly reducing employer dependence on the program. The bill would also eliminate the Optional Practical Training program that allows foreign graduates to stay and work in the United States.

=== Fiscal Responsibility Act of 2023 ===
Posey was among the 71 House Republicans who voted against final passage of the Fiscal Responsibility Act of 2023.

== Personal life and death ==
Posey and his wife, Katie, had two daughters together.

Posey died at a hospital in Melbourne, Florida, on May 9, 2026, at the age of 78.

U.S. House of Representatives
Preceded by Dave Weldon	Member of the U.S. House of Representatives from Florida's 15th congressional district 2009–2013	Succeeded by Dennis A. Ross
Preceded by Daniel Webster	Member of the U.S. House of Representatives from Florida's 8th congressional district 2013–2025	Succeeded by Mike Haridopolos
