= United States House Financial Services Subcommittee on Capital Markets =

US House of Representatives subcommittee

Subcommittee of Committee on Financial Services
- Active United States House of Representatives; 119th Congress

Leadership
- Chair: Ann Wagner (R)
- Ranking Member: Brad Sherman (D)

Structure
- Seats: 25 (24 currently filled) 14/14 10/11
- Political parties: Majority (14): Republican (14); Minority (10): Democratic (10)

Meeting place
- 2129, Rayburn House Office Building; Washington, D.C. 20515

Phone number
- (202)-225-7502

The U.S. House Financial Services Subcommittee on Capital Markets is a subcommittee of the House Committee on Financial Services. It was previously known as the Subcommittee on Investor Protection, Entrepreneurship and Capital Markets.

== Jurisdiction ==
The subcommittee reviews laws and programs related to the U.S. capital markets, the securities industry, and government-sponsored enterprises, such as Fannie Mae and Freddie Mac. It also oversees the Securities and Exchange Commission and self-regulatory organizations, such as the New York Stock Exchange and the Financial Industry Regulatory Authority, that police the securities markets.

In 2001 the jurisdiction over insurance was transferred to the then-House Banking and Financial Services Committee from the House Energy and Commerce Committee. Since that time it has been the purview of the Subcommittee on Capital Markets, Insurance and Government Sponsored Enterprises. But "with plans to reform Fannie Mae and Freddie Mac expected to take up much of that panel's agenda, insurance instead [was] moved to a new Subcommittee on Insurance, Housing and Community Opportunity [as of the 112th Congress]."

== Members, 119th Congress ==
Majority	Minority
Ann Wagner, Missouri, Chair; Andrew Garbarino, New York, Vice Chair; Frank Lucas, Oklahoma; Pete Sessions, Texas; Warren Davidson, Ohio; Bryan Steil, Wisconsin; Marlin Stutzman, Indiana; Mike Lawler, New York; Andy Ogles, Tennessee; Zach Nunn, Iowa; Lisa McClain, Michigan; María Elvira Salazar, Florida; Troy Downing, Montana; Mike Haridopolos, Florida	Brad Sherman, California, Ranking Member; Gregory Meeks, New York; David Scott, Georgia (until April 22, 2026); Juan Vargas, California; Vicente Gonzalez, Texas; Sean Casten, Illinois; Stephen Lynch, Massachusetts; Emanuel Cleaver, Missouri; Josh Gottheimer, New Jersey; Cleo Fields, Louisiana; Janelle Bynum, Oregon
Ex officio
French Hill, Arkansas	Maxine Waters, California

== Historical membership rosters ==
=== 118th Congress ===
Majority	Minority
Ann Wagner, Missouri, Chair; Frank Lucas, Oklahoma; Pete Sessions, Texas; Bill Huizenga, Michigan; French Hill, Arkansas; Tom Emmer, Minnesota; Alex Mooney, West Virginia; Bryan Steil, Wisconsin; Dan Meuser, Pennsylvania; Andrew Garbarino, New York, Vice Chair; Mike Lawler, New York; Zach Nunn, Iowa; Erin Houchin, Indiana	Brad Sherman, California, Ranking Member; Gregory Meeks, New York; David Scott, Georgia; Juan Vargas, California; Josh Gottheimer, New Jersey; Vicente Gonzalez, Texas; Sean Casten, Illinois; Wiley Nickel, California; Stephen Lynch, Massachusetts; Emanuel Cleaver, Missouri
Ex officio
Patrick McHenry, North Carolina	Maxine Waters, California

=== 117th Congress ===
Majority	Minority
Brad Sherman, California, Chair; Carolyn Maloney, New York; David Scott, Georgia; Jim Himes, Connecticut; Bill Foster, Illinois; Gregory Meeks, New York; Juan Vargas, California; Josh Gottheimer, New Jersey; Vicente Gonzalez, Texas; Michael San Nicolas, Guam; Cindy Axne, Iowa; Sean Casten, Illinois, Vice Chair; Emanuel Cleaver, Missouri	Bill Huizenga, Michigan, Ranking Member; Steve Stivers, Ohio; Ann Wagner, Missouri; French Hill, Arkansas; Tom Emmer, Minnesota; Alex Mooney, West Virginia; Warren Davidson, Ohio; Trey Hollingsworth, Indiana, Vice Ranking Member; Anthony Gonzalez, Ohio; Bryan Steil, Wisconsin
Ex officio
Maxine Waters, California	Patrick McHenry, North Carolina

=== 116th Congress ===
Majority	Minority
Brad Sherman, California, Chair; Carolyn Maloney, New York; David Scott, Georgia; Jim Himes, Connecticut; Bill Foster, Illinois; Gregory Meeks, New York; Juan Vargas, California; Josh Gottheimer, New Jersey; Vicente Gonzalez, Texas; Michael San Nicolas, Guam; Katie Porter, California; Cindy Axne, Iowa; Sean Casten, Illinois; Alexandria Ocasio-Cortez, New York	Bill Huizenga, Michigan, Ranking Member; Peter T. King, New York; Sean Duffy, Wisconsin; Steve Stivers, Ohio; Ann Wagner, Missouri; French Hill, Arkansas; Tom Emmer, Minnesota; Alex Mooney, West Virginia; Warren Davidson, Ohio; Trey Hollingsworth, Indiana, Vice Ranking Member
Ex officio
Maxine Waters, California	Patrick McHenry, North Carolina

=== 115th Congress ===
Majority	Minority
Bill Huizenga, Michigan, Chairman; Randy Hultgren, Illinois, Vice Chair; Peter T. King, New York; Patrick McHenry, North Carolina; Sean Duffy, Wisconsin; Steve Stivers, Ohio; Ann Wagner, Missouri; Luke Messer, Indiana; Bruce Poliquin, Maine; French Hill, Arkansas; Tom Emmer, Minnesota; Alex Mooney, West Virginia; Tom MacArthur, New Jersey; Warren Davidson, Ohio; Ted Budd, North Carolina; Trey Hollingsworth, Indiana	Carolyn Maloney, New York, Ranking Member; Brad Sherman, California; Stephen Lynch, Massachusetts; David Scott, Georgia; Jim Himes, Connecticut; Keith Ellison, Minnesota; Bill Foster, Illinois; Gregory Meeks, New York; Kyrsten Sinema, Arizona; Juan Vargas, California; Josh Gottheimer, New Jersey; Ed Perlmutter, Colorado; Vicente Gonzalez, Texas
Ex officio
Jeb Hensarling, Texas	Maxine Waters, California
