= Sylvia Garcia =

American lawyer and politician (born 1950)

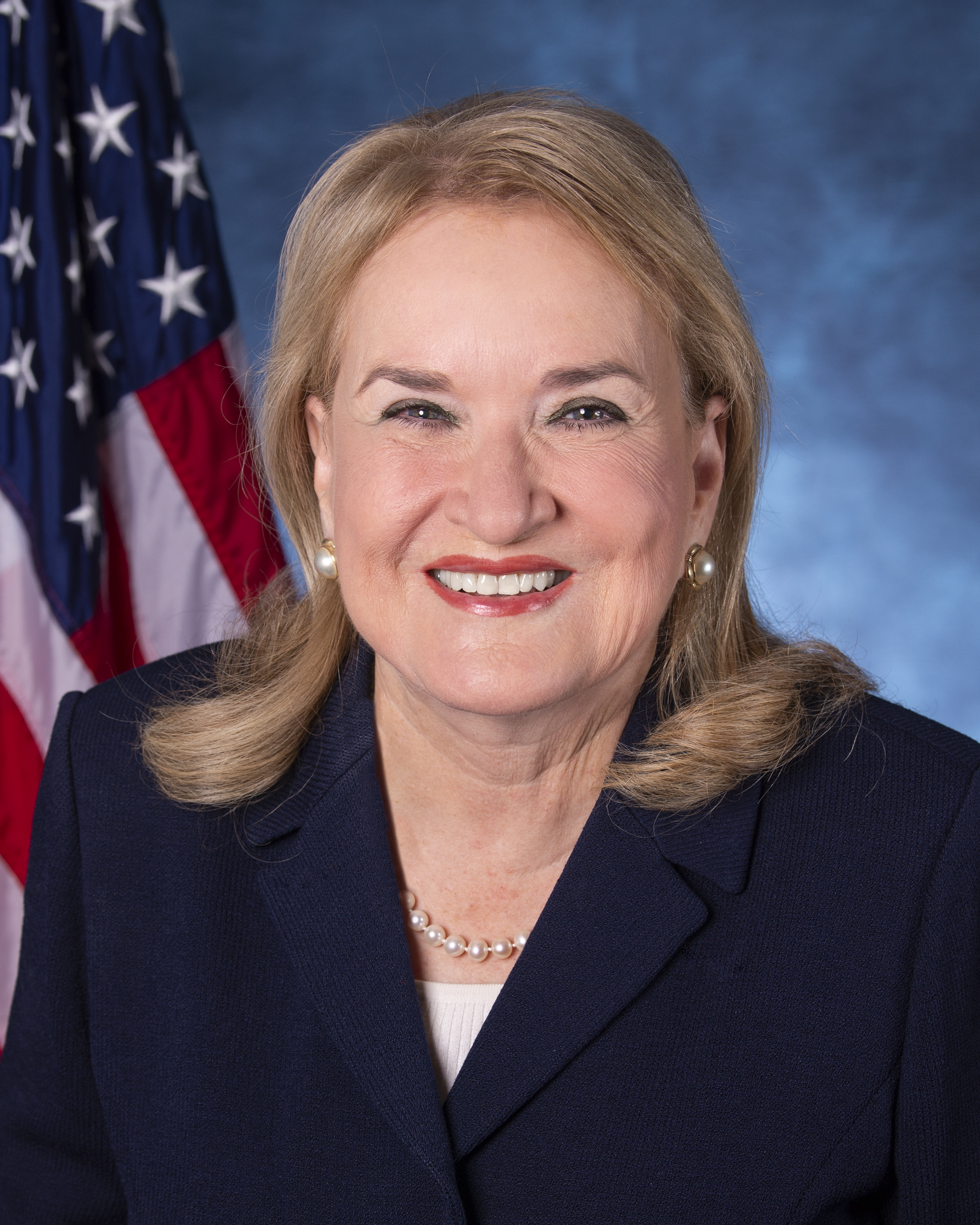
- Official portrait, 2019

Member of the U.S. House of Representatives from Texas's 29th district
- Incumbent
- Assumed office January 3, 2019
- Preceded by: Gene Green

Member of the Texas Senate from the 6th district
- In office March 11, 2013 – November 9, 2018
- Preceded by: Mario Gallegos Jr.
- Succeeded by: Carol Alvarado

Member of the Harris County Commission from Precinct 2
- In office January 1, 2003 – January 1, 2011
- Preceded by: Jim Fontento
- Succeeded by: Jack Morman

12th City Controller of Houston
- In office January 2, 1998 – January 1, 2003
- Preceded by: Lloyd Kelly
- Succeeded by: Judy Gray Johnson

Personal details
- Born: Sylvia Rodriguez Garcia; September 6, 1950 (age 75) San Diego, Texas, U.S.
- Party: Democratic
- Education: Texas Woman's University (BA); Texas Southern University (JD)
- Website: House website Campaign website

Sylvia Rodriguez Garcia (born September 6, 1950) is an American lawyer and politician who has been serving as the U.S. representative for Texas's 29th congressional district since 2019. Her district covers much of eastern Houston. A member of the Democratic Party, she previously represented the 6th district in the Texas Senate.

== Early life and education ==
Sylvia Rodriguez Garcia was born in San Diego, Texas, and raised in Palito Blanco in west central Jim Wells County, the daughter of Luis and Antonia Rodriguez Garcia. She is the eighth of ten children. Her family are Mexican Americans.

After graduating from Ben Bolt-Palito Blanco High School, Garcia attended Texas Woman's University on a scholarship. She graduated with a degree in social work and began a career as a social worker. She later received her Juris Doctor degree from Texas Southern University Thurgood Marshall School of Law and was licensed to practice law in Texas.

== Early political career ==
=== City of Houston ===
In the early 1980s, Houston Mayor Kathryn Whitmire appointed Garcia as presiding judge of the Houston Municipal System. She served for an unprecedented five terms under two mayors.

In 1998, Garcia became Houston city controller.

=== Harris County ===
Garcia was elected to the Harris County Commissioner's Court in 2002. She was the first woman and first Latina elected to that post in her own right. Her precinct featured a major base of operations for NASA, the nation's largest petrochemical complex, the Houston Ship Channel and the Port of Houston, the sixth largest port in the world.

In 2010, Garcia was defeated for reelection to the Harris County Commissioner's Court by Republican Jack Morman.

== Texas Senate ==
In 2013, Garcia defeated State Representative Carol Alvarado in a special election runoff to replace the late state Senator Mario Gallegos.

Garcia took the oath of office for state senator on March 11, 2013. She served on the Criminal Justice, Intergovernmental Relations, Natural Resources and Economic Development, and Transportation committees. Garcia ran unopposed in the 2016 general election. She resigned after winning election to the U.S. House effective November 9, 2018.

== U. S. House of Representatives ==
=== Elections ===
==== 1992 ====
While still serving as a municipal judge, Garcia ran in the Democratic primary for the newly created 29th congressional seat in 1992. She finished third in the five-way primary behind City Councilman Ben Reyes and State Senator Gene Green. Green won the runoff and held the seat for 26 years.

==== 2018 ====
Green announced his retirement in November 2017, and Garcia—who by then held the state senate seat Green once held—entered a crowded seven-way Democratic primary. The district was still a Democratic stronghold, and it was taken for granted that whoever won the primary would be overwhelmingly favored in November. Garcia got a significant boost when Green endorsed her, saying, "she's a legislator, and that's what a member of Congress should be." She won the primary with 63% of the vote. Her Republican opponent, Phillip Aronoff, used sexual harassment and wrongful termination allegations against Garcia. Garcia handily won the November 6 general election. She and Veronica Escobar became the first Latina congresswomen from Texas, and Garcia is the first woman to represent the district. Garcia is also the first Hispanic to represent a significant portion of Houston in Congress.

==== 2020 ====
Garcia won reelection in 2020, defeating Republican Jaimy Blanco.

=== Tenure ===
On January 15, 2020, Garcia was selected as one of seven House impeachment managers who presented the impeachment case against President Donald Trump during his trial before the United States Senate.

=== Committee assignments ===
- Committee on Financial Services
  - Subcommittee on Diversity and Inclusion
  - Subcommittee on Oversight and Investigations
- Committee on the Judiciary
  - Subcommittee on the Constitution, Civil Rights and Civil Liberties
  - Subcommittee on Immigration and Citizenship

=== Caucus memberships ===
- Black Maternal Health Caucus
- Congressional Hispanic Caucus
- Congressional Equality Caucus
- Congressional Homelessness Caucus
- Congressional Progressive Caucus
- Congressional Pro-Choice Caucus
- Congressional Mental Health Caucus
- Congressional Social Work Caucus
- Congressional Diabetes Caucus
- Adoption Caucus
- Congressional Bipartisan HBCU Caucus
- Congressional Coalition on Adoption
- Congressional Caucus for the Equal Rights Amendment

== Electoral history ==
Texas's 29th congressional district Democratic primary results, 2018
Party	Candidate	Votes	%
Democratic	Sylvia Garcia	11,659	63.2
Democratic	Tahir Javed	3,817	20.7
Democratic	Roel Garcia	1,217	6.6
Democratic	Hector Morales	562	3.0
Democratic	Augustine H. Reyes	524	2.8
Democratic	Dominique Michelle Garcia	472	2.6
Democratic	Pedro Valencia	192	1.1
Total votes		18,443	100.0

Texas's 29th congressional district, 2018
Party	Candidate	Votes	%
Democratic	Sylvia Garcia	88,188	75.1
Republican	Phillip Aronoff	28,098	23.9
Libertarian	Cullen Burns	1,199	1.0
Independent	Johnathan Garza (write-in)	9	0.0
Total votes		117,494	100.0
Democratic hold			

Texas's 29th congressional district, 2020
Party	Candidate	Votes	%
Democratic	Sylvia Garcia (incumbent)	111,305	71.1
Republican	Jaimy Blanco	42,840	27.4
Libertarian	Phil Kurtz	2,328	1.5
Total votes		156,473	100.0
Democratic hold			

Texas's 29th congressional district, 2022
Party	Candidate	Votes	%
Democratic	Sylvia Garcia (incumbent)	71,837	71.4
Republican	Robert Schafranek	28,765	28.5
Total votes		100,602	100.0
Democratic hold			

Texas's 29th congressional district, 2024
Party	Candidate	Votes	%
Democratic	Sylvia Garcia (incumbent)	99,379	65.3
Republican	Alan Garza	52,830	34.7
Total votes		152,209	100.0
Democratic hold			

== Positions ==
Garcia voted with President Joe Biden's stated position 100% of the time in the 117th Congress, according to a FiveThirtyEight analysis.

=== LGBT rights ===
Garcia supports the Equality Act, a bill that would expand the federal Civil Rights Act of 1964 to ban discrimination based on sexual orientation and gender identity. She voted for it in 2019.

=== Disaster relief ===
In 2024, Garcia publicly asked CenterPoint Energy why more than 1 million Houston residents were without power following the impact of Hurricane Beryl.

=== Immigration ===
Garcia sponsored the American Dream and Promise Act.

== Personal life ==
Garcia is Roman Catholic.

== See also ==
- List of Hispanic and Latino American jurists
- List of Hispanic and Latino Americans in the United States Congress
- Women in the United States House of Representatives

U.S. House of Representatives
Preceded by Gene Green	Member of the U.S. House of Representatives from Texas's 29th congressional district 2019–present	Incumbent
U.S. order of precedence (ceremonial)
Preceded by Chuy García	United States representatives by seniority 202nd	Succeeded by Jared Golden
