= P.L. 115–8 =

2017 legislation in the U.S. House

Repeal of the "Implementation of the NICS Improvement Amendments Act of 2007"
- Long title: Joint resolution providing for congressional disapproval under chapter 8 of title 5, United States Code, of the rule submitted by the Social Security Administration relating to Implementation of the NICS Improvement Amendments Act of 2007.
- Enacted by: the 115th United States Congress
- Effective: February 28, 2017

Citations
- Public law: Pub. L. 115–8 (text) (PDF)

Legislative history
- Introduced in the House as H.J.R.40 by Rep. Sam Johnson (R-TX) on January 30, 2017; Committee consideration by House Judiciary Committee; Passed the House on February 2, 2017 (235-180); Passed the Senate on February 15, 2017 (57-43); Signed into law by President Donald Trump on February 28, 2017

The Repeal of the "Implementation of the NICS Improvement Amendments Act of 2007" (Pub. L. 115–8 (text) (PDF), H.J.Res. 40) was legislation introduced in the United States House of Representatives on January 30, 2017, by Representative Sam Johnson of Texas. The bill repeals a rule issued by the Social Security Administration that would have required Federal agencies to identify individuals who receive disability insurance benefits under Title II of the Social Security Act or Supplemental Security Income and have been "determination by a court, board, commission, or other lawful authority that a person, as a result of marked subnormal intelligence, or mental illness, incompetency, condition, or disease: (1) Is a danger to himself or to others; or (2) Lacks the mental capacity to contract or manage his own affairs." in order to potentially prohibit such individuals from purchasing firearms or from having other purchase firearms on their behalf. The repeal was signed into law by President Donald Trump on February 28, 2017.

== Background ==
On December 19, 2016, during the Presidential transition of Donald Trump, the Social Security Administration issued the Implementation of the NICS Improvement Amendments Act of 2007 (81 FR 91702). The rule reads in part:

We will identify, on a prospective basis, individuals who receive Disability Insurance benefits under title II of the Social Security Act (Act) or Supplemental Security Income (SSI) payments under title XVI of the Act and who also meet certain other criteria, including an award of benefits based on a finding that the individual's mental impairment meets or medically equals the requirements of section 12.00 of the Listing of Impairments (Listings) and receipt of benefits through a representative payee. We will provide pertinent information about these individuals to the Attorney General on not less than a quarterly basis. As required by the NIAA, at the commencement of the adjudication process we will also notify individuals, both orally and in writing, of their possible Federal prohibition on possessing or receiving firearms, the consequences of such prohibition, the criminal penalties for violating the Gun Control Act, and the availability of relief from the prohibition on the receipt or possession of firearms imposed by Federal law.

— Social Security Administration,

The rule would have required that the Social Security Administration report certain recipients found to be disabled to the United States Attorney General in order for them to be added to the National Instant Criminal Background Check System. To qualify for reporting, an individual would have had to meet all of the following requirements:

- has filed a claim for Social Security or SSI benefits based on a disability
- has been determined to have an impairment (or combination of impairments) that meets or medically equals the criteria of one of the mental disorders specified in SSA's Listing of Impairments (Step 3 of the disability determination process)
- has a primary diagnosis code based on a mental impairment
- has attained age 18 but not yet attained Social Security's full retirement age
- has had a representative payee appointed because he or she has been determined by SSA to be mentally incapable of managing benefit payments

It was estimated that around 9% of the disability awardee population would have met these criteria (75,000 individuals annually).

== Support and opposition ==
The bill was supported by the National Rifle Association of America, the American Civil Liberties Union, the National Association for Mental Health, the American Association of People with Disabilities, the National Council on Disability, the National Alliance on Mental Illness, and the Consortium for Citizens with Disabilities, as well as other disability rights advocates. The initial regulation was supported by the Brady Campaign to Prevent Gun Violence, Moms Demand Action Against Gun Violence, Democratic gun control advocates, and some mental health experts.

== Passage ==
On February 2, 2017, the repeal was debated and passed in the House. The final vote was 235–180, and was tabulated mostly along party lines. 229 Republicans and 6 Democrats voted in favor, while 2 Republicans and 178 Democrats voted against.

The United States Senate passed the repeal on February 15, 2017. Democrats Joe Donnelly of Indiana, Heidi Heitkamp of North Dakota, Joe Manchin of West Virginia, along with Independent Angus King of Maine, joined with all the Republicans in approving the bill.

The repeal was signed into law by President Donald Trump on February 28, 2017.

== See also ==
- Gun politics in the United States
