= John Rose (Tennessee politician) =

American politician (born 1965)

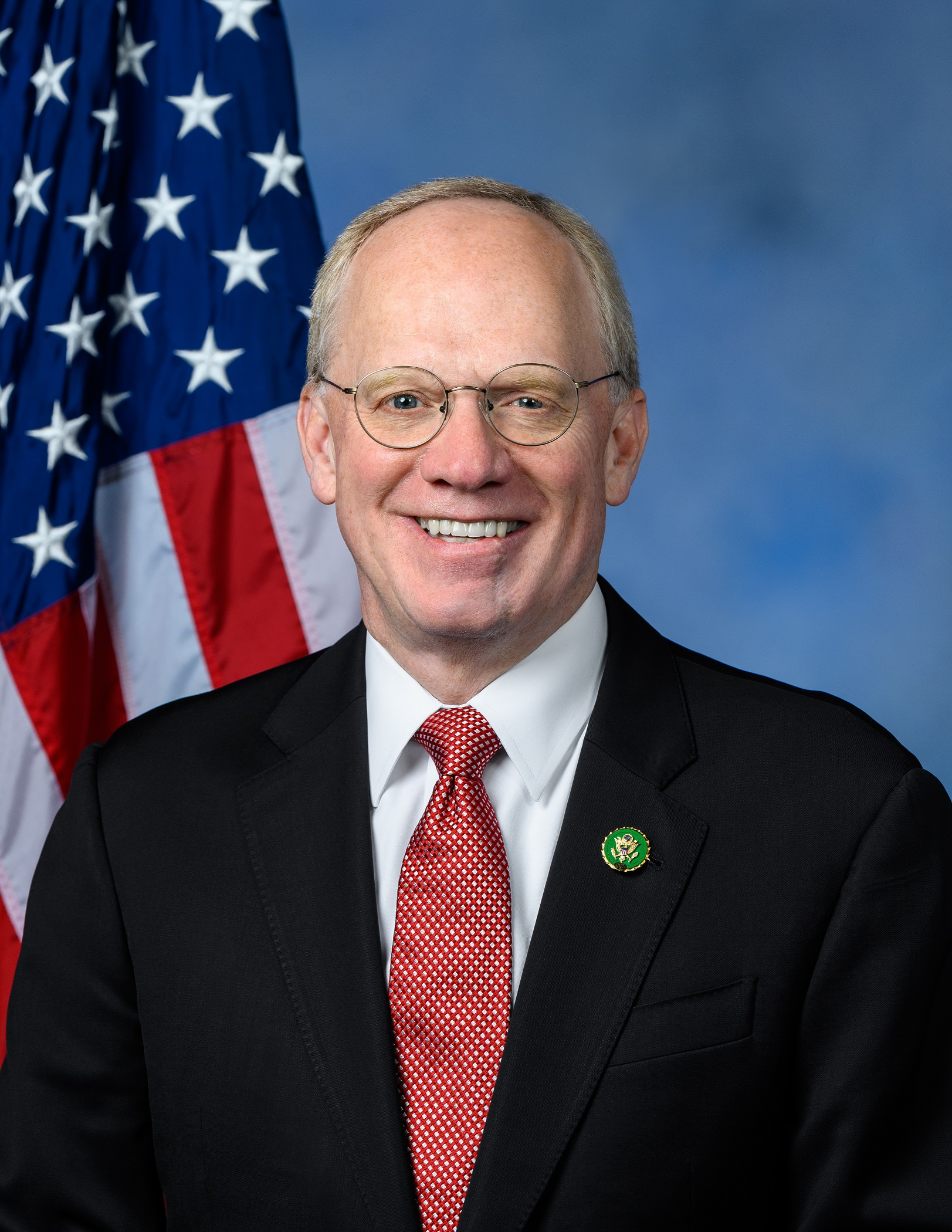
- Official portrait, 2023

Member of the U.S. House of Representatives from Tennessee's 6th district
- Incumbent
- Assumed office January 3, 2019
- Preceded by: Diane Black

33rd Agriculture Commissioner of Tennessee
- In office August 1, 2002 – January 18, 2003
- Governor: Don Sundquist
- Preceded by: Dan Wheeler
- Succeeded by: Ken Givens

Personal details
- Born: John Williams Rose; February 23, 1965 (age 61) Cookeville, Tennessee, U.S.
- Party: Republican
- Spouse: Chelsea Doss (m. 2011)
- Children: 3 (Note: One child is deceased.)
- Education: Tennessee Technological University (BS); Purdue University (MS); Vanderbilt University (JD)
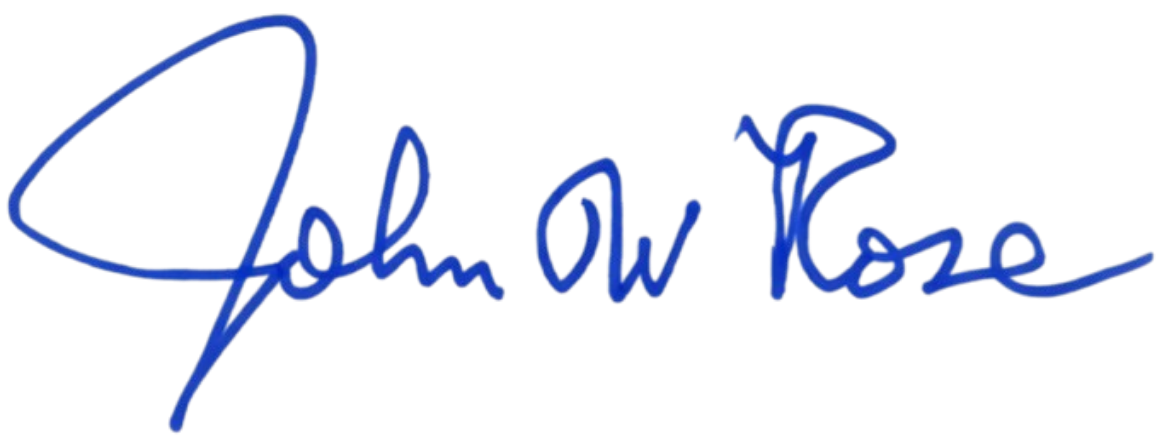
- Signature
- Website: House website Campaign website

John Williams Rose (born February 23, 1965) is an American politician and businessman serving as the U.S. representative for Tennessee's 6th congressional district since 2019. A member of the Republican Party, he previously served as the 33rd agriculture commissioner of Tennessee from 2002 to 2003.

Rose was a candidate for the Republican nomination for Governor of Tennessee in the 2026 gubernatorial election.

== Early life and education ==
Rose was born and raised in Cookeville, Tennessee, and earned a Bachelor of Science in agribusiness economics from Tennessee Tech in 1988, a Master of Science in agricultural economics from Purdue University in 1990, and a J.D. from Vanderbilt University Law School. His ancestry in Tennessee traces back eight generations.

== Career ==
In 1992, Rose co-founded Transcender Corp., a provider of online information technology certification products that was sold in October 2000 for $60 million. Rose owns and is the president of Boson Software, LLC, which trains IT professionals.

Rose served as commissioner of agriculture for Tennessee in 2002.

== U.S. House of Representatives ==
=== Elections ===
==== 2018 ====
On August 2, 2018, Rose won the Republican primary for the 6th Congressional District after Diane Black vacated the seat to run for governor. He defeated Dawn Barlow in the November 6 general election with more than 70% of the vote. After being elected, Rose hired former Representative Van Hilleary as his chief of staff.

==== 2020 ====
Rose won a second term with 73.7% of the vote, defeating Democratic nominee Christopher Finley. He was unopposed in the primary election.

==== 2022 ====
Rose won a third term with 66.3% of the vote, defeating Democratic nominee Randal Cooper.

=== Tenure ===
In May 2019, Rose blocked a vote during a pro forma session of Congress on a $19.1 billion relief bill intended to deliver aid to areas of the U.S. affected by natural disasters the previous year. He cited the national deficit and the vote being held during a Congressional break as reasons for his objection.

In December 2020, Rose was one of 126 Republican members of the House of Representatives to sign an amicus brief in support of Texas v. Pennsylvania, a lawsuit filed at the United States Supreme Court contesting the results of the 2020 presidential election, in which Joe Biden defeated incumbent Donald Trump. In January 2021, Rose was one of 147 Republicans in Congress and 139 in the House to vote to object to the certification of the results of the election.

In June 2021, Rose was one of 21 House Republicans to vote against a resolution to give the Congressional Gold Medal to the United States Capitol Police officers who were on duty during the 2021 United States Capitol attack. He said it was too soon to award the medals and there was not yet enough information about the events on January 6. As a result, the Republican Accountability Project gave him a score of F.

In 2022, Rose was one of 39 Republicans to vote for the Merger Filing Fee Modernization Act of 2021, an antitrust package that would crack down on corporations for anti-competitive behavior.

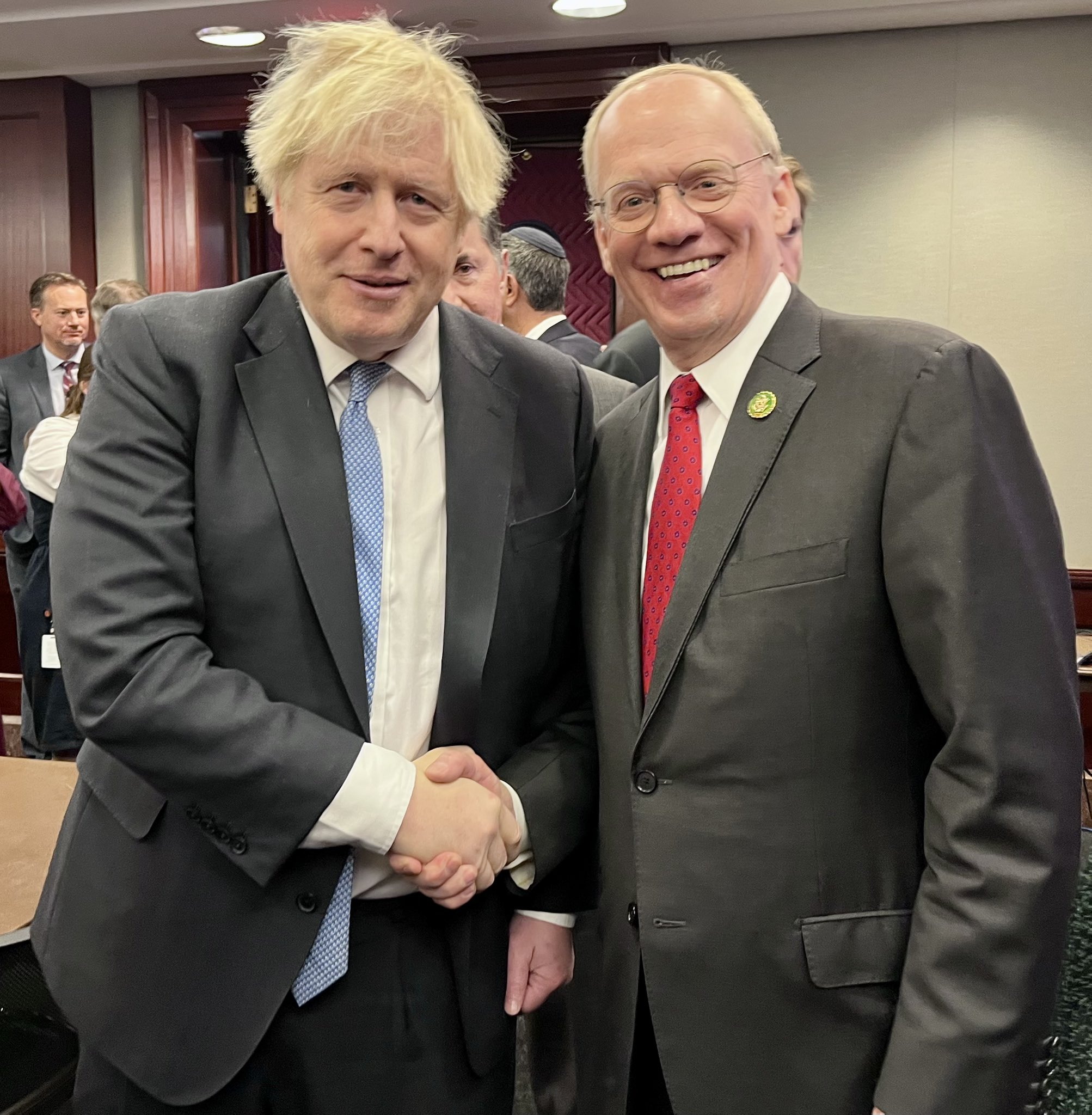
Rose with former U.K. prime minister Boris Johnson in 2023

Rose was among the 71 Republicans who voted against final passage of the Fiscal Responsibility Act of 2023 in the House.

In October 2024, The Tennessee Journal reported that Rose would announce a 2026 campaign for Governor of Tennessee shortly after the 2024 general election. He officially announced his candidacy on March 20, 2025, at an event in Wilson County.

=== Committee assignments ===
For the 119th Congress:

- Committee on Agriculture
  - Subcommittee on Commodity Markets, Digital Assets, and Rural Development (Vice Chair)
  - Subcommittee on Conservation, Research, and Biotechnology
  - Subcommittee on General Farm Commodities, Risk Management, and Credit
- Committee on Financial Services
  - Subcommittee on Digital Assets, Financial Technology, and Artificial Intelligence
  - Subcommittee on Financial Institutions
  - Subcommittee on Housing and Insurance

=== Caucus memberships ===
- Republican Study Committee

== Political positions ==
Rose identifies as a lifelong conservative and a strong supporter of President Donald Trump, and supports furthering his agenda.

=== Guns and crime ===
Rose identifies as a strong supporter of Second Amendment rights. He is also critical of how CoreCivic has operated prisons in Tennessee, but is not opposed to using private prisons. He also supports the death penalty. He also supports deploying the National Guard to high crime areas, believing that it helps reduce crime.

=== Education ===
Rose states that he supports parents being able to decide whether they want to send their children to public, private, or charter schools, or to homeschool their children. However, he has called for more transparency on private school vouchers in Tennessee. He also believes that public school districts should be monitored to ensure they are adequately educating their students, and that the commissioner of the Tennessee Department of Education should have experience teaching in Tennessee public schools. Rose also supports states taking over the function of the U.S. Department of Education.

=== Immigration ===
Rose was very critical of the immigration policies of President Joe Biden. Rose believes states should actively assist in cracking down on illegal immigration, including Section 287(g) agreements with federal law enforcement agencies. He believes that all county and city governments should be required to cooperate with Immigration and Customs Enforcement, and supports prohibiting students who are unlawfully present in the United States from attending public schools.

=== Affordability, housing, and taxes ===
Rose opposes allowing investment firms to buy up housing and convert them to rentals, and blames this for exacerbating housing affordability issues. He also strongly supports property tax reform, and considers property taxes to be another major contributor to affordability issues. He has stated that he supports cutting taxes "anywhere I can", and has expressed openness to reforming the state grocery tax. Rose also believes that addiction is a major cause of homelessness and supports treatment for people struggling with substance abuse. He opposes raising the state minimum wage, believing that doing so contributes to inflation.

=== Business and incentives ===
He opposes incentivizing "woke companies" to come to Tennessee and has been very critical of many corporate incentives given by the state government to large companies. He has also stated that he disagrees with many fellow Republicans on the use of corporate incentives and believes that many incentive packages prioritize corporate executives over taxpayers, small businesses, and communities.

=== Infrastructure and energy ===
Rose supports widening Tennessee's Interstate Highways and coming up with new methods and funding formulas to address the state's backlog in road projects and maintenance. He also supports investment in nuclear energy, particularly at Oak Ridge National Laboratory.

=== Religion ===
Rose has stated that he believes the United States was founded as a Christian nation. He believes that public schools should be permitted to teach about the Bible's influence and history, but opposes establishing a state religion and forcing public school students to participate in compulsory religious activity.

=== Abortion and healthcare ===
Rose opposes abortion and believes the procedure should be outlawed under most circumstances. Rose also supports efforts to stop rural hospital closures and improve healthcare opportunities in rural areas. He supports policies to recruit additional medical professionals to areas where they are needed and to expand and strengthen addiction and mental health treatment.

== Electoral history ==
Republican primary results, 2018
Party	Candidate	Votes	%
Republican	John Rose	43,788	41.3
Republican	Bob Corlew	33,088	31.2
Republican	Judd Matheny	16,753	15.9
Republican	Lavern Vivio	9,506	9
Republican	Christopher Monday	3,021	2.9
Total votes		106,156	100

Tennessee's 6th congressional district, 2018
Party	Candidate	Votes	%
Republican	John Rose	172,810	69.5
Democratic	Dawn Barlow	70,370	28.3
Independent	David Ross	3,426	1.4
Independent	Lloyd Dunn	2,134	.8
Total votes		248,740	100

Republican primary results, 2020
Party	Candidate	Votes	%
Republican	John Rose (incumbent)	78,340	100.0
Total votes		78,340	100.0

Tennessee's 6th congressional district, 2020
Party	Candidate	Votes	%
Republican	John Rose (incumbent)	257,572	73.7
Democratic	Christopher Finley	83,852	24.0
Independent	Christopher Monday	8,154	2.3
Total votes		349,578	100.0
Republican hold			

Republican Primary Results, 2022
Party	Candidate	Votes	%
Republican	John Rose (incumbent)	57,162	100.0
Total votes		57,162	100.0

Tennessee's 6th congressional district, 2022
Party	Candidate	Votes	%
Republican	John Rose (incumbent)	129,388	66.33%
Democratic	Randal Cooper	65,675	33.67%
Total votes		195,063	100.0%
Republican hold			

Republican primary results, 2024
Party	Candidate	Votes	%
Republican	John Rose (incumbent)	38,607	100.00%
Total votes		38,607	100.00%

Tennessee's 6th congressional district, 2024
Party	Candidate	Votes	%
Republican	John Rose (incumbent)	225,543	68.00%
Democratic	Lore Bergman	106,144	32.00%
Total votes		331,687	100.00%
Republican hold			

== Nonprofit work ==
Rose has chaired the Tennessee State Fair Association since its founding in 2010. He has also served on Tennessee Tech Foundation's board of directors and as chair of the Tennessee Future Farmers of America Foundation.

Rose established the Jerry and Betty Williams Rose Scholarship for agricultural students at Tennessee Tech in memory of his parents.

== Personal life ==
Rose and his wife Chelsea (née Doss) married in January 2011. They live in Cookeville, Tennessee, with their two sons. (Note: A third child is deceased.) He owns a family century farm in rural Temperance Hall, west of Cookeville.

== Notes ==
Political offices
Preceded by Dan Wheeler	Agriculture Commissioner of Tennessee; 2002–2003	Succeeded by Ken Givens
U.S. House of Representatives
Preceded by Diane Black	Member of the U.S. House of Representatives from Tennessee's 6th congressional district 2019–present	Incumbent
U.S. order of precedence (ceremonial)
Preceded by Guy Reschenthaler	United States representatives by seniority 222nd	Succeeded by Chip Roy
