= Dennis Ross (politician) =

American politician (born 1959)

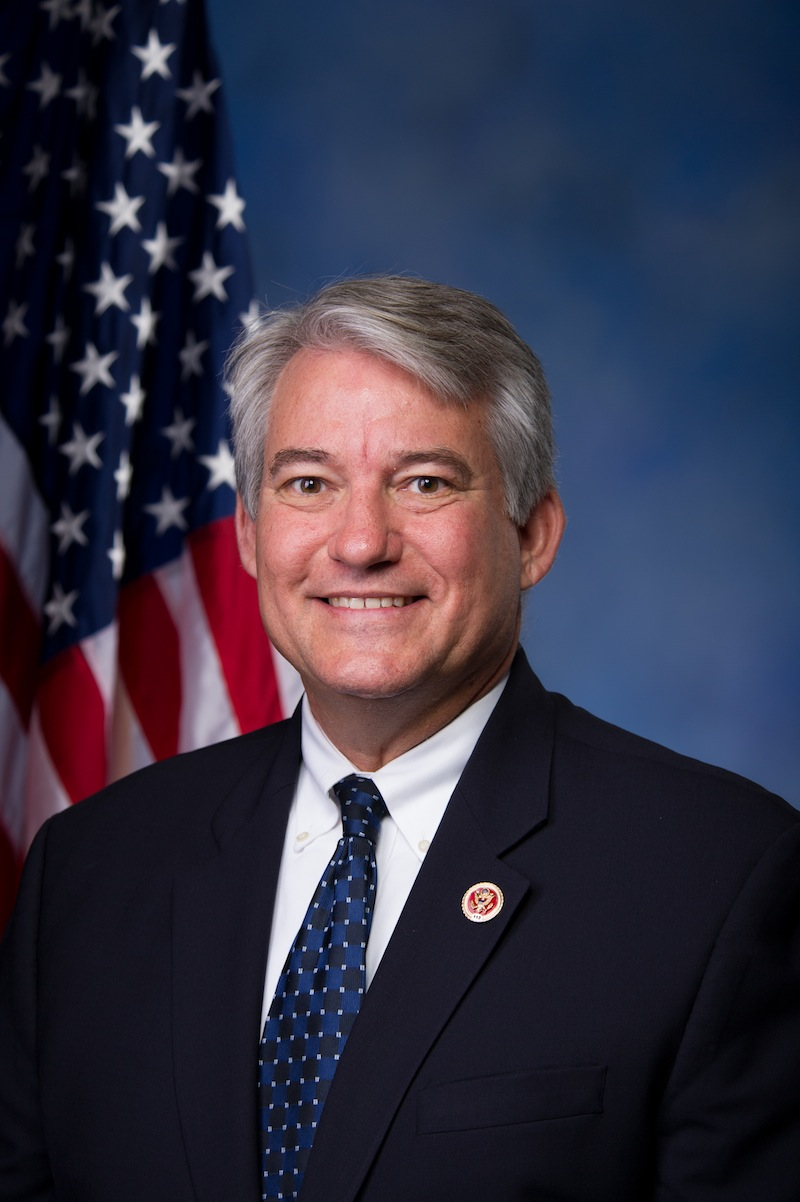

Member of the U.S. House of Representatives from Florida
- In office January 3, 2011 – January 3, 2019
- Preceded by: Adam Putnam
- Succeeded by: Ross Spano
- Constituency: 12th district (2011–2013); 15th district (2013–2019)

Member of the Florida House of Representatives
- In office November 7, 2000 – November 4, 2008
- Preceded by: Adam Putnam
- Succeeded by: Kelli Stargel
- Constituency: 63rd district (2000–2006); 64th district (2006–2008)

Personal details
- Born: Dennis Alan Ross; October 18, 1959 (age 67) Lakeland, Florida, U.S.
- Party: Republican
- Spouse: Cindy Hartley (m. 1983)
- Children: 2
- Education: University of Florida; Auburn University (BA); Samford University (JD)

Dennis Alan Ross (born October 18, 1959) is an American businessman and politician who served in the United States House of Representatives from 2011 to 2019. A Republican from Florida, his district was numbered as Florida's 12th congressional district during his first two years in Congress, and it was numbered as the 15th district during his last six years in Congress.

In April 2018, Ross announced that he would retire from Congress, and not run for re-election in 2018.

Starting in 2018, Ross became a distinguished professor of political science at Southeastern University and launched the American Center for Political Leadership (ACPL) in the Jannetides College of Business and Entrepreneurial Leadership.

== Early life, education, and business career ==
Ross was born October 18, 1959, in Lakeland, Florida, the youngest of five children born to Bill and Loyola Ross. He attended Catholic school for nine years before graduating at Lakeland Senior High School in 1977. After high school, he attended the University of Florida before transferring to Auburn University where he graduated in 1981 with a Bachelor of Science Degree in Organizational Management. He then graduated from Samford University's Cumberland School of Law in 1987.

Ross went to work in the newly developed micro-computer industry working for several companies. He went on to serve briefly as an Associate with the law firm of Holland & Knight and was in-house counsel to Walt Disney World. Subsequent to his time at Disney, he opened up his own law firm, Ross Vecchio P.A., representing Business and Industry in Workers Compensation matters for over 20 years. As Ross was elected to Congress, his former firm was required to change its name to Vecchio, Carrier, Feldman and Johannessen.

== Early political career ==
Ross went on to work for a year as a legislative aide in St. Petersburg to State Senator Dennis Jones in 1982. He was elected Chairman of the Polk County Republican Executive Committee, and served until 1995. In 1996, he ran unsuccessfully for the State Senate, losing to incumbent Democratic State Senator Rick Dantzler. In 2000, he ran for the 63rd district of the Florida House of Representatives, vacated by Adam Putnam.

== U.S. House of Representatives ==
=== Elections ===
2010

Ross decided to run for Florida's 12th congressional district, vacated for retiring Adam Putnam, who decided to run for Florida Commissioner of Agriculture. In the Republican primary, Ross defeated John W. Lindsey, Jr. 69%–31%. In the general election, he defeated Democrat Lori Edwards, the Polk County Supervisor of Elections, TEA Party candidate Randy Wilkinson, a Polk County Commissioner, 48%–41%–11%. This was the second time Ross succeeded Putnam. It was only the third time that a Democrat had managed to get 40 percent of the vote in this district since Andy Ireland switched parties in 1984 in what was then the 10th District (it was renumbered as the 12th after the 1990 census).

In 2009 Ross signed a pledge sponsored by Americans for Prosperity promising to vote against any Global Warming legislation that would raise taxes.

2012

After redistricting, Ross' district was renumbered as the 15th District. No other candidate filed by the deadline, and he won re-election to a second term unopposed.

=== Committee assignments ===
- Committee on Financial Services
  - Subcommittee on Capital Markets and Government-Sponsored Enterprises
  - Subcommittee on Oversight and Investigations

=== Caucus memberships ===
- Congressional Constitution Caucus
- Republican Study Committee
- Congressional Western Caucus
- United States Congressional International Conservation Caucus
- U.S.-Japan Caucus

== Political positions ==
Ross voted in favor of the Tax Cuts and Jobs Act of 2017 and supported President Donald Trump's 2017 executive order to impose a temporary ban on entry to the U.S. to citizens of seven Muslim-majority countries, calling the controversial order a "long overdue" measure to "ensure our country is safe from radical Islamic jihadists."

== After Congress ==
After leaving office, he became involved in political reform efforts, including joining nine other former members of Congress to co-author a 2021 opinion editorial advocating reforms of Congress. In March 2022, Ross announced that he would run for Florida's 15th congressional district in the 2022 election. However, he dropped out of the race in June 2022.

U.S. House of Representatives
Preceded by Adam Putnam	Member of the U.S. House of Representatives from Florida's 12th congressional district 2011–2013	Succeeded by Gus Bilirakis
Preceded by Bill Posey	Member of the U.S. House of Representatives from Florida's 15th congressional district 2013–2019	Succeeded by Ross Spano
U.S. order of precedence (ceremonial)
Preceded by Connie Mack IV as Former U.S. Representative	Order of precedence of the United States as Former U.S. Representative	Succeeded by Ted Yoho as Former U.S. Representative
