= William Timmons =

American politician (born 1984)

- Official portrait, 2025

Member of the U.S. House of Representatives from South Carolina's 4th district
- Incumbent
- Assumed office January 3, 2019
- Preceded by: Trey Gowdy

Member of the South Carolina Senate from the 6th district
- In office November 14, 2016 – November 9, 2018
- Preceded by: Mike Fair
- Succeeded by: Dwight Loftis

Personal details
- Born: William Richardson Timmons IV; April 30, 1984 (age 42) Greenville, South Carolina, U.S.
- Party: Republican
- Spouse: Sarah Anderson (m. 2019; div. 2023)
- Education: George Washington University (BA); University of South Carolina (MA, JD); New York University (MS)
- Website: House website Campaign website

Military service
- Branch/service: United States Air Force
- Years of service: 2018–present (Guard)
- Rank: Captain
- Unit: Air Force Judge Advocate General's Corps

William Richardson Timmons IV (born April 30, 1984) is an American politician, prosecutor, and Air Force officer serving as the U.S. representative for South Carolina's 4th congressional district since 2019. His district is in the heart of the Upstate and includes Greenville, Spartanburg, and most of their suburbs. Previously, Timmons served as a South Carolina state senator from 2016 to 2018. He is a member of the Republican Party.

Timmons is a member of the House Oversight Committee's 2025 Subcommittee on Delivering on Government Efficiency, to support the associated Department of Government Efficiency.

== Early life and education ==
Timmons was born on April 30, 1984, in Greenville, South Carolina, to Rick and Pat Timmons. In high school at Christ Church Episcopal School, Timmons was the 2001 South Carolina Player of the Year in tennis and won an individual state title in 2002.

A native of Greenville, Timmons attended George Washington University's Elliott School of International Affairs, where he earned a degree in international affairs and political science in 2006. While enrolled, Timmons played Division I tennis.

Timmons then studied at the University of South Carolina, earning a MA in international studies in 2009 and a JD in 2010. He also earned a MS degree in Cybersecurity Risk and Strategy from New York University in 2021.

== Early career ==
Timmons worked for the 13th Circuit solicitor's office from 2011 to 2015. In this role, he focused on serving victims of domestic violence and helped create a central court for all domestic violence cases in Greenville County. As Assistant Solicitor, Timmons prosecuted a variety of offenses during his legal career, including domestic abuse, white-collar crime, and murder.

In 2016, Timmons challenged longtime state senator Mike Fair in the Republican primary for a Greenville-area district. He finished first in the primary with 49.5% of the vote, fewer than 100 votes shy of winning the nomination outright. He then defeated Fair in the runoff with 65% of the vote and faced no major-party opposition in the general election.

== U.S. House of Representatives ==
=== Elections ===
==== 2018 ====
Timmons was elected to replace retiring Republican incumbent Trey Gowdy in South Carolina's 4th congressional district. His campaign slogan was "Washington is broken." On June 12, Timmons placed second in a 13-candidate primary–the real contest in this heavily Republican district–receiving 19.2% of the vote. On June 26, 2018, Timmons defeated former state senator Lee Bright in the runoff with 54.3% of the vote. He did not have to give up his state senate seat to run for Congress; South Carolina state senators serve four-year terms.

Timmons defeated Brandon Brown in the November general election with 59.5% of the vote. He became one of the youngest U.S. representatives from South Carolina since 1972.

==== 2020 ====
Timmons won renomination unopposed. He defeated Democratic nominee Kim Nelson in the general election with 61.6% of the vote.

==== 2022 ====
2022 GOP primary results by county: Timmons: 50–60%

Timmons won renomination with 52.7% of the vote in a four-candidate Republican primary.

Timmons won re-election unopposed. He was the only candidate on the general election ballot as his Democratic opponent dropped out in August.

==== 2024 ====
2024 GOP primary results by county: Timmons: 50–60%; Morgan: 50–60%

Timmons won renomination 51.6%–48.4% against Adam Morgan, a state representative challenger from the right. Morgans was endorsed by several conservative House Republicans as well as former South Carolina senator Jim DeMint. Timmons was endorsed by Donald Trump and House Republican leadership.

Timmons was re-elected in the general election.

==== 2026 ====
Timmons ran for re-election in 2026. In January 2026, he pledged to supporters that this would be his last re-election campaign before retiring in 2028. Timmons won renomination in the primary with 65.8% of the vote against two Republican challengers.

Timmons won in the general election with 51.7% of the vote against Democrat Courtney McClain and Libertarian candidate Jessica Ethridge.

=== Tenure ===
Timmons was sworn into office on January 3, 2019, amid a government shutdown. He cosponsored legislation to require Congress to balance the budget, defund Planned Parenthood, support Gold Star Families, strengthen national defense, and promote school choice.

Timmons serves on the Financial Services Committee, where he introduced legislation seeking to counter China's efforts to expand its 5G influence in countries receiving assistance from international financial institutions. He was elected by his classmates to represent the freshman class on the Republican Steering Committee.

He introduced legislation proposing an amendment to the Constitution of the United States to limit the number of consecutive terms that a member of Congress may serve (H.J.Res.86).

Timmons supported President Donald Trump during his first impeachment, saying of the process, "It is very, very, very broken" (referring to his 2018 campaign slogan "Washington is broken"). He added that he thought the process would be fair in the Senate and called the opposition to impeachment "bipartisan."

In December 2020, Timmons was one of 126 Republican members of the House of Representatives to sign an amicus brief in support of Texas v. Pennsylvania, a lawsuit filed at the United States Supreme Court contesting the results of the 2020 presidential election, in which Joe Biden defeated Trump. The Supreme Court declined to hear the case on the basis that Texas lacked standing under Article III of the Constitution to challenge the results of an election held by another state.

In January 2021, Timmons announced he would object to the certification of Biden as president. When Congress reconvened after the storming of the United States Capitol, Timmons voted to object to the Electoral College results.

In July 2024, Timmons questioned former Secret Service Director Kimberly Cheatle at a House Oversight Committee hearing. His comments gained national attention as Cheatle resigned the next day following fiery questioning from congressional leaders.

=== Committee assignments ===
- Committee on Financial Services
  - Subcommittee on Housing and Insurance
  - Subcommittee on Financial Institutions
  - Subcommittee on Digital Assets, Financial Technology, and Artificial Intelligence
- Committee on Oversight and Government Reform
  - Subcommittee on Military and Foreign Affairs (Chairman)
  - Subcommittee on Delivering on Government Efficiency

=== Caucus memberships ===
- Republican Study Committee

== Electoral history ==
South Carolina State Senate, District 6 Republican primary, 2016
Party	Candidate	Votes	%
Republican	William Timmons	4,880	49.51
Republican	Mike Fair	3,578	36.30
Republican	Johnny Edwards	1,399	14.19
Total votes		9,857	100.0

2016 South Carolina Senate District 6 Republican primary runoff
Party	Candidate	Votes	%
Republican	William Timmons	6,250	65.3%
Republican	Mike Fair	3,318	34.7%
Total votes		9,568	100.0%

South Carolina State Senate, District 6 general election, 2016
Party	Candidate	Votes	%
Republican	William Timmons	31,732	85.10
Constitution	Roy G. Magnuson	5,556	14.90
Total votes		37,288	100.0

South Carolina's 4th congressional district, Republican primary results, 2018
Party	Candidate	Votes	%
Republican	Lee Bright	16,742	24.95
Republican	William Timmons	12,885	19.21
Republican	Dan Hamilton	12,494	18.62
Republican	Josh Kimbrell	7,465	11.13
Republican	James Epley	5,386	8.03
Republican	Stephen Brown	5,078	7.57
Republican	Shannon Pierce	2,442	3.64
Republican	Mark Burns	1,662	2.48
Republican	Claude Schmid	1,414	2.11
Republican	Dan Albert	510	0.76
Republican	John Marshall Mosser	457	0.68
Republican	Justin David Sanders	354	0.53
Republican	Barry Bell	200	0.3
Total votes		67,089	100.0

South Carolina's 4th Congressional District, Republican primary runoff results, 2018
Party	Candidate	Votes	%
Republican	William Timmons	37,096	54.29
Republican	Lee Bright	31,236	45.71
Total votes		68,332	100.0

South Carolina's 4th congressional district, general election, 2018
Party	Candidate	Votes	%
Republican	William Timmons	145,321	59.57
Democratic	Brandon Brown	89,182	36.56
American	Guy Furay	9,203	3.77
N/A	Write-Ins	244	0.10
Margin of victory		56,139	23.01
Total votes		243,950	100.0
Republican hold			

South Carolina's 4th congressional district, general election, 2020
Party	Candidate	Votes	%
Republican	William Timmons	222,126	61.61
Democratic	Kim Nelson	133,023	36.89
Constitution	Michael Chandler	5,090	1.41
N/A	Write-Ins	311	0.09
Margin of victory		83,702	23.4
Total votes		360,550	100.0
Republican hold			

South Carolina's 4th congressional district, Republican primary results, 2022
Party	Candidate	Votes	%
Republican	William Timmons	24,800	52.69
Republican	Mark Burns	11,214	23.83
Republican	Michael Mike LaPierre	8,029	17.06
Republican	George Abuzeid	3,024	6.42
Total votes		47,067	100.0

South Carolina's 4th congressional district, general election, 2022
Party	Candidate	Votes	%
Republican	William Timmons	165,607	90.81
N/A	Write-Ins	16,758	9.19
Total votes		182,365	100.0

South Carolina's 4th congressional district, Republican primary results, 2024
Party	Candidate	Votes	%
Republican	William Timmons	36,533	51.6
Republican	Adam Morgan	34,269	48.4
Total votes		70,802	100.0

South Carolina's 4th congressional district, general election, 2024
Party	Candidate	Votes	%
Republican	William Timmons	206,916	59.73
Democratic	Kathryn Harvey	128,976	37.23
Constitution	Mark Hackett	9,779	2.82
N/A	Write-Ins	743	0.21
Total votes		346,414	100.0

2026 South Carolina's 4th congressional district Republican primary
Party	Candidate	Votes	%
Republican	William Timmons (incumbent)	47,895	65.8%
Republican	David Atchley	14,188	19.5%
Republican	Robert E Lee	10,663	14.7%
Total votes		72,746	100.0%

== Personal life ==
On July 17, 2019, Timmons married his wife, Sarah, on the balcony of the U.S. Capitol. Senator Tim Scott of South Carolina officiated.

In response to posts on social media, Timmons acknowledged in July 2022 that he and his wife were working on their marriage after "going through tough times" in recent months. He said other allegations were false and mostly defamatory and asked for "privacy and prayers." He told his constituents "don't be distracted" and emphasized that his personal life does not affect his congressional service.

Sarah filed for marital separation in mid-November 2022. In a statement provided to The Greenville News, the couple said they "will continue to remain close friends" and "respectfully ask for privacy". Divorce proceedings can begin a year after separation per South Carolina law. They were divorced by June 2024 and William said they are "still on very good terms".

Timmons is a captain in the Air National Guard. He has served since 2018 as a JAG officer assigned to the 263rd Army Air and Missile Defense Command.

He is a Protestant.

U.S. House of Representatives
Preceded by Trey Gowdy	Member of the U.S. House of Representatives from South Carolina's 4th congressional district 2019–present	Incumbent
U.S. order of precedence (ceremonial)
Preceded by Haley Stevens	United States representatives by seniority 230th	Succeeded by Rashida Tlaib
