= Bill Huizenga =

American politician (born 1969)

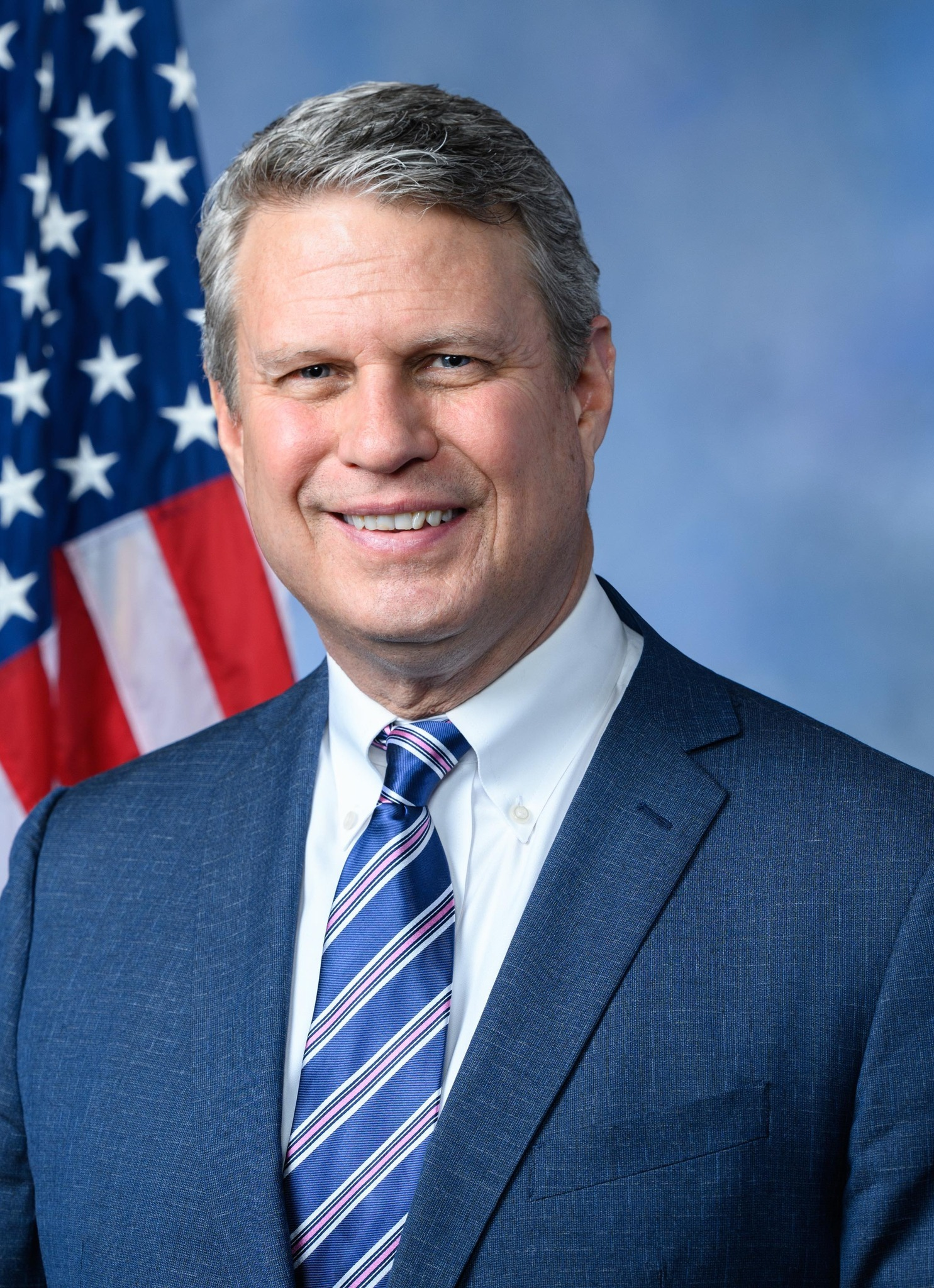
- Official portrait, 2023

Member of the U.S. House of Representatives from Michigan
- Incumbent
- Assumed office January 3, 2011
- Preceded by: Pete Hoekstra
- Constituency: 2nd district (2011–2023); 4th district (2023–present)

Member of the Michigan House of Representatives from the 90th district
- In office January 1, 2003 – January 1, 2009
- Preceded by: Wayne Kuipers
- Succeeded by: Joseph Haveman

Personal details
- Born: William Patrick Huizenga; January 31, 1969 (age 57)
- Party: Republican
- Children: 5
- Website: House website Campaign website
- Huizenga's voice Huizenga supporting investment and small business legislation. Recorded June 5, 2023

William Patrick Huizenga (/ˈhaɪzɪŋɡə/ HY-zing-gə; born January 31, 1969) is an American politician serving as a U.S. representative from Michigan since 2011, representing the state's 4th congressional district since 2023. A member of the Republican Party, Huizenga served in the Michigan House of Representatives from 2003 to 2009. His district covers much of Southwestern Michigan, including Kalamazoo, Battle Creek, and Holland. He previously represented the 2nd district from 2011 to 2023.

== Early life ==
Born to a family of Dutch Americans, Huizenga is the co-owner and operator of Huizenga Gravel Company, a family business in Jenison, Michigan. In the early 1990s, he worked in real estate. He left real estate in 1996, becoming an aide to U.S. representative Pete Hoekstra.

== Michigan House of Representatives ==
Starting with his first election in 2002, Huizenga represented the 90th district for three terms, winning reelection in 2004 and 2006. After the 2006 election he was term limited. The district is in Ottawa County and includes Holland, Zeeland, Hudsonville, Blendon Township, Jamestown Township, Holland Township, and Zeeland Township.

Huizenga voted for the initial version of the Michigan Business Tax, but opposed the 2% surcharge and a sales and services tax later in the process.

== U.S. House of Representatives ==
=== Elections ===
==== 2010 ====
After serving 18 years, Republican incumbent Pete Hoekstra retired to run for the Republican nomination for governor. Huizenga defeated Jay Riemersma, State Senator Wayne Kuipers, businessman Bill Cooper, and three others in the Republican primary election—the most heavily contested contest in this heavily Republican district—on August 3, 2010. Huizenga defeated Democratic nominee Fred Johnson, 64% to 32%. The district was rated "Solid Republican" by The New York Times. The district and its predecessors have been in Republican hands for all but four years since 1873, and without interruption since 1935.

==== 2012 ====
Huizenga was reelected, defeating Democratic nominee Willie German Jr., Mary Buzuma of the Libertarian Party, Ronald Graeser of the U.S. Taxpayers Party and William Opalicky of the Green Party.

==== 2014 ====
Huizenga was reelected, defeating Democratic nominee Dean Vanderstelt, Ronald Welch of the Libertarian Party and Ronald Graeser of the U.S. Taxpayers Party.

==== 2016 ====
Huizenga was reelected, defeating Democratic nominee Dennis Murphy, Erwin Haas of the Libertarian Party, and Matthew Brady of the Green Party.

==== 2018 ====
Huizenga was reelected, defeating Democratic nominee Rob Davison and Ronald Graeser of the U.S. Taxpayers Party.

==== 2020 ====
Huizenga was reelected, defeating Democratic nominee Bryan Berghoef, Max Riekse of the Libertarian Party, Gerald Van Sickle of the U.S. Taxpayers Party, and Jean-Michel Creviere of the Green Party.

==== 2022 ====
For his first six terms, Huizenga represented a district stretching from Ludington down Lake Michigan's eastern shore through Grand Rapids's suburbs, including Muskegon, Holland, Kentwood, and Grand Haven. However, redistricting after the 2020 census saw Michigan's congressional map significantly redrawn. The 2nd lost the more urban portions of Muskegon and Kent counties, along with all but a sliver of Ottawa County. This area accounted for around 30 percent of the old 2nd's land, but almost 60 percent of its constituents; indeed, it had dominated the politics of the 2nd and its predecessors for decades. To make up for the loss in population, it was pushed to the north and east, grabbing a large slice of territory previously in the old 4th district. That district's four-term incumbent, fellow Dutch-American Republican John Moolenaar, opted to run in the 2nd after the old 4th was dismantled and much of his former base was drawn into the 2nd.

Huizenga's home in Holland, along with most of southern Ottawa County and Holland's share of Allegan County, was merged with the Kalamazoo-based 6th district to form a new 4th district. Huizenga opted to run in the 4th. He was initially priming to challenge 18-term incumbent and fellow Republican Fred Upton, even though the new 4th was geographically more Upton's district than Huizenga's. However, Upton opted to retire, effectively handing the Republican nomination to Huizenga. In the general election, Huizenga easily won a seventh term, defeating Democratic nominee Joseph Alfonso, and Libertarian Party nominee, Lorence Welke.

==== 2024 ====
Huizenga was reelected, defeating Democratic nominee Jessica Swartz and Curtis Clark of the U.S. Taxpayers Party.

==== 2026 ====
Huizenga lost the seat to Democratic state senator Sean McCann in the November 2026 election. Ultimately. Huizenga could not overcome a 34,500-vote deficit in Kalamazoo County, the largest county in the district and home to McCann. This far exceeded the overall margin of 6,700 votes.

=== Tenure ===
In 2017, Huizenga voted to repeal the Affordable Care Act.

In December 2020, Huizenga was one of 126 Republican members of the House of Representatives to sign an amicus brief in support of Texas v. Pennsylvania, a lawsuit filed at the United States Supreme Court contesting the results of the 2020 presidential election, in which Joe Biden defeated incumbent Donald Trump. The Supreme Court declined to hear the case on the basis that Texas lacked standing under Article III of the Constitution to challenge the results of an election held by another state.

In 2026, Huizenga voted not to extend the Affordable Care Act enhanced tax credits.

In April 2026, Huizenga introduced the Deterring American AI Model Theft Act, H.R. 8283, which would require the government to list foreign entities that had carried out model extraction attacks on American AI models and consider them for export restrictions; the House Foreign Affairs Committee reported it by a vote of 43 to 0.

=== Committee assignments ===
- Committee on Financial Services
  - Subcommittee on Capital Markets
  - Subcommittee on Oversight and Investigations (chair)

=== Caucus memberships ===
- Republican Study Committee
- Congressional Constitution Caucus
- Republican Main Street Partnership
- Congressional Coalition on Adoption
- Congressional Blockchain Caucus
- House BIOTech Caucus

== Personal life ==
Huizenga and his wife have five children and live in Holland. He attends Haven Christian Reformed Church in Zeeland.

U.S. House of Representatives
Preceded by Pete Hoekstra	Member of the U.S. House of Representatives from Michigan's 2nd congressional district 2011–2023	Succeeded by John Moolenaar
Preceded by John Moolenaar	Member of the U.S. House of Representatives from Michigan's 4th congressional district 2023–present	Incumbent
U.S. order of precedence (ceremonial)
Preceded by Andy Harris	United States representatives by seniority 84th	Succeeded by Bill Keating
