= Michigan's 90th House of Representatives district =

American legislative district

Michigan's 90th State House of Representatives district
Representative
Bryan Posthumus; R–Rockford
- Demographics: 87.4% White; 1.2% Black; 5.7% Hispanic; 0.8% Asian; 0.1% Native American; 1.2% Other; 3.5% Multiracial
- Population (2024): 92,912

Michigan's 90th House of Representatives district (also referred to as Michigan's 90th House district) is a legislative district within the Michigan House of Representatives located in part of Kent County. The district was created in 1965, when the Michigan House of Representatives district naming scheme changed from a county-based system to a numerical one.

== List of representatives ==
Representative	Party	Dates	Residence	Notes
Martin Buth	Republican	1965–1982	Rockford	Lived in Comstock Park until around 1973.
Victor C. Krause	Republican	1983–1990	Rockford	
Jack Horton	Republican	1991–1992	Alpine Township	
Jessie F. Dalman	Republican	1993–1998	Holland	
Wayne Kuipers	Republican	1999–2002	Holland	
Bill Huizenga	Republican	2003–2008	Zeeland	
Joseph Haveman	Republican	2009–2014	Holland	
Daniela Garcia	Republican	2015–2018	Holland	
Bradley Slagh	Republican	2019–2022	Zeeland	
Bryan Posthumus	Republican	2023–present	Rockford	Lived in Cannon Township until around 2025.
Lynn Afendoulis	Republican	(Note: Member-elect.)	Grand Rapids Charter Township	

== Recent elections ==
=== 2020s ===
2026 Michigan House of Representatives election
Party	Candidate	Votes	%
Republican	Lynn Afendoulis	29,168	57.32
Democratic	Rachel Crowther	21,721	42.68
Total votes		50,889	100
Republican hold			

2024 Michigan House of Representatives election
Party	Candidate	Votes	%
Republican	Bryan Posthumus	36,841	63.5
Democratic	William Higgins	21,161	36.5
Total votes		58,002	100
Republican hold			

2022 Michigan House of Representatives election
Party	Candidate	Votes	%
Republican	Bryan Posthumus	29,448	62.1
Democratic	Meagan Hintz	17,992	37.9
Total votes		47,440	100
Republican hold			

2020 Michigan House of Representatives election
Party	Candidate	Votes	%
Republican	Bradley Slagh	32,446	64.2
Democratic	Christopher Banks	18,081	35.8
Total votes		50,527	100
Republican hold			

2018 Michigan House of Representatives election
Party	Candidate	Votes	%
Republican	Bradley Slagh	24,421	65.7
Democratic	Christopher Banks	12,754	34.3
Total votes		37,175	100
Republican hold			

2016 Michigan House of Representatives election
Party	Candidate	Votes	%
Republican	Daniela Garcia	30,968	72.9
Democratic	Mary M. Yedinak	11,533	27.1
Total votes		42,501	100
Republican hold			

2014 Michigan House of Representatives election
Party	Candidate	Votes	%
Republican	Daniela Garcia	19,930	78.3
Democratic	James Haspas	5,520	21.7
Total votes		25,450	100
Republican hold			

2012 Michigan House of Representatives election
Party	Candidate	Votes	%
Republican	Joseph Haveman	31,592	100
Total votes		31,592	100
Republican hold			

2010 Michigan House of Representatives election
Party	Candidate	Votes	%
Republican	Joe Haveman	24,643	100
Total votes		24,643	100
Republican hold			

2008 Michigan House of Representatives election
Party	Candidate	Votes	%
Republican	Joe Haveman	31,231	72.3
Democratic	Clay Stauffer	11,995	27.8
Total votes		43,226	100
Republican hold			

== Historical district boundaries ==
Map	Description	Apportionment Plan	Notes
	Kent County (part): Ada Township; Algoma Township; Alpine Township; Cascade Township; Cedar Springs; Courtland Township; Grand Rapids (part); Grandville; Nelson Township; Oakfield Township; Plainfield Township; Rockford; Solon Township; Sparta Township; Sparta Township; Tyrone Township; Walker	1964 Apportionment Plan	
	Kent County (part): Ada Township; Algoma Township; Bowne Township; Byron Township; Caledonia Township; Cedar Springs; Cascade Township; Courtland Township; Cannon Township; Grattan Township; Gaines Township; Kentwood (part); Lowell; Lowell Township; Nelson Township; Oakfield Township; Rockford; Solon Township; Spencer Township; Sparta Township; Tyrone Township; Vergennes Township	1972 Apportionment Plan	
	Kent County (part): Ada Township; Algoma Township; Alpine Township; Cannon Township; Cedar Springs; Courtland Township; Grattan Township; Lowell; Lowell Township; Nelson Township; Oakfield Township; Plainfield Township; Rockford; Solon Township; Sparta Township; Spencer Township; Tyrone Township; Vergennes Township	1982 Apportionment Plan	
	Ottawa County (part): Blendon Township; Holland; Holland Township; Hudsonville; Jamestown Township; Olive Township; Park Township; Port Sheldon Township; Robinson Township; Zeeland; Zeeland Township	1992 Apportionment Plan	
	Ottawa County (part): Blendon Township; Holland (part); Holland Township; Hudsonville; Jamestown Township; Zeeland; Zeeland Township	2001 Apportionment Plan	
	Ottawa County (part): Holland (part); Holland Township; Hudsonville; Jamestown Township; Zeeland; Zeeland Township	2011 Apportionment Plan	
