= Michigan's 73rd House of Representatives district =

American legislative district

Michigan's 73rd State House of Representatives district
Representative
Julie Brixie; D–Meridian Township
- Demographics: 77.9% White; 2.9% Black; 5.3% Hispanic; 7.9% Asian; 0.3% Native American; 0.1% Hawaiian/Pacific Islander; 0.6% Other; 5.2% Multiracial
- Population (2024): 92,283

Michigan's 73rd House of Representatives district (also referred to as Michigan's 73rd House district) is a legislative district within the Michigan House of Representatives located in part of Ingham County. The district was created in 1965, when the Michigan House of Representatives district naming scheme changed from a county-based system to a numerical one.

== List of representatives ==
Representative	Party	Dates	Residence	Notes
Harold B. Clark	Democratic	1965–1972	Warren	
Gilbert DiNello	Democratic	1973–1978	East Detroit	
Leo R. Lalonde	Democratic	1979–1982	East Detroit	
Nick Ciaramitaro	Democratic	1983–1992	Roseville	
Jack Horton	Republican	1993–1998	Lowell	Lived in Alpine Township from around 1993 to 1994. Lived in Vergennes Township from around 1995 to 1996.
Doug Hart	Republican	1999–2004	Rockford	
Tom Pearce	Republican	2005–2010	Rockford	
Peter MacGregor	Republican	2011–2014	Cannon Township	Lived in Rockford from around 2011 to 2012.
Chris Afendoulis	Republican	2015–2018	Grand Rapids Township	
Lynn Afendoulis	Republican	2019–2020	Grand Rapids	
Bryan Posthumus	Republican	2021–2022	Oakfield Township	
Julie Brixie	Democratic	2023–present	Meridian Township	Lived in Okemos until 2025.

== Recent elections ==
=== 2020s ===
2026 Michigan House of Representatives election
Party	Candidate	Votes	%
Democratic	Julie Brixie (incumbent)	24,554	60.75
Republican	Joshua Jon Rockey	15,863	39.25
Total votes		40,417	100
Democratic hold			

2018 Michigan House of Representatives election
Party	Candidate	Votes	%
Republican	Lynn Afendoulis	30,783	60.11
Democratic	Bill Saxton	20,430	39.89
Total votes		51,213	100
Republican hold			

2016 Michigan House of Representatives election
Party	Candidate	Votes	%
Republican	Chris Afendoulis	35,216	63.72%
Democratic	Deb Havens	17,885	32.36%
Libertarian	Ron Heeren	2,165	3.29%
Total votes		55,266	100.00%
Republican hold			

2014 Michigan House of Representatives election
Party	Candidate	Votes	%
Republican	Chris Afendoulis	24,255	67.72
Democratic	Mary Polonowski	11,561	32.28
Total votes		35,816	100.0
Republican hold			

2012 Michigan House of Representatives election
Party	Candidate	Votes	%
Republican	Peter MacGregor	32,466	63.46
Democratic	G. Scott Schuiling	16,489	32.23
Libertarian	Ron Heeren	1,537	3.0
Constitution	Ted Gerrard	666	1.30
Total votes		50,492	100.0
Republican hold			

2010 Michigan House of Representatives election
Party	Candidate	Votes	%
Republican	Peter MacGregor	28,526	73.92
Democratic	Jerrod Roberts	10,062	26.08
Total votes		38,588	100.0
Republican hold			

2008 Michigan House of Representatives election
Party	Candidate	Votes	%
Republican	Tom Pearce	31,754	58.93
Democratic	Bruce Hawley	20,615	38.26
Libertarian	Larry Orcutt	1,514	2.81
Total votes		53,883	100.0
Republican hold			

== Historical district boundaries ==
Map	Description	Apportionment Plan	Notes
	Macomb County (part): Centerline; East Detroit; Warren (part)	1964 Apportionment Plan	
	Macomb County (part): East Detroit; St. Clair Shores (part); Warren (part)	1972 Apportionment Plan	
	Macomb County (part): East Detroit (part); Roseville	1982 Apportionment Plan	
	Kent County (part): Ada Township; Algoma Township; Bowne Township; Cannon Township; East Grand Rapids; Grand Rapids Charter Township; Lowell; Lowell Township; Plainfield Township; Rockford; Vergennes Township	1992 Apportionment Plan	
	Kent County (part): Algoma Township; Cannon Township; Cedar Springs; Courtland Township; Nelson Township; Oakfield Township; Plainfield Township; Rockford; Solon Township; Sparta Township; Spencer Township; Tyrone Township	2001 Apportionment Plan	
	Kent County (part): Cannon Township; Courtland Township; East Grand Rapids; Grand Rapids Charter Township; Nelson Township; Oakfield Township; Plainfield Township; Spencer Township	2011 Apportionment Plan	
