= Greenville Public Schools (Michigan) =

School district in Michigan

Address
- 1414 Chase Street Greenville, Montcalm, Michigan, 48838; United States

District information
- Grades: Pre-Kindergarten-12
- Superintendent: Wayne Roedel
- Schools: 7
- Budget: $60,600,000 2022-2023 expenditures
- NCES District ID: 2617160

Students and staff
- Students: 3,391 (2024-2025)
- Teachers: 194.41 (on an FTE basis) (2024-2025)
- Staff: 450.02 FTE (2024-2025)
- Student–teacher ratio: 17.44 (2024-2025)

Other information
- Website: www.gpsjackets.org

Greenville Public Schools is a public school district in Montcalm County, Michigan. It serves Greenville and parts of Eureka Township, Fairplain Township, Montcalm Township, and Sidney Township. It also serves parts of Oakfield Township and Spencer Township in Kent County and a small part of Otisco Township in Ionia County.

== History ==
According to the 1916 Greenville High School yearbook, "In 1845 the inhabitants of Greenville decided that the future prosperity of this town depended upon the education of their children." The first school was therefore established.

In 1869, a three-story white brick school was built at the south end of Franklin Street, between Union Street and Judd Street, to house the high school. The building burned on April 23, 1911.

The high school was rebuilt in 1912, but an undamaged addition known as The Annex (built in 1908) remained. A section was added to the 1912 building in 1936. In 1942, the interior of the auditorium burned and was rebuilt by that fall.

The present Greenville High School has been in use since the fall of 1961. The former high school building was torn down in the 1970s and the town's public library was built on the site.

== Schools ==
Schools in Greenville Public Schools district
School	Address	Notes
Baldwin Heights Elementary	821 W Oak Street, Greenville	Grades PreK-5
Cedar Crest Elementary	601 Maple Street, Greenville	Grades PreK-5
Lincoln Heights Elementary	12420 Lincoln Lake Rd NE, Greenville	Grades PreK-5
Walnut Hills Elementary	712 N. Walnut Street, Greenville	Grades PreK-5
Greenville Middle School	1321 Chase Street, Greenville	Grades 6-8
Greenville High School	111 N. Hillcrest Street, Greenville	Grades 9-12. Built 1961.
Satterlee School	8153 Satterlee Road, Greenville	
