= Afendoulis =

Afendoulis (Greek: Αφενδούλης) is a Greek surname. Notable people with the surname include:

- Chris Afendoulis (born 1962), American politician
- Lynn Afendoulis (born 1958), American politician
