= Class Action =

A class action is a form of lawsuit.

Class Action may also refer to:

- Class Action (film), 1991, starring Gene Hackman and Mary Elizabeth Mastrantonio
- Class Action (band), a garage house band
- "Class Action" (Teenage Robot), a 2002 episode of My Life as a Teenage Robot
- Class Action, a play by Brad Slaight
- Class Action, a 2002 book that was the basis for the film North Country
- Cla$$ Action, a 2005 novel by Henry Denker
