= Wells Municipal Airport =

Wells Municipal Airport may refer to:

- Wells Municipal Airport (Minnesota) in Wells, Minnesota, United States (FAA: 68Y)
- Wells Municipal Airport (Nevada) in Wells, Nevada, United States (FAA/IATA: LWL)

== See also ==
- Wells Airport in Rockford, Michigan, United States (FAA: 35C)
