= Slaight =

Slaight is an English surname. Notable people with the surname include:

- Allan Slaight (1931–2021), Canadian rock and roll radio pioneer, media mogul, and philanthropist
- Annabel Slaight, Canadian author
- Brad Slaight (born 1964), American actor
- Gary Slaight (born 1951), Canadian broadcasting executive and philanthropist

== See also ==
- Slaight Communications, Canadian radio broadcasting company
- Slaight Family Music Lab
