= Murder of Mary Welch =

Murder perpetrated by Seth Welch and Tatiana Fusari

- Location: Solon Township, Kent County, Michigan, U.S.
- Date: August 2, 2018
- Attack type: Child neglect, starvation, dehydration
- Victims: Mary Welch, 10 months old
- Perpetrators: Seth Welch; Tatiana Fusari
- Motive: Child abuse, religion
- Verdict: Both found guilty
- Convictions: Murder, child neglect

The murder of Mary Anne Welch (October 23, 2017 – August 2, 2018) was perpetrated by her parents Seth Welch and Tatiana Fusari. Mary, a 10-month old infant, died of malnutrition and dehydration in Solon Township, Kent County, Michigan on August 2, 2018. Both parents were convicted of first-degree murder after Mary's death was attributed to neglect.

== Background ==
Child Protective Services had been in contact with the family dating back to 2014 after THC was found in the system of their eldest newborn child.

Mary Welch weighed only 8 pounds (3.6 kg) at the time of her death, only 1.25 pounds (0.57 kg) more than at the time of her birth ten months earlier. In People v. Welch, it was stated that, "the autopsy of the child showed visible injuries to the child's lungs, heart, abdominal organs, as well as a shrunken thymus gland and bone marrow incapable of producing white or red blood cells. An expert testified that this confirmed that the child died from malnourishment and dehydration.” While the parents were aware their daughter was underweight, they refused to seek medical assistance. The couple cited religious reasons and a lack of trust in the medical system. At the time of Mary's death, two of the couple's three children had never been to a licensed doctor.

The county sheriff testified that the family home was unhygienic during the initial investigation. He cited evidence of vermin, insects, and mold. The doctor who performed the autopsy stated that the infant was suffering from chronic malnutrition, which he believed was caused by the withholding of food and water. Following the death of Mary, CPS sought to terminate the parental rights of the couple.

== Aftermath ==
Reaction of Welch and Fusari upon hearing their charges

The couple was initially charged with homicide felony murder in August 2018. The video of their reaction to the charge subsequently went viral. In June 2020, Seth Welch was convicted of first-degree murder and sentenced to life in prison without the possibility of parole. In 2021, Fusari testified that her husband was abusive, and would rape and beat her. She stated that she was not permitted to take her daughter to a doctor, and blamed the abuse for not being able to provide care for Mary. However, Fusari claimed she did not notice that Mary was unhealthy, and did not know what caused her death.

In November 2021, Fusari was also sentenced to life without the possibility of parole for first-degree murder. She was additionally sentenced 15 to 30 years on the charge of first-degree child abuse.

== See also ==
- Murder of Emani Moss
