= Ty Hallock =

American football player (born 1971)

No. 49, 94
- Positions: Fullback, tight end, linebacker

Personal information
- Born: April 30, 1971 (age 55); Grand Rapids, Michigan, U.S.
- Listed height: 6 ft 2 in (1.88 m)
- Listed weight: 252 lb (114 kg)

Career information
- High school: Greenville (Greenville, Michigan)
- College: Michigan State
- NFL draft: 1993: 7th round, 174th overall pick

Career history
- Detroit Lions (1993–1994); Jacksonville Jaguars (1996–1997); Chicago Bears (1998–2000)

Awards and highlights
- All-Big Ten (1992)

Career NFL statistics
- Rushing yards: 62
- Rushing average: 3.6
- Receptions: 65
- Receiving yards: 487
- Total touchdowns: 4
- Stats at Pro Football Reference

Ty Hallock (born April 30, 1971) is an American former professional football player who was a fullback, tight end and linebacker for the Detroit Lions, Jacksonville Jaguars and Chicago Bears. He played college football for the Michigan State Spartans.

== Early life and playing career ==
Hallock was born in Grand Rapids, Michigan and raised in Greenville, Michigan attending Greenville High School (Michigan). Hallock played college football for Michigan State Spartans from 1989 to 1993 where he was named to the 1992 All Big Ten Conference team after 144 tackles. He was selected by the Detroit Lions in the 1993 NFL draft in the seventh round with the 174th overall pick. He played eight years in the NFL, playing fullback, tight end and linebacker for the Detroit Lions, Jacksonville Jaguars and Chicago Bears.

== Post-playing career ==
Since his retirement in 2001, Ty Hallock has dabbled in media as high school football announcer and as a post game analyst for Detroit Lions games on WOOD-TV. He also coached his sons, Tanner and Tate at Forest Hills Central High School before they went on to play at Michigan State. Ty is the Vice President of Real Estate with First Companies Inc.
