= Mike Vining =

American soldier (born 1950)

Mike R. Vining
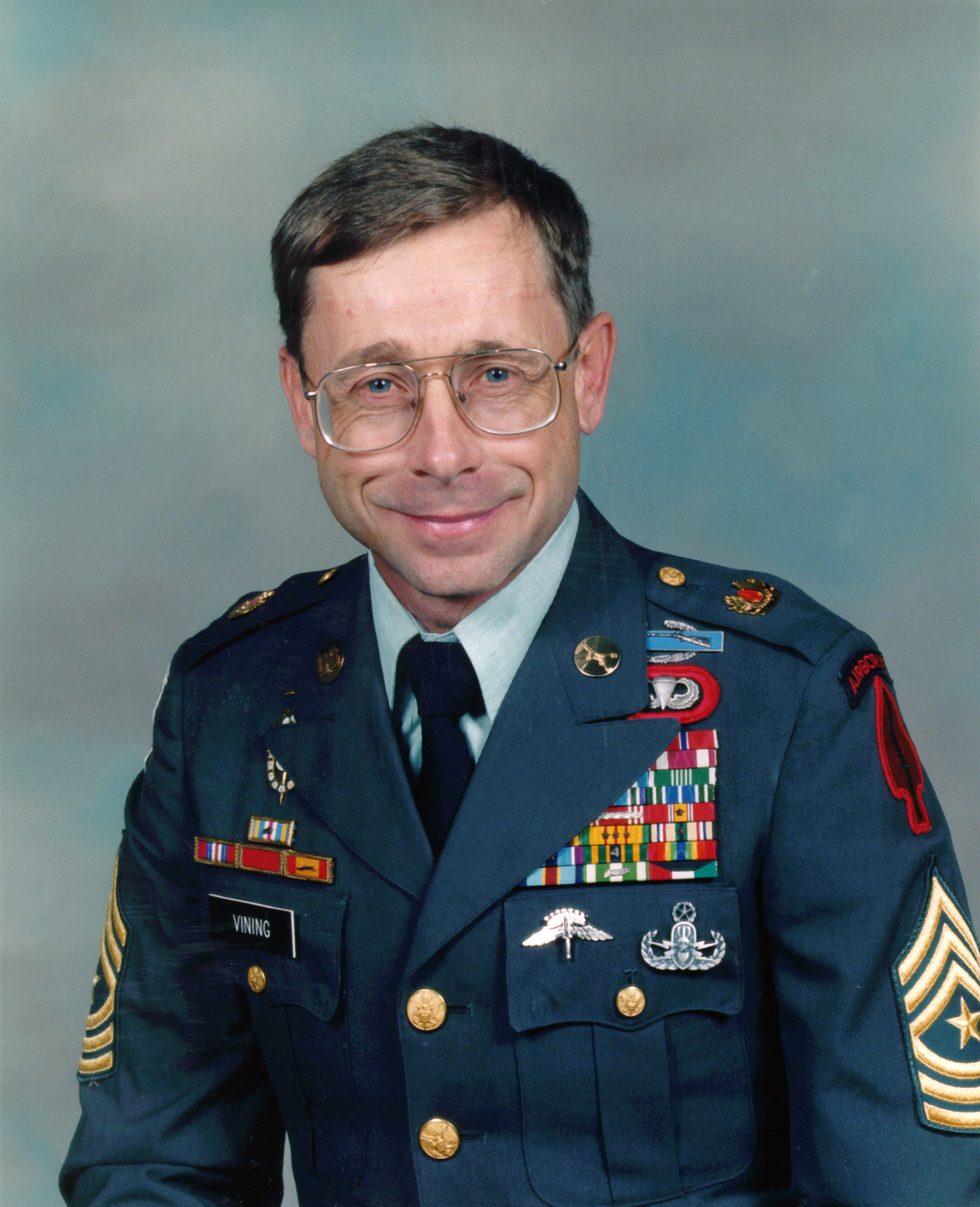
- Vining in Army Service Uniform in 1999
- Born: August 12, 1950 (age 76); Greenville, Michigan, U.S.
- Alma mater: Excelsior University
- Spouse: Donna Ikenberry (m. 1999)
- Children: 2
- Military career
- Branch: United States Army
- Service years: 1968–1971; 1973–1999
- Rank: Sergeant major
- Units: 99th Ordnance Detachment (EOD); 1st Special Forces Operational Detachment-Delta
- Conflicts: Vietnam War; Operation Eagle Claw; Operation Urgent Fury; Operation Just Cause; Gulf War; Operation Uphold Democracy
- Awards: Legion of Merit; Bronze Star

Mike Roger Vining (born August 12, 1950) is a retired sergeant major in the United States Army, an explosive ordnance disposal (EOD) specialist, and one of the original founding members of 1st Special Forces Operational Detachment-Delta (Delta Force). He joined the U.S. Army in 1968 and served until 1999.

== Early life ==
Mike Vining was born on August 12, 1950 in Greenville, Michigan, to Roger Earl (1927–2020) and Dolores Arlene Vining (née Croff, originally Rector; 1930–2003). Raised in Howard City, Michigan, Vining had an interest in science, mountain climbing, and serving in the military since childhood. He developed a hobby of crafting small-scale explosives, such as a Wilson cloud chamber, after ordering a manual on the subject via an ad in Popular Science. Inspired by a World War II film about a British soldier disarming a German bomb in London, as well as high school news of the Tet Offensive, he was motivated to join the military to become an EOD technician. He graduated from Tri-County High School in 1968 and immediately enlisted in the United States Army.

== Military career ==
Vining completed the Army's explosive ordnance disposal (EOD) program at Fort McClellan and Indian Head, Maryland in 1969 before being sent to Vietnam in 1970. He served in the 99th Ordnance Detachment for a year before being honorably discharged. While in Vietnam, he was awarded the Bronze Star for "meritorious service in ground operations and EOD duties". After completing his tour in Vietnam, Vining briefly left the Army and returned home to Michigan. He worked at a plant that stamped out automotive body parts for Ford Motor Company, eventually becoming the lead employee operating a 500-ton press.

In 1973, he rejoined the Army, serving as an EOD specialist in the 63rd Ordnance Detachment at Fort Leonard Wood. In 1978, he volunteered to join the newly formed 1st Special Forces Operational Detachment-Delta (Delta Force) as a plank owner and the unit's very first EOD specialist.

Vining served in Delta until 1985, participating in high-profile missions including Operation Eagle Claw and Operation Urgent Fury. From 1985 to 1986, he was assigned to the 176th Ordnance Detachment in Alaska, before returning to Delta Force from 1986 to 1992. During his second stint with Delta, he took part in Operation Just Cause, the Gulf War, and Operation Uphold Democracy, and served as a demolitions expert following the 1996 Khobar Towers bombing. He retired from the Army in January 1999 after 31 years of service.

== Later career ==
Vining holds a Bachelor of Science in sociology from Excelsior University, and has worked as a historian for the National EOD Association and the EOD Warrior Foundation. He has also written several articles on naval and polar postal history, for which he received the Joseph M. Hale Award for excellence in research and the Stanton Honeyman award. In 1991, Vining became a member of the Universal Ship Cancellation Society, later serving as its director from 2007 to 2009.

In 2018, he was inducted into the United States Army Ordnance Corps Hall of Fame.

== Internet meme ==
In the 2010s, an official 1999 Army portrait of Vining in his Army Service Uniform became a viral internet meme.

First appearing on platforms like 4chan in 2013, the meme usually features the photo with the text "You don't operate, do you son?" superimposed over it. The image juxtaposes Vining's unassuming, schoolteacher-like demeanor and glasses with the staggering array of valor medals, ribbons, and qualifications on his uniform, which verify his extensive combat experience. Widely circulated during the Global War on Terrorism, it has frequently been used as a reaction image.

Commenting on the trend, Vining stated, "I do not know how any of the memes got started. One of my grandchildren saw that someone even did a Pokémon card on me."

== Awards and decorations ==
Vining earned the following throughout his military career:

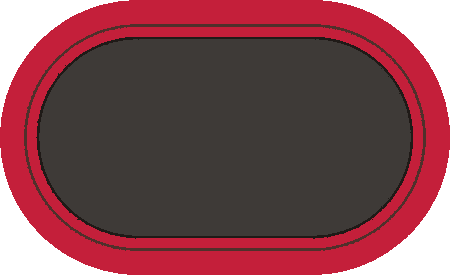

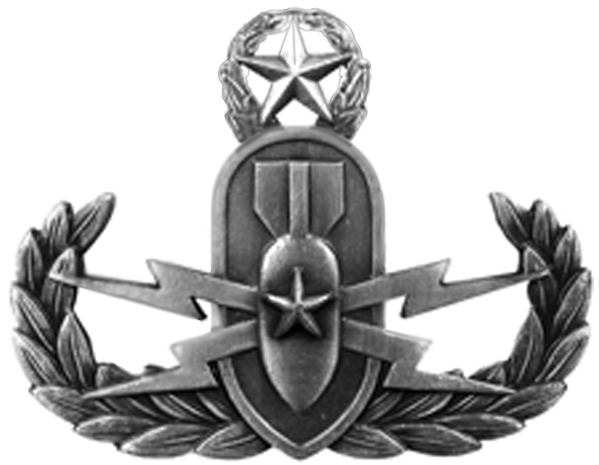

Badge	Combat Infantryman Badge			
Badge	Basic Parachutist Badge with United States Army Special Operations Command background trimming			
1st row	Legion of Merit		Bronze Star Medal	Defense Meritorious Service Medal with 1 bronze Oak leaf cluster
2nd row	Meritorious Service Medal	Joint Service Commendation Medal	Army Commendation Medal	Joint Service Achievement Medal with 1 bronze Oak leaf cluster
3rd row	Army Achievement Medal	Army Good Conduct Medal with 4 silver Good conduct loops	National Defense Service Medal with 1 Service Star	Armed Forces Expeditionary Medal with 1 Campaign star
4th row	Vietnam Service Medal with 3 bronze Campaign stars	Southwest Asia Service Medal with 1 Campaign star	Humanitarian Service Medal with 1 Service Star	NCO Professional Development Ribbon with award numeral 4
5th row	Army Service Ribbon	Army Overseas Service Ribbon	Vietnam Campaign Medal with "60-" clasp	Kuwait Liberation Medal (Kuwait)
Badges	Military Freefall Parachutist Badge		Master Explosive Ordnance Disposal Badge	

== Personal life ==
In January 1999, he married Donna Ikenberry on Mauna Kea, in Hawaii. Vining lives with his wife, a freelance photojournalist, in South Fork, Colorado. They have two children, Terri and Lorri.
