= Joseph Haveman =

American politician

The Honorable Joseph Haveman
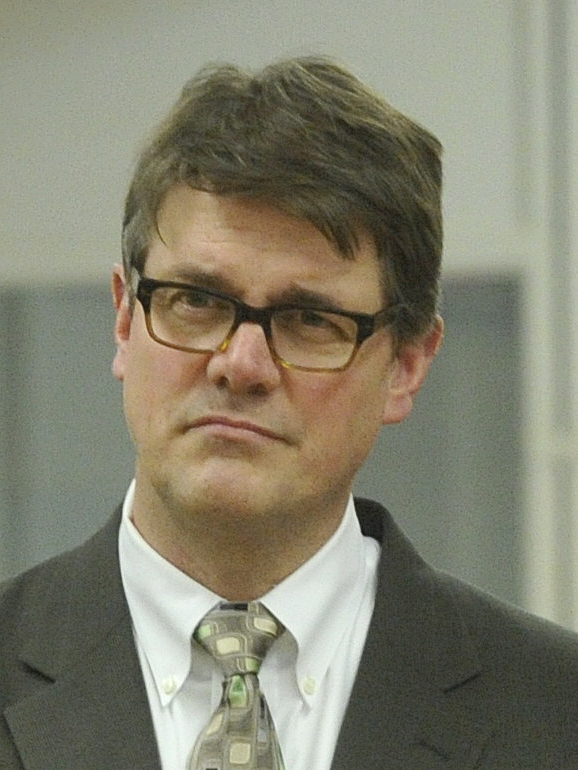
- Haveman in 2014

Member of the Michigan House of Representatives from the 90th district
- In office January 1, 2009 – December 31, 2014
- Preceded by: Bill Huizenga
- Succeeded by: Daniela Garcia

Personal details
- Born: February 21, 1961 (age 65) Holland, Michigan
- Party: Republican
- Spouse: Kim
- Education: Ferris State University (B.S.)
- Committees: Chairman, Appropriations (97th Legislature)
- Website: State Rep. Joseph Haveman

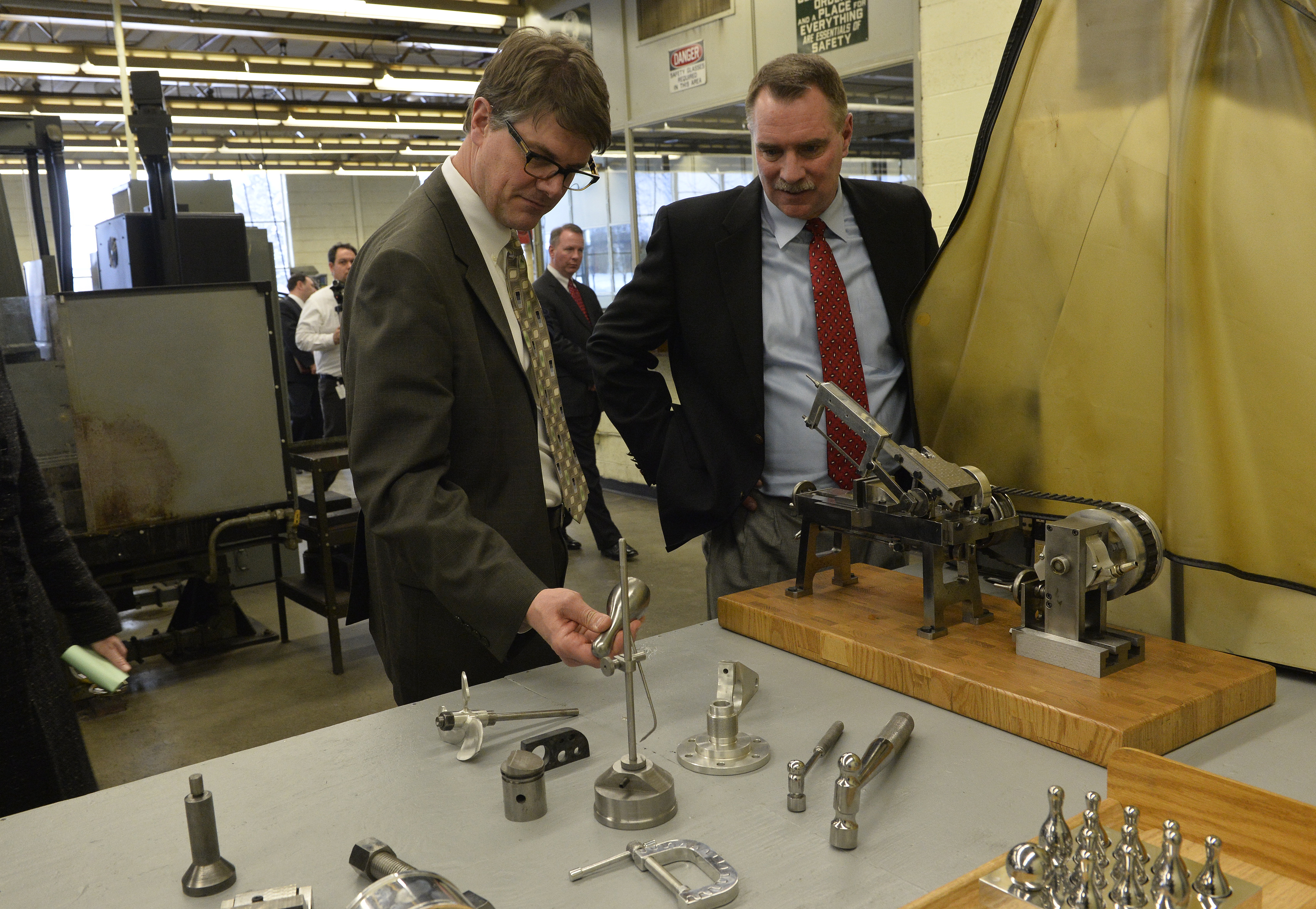
State Representative Haveman and Andy Ribbens, President of Premier Finishing in Grand Rapids, look over some of the products created by prisoners in the machines shop at the Richard A. Handlon Correctional Facility.

Joseph "Joe" Haveman (born February 21, 1961) is a Republican politician from Michigan who previously served in the Michigan House of Representatives. For the 97th Legislature, Haveman was the Chairman of the Committee on Appropriations. In March 2017, Haveman filed to run for State Senator of the 30th district.

Prior to his election to the legislature, Haveman was director of business development at GDK Construction, executive director of the Holland Home Builders Association, and a former member of both Holland City Council and the Ottawa County Board of Commissioners.

Haveman is also active in the Republican Party as a member of the Ottawa County Republican Party's Executive Committee.
