= Justin Zimmer =

American football player (born 1992)

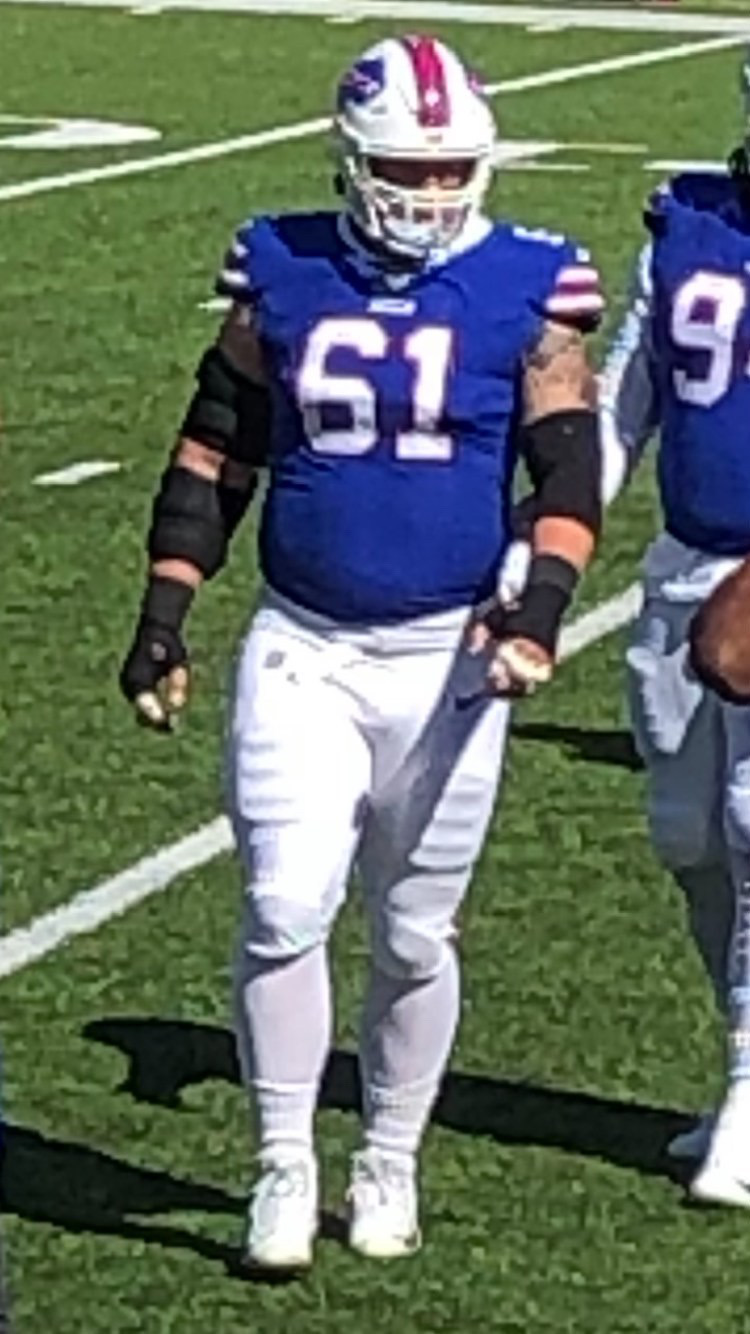
- Zimmer with the Buffalo Bills in 2021

No. 95, 92, 99, 61, 96
- Position: Defensive tackle

Personal information
- Born: October 23, 1992 (age 34); Grand Rapids, Michigan, U.S.
- Listed height: 6 ft 3 in (1.91 m)
- Listed weight: 305 lb (138 kg)

Career information
- High school: Greenville (Greenville, Michigan)
- College: Ferris State
- NFL draft: 2016: undrafted

Career history
- Buffalo Bills (2016)*; New Orleans Saints (2016–2017)*; Montreal Alouettes (2017); Atlanta Falcons (2018–2019); Cleveland Browns (2019); Buffalo Bills (2020–2022); Miami Dolphins (2022)
- * Offseason or practice squad member only

Awards and highlights
- 2× Division II All-American (2014, 2015); 3× First-team All-GLIAC (2013-2015); Ferris State Athletics Hall of Fame (2025); Greenville (MI) Athletics Hall of Fame (2025)

Career NFL statistics
- Total tackles: 35
- Sacks: 2.0
- Forced fumbles: 1
- Stats at Pro Football Reference
- Stats at CFL.ca

Justin Zimmer (born October 23, 1992) is an American former professional football player who was a defensive tackle in the National Football League (NFL) for seven seasons. He played college football for the Ferris State Bulldogs. He was a member of the Buffalo Bills, New Orleans Saints, Atlanta Falcons, Cleveland Browns, and Miami Dolphins of the NFL, in addition to the Montreal Alouettes of the Canadian Football League (CFL).

== College career ==
Zimmer played four seasons for the Ferris State Bulldogs, compiling a total of 216 tackles, 26 sacks, 48.5 tackles for a loss, 1 interception, 1 touchdown, 14 pass deflections, 9 forced fumbles, 1 fumble recovery, and 3 blocked kicks. He was a three time first-team All-Great Lakes Intercollegiate Athletic Conference selection, a two time Division II All-American, and a three time Division II Academic All-American.

== Professional career ==
=== Buffalo Bills (first stint) ===
Zimmer signed with the Buffalo Bills as an undrafted free agent on May 6, 2016. He was waived by the Bills on August 30, 2016.

=== New Orleans Saints ===
On December 13, 2016, Zimmer was signed to the practice squad of the New Orleans Saints. He signed a reserve/future contract with the Saints on January 2, 2017. He was waived on September 2, 2017.

=== Montreal Alouettes ===
Zimmer signed with the Montreal Alouettes of the Canadian Football League on September 21, 2017, and was added to the team's practice roster. He was promoted to the active roster and appeared in the Alouettes' final game of the season, recording three tackles and one sack.

=== Atlanta Falcons ===
On April 17, 2018, Zimmer was signed by the Atlanta Falcons. Zimmer made the Falcons' 53-man roster, and made his regular season debut in Week 3. He was waived by the Falcons on October 2, 2018, and was re-signed to the practice squad. On December 4, 2018, Zimmer was signed to the Falcons’ 53-man roster.

On August 31, 2019, Zimmer was waived by the Falcons and was signed to the practice squad the next day.

=== Cleveland Browns ===
On December 3, 2019, Zimmer was signed by the Cleveland Browns off the Falcons' practice squad. The Browns waived Zimmer with a non-football injury designation on July 31, 2020.

=== Buffalo Bills (second stint) ===
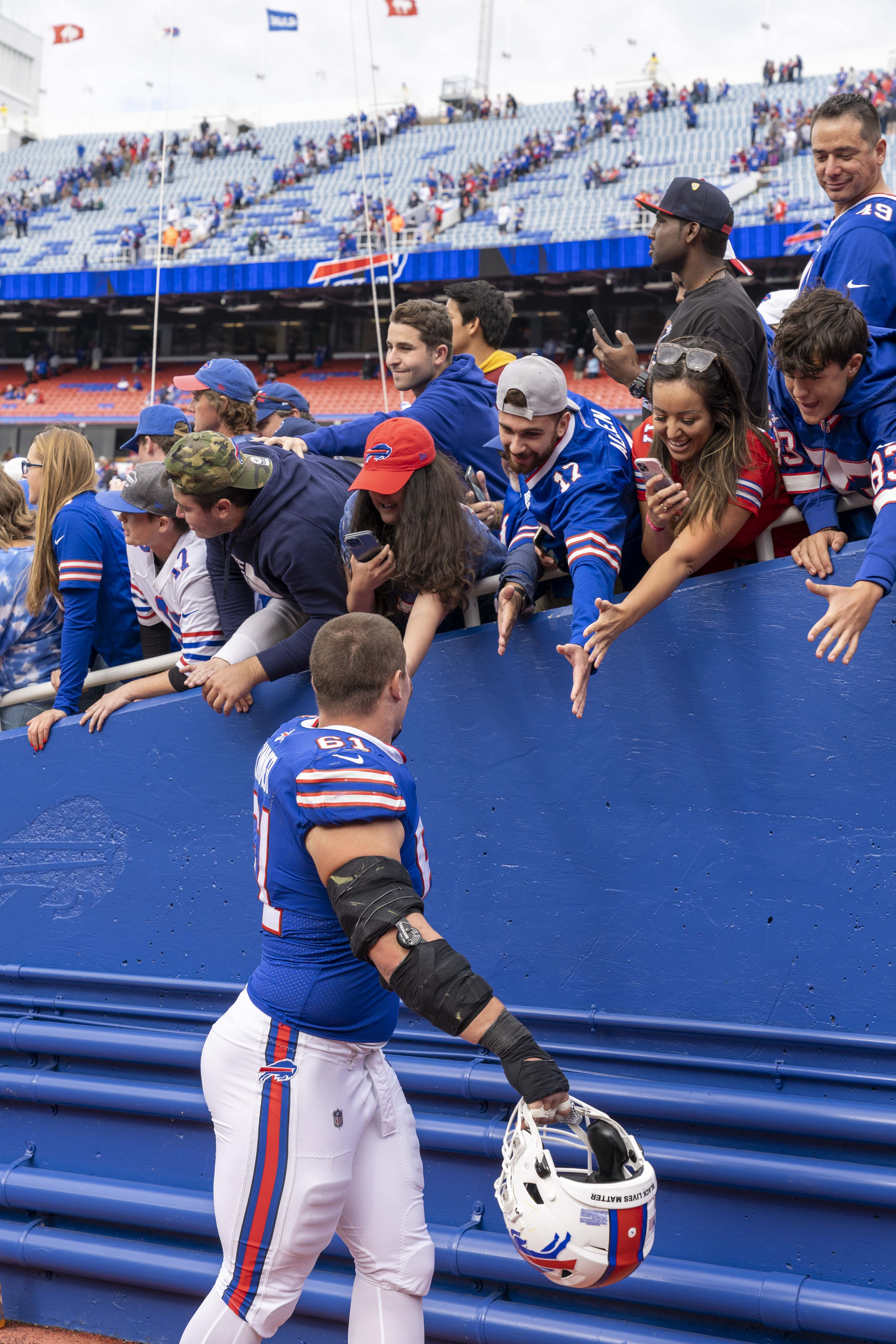
Zimmer greets Bills fans in 2021

On August 16, 2020, Zimmer signed with the Buffalo Bills. He was waived on September 5, 2020, and signed to the practice squad the next day. He was elevated to the active roster on September 12 and October 19 for the team's weeks 1 and 6 games against the New York Jets and Kansas City Chiefs, and reverted to the practice squad the day after each game. He was signed to active roster on October 21.

In Week 8 against the New England Patriots, Zimmer made a key play late in the fourth quarter, punching the ball out of Patriots quarterback Cam Newton's hands on a quarterback keeper as New England was driving down the field to either tie or win the game. The forced fumble and recovery by teammate Dean Marlowe sealed a 24–21 Bills win. Zimmer was awarded a game ball following the contest. In Week 10 against the Arizona Cardinals, Zimmer recorded his first career sack on Kyler Murray during the 32–30 loss. During the Bills' Divisional Round matchup against the Baltimore Ravens, Zimmer recorded a top speed of 18.45 miles per hour on an interception return, which was the second fastest speed by a Defensive Tackle during the 2020-21 season.

During the 2021 season, Zimmer was placed on injured reserve with a season-ending knee injury on November 11. He became a free agent after the season, but was re-signed to the Bills' practice squad on October 4, 2022.

=== Miami Dolphins ===
On November 23, 2022, Zimmer was signed by the Miami Dolphins off the Bills' practice squad. On December 31, Zimmer was placed on season–ending injured reserve with an undisclosed injury.
