= Alex Kemp (American football official) =

American football official

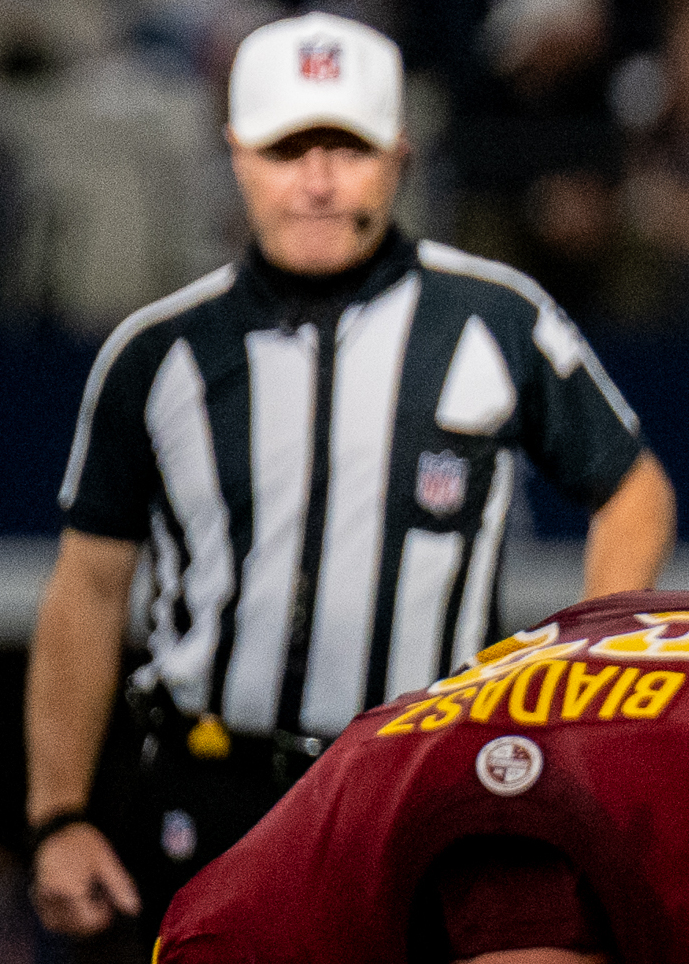
- Kemp in 2025
- Occupation: NFL official (2014–present)

Alex Kemp is an American professional football official in the National Football League (NFL). He wears uniform number 55. He entered the league in the 2014 season as a side judge and was promoted to referee for the 2018 season following the retirements of Ed Hochuli and Jeff Triplette. He went to Greenville High School in Greenville, Michigan. On January 2, 2022, Kemp was the referee during Antonio Brown’s departure from MetLife Stadium in New Jersey, and eventually his football career during a game between the Tampa Bay Buccaneers and New York Jets. In September 2023, Kemp went viral for his response to Seahawks quarterback Geno Smith interrupting him over an intentional grounding call, with Kemp replying, "I'm talking to America here."

== 2024 crew ==
- R: Alex Kemp
- U: Mike Morton
- DJ: Robert Richeson
- LJ: Rusty Baynes
- FJ: Sean Petty
- SJ: Lo van Pham
- BJ: Scott Helverson
- RO: Gerald Frye
- RA: Julie Johnson
