= Greenville High School (Michigan) =

Location
- 111 North Hillcrest Street; Greenville, Michigan 48838; United States; 43°10′56″N 85°16′16″W

Information
- Type: Public High School
- School district: Greenville Public Schools
- Superintendent: Linda Van Houten
- Principal: Michelle Blaszczynski
- Teaching staff: 54.00 (on a FTE basis)
- Grades: 9-12
- Enrollment: 1,086 (2023-2024)
- Student to teacher ratio: 20.11
- Colors: Purple & Gold
- Athletics conference: Ottawa-Kent Conference
- Nickname: Yellow Jackets
- Rival: Belding Black Knights
- Yearbook: Hi Life
- Website: www.gpsjackets.org/o/ghs

Greenville High School (GHS) is a 9-12 public high school located in Greenville, Michigan. GHS is part of the Greenville Public Schools district.

== Demographics ==
The demographic breakdown of the 1,144 students enrolled in 2014-15 was:

- Male - 52.9%
- Female - 47.1%
- Native American/Alaskan - 0%
- Asian/Pacific islanders - 0.8%
- Black - 1.4%
- Hispanic - 4.6%
- White - 92.2%
- Multiracial - 1.0%

41.2% of the students were eligible for free or reduced lunch.

== Athletics ==
The Greenville Yellow Jackets compete in the Ottawa-Kent Conference. The school colors are purple and gold. The following MHSAA sanctioned sports are offered:

- Baseball (boys)
- Basketball (boys & girls)
- Cross country (boys & girls)
- Football (boys)
- Golf (boys & girls)
- Soccer (boys & girls)
- Softball (girls)
- Tennis (boys & girls)
- Track and field (boys & girls)
- Volleyball (girls)
- Wrestling (boys)
  - State champion - 2008

== Notable alumni ==
- Ty Hallock - NFL fullback
- Shane Mahan - Motion picture special effects artist
- Damian Matacz - Professional basketball player
- Justin Zimmer - NFL defensive tackle
- Alex Kemp - NFL referee
