= Bradley Slagh =

American politician

Member of the Michigan House of Representatives
- Incumbent
- Assumed office January 1, 2019
- Preceded by: Daniela Garcia
- Constituency: 90th district (2019–2022); 85th district (2023–present)

Personal details
- Party: Republican
- Spouse: Carol
- Children: 3
- Education: Hope College
- Website: Slagh for Michigan

Bradley Jay Slagh is a Republican member of the Michigan House of Representatives.

== Biography ==
Before being elected to the state legislature, Slagh worked in the finance industry. Slagh worked for both First Michigan Bank, and then for Byron Center State Bank. Slagh was elected to the Michigan Association of County Treasurers and served as the president in 2016.

Slagh successfully ran for the 90th district in the Michigan House of Representatives in 2018. He was reelected in 2020.

Following redistricting, Slagh ran in the 85th district in 2022, winning reelection. He was reelected in 2024.

== Election history ==
2018 Michigan House of Representatives election, 90th district
Party	Candidate	Votes	%
Republican	Bradley Slagh	24,421	65.69
Democratic	Christopher Banks	12,754	34.31
Total votes		37,175	100.0
Republican hold			

2020 Michigan House of Representatives election, 90th district
Party	Candidate	Votes	%
Republican	Bradley Slagh (incumbent)	32,446	64.22
Democratic	Christopher P. Banks	18,081	35.78
Total votes		50,527	100.0

2022 Michigan's 85th House of Representatives district general election
Party	Candidate	Votes	%
Republican	Bradley Slagh (incumbent)	32,848	70.08%
Democratic	Todd Avery	13,336	28.45%
Libertarian	Greg Parlmer II	688	1.47%
Total votes		46,872	100.0

2024 Michigan's 85th House of Representatives district general election
Party	Candidate	Votes	%
Republican	Bradley Slagh (incumbent)	39,199	70.39%
Democratic	Marcia Mansaray	16,490	29.61%
Total votes		55,689	100.0

Political offices
Preceded by Daniela Garcia	Michigan Representatives; 90th District; 2019–present	Succeeded by Incumbent
