= Daniela Garcia (politician) =

American politician

Daniela R. Garcia

Member of the Michigan House of Representatives from the 90th district
- In office January 1, 2015 – December 31, 2018
- Preceded by: Joseph Haveman
- Succeeded by: Bradley Slagh

Personal details
- Born: May 20, 1979 (age 47) Holland, Michigan
- Party: Republican
- Education: Catholic University of America; University of Michigan
- Occupation: Politician

Daniela Garcia (born May 20, 1979) is a former Republican member of the Michigan House of Representatives.

Garcia is a native of Holland, Michigan. Her father, Frank Garcia, was for a time superintendent of Holland Public Schools, and her mother, Yolanda Lopez Garcia, worked as a teacher in Holland Public Schools.

== Education ==
Garcia earned a bachelor's degree from University of Michigan. Garcia earned a master's degree in education policy and administration from Catholic University.

== Career ==
Garcia started her career as a policy advisor to Peter Hoekstra, a congressman. Garcia worked on the development of health care policy and educational policy.

On November 4, 2014, Garcia won the election and became a Republican member of Michigan House of Representatives for District 90. Garcia defeated James Haspas with 78.31% of the votes. On November 8, 2016, as an incumbent, Garcia won the election and continued serving District 90. Garcia defeated Mary M. Yedinak with 72.86% of the votes.

At the start of 2015 the Detroiter Magazine named her one of six Michigan legislators to watch.

In the August 2018 Michigan primary election, Garcia did not seek another term in the Michigan House of Representatives. Garcia unsuccessfully sought a seat in the Michigan State Senate for District 30. Garcia won 26.27% of the votes, having been defeated by Roger Victory, Joe Haveman, and Rett DeBoer.

In January 2019, Garcia was appointed as the Director of Outreach in the United States Department of Education's Office of Communications and Outreach.

== See also ==
- 2014 Michigan House of Representatives election
- 2016 Michigan House of Representatives election
