= Cedar Springs Public Schools =

School district in Michigan

Address
- 204 E Muskegon St. Cedar Springs, Kent, Michigan, 49319; United States

District information
- Grades: Pre-Kindergarten-12
- Superintendent: Scott B. Smith
- Schools: 8
- Budget: $66,843,000 2022-2023 expenditures
- NCES District ID: 2608520

Students and staff
- Students: 3,011 (2024-2025)
- Teachers: 175.15 (on an FTE basis) (2024-2025)
- Staff: 428.65 FTE (2024-2025)
- Student–teacher ratio: 17.19 (2024-2025)

Other information
- Website: www.csredhawks.org

Cedar Springs Public Schools is a public school district in Kent County, Michigan. It serves Cedar Springs and parts of the following townships: Algoma, Courtland, Nelson, Oakfield, Solon, and Spencer. It also serves a small part of Ensley Township in Newaygo County.

Except for the middle school, the district's schools share a campus in the town of Cedar Springs.

== History ==
Cedar Springs had a high school as early as 1880.

The high school was then located in the building on the southeast corner of East Muskegon Street and Northland Drive, on the present school campus. It was built around 1927.

The next building to house the high school was dedicated in August of 1959 and was located at 204 E. Muskegon Street. The present high school opened in November 1997.

Cedar Springs Middle School opened in fall 2005, and the former middle school, which had once been the high school, became Red Hawk Elementary.

== Secondary schools ==
Schools in Cedar Springs Public Schools district
| School | Address | Notes |
|---|---|---|
| Cedar Springs High School | 5212 17 Mile Rd. NE, Cedar Springs | Grades 9-12. Built 1997. |
| New Beginnings Alternative High School | 204 E Muskegon Street, Cedar Springs | 9th–12th grade |
| Cedar Springs Middle School | 4873 16 Mile Rd NE, Cedar Springs | Grades 6-8. Built 2005. |
| Cedar View Elementary | 280 Red Hawk Drive NE, Cedar Springs | Grades 4-5 |
| Beach Elementary | 340 Holton Drive NE, Cedar Springs | Grades 2-3 |
| Cedar Trails Elementary | 160 Red Hawk Drive NE, Cedar Springs | Grades PreK-1 |
| Cedar Springs Early Childhood Center | 204 E Muskegon Street, Cedar Springs | Preschool |
