= Oakfield Township, Michigan =

- Civil township
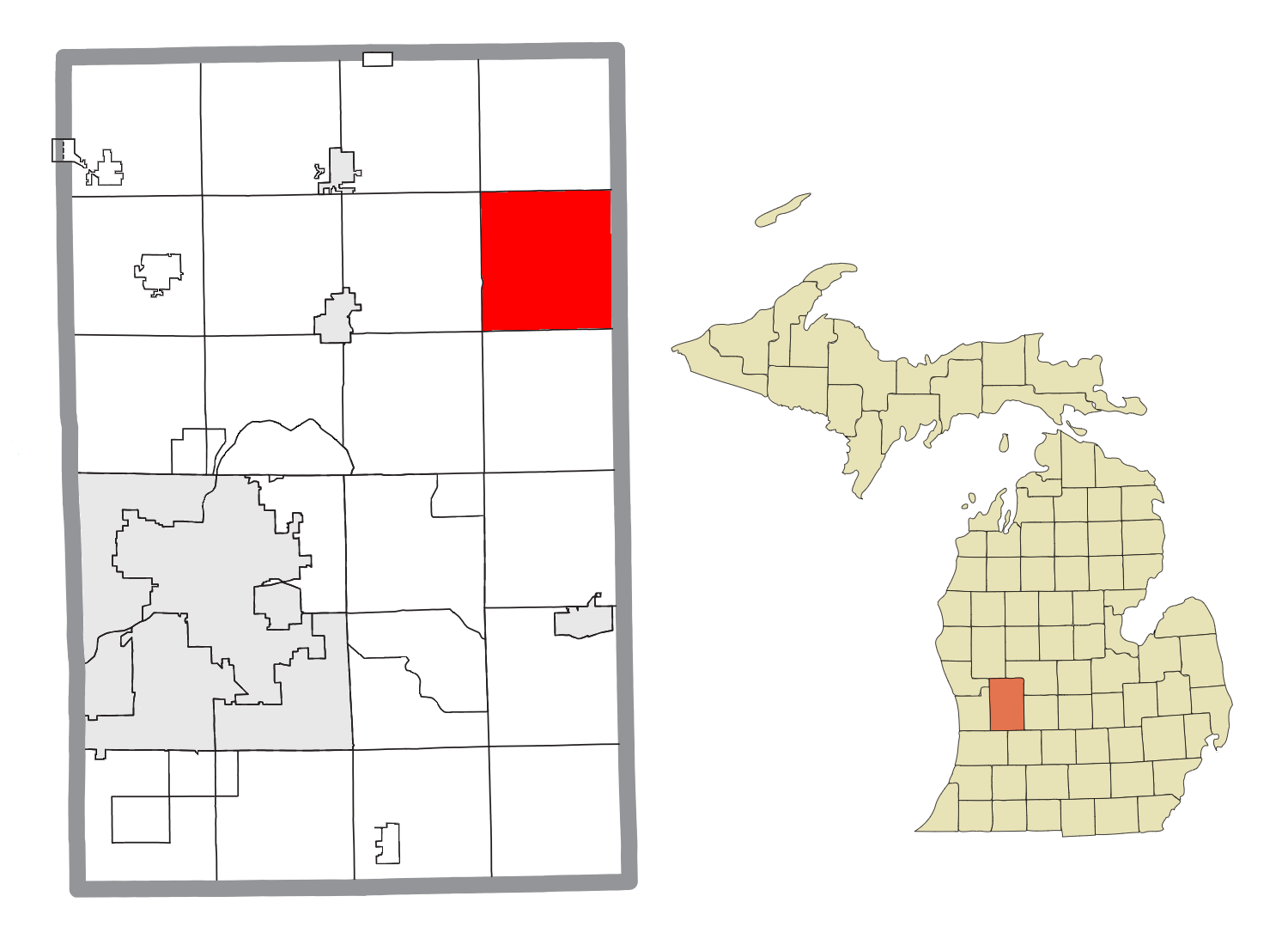
- Location within Kent County

- Location within the state of Michigan Location within the United States
- Coordinates: 43°09′44″N 85°21′50″W
- Country: United States
- State: Michigan
- County: Kent
- Settled: 1838
- Established: 1849

Government
  - Supervisor: William Dean
  - Clerk: Sue Trainer

Area
  - Total: 36.41 sq mi (94.30 km^{2})
  - Land: 33.81 sq mi (87.57 km^{2})
  - Water: 2.60 sq mi (6.73 km^{2})
- Elevation: 869 ft (265 m)

Population (2020)
  - Total: 6,107
  - Density: 171/sq mi (66/km^{2})
- Time zone: UTC-5 (Eastern (EST))
  - Summer (DST): UTC-4 (EDT)
- ZIP code(s): 48838 (Greenville); 49319 (Cedar Springs); 49341 (Rockford)
- Area code: 616
- FIPS code: 26-081-59580
- GNIS feature ID: 1626832
- Website: Official website

Oakfield Township is a civil township of Kent County in the U.S. state of Michigan. The population was 6,107 at the 2020 census. It is part of the Grand Rapids metropolitan area and is located about 20 miles (32 km) northeast of the city of Grand Rapids.

== History ==
The area was first settled as early as 1838 by William Davis and soon named Oakfield Township when it was established in 1849.

== Geography ==
According to the U.S. Census Bureau, the township has a total area of 36.41 square miles (94.30 km^{2}), of which 33.81 square miles (87.57 km^{2}) is land and 2.60 square miles (6.73 km^{2}) (7.14%) is water.

=== Major highways ===
- M-57 is runs west–east through the center of the township.

== Demographics ==
At the 2000 census, there were 5,058 people, 1,814 households and 1,440 families residing in the township. The population density was 146.1 inhabitants per square mile (56.4/km^{2}). There were 1,973 housing units at an average density of 57.0 per square mile (22.0/km^{2}). The racial makeup of the township was 97.96% White, 0.14% African American, 0.26% Native American, 0.34% Asian, 0.26% from other races, and 1.05% from two or more races. Hispanic or Latino of any race were 0.81% of the population.

There were 1,814 households, of which 37.4% had children under the age of 18 living with them, 68.2% were married couples living together, 5.9% had a female householder with no husband present, and 20.6% were non-families. 15.8% of all households were made up of individuals, and 4.2% had someone living alone who was 65 years of age or older. The average household size was 2.78 and the average family size was 3.09.

Age distribution was 28.3% under the age of 18, 6.1% from 18 to 24, 32.2% from 25 to 44, 25.1% from 45 to 64, and 8.3% who were 65 years of age or older. The median age was 37 years. For every 100 females, there were 105.9 males. For every 100 females age 18 and over, there were 103.8 males.

The median household income was $49,429, and the median family incomewas $51,866. Males had a median income of $41,928 versus $25,777 for females. The per capita income for the township was $20,463. About 6.9% of families and 7.2% of the population were below the poverty line, including 7.8% of those under age 18 and 1.2% of those age 65 or over.

== Education ==
Oakfield Township is served by four separate school districts. The majority of the township is served by Greenville Public Schools to the east in Montcalm County. The northwestern portion is served by Cedar Springs Public Schools, and the southwestern corner is served by Rockford Public Schools. A southern portion of the township is served by Belding Area School District in Montcalm County.

== Notable people ==
- Bryan Posthumus, Michigan state representative
