= Eureka Township, Michigan =

- Charter township
- Location within Michigan Location within the United States
- Coordinates: 43°9′29″N 85°15′5″W
- Country: United States
- State: Michigan
- County: Montcalm

Area
  - Total: 29.6 sq mi (77 km^{2})
  - Land: 28.7 sq mi (74 km^{2})
  - Water: 0.9 sq mi (2.3 km^{2})
- Elevation: 801 ft (244 m)

Population (2020)
  - Total: 4,211
  - Density: 146.6/sq mi (56.6/km^{2})
- Time zone: UTC-5 (Eastern (EST))
  - Summer (DST): UTC-4 (EDT)
- ZIP code: 48838 (Greenville)
- FIPS code: 26-117-26520
- GNIS feature ID: 1626251
- Website: eurekatownshipmi.gov

Eureka Township is a charter township of Montcalm County in the U.S. state of Michigan. The population was 4,211 at the 2020 census, up from 3,959 in 2010.

The township surrounds the city of Greenville, a separate municipality, and the Greenville post office, with ZIP code 48838, serves all of Eureka Township. Eureka Township was established in 1850.

== Geography ==
The township is in southern Montcalm County, bordered to the north by Montcalm Township, to the northeast by Sidney Township, to the east by Fairplain Township, to the south by Ionia County, and to the west by Kent County. The city of Greenville occupies what was originally the northern part of Eureka Township.

State highways M-57 and M-91 cross the township, intersecting in Greenville. M-57 leads east 20 miles (32 km) to Carson City and west 16 miles (26 km) to U.S. Route 131 near Edgerton, while M-91 leads south 6 miles (10 km) to its terminus near Belding and north 19 miles (31 km) to Lakeview.

According to the U.S. Census Bureau, Eureka Township has a total area of 29.6 square miles (77 km^{2}), of which 28.7 square miles (74 km^{2}) are land and 0.9 square miles (2.3 km^{2}), or 2.89%, are water. The township is drained by the Flat River, which flows through Greenville and across the southeast part of the township, part of the Grand River watershed. Wabasis Creek, a tributary of the Flat River, drains the southwest part of the township.

== Demographics ==
Historical population
Census	Pop.	Note	%±
1850	461		—
1860	988		114.3%
1870	968		−2.0%
1880	924		−4.5%
1890	933		1.0%
1900	816		−12.5%
1910	746		−8.6%
1920	714		−4.3%
1930	784		9.8%
1940	826		5.4%
1950	1,024		24.0%
1960	1,470		43.6%
1970	1,938		31.8%
1980	2,303		18.8%
1990	2,594		12.6%
2000	3,271		26.1%
2010	3,959		21.0%
2020	4,211		6.4%
U.S. Decennial Census

As of the census of 2000, there were 3,271 people, 1,179 households, and 929 families residing in the township. The population density was 110.7 inhabitants per square mile (42.7/km^{2}). There were 1,248 housing units at an average density of 42.2 per square mile (16.3/km^{2}). The racial makeup of the township was 96.36% White, 0.15% African American, 0.55% Native American, 0.43% Asian, 1.35% from other races, and 1.16% from two or more races. Hispanic or Latino of any race were 3.15% of the population.

There were 1,179 households, out of which 37.4% had children under the age of 18 living with them, 68.4% were married couples living together, 6.5% had a female householder with no husband present, and 21.2% were non-families. 17.2% of all households were made up of individuals, and 5.5% had someone living alone who was 65 years of age or older. The average household size was 2.77 and the average family size was 3.09.

In the township the population was spread out, with 27.9% under the age of 18, 7.1% from 18 to 24, 29.5% from 25 to 44, 25.1% from 45 to 64, and 10.4% who were 65 years of age or older. The median age was 37 years. For every 100 females, there were 102.9 males. For every 100 females age 18 and over, there were 102.3 males.

The median income for a household in the township was $50,566, and the median income for a family was $53,380. Males had a median income of $39,919 versus $28,173 for females. The per capita income for the township was $20,223. About 3.2% of families and 5.4% of the population were below the poverty line, including 4.1% of those under age 18 and 9.6% of those age 65 or over.
