= Spencer Township, Michigan =

- Civil township
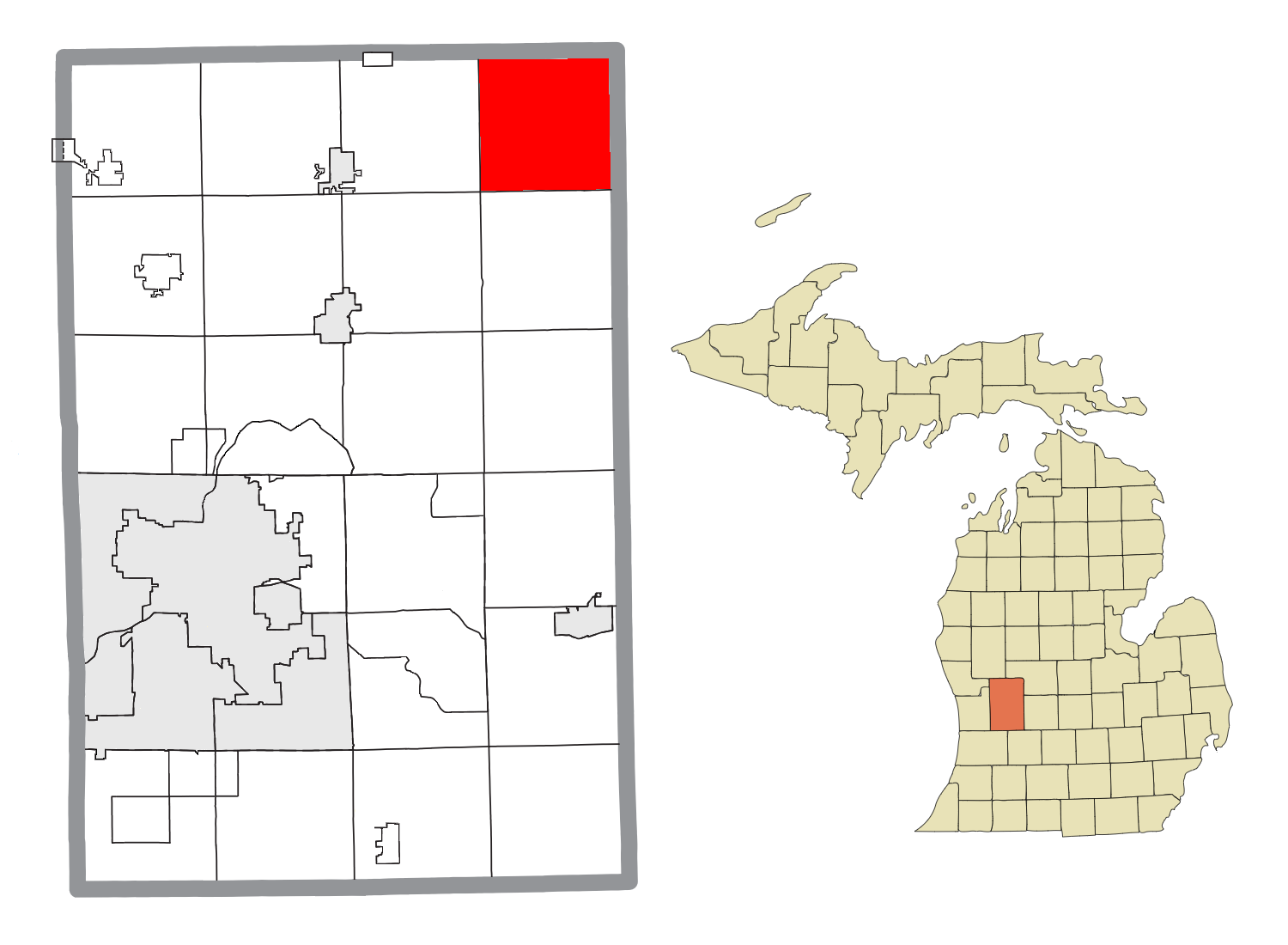
- Location within Kent County

- Location within the state of Michigan Location within the United States
- Coordinates: 43°15′09″N 85°21′30″W
- Country: United States
- State: Michigan
- County: Kent
- Settled: 1846
- Established: 1861

Government
  - Supervisor: Jeff Knapp
  - Clerk: Lisa Wright

Area
  - Total: 36.66 sq mi (94.95 km^{2})
  - Land: 33.97 sq mi (87.98 km^{2})
  - Water: 2.69 sq mi (6.97 km^{2})
- Elevation: 866 ft (264 m)

Population (2020)
  - Total: 4,163
  - Density: 122.6/sq mi (47.32/km^{2})
- Time zone: UTC-5 (Eastern (EST))
  - Summer (DST): UTC-4 (EDT)
- ZIP code(s): 49319 (Cedar Springs); 49326 (Gowen); 49343 (Sand Lake); 49347 (Trufant)
- Area code: 616
- FIPS code: 26-081-75560
- GNIS feature ID: 1627105
- Website: Official website

Spencer Township is a civil township of Kent County in the U.S. state of Michigan. The population was 4,163 at the 2020 census.

It is part of the Grand Rapids metropolitan area and is located in northeast Kent County about 25 miles (40 km) northeast of the city of Grand Rapids.

== History ==
The area was first settled as early as 1846 by Cyrus Thomas. In 1855, Thomas Spencer settled in the area and founded the community of Spencer Mills. He served as the first postmaster when a post office was established on October 17, 1857. The township was organized in 1861 under the name Celsus but was soon renamed after Spencer. The post office at Spencer Mills operated until September 30, 1903. Griswold was another historic community that began before 1877 around a lumber mill and a shingle mill on the Grand Rapids & Indiana Railroad. The Griswold post office operated from March 13, 1877 until August 31, 1900.

== Geography ==
According to the U.S. Census Bureau, the township has a total area of 36.66 square miles (94.95 km^{2}), of which 33.97 square miles (87.98 km^{2}) is land and 2.69 square miles (6.97 km^{2}) (7.34%) is water.

== Demographics ==
As of the census of 2000, there were 3,681 people, 1,357 households, and 1,028 families residing in the township. The population density was 104.9 inhabitants per square mile (40.5/km^{2}). There were 1,641 housing units at an average density of 46.8 per square mile (18.1/km^{2}). The racial makeup of the township was 96.82% White, 0.76% African American, 0.35% Native American, 0.41% Asian, 0.16% from other races, and 1.49% from two or more races. Hispanic or Latino of any race were 1.28% of the population.

There were 1,357 households, out of which 34.4% had children under the age of 18 living with them, 63.4% were married couples living together, 7.7% had a female householder with no husband present, and 24.2% were non-families. 18.6% of all households were made up of individuals, and 6.2% had someone living alone who was 65 years of age or older. The average household size was 2.67 and the average family size was 3.02.

In the township the population was spread out, with 27.3% under the age of 18, 7.4% from 18 to 24, 30.8% from 25 to 44, 24.1% from 45 to 64, and 10.5% who were 65 years of age or older. The median age was 37 years. For every 100 females, there were 106.8 males. For every 100 females age 18 and over, there were 106.6 males.

The median income for a household in the township was $51,765, and the median income for a family was $55,475. Males had a median income of $38,021 versus $27,733 for females. The per capita income for the township was $18,692. About 4.9% of families and 5.2% of the population were below the poverty line, including 3.9% of those under age 18 and 11.7% of those age 65 or over.

== Education ==
Spencer Township is served by three separate school districts. The western half of the township is served by Cedar Springs Public Schools, and the eastern half is served by Greenville Public Schools to the east in Montcalm County. The northern portion of the township is served by Lakeview Community Schools in Montcalm County.
