= Wells Airport =

Public airport in Courtland Township

- IATA: none; ICAO: none; FAA LID: 35C

Summary
- Airport type: Public
- Owner/Operator: Terry Finger
- Location: Rockford, Michigan
- Time zone: UTC−05:00 (-5)
  - Summer (DST): UTC−04:00 (-4)
- Elevation AMSL: 890 ft / 271 m
- Coordinates: 43°07′42″N 085°30′19″W
- Interactive map of Wells Airport

Runways
Direction	Length		Surface
Direction	ft	m	Surface
18/36	2,200	671	Turf

Statistics (2021)
- Aircraft operations: 396
- Source: Federal Aviation Administration

Wells Airport (FAA LID: 35C) is a privately owned, public-use airport located in Courtland Township three miles (5 km) northeast of the central business district of Rockford, in Kent County, Michigan, United States.

== Facilities and aircraft ==
Wells Airport covers an area of 60 acres (24 ha) and has one runway, designated as runway 18/36. The runway measures 2,200 x 100 ft (671 x 30 m) and has a turf surface.

For the 12-month period ending December 31, 2021, the airport had 396 general aviation aircraft operations, an average of 33 per month. This is down from 1,076 in 2004. In 2021, 8 aircraft were based at the airport: 7 single-engine airplanes and 1 glider.

== See also ==
- List of airports in Michigan
