= Courtland Township, Michigan =

Township in Michigan, United States

- Civil township
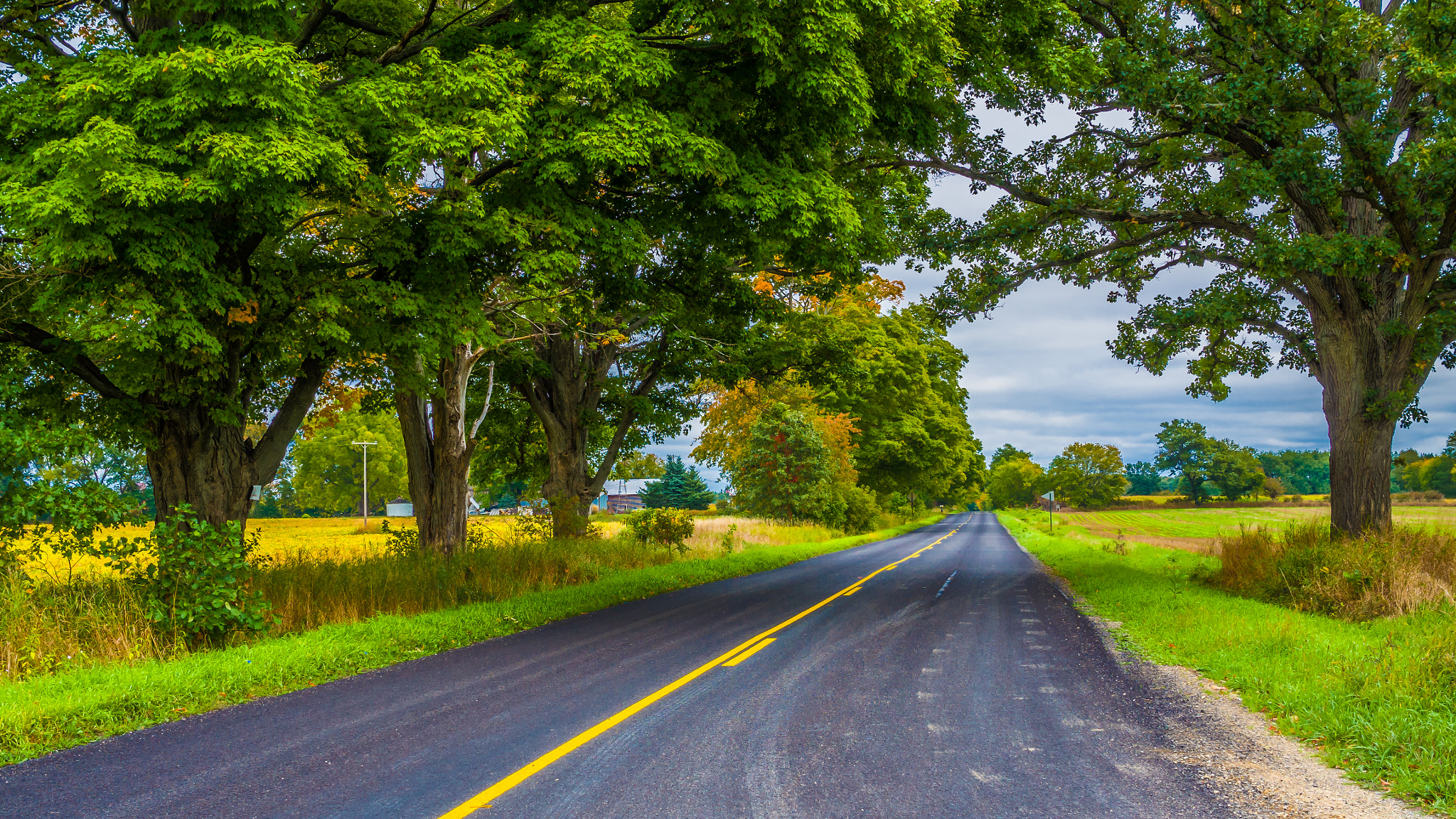
- 13 Mile Road in Courtland Township

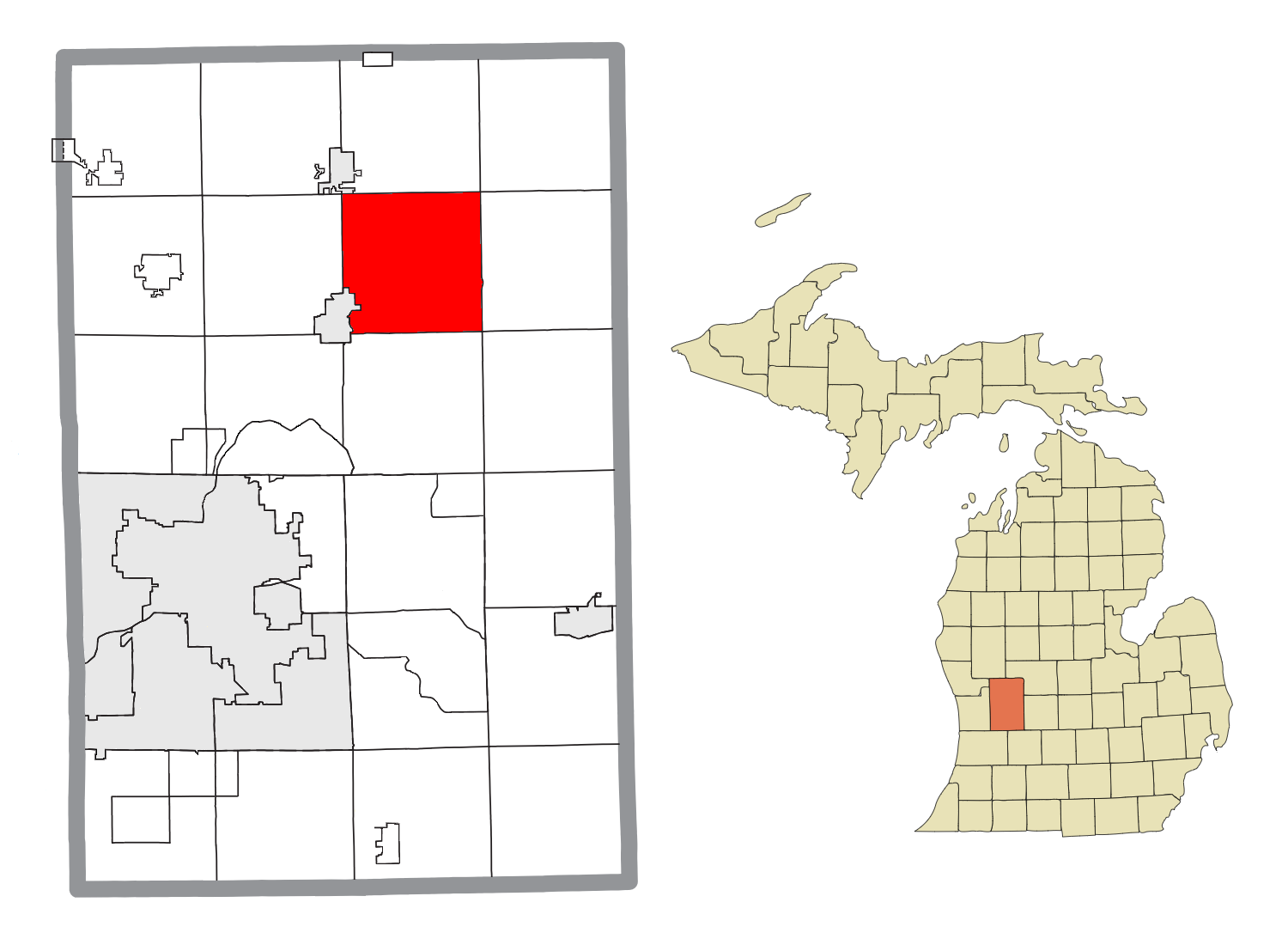
- Location within Kent County

- Location within the state of Michigan Location within the United States
- Coordinates: 43°09′29″N 85°29′49″W
- Country: United States
- State: Michigan
- County: Kent
- Established: 1839

Government
  - Supervisor: Matthew McConnon
  - Clerk: Susan Hartman

Area
  - Total: 35.97 sq mi (93.16 km^{2})
  - Land: 34.70 sq mi (89.87 km^{2})
  - Water: 1.27 sq mi (3.29 km^{2})
- Elevation: 906 ft (276 m)

Population (2020)
  - Total: 9,005
  - Density: 259.5/sq mi (100.2/km^{2})
- Time zone: UTC-5 (Eastern (EST))
  - Summer (DST): UTC-4 (EDT)
- ZIP code(s): 49319 (Cedar Springs); 49341, 49351 (Rockford)
- Area code: 616
- FIPS code: 26-081-18500
- GNIS feature ID: 1626137
- Website: Official website

Courtland Township is a civil township of Kent County in the U.S. state of Michigan. The population was 9,005 at the 2020 census, which was an increase from 7,678 at the 2010 census.

The township is part of the Grand Rapids metropolitan area and is located about 10 miles (16 km) northeast of the city of Grand Rapids.

== History ==
The first settler in the area was Barton Johnson in 1838. He settled the community of Evans along a railway station on the early Toledo, Saginaw and Muskegon Railway. Johnson and Alexander Dean settled the community of Courtland Center in 1839. It was named after the township, which was organized in the same year. The community was given its own post office named Courtland from January 30, 1841 to November 10, 1860. Another post office named Courtland Center was in operation from October 24, 1856 until February 15, 1901. The community of Sheffield was also a station on the Toledo, Saginaw & Muskegon Railroad that was established in 1888. Sheffield had its own post office from March 6, 1891 until April 30, 1906.

== Geography ==
According to the U.S. Census Bureau, the township has a total area of 35.97 square miles (93.16 km^{2}), of which 34.70 square miles (89.87 km^{2}) is land and 1.27 square miles (3.29 km^{2}) (3.53%) is water.

== Transportation ==
=== Airport ===
- Wells Airport is located in the township.

=== Major highways ===
- US 131 runs south–north just to the west of the township boundary.
- M-57 (14 Mile Road) runs east–west through the center of the township.

== Demographics ==
As of the census of 2000, there were 5,817 people, 1,936 households, and 1,635 families residing in the township. The population density was 164.0 inhabitants per square mile (63.3/km^{2}). There were 2,022 housing units at an average density of 57.0 per square mile (22.0/km^{2}). The racial makeup of the township was 98.07% White, 0.19% African American, 0.34% Native American, 0.26% Asian, 0.33% from other races, and 0.81% from two or more races. Hispanic or Latino of any race were 1.29% of the population.

There were 1,936 households, out of which 44.0% had children under the age of 18 living with them, 77.4% were married couples living together, 4.6% had a female householder with no husband present, and 15.5% were non-families. 12.3% of all households were made up of individuals, and 4.6% had someone living alone who was 65 years of age or older. The average household size was 3.00 and the average family size was 3.26.

In the township the population was spread out, with 30.5% under the age of 18, 6.4% from 18 to 24, 32.2% from 25 to 44, 23.8% from 45 to 64, and 7.2% who were 65 years of age or older. The median age was 36 years. For every 100 females, there were 105.5 males. For every 100 females age 18 and over, there were 103.2 males.

The median income for a household in the township was $64,430, and the median income for a family was $69,306. Males had a median income of $50,392 versus $29,744 for females. The per capita income for the township was $26,254. About 2.0% of families and 2.4% of the population were below the poverty line, including 2.0% of those under age 18 and 12.0% of those age 65 or over.

== Education ==
Courtland Township is served by two different public school districts. The northern portion of the township is served by Cedar Springs Public Schools, while the southern portion is served by Rockford Public Schools.
