= Greenville, Michigan =

- City
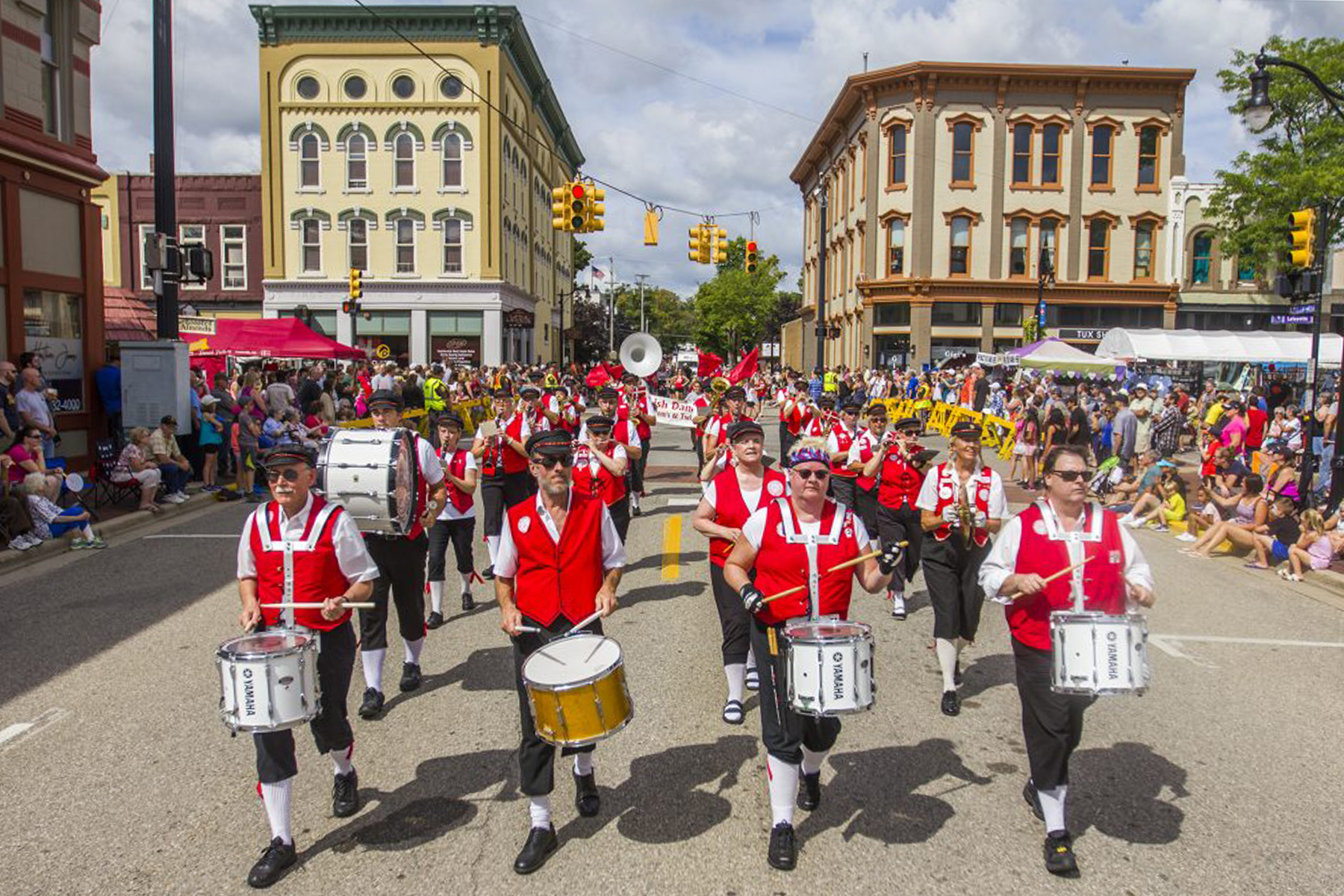
- Nicknames: "The Danish Festival City", "Birthplace of Meijer"
- Motto: Living Large in a Small Town
- Location of Greenville within Montcalm County and the state of Michigan
- Coordinates: 43°10′47″N 85°15′12″W
- Country: United States
- State: Michigan
- County: Montcalm
- Founded: 1844
- Incorporated: 1867 (village); 1871 (city)

Government
  - Mayor: Jeff Scoby

Area
  - Total: 6.65 sq mi (17.23 km^{2})
  - Land: 6.34 sq mi (16.43 km^{2})
  - Water: 0.31 sq mi (0.80 km^{2})
- Elevation: 840 ft (260 m)

Population (2020)
  - Total: 8,816
  - Density: 1,390.0/sq mi (536.67/km^{2})
- Time zone: UTC-5 (Eastern (EST))
  - Summer (DST): UTC-4 (EDT)
- ZIP code: 48838
- Area code: 616
- FIPS code: 26-35100
- GNIS feature ID: 1626401
- Website: www.greenvillemi.org

Greenville is a city in the Lower Peninsula of the U.S. state of Michigan. With a population of 8,816 at the 2020 census, it is the most populous city in Montcalm County. The city was the birthplace of the Meijer superstore chain.

== History ==
Greenville is named after its founder, John Green, who settled in the wilderness of the southwest part of Montcalm County in 1844. Green constructed a sawmill on the Flat River that is credited for attracting other settlers. The newly formed "Green's Village" attracted many people of Danish origin who followed another early Danish settler's positive letters home regarding the area. Because of the town's heritage, Greenville celebrates the Danish Festival every year on the third weekend of August. A post office was established on January 20, 1848, with Abel French as the first postmaster. John Green had the village platted in 1853, and it was a station on the Detroit, Grand Rapids and Western Railroad. Greenville incorporated as a village in 1867 and as a city in 1871.

Hendrik Meijer, founder of Meijer's stores, moved to Greenville after immigrating to the United States from the Netherlands. He was initially a barber, but the Great Depression and lack of a proper grocery on his side of town led him to open his own store in 1934. Meijer corporation now operates stores throughout the Midwest. Hendrik's son Fred Meijer, principal architect of the modern Meijer chain, is a native son.

Greenville is home to the Fighting Falcon, the lead plane of a wave of gliders during World War II's Operation Overlord. The Falcon was purchased with funds raised by the schoolchildren of the city, and was designated the lead aircraft in recognition of this achievement.

Since the foundation of Ranney Refrigerator Co. in 1892, the town has been known as the "Refrigerator Capital of the World". It has also been home to the Gibson, White Consolidated, Frigidaire, and until recently, the Electrolux refrigerator factory. Electrolux closed the Greenville facility in early 2006, as it was in the process of relocating the factory to Ciudad Juárez in Mexico. This move impacted 2,700 employees and their families.

The city was to become the epicenter of "green" technology with the addition of solar panel manufacturer United Solar Ovonic; however, that enterprise filed for bankruptcy. It is also home to the new manufacturing and design center of Northland Marvel, an undercounter refrigeration company that just became a part of the UK-based AgaRangemaster group.

Lafayette Street, the downtown district, was placed on the National and State Register of Historic Places in November 2008.

== Geography ==
Greenville is in southwestern Montcalm County, bordered nearly on all sides by Eureka Township and for a short distance to the north by Montcalm Township. It is 16 miles (26 km) by road southwest of Stanton, the Montcalm county seat, and 33 miles (53 km) northeast of Grand Rapids.

According to the United States Census Bureau, the city has a total area of 6.65 square miles (17.22 km^{2}), of which 6.34 square miles (16.42 km^{2}) are land and 0.31 square miles (0.80 km^{2}), or 4.67%, are water. The Flat River passes through the city, flowing south to join the Grand River at Lowell. Greenville contains three navigable lakes within its city limits, Baldwin, Manoka, and Como. It also contains many unnamed ponds, a peat bog, and seasonal wet lands.

The Greenville post office, with ZIP code 48838, also serves all of Eureka Township, a large portion of Montcalm Township and a smaller area of Pine Township to the north, Fairplain Township to the east, a small area of Otisco Township in Ionia County to the south, and a large part of Oakfield Township to the west and a smaller part of Grattan Township to the southwest, both in Kent County.

=== Major highways ===
- M-57 runs east-west through the center of Greenville as Washington Street.
- M-91 runs north-south through Greenville as Lafayette Street, crossing M-57 in the center of town.

== Climate ==
The climatic region is typified by large seasonal temperature differences, with warm to hot (and often humid) summers and cold (sometimes severely cold) winters. According to the Köppen climate classification system, Greenville has a humid continental climate, abbreviated "Dfb" on climate maps.

Climate data for Greenville 2 NNE, Michigan (1991–2020 normals, extremes 1912–present)
Month	Jan	Feb	Mar	Apr	May	Jun	Jul	Aug	Sep	Oct	Nov	Dec	Year
Record high °F (°C)	64 (18)	70 (21)	88 (31)	88 (31)	93 (34)	101 (38)	108 (42)	104 (40)	101 (38)	89 (32)	80 (27)	70 (21)	108 (42)
Mean daily maximum °F (°C)	31.2 (−0.4)	34.2 (1.2)	45.5 (7.5)	59.3 (15.2)	71.1 (21.7)	80.4 (26.9)	84.3 (29.1)	82.1 (27.8)	75.2 (24.0)	62.1 (16.7)	47.8 (8.8)	36.0 (2.2)	59.1 (15.1)
Daily mean °F (°C)	22.0 (−5.6)	23.8 (−4.6)	33.5 (0.8)	45.7 (7.6)	57.4 (14.1)	66.5 (19.2)	70.3 (21.3)	68.5 (20.3)	61.3 (16.3)	49.6 (9.8)	37.6 (3.1)	27.3 (−2.6)	47.0 (8.3)
Mean daily minimum °F (°C)	12.9 (−10.6)	13.3 (−10.4)	21.5 (−5.8)	32.0 (0.0)	43.7 (6.5)	52.6 (11.4)	56.3 (13.5)	54.9 (12.7)	47.5 (8.6)	37.0 (2.8)	27.4 (−2.6)	18.6 (−7.4)	34.8 (1.6)
Record low °F (°C)	−26 (−32)	−25 (−32)	−18 (−28)	5 (−15)	20 (−7)	30 (−1)	38 (3)	34 (1)	24 (−4)	14 (−10)	−4 (−20)	−18 (−28)	−26 (−32)
Average precipitation inches (mm)	2.23 (57)	1.94 (49)	2.43 (62)	3.90 (99)	4.05 (103)	3.62 (92)	3.05 (77)	3.50 (89)	3.04 (77)	3.54 (90)	2.98 (76)	2.37 (60)	36.65 (931)
Average snowfall inches (cm)	20.3 (52)	16.5 (42)	9.4 (24)	2.5 (6.4)	0.0 (0.0)	0.0 (0.0)	0.0 (0.0)	0.0 (0.0)	0.0 (0.0)	0.4 (1.0)	5.0 (13)	18.8 (48)	72.9 (185)
Average precipitation days (≥ 0.01 in)	15.2	11.5	10.8	12.1	12.2	9.7	9.1	9.7	9.9	12.3	12.5	14.4	139.4
Average snowy days (≥ 0.1 in)	14.6	10.7	5.9	2.0	0.0	0.0	0.0	0.0	0.0	0.3	3.7	11.8	49.0
Source: NOAA

== Recreation ==
=== Swimming ===
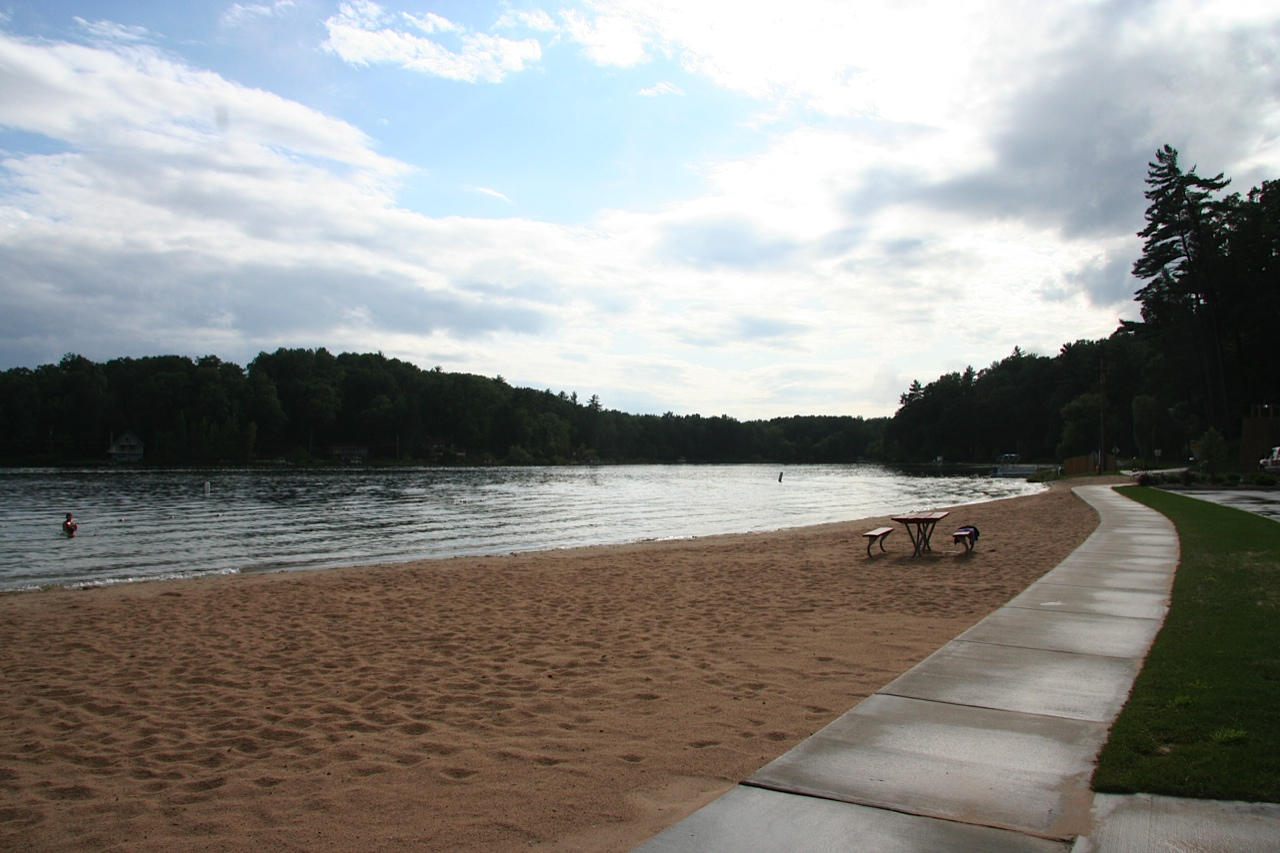
Baldwin Lake Beach

Baldwin Lake Beach offers a pavilion and two acres of white sand beach on the cool shores of Baldwin Lake. The swimming area is small with no docks in water off the beach. The pavilion has vending machines and changing rooms. No lifeguard oversees swimmers.

=== Biking ===
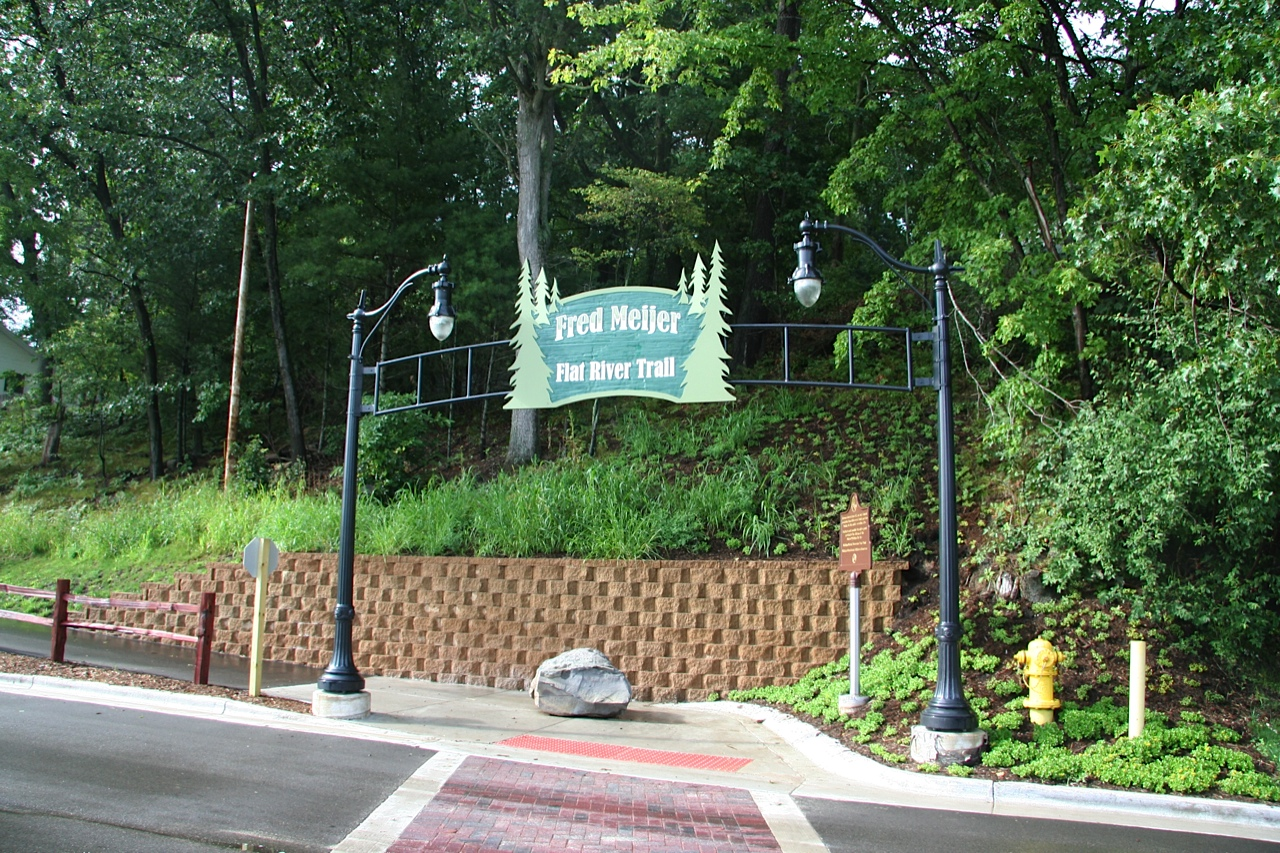
Greenville Michigan Fred Meijer Trail

Greenville has a well-developed trail system. The eight mile long Fred Meijer Flat River Trail connects Greenville's major parks and circumnavigates the city. Greenville is also the terminus of the 41 mile long Fred Meijer Heartland Trail. This trail connects Greenville to Alma, and various other communities in Montcalm and Gratiot counties. Mountain biking is available at both the Shearer Road and Edward's Creek mountain bike paths.

=== Skiing ===
Tower Mountain Ski Area

The Tower Mountain ski area offers the county's only tow rope operated skiing/sledding area and is free to the public. Greenville also offers miles of cross country skiing trails at both the Greenville Community Center and along the snow-covered bike trails in the winter.

=== Boating ===
Canoe access to the Flat River is available at Jackson's Landing, a popular starting point for paddling through the Flat River State Game area.

=== Ice fishing ===
Greenville has a culture of ice shanty building and annually displays some of these on the area's fishing lakes.

== Historic landmarks ==
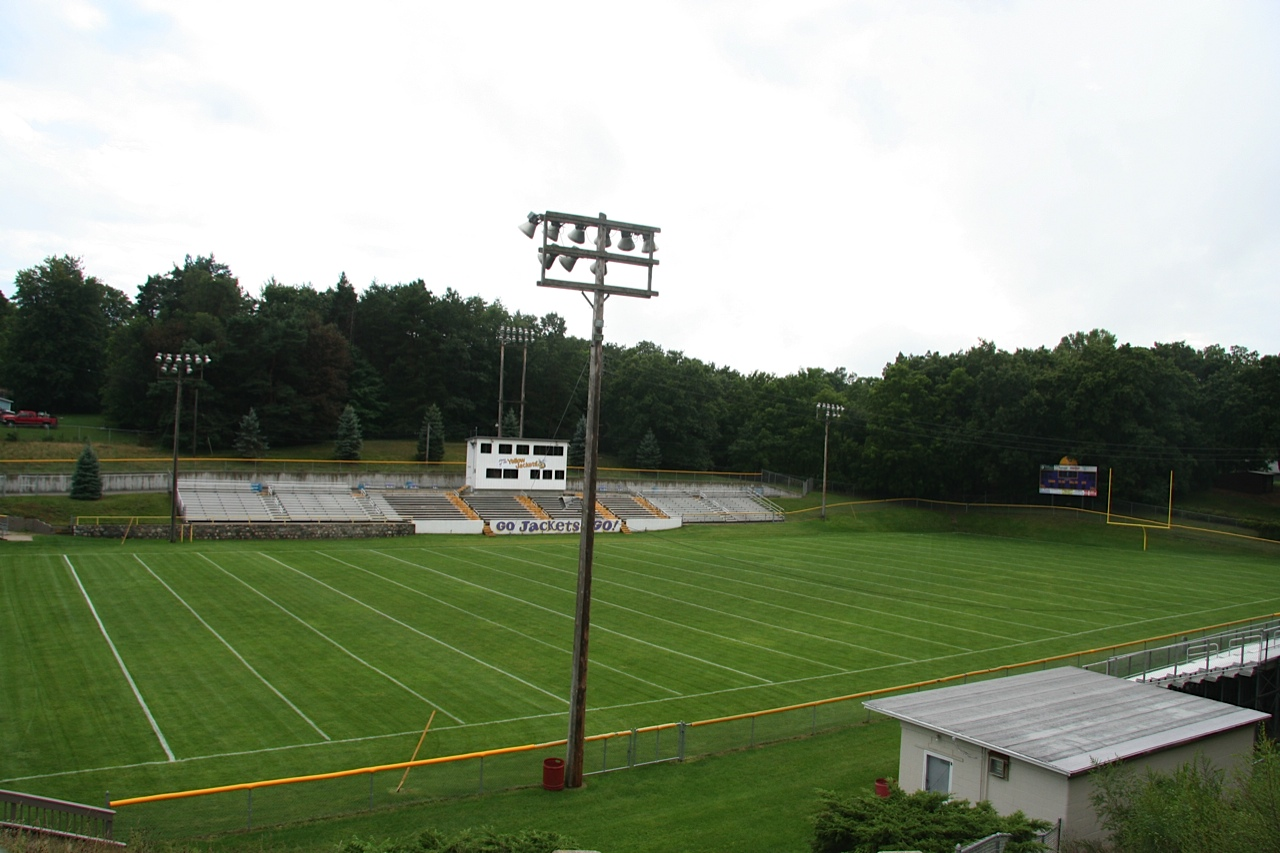
Black Field

First Congregational Church

Washington Street Armory circa 2008

=== Black Field ===
This historic stadium was carved into a hillside south of the Union School building and was home to Greenville High School's football team since 1933. The field was donated to the school by Dr. D. K. Black and was officially dedicated on October 15, 1936. This field has since been retired and a new stadium has been built on site at Greenville Senior High.

=== The Fighting Falcon Museum ===
This historical structure was built in 1902 and was originally the Cass St School building. The building was then used as the Board of Education before being renovated and turned into the Fighting Falcon Museum.

=== First Congregational Church ===
The multi-steepled First Congregational Church was completed on June 6, 1880. The front of the building is adorned with a twelve-foot wide rose window. This building is actually the second First Congregational Church in Greenville. The original First Congregational Church was built in 1856, bought by Saint Paul's Episcopal Church and moved down the street.

=== Historic Main Street ===
Greenville's original shopping district on Lafayette street showcases early 20th century architecture from the bluffs of the Flat River to Greenville's city hall. Among longtime local businesses is Kemp Insurance Sure which has been located on Lafayette since 1879. Currently, several buildings are undergoing facade renovation, restoring them to original construction.

=== The Little Mermaid ===
A copy of Denmark's The Little Mermaid sits along the banks of the Flat River. This little statue generated an international controversy when the City of Greenville was sued for copyright infringement by the heirs of the original sculptor, Edvard Eriksen.

=== The Flat River Historical Museum ===
Established October 10, 1972, the Flat River Historical Museum stands on the banks of the Flat River on the same site where John Green built his cabin, a dam across the flat river, and the sawmill that brought jobs and the village's first residents.

=== Historic Armory ===
The Washington Street Armory was un-commissioned after the completion of the modern armory that was built next door. In 1981 it was converted into a roller rink.

The story book castle murals were completed by a local artist, Eston King. A fire in 2006 caused extensive damage to the roof and it was demolished in 2011.

== Culture ==
=== Danish festival ===
The third weekend in August celebrates Greenville's Danish heritage as well as its modern-day Midwestern spirit.

=== Farming ===
Greenville's farms are located in Montcalm County's Soil Preservation District. Greenville is surrounded by potato, corn, dairy, and Christmas tree farms. Greenville was home to Ore-Ida's tater tots division, until Ore-Ida consolidated its operation in 1986 and Greenville's farmers were forced to diversify their crops.

Greenville has an active 4H program and each summer hosts the Montcalm County 4H Fair. This fair displays livestock competitions, tractors pulls, a busy midway, and a demolition derby.

=== Arts ===
Greenville is home to an active arts scene. The Greenville Area Recreation and Community Center is home to the Hans Christian Andersen Theater (HCAT), which puts on productions for children, teens, and adults. The Flat River Community Players also stages productions of American plays at the Greenville Community Center Theater. The award-winning Greenville High School music program consists of a marching band, concert band, jazz band, orchestra, symphonic orchestra, and the Village Green singers.

== Local media ==
The area is served by the daily newspaper, The Daily News, headquartered in Greenville. The Daily News has a circulation around 4,500. The city has one radio station, WGLM, simulcast on FM and AM as "M106-3" and "M-1380".

== Demographics ==
Historical population
Census	Pop.	Note	%±
1860	398		—
1870	1,807		354.0%
1880	3,144		74.0%
1890	3,056		−2.8%
1900	3,381		10.6%
1910	4,045		19.6%
1920	4,304		6.4%
1930	4,730		9.9%
1940	5,321		12.5%
1950	6,668		25.3%
1960	7,440		11.6%
1970	7,493		0.7%
1980	8,019		7.0%
1990	8,101		1.0%
2000	7,935		−2.0%
2010	8,481		6.9%
2020	8,816		4.0%
U.S. Decennial Census

=== 2020 census ===
As of the 2020 census, Greenville had a population of 8,816. The median age was 36.3 years. 24.1% of residents were under the age of 18 and 17.5% of residents were 65 years of age or older. For every 100 females there were 91.9 males, and for every 100 females age 18 and over there were 88.4 males age 18 and over.

99.1% of residents lived in urban areas, while 0.9% lived in rural areas.

There were 3,637 households in Greenville, of which 29.6% had children under the age of 18 living in them. Of all households, 35.9% were married-couple households, 20.3% were households with a male householder and no spouse or partner present, and 34.3% were households with a female householder and no spouse or partner present. About 34.0% of all households were made up of individuals and 14.4% had someone living alone who was 65 years of age or older.

There were 3,906 housing units, of which 6.9% were vacant. The homeowner vacancy rate was 1.9% and the rental vacancy rate was 6.8%.

Racial composition as of the 2020 census
Race	Number	Percent
White	8,009	90.8%
Black or African American	57	0.6%
American Indian and Alaska Native	40	0.5%
Asian	35	0.4%
Native Hawaiian and Other Pacific Islander	14	0.2%
Some other race	140	1.6%
Two or more races	521	5.9%
Hispanic or Latino (of any race)	478	5.4%

=== 2010 census ===
As of the census of 2010, there were 8,481 people, 3,464 households, and 2,138 families residing in the city. The population density was 1,337.7 inhabitants per square mile (516.5/km^{2}). There were 3,826 housing units at an average density of 603.5 per square mile (233.0/km^{2}). The racial makeup of the city was 94.3% White, 0.3% African American, 0.5% Native American, 0.7% Asian, 0.1% Pacific Islander, 1.8% from other races, and 2.4% from two or more races. Hispanic or Latino of any race were 4.9% of the population.

There were 3,464 households, of which 35.2% had children under the age of 18 living with them, 38.8% were married couples living together, 17.1% had a female householder with no husband present, 5.8% had a male householder with no wife present, and 38.3% were non-families. 32.0% of all households were made up of individuals, and 13.8% had someone living alone who was 65 years of age or older. The average household size was 2.39 and the average family size was 2.98.

The median age in the city was 34.7 years. 26.6% of residents were under the age of 18; 9.4% were between the ages of 18 and 24; 26.3% were from 25 to 44; 22.4% were from 45 to 64; and 15.2% were 65 years of age or older. The gender makeup of the city was 47.2% male and 52.8% female.

=== 2000 census ===
As of 2000 the median income for a household in the city was $30,453, and the median income for a family was $35,050. Males had a median income of $32,500 versus $23,338 for females. The per capita income for the city was $15,933. About 9.4% of families and 15.2% of the population were below the poverty line, including 24.1% of those under age 18 and 6.6% of those age 65 or over.

== Notable residents ==
- Frederick C. Bock, bomber pilot
- Frederik Meijer, businessman
- Mike Vining, sergeant major
- Ivy Winters, drag queen
- Isaac Holmes, incel YouTuber known online as “Marshall Mathers the 4th”
- Justin Zimmer, football player
- Ty Hallock, football player
- Richard Brock, US Marine
- Alex Kemp, American football official
