= Chris Afendoulis =

American politician (born 1962)

Member of the Michigan House of Representatives from the 73rd district
- In office January 1, 2015 – January 1, 2019
- Preceded by: Peter MacGregor
- Succeeded by: Lynn Afendoulis

Personal details
- Born: April 28, 1962 (age 64)
- Party: Republican
- Spouse: Phyllis Afendoulis
- Children: 3
- Education: University of Michigan (BBA)
- Occupation: Accountant and politician
- Website: gophouse.org/representatives/westmi/afendoulis/

Chris Afendoulis (born April 28, 1962) is a former Republican Member of the Michigan House of Representatives, he was first elected in 2014 and represented the 73rd District from 2015 to 2019, he was succeeded by his cousin Lynn Afendoulis.

== Early life ==
Afendoulis was raised in Grand Rapids Charter Township, Michigan and attended Forest Hills Public Schools, graduating from Forest Hills Northern High School in 1980. He received a Bachelor of Business Administration in 1984 from the University of Michigan's Ross School of Business.

== Professional career ==
Afendoulis is a Certified Public Accountant and worked as a financial executive for an automotive parts supplier. He is co-owner of a tuxedo store in Plainfield Township which was founded in 1947 by his father and two uncles.

== Political career ==
Afendoulis was appointed by the Kent County Commission to a three-year term on the John Ball Zoo Advisory Board in January 2003. He served as a Trustee of Grand Rapids Township from 2004 until 2007 when he became Township Treasurer, serving in that position until 2015 after being re-elected in 2008 and 2012.

Afendoulis was elected to represent Michigan's 73rd District in the Michigan House of Representatives in 2014, defeating Mary Polonowski following the departure of Peter MacGregor who went to serve in the Michigan Senate. Afendoulis was re-elected in 2016, defeating Democrat Deb Havens. In 2018, he ran to represent the 29th District in the Michigan Senate, but subsequently lost to Democrat Winnie Brinks.

=== Electoral history ===
2014 General Election — Michigan's 73rd State House of Representatives District
Party	Candidate	Votes	%	±%
Republican	Chris Afendoulis	24,256	67.72	
Democratic	Mary Polonowski	11,561	32.28	

2016 General Election — Michigan's 73rd State House of Representatives District
Party	Candidate	Votes	%	±%
Republican	Chris Afendoulis	35,216	63.76	
Democratic	Deb Havens	17,855	32.32	
Libertarian	Ron Heeren	2,165	3.92	

2018 General Election — Michigan's 29th State Senate District
Party	Candidate	Votes	%	±%
Republican	Chris Afendoulis	50,225	40.43	
Democratic	Winnie Brinks	70,715	56.92	
Libertarian	Robert VanNoller	1,840	1.48	
Working Class	Louis Palus	1,445	1.16	
