= Lynn Afendoulis =

American politician (born 1958)

Member of the Michigan House of Representatives from the 73rd district
- In office January 1, 2019 – January 1, 2021
- Preceded by: Chris Afendoulis
- Succeeded by: Bryan Posthumus

Personal details
- Born: November 3, 1958 (age 67) Grand Rapids, Michigan, U.S.
- Party: Republican
- Children: 2
- Education: Michigan State University (BA)
- Website: Party website

Lynn Afendoulis (born November 3, 1958) is Michigan politician who is a member of the Michigan House of Representatives from the 90th district. A Republican, she served as a member of Michigan House of Representatives from the 73rd district from 2019 to 2021.

== Early life and education ==
Afendoulis was born in Grand Rapids, Michigan, the daughter of a restaurant owner and teacher. Afendoulis is of Greek ancestry: her grandparents are ethnic Greek immigrants from Greece and Turkey.

Afendoulis attended Miami University before earning a Bachelor of Arts in journalism from Michigan State University.

== Career ==
=== Media career ===
In 1981, Afendoulis started her career as a reporter for The Grand Rapids Press until 1987. In 1987, Afendoulis became a reporter for The Tampa Tribune until 1989. In 1989, Afendoulis became a Communications/Public Relations Manager for the Bay Plaza Companies in St. Petersburg, Florida. In 1995, Afendoulis was a consultant for The Greystone Group. Since 2003, Afendoulis was a Director of Corporate Communications and Community Relations for Universal Forest Products.

=== Political career ===
In August 2018, Afendoulis won the primary election for Michigan House of Representatives for District 73. Incumbent Chris Afendoulis, who is her cousin, had run for the Michigan Senate. On November 6, 2018, Afendoulis won the election against Bill Saxton and became a member of the Michigan House of Representatives for District 73. On December 18, 2018, Afendoulis was officially sworn in by House Clerk Gary Randall.

In June 2019, Afendoulis introduced a bill that would allow only the Michigan and United States flag to be flown on state office buildings, claiming that it was inappropriate to promote social policy. This bill was authored by Afendoulis as a rebuke to Governor Gretchen Whitmer, who ordered the gay pride flag to be flown at the Romney building in mid-June to commemorate Pride Month. Widmer announced the flag order on Twitter including a video. In the same month, reporter Susan J. Demas penned an op-ed titled, "Same-sex marriage has been legal for 4 years. A Michigan Republican still thinks homophobia is a winning ticket to Congress," referencing Afendoulis's as the author of the bill stating that she "has decided to get lathered up over a couple LGBTQ rainbow flags in hopes that it’s her ticket to Congress. The stunt comes more than four years after a conservative U.S. Supreme Court ruled that same-sex marriage is the law of the land, because truly, we’re living in the dumbest timeline." Demas noted in her commentary that she had reached out to Afendoulis with the question: “Is this in response to Gov. Gretchen Whitmer flying LGBTQ Pride flags for Pride month? I am not aware of any other ‘social movement’ flags. Does Rep. Afendoulis support LGBTQ rights and same-sex marriage?”. Afendoulis failed to respond.

In June 2020 following the George Floyd protests in Grand Rapids, she proposed a bill to punish those who participate in riots with terrorism charges of up to a 20-year felony sentence in, with Afendoulis stating "We want prosecutors to be able to charge them as terrorists. As social terrorists".

Afendoulis ran for the United States House of Representatives in Michigan's 3rd congressional district in the 2020 elections. She lost the August 4 primary election to Peter Meijer.

== Personal life ==
Afendoulis has two children. Afendoulis resides in Rockford, Michigan.

== See also ==
- 2018 Michigan House of Representatives election
