= Solon Township, Kent County, Michigan =

Solon Township, Michigan
- Civil township
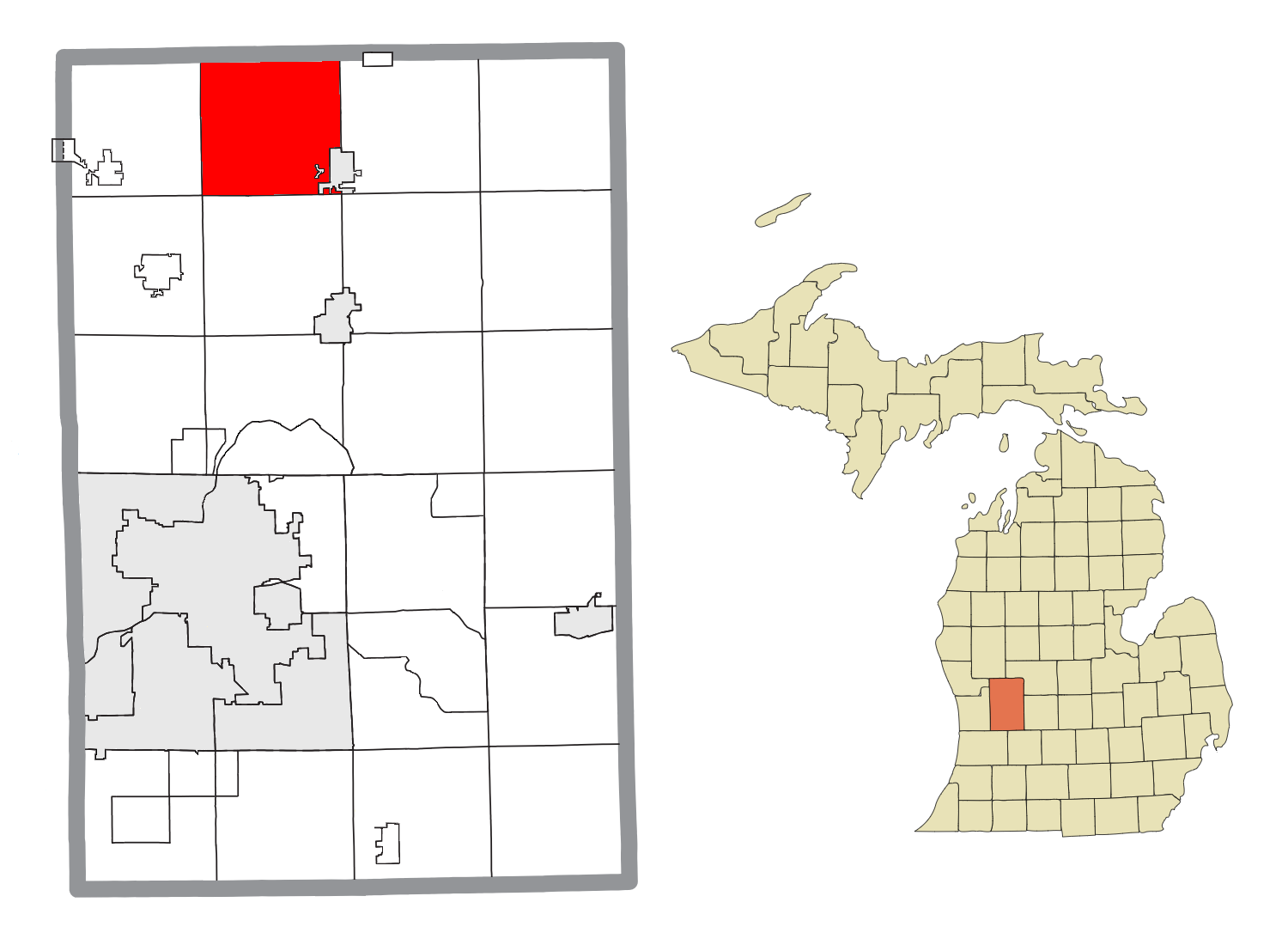
- Location within Kent County

- Location within the state of Michigan Location within the United States
- Coordinates: 43°14′37″N 85°36′44″W
- Country: United States
- State: Michigan
- County: Kent
- Established: 1857

Government
  - Supervisor: Robert Ellick
  - Clerk: Dorothy Willoughby

Area
  - Total: 36.28 sq mi (93.96 km^{2})
  - Land: 34.72 sq mi (89.92 km^{2})
  - Water: 1.56 sq mi (4.04 km^{2})
- Elevation: 856 ft (261 m)

Population (2020)
  - Total: 6,496
  - Density: 187.1/sq mi (72.24/km^{2})
- Time zone: UTC-5 (Eastern (EST))
  - Summer (DST): UTC-4 (EDT)
- ZIP code(s): 49319 (Cedar Springs); 49330 (Kent City); 49343 (Sand Lake); 49345 (Sparta)
- Area code: 616
- FIPS code: 26-081-74460
- GNIS feature ID: 1627088
- Website: Official website

Solon Township is a civil township of Kent County in the U.S. state of Michigan. The population was 6,496 at the 2020 census, a notable increase from 5,974 at the 2010 census.

It is part of the Grand Rapids metropolitan area and is located about 15 miles (24 km) north of the city of Grand Rapids.

== Geography ==
According to the U.S. Census Bureau, the township has a total area of 36.28 square miles (93.96 km^{2}), of which 34.72 square miles (89.92 km^{2}) is land and 1.56 square miles (4.04 km^{2}) (4.30%) is water.

=== Major highways ===
- US 131 runs north briefly through the southeast corner of the township.
- M-46 runs west–east through the southern portion of the township before running concurrent with U.S. Route 131.

== Demographics ==
As of the census of 2000, there were 4,662 people, 1,682 households, and 1,310 families residing in the township. The population density was 130.1 inhabitants per square mile (50.2/km^{2}). There were 1,778 housing units at an average density of 49.6 units per square mile (19.2 units/km^{2}). The racial makeup of the township was 96.31% White, 0.26% African American, 1.16% Native American, 0.28% Asian, 0.60% from other races, and 1.39% from two or more races. Hispanic or Latino of any race were 1.74% of the population.

There were 1,682 households, out of which 38.5% had children under the age of 18 living with them, 65.4% were married couples living together, 8.0% had a female householder with no husband present, and 22.1% were non-families. 18.5% of all households were made up of individuals, and 6.3% had someone living alone who was 65 years of age or older. The average household size was 2.77 and the average family size was 3.14.

In the township the population was spread out, with 28.8% under the age of 18, 7.6% from 18 to 24, 31.5% from 25 to 44, 22.3% from 45 to 64, and 9.8% who were 65 years of age or older. The median age was 35 years. For every 100 females, there were 101.8 males. For every 100 females age 18 and over, there were 102.5 males.

The median income for a household in the township was $44,814, and the median income for a family was $50,439. Males had a median income of $36,736 versus $27,451 for females. The per capita income for the township was $17,540. About 2.5% of families and 5.1% of the population were below the poverty line, including 4.6% of those under age 18 and 2.2% of those age 65 or over.

== Education ==
Solon Township is served by four separate school districts. The majority of the township is served by Cedar Springs Public Schools. Portions of the western side of the township are served by Kent City Community Schools. A very small portion of the northeast corner of the township is served by Tri County Area Schools, and another very small portion of the northwest portion of the township is served by Grant Public School District to the north in Newaygo County.

== 2019 shooting ==
On February 18, 2019, the area gained national attention when 28-year-old Aubrianne Moore, armed with a bolt-action hunting rifle, took her three daughters, 2-year-old Alaina Rau, 6-year-old Casisdy Rodery, and 8-year-old Kyrie Rodery, into the woodlands behind her grandparents home, and shot and killed them. She then drove to her boyfriend’s property, where she then committed suicide.

A possible motive was found from mental delusions Aubrianne suffered from due to schizophrenia. Police believed she was paranoid and thought her daughters were in danger, which led to the murders. Before the murders, Moore had taken her children out of school with a fake doctor’s note and took them to lunch. Child protective services and the Michigan Department of health were criticized due to the mental health problems Moore had, despite warnings from a social worker had of Moore harming others.

== Notable people ==
Mary Welch, 10-month old infant murdered by her parents
