= Brad Slaight =

American Comedian

Brad Slaight (born March 31, 1954), is an American comedian and television actor best known for starring in The Young and the Restless. Some of his other credits include roles on Parks and Recreation, That's Funny, Love Chronicles, Second Cousin, Once Removed, Unsolved Mysteries (as psychic George Anderson), Freshman Dorm, Haywire and Hellbent.

Slaight grew up in Cedar Springs, Michigan. He graduated from Central Michigan University with a teaching degree and taught speech, drama, and English at Brandywine High School in Niles, Michigan for two years before moving out to Los Angeles to pursue a career in show business.

After arriving in California, Brad soon became a performer in local comedy clubs The Comedy Store, The Improv, L.A. Cabaret, and Ice House as a standup and group performer.

In 2014, Brad's play Copies was adapted at the American Conservatory Theater and starred a young Marcus Orelias as one of the leading characters.
