= Cedar Springs, Michigan =

- City
- City of Cedar Springs
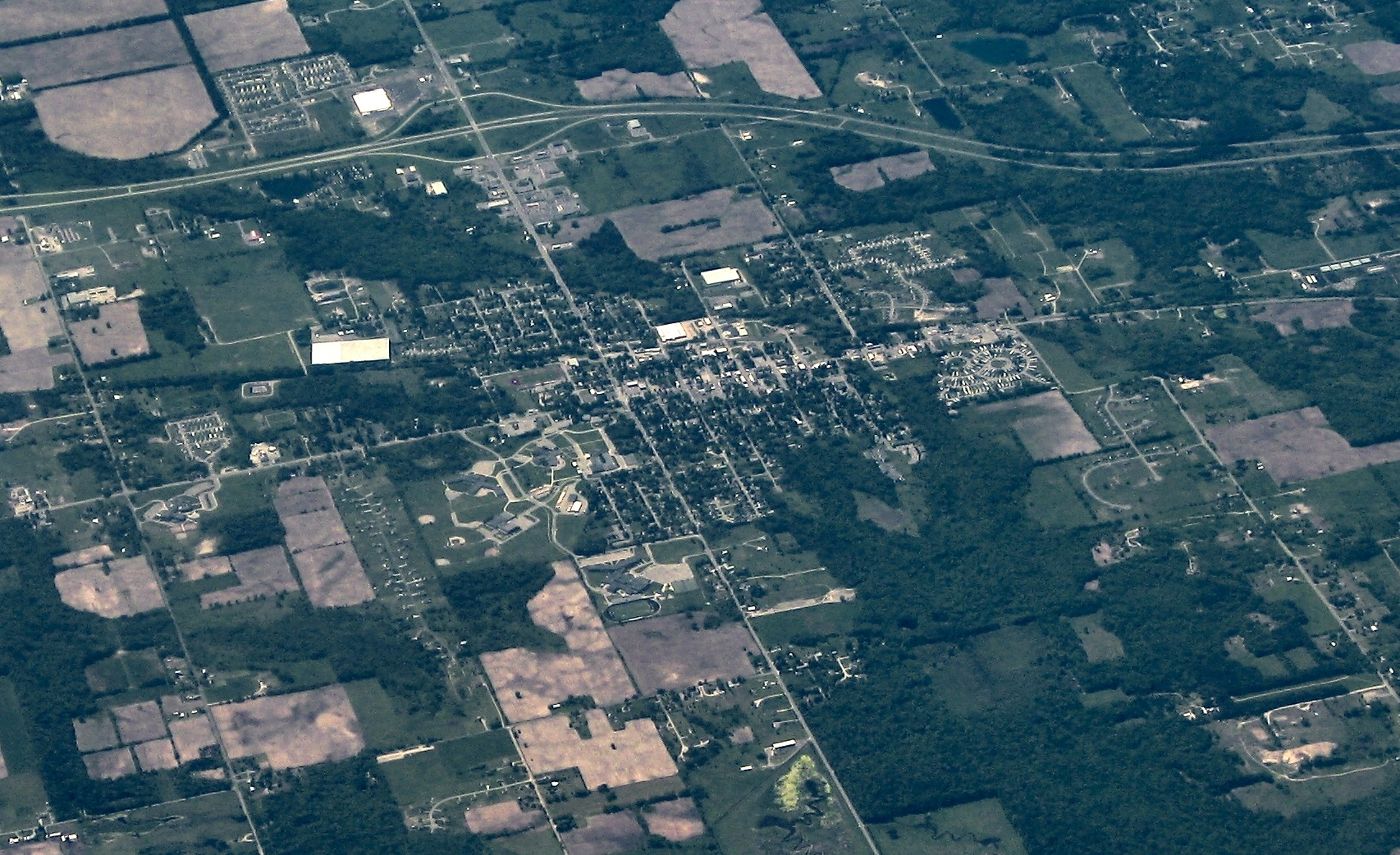
- Aerial photograph of Cedar Springs in 2009
- Nickname: The Red Flannel Town
- Motto: Cherishing our Heritage. Embracing our Future
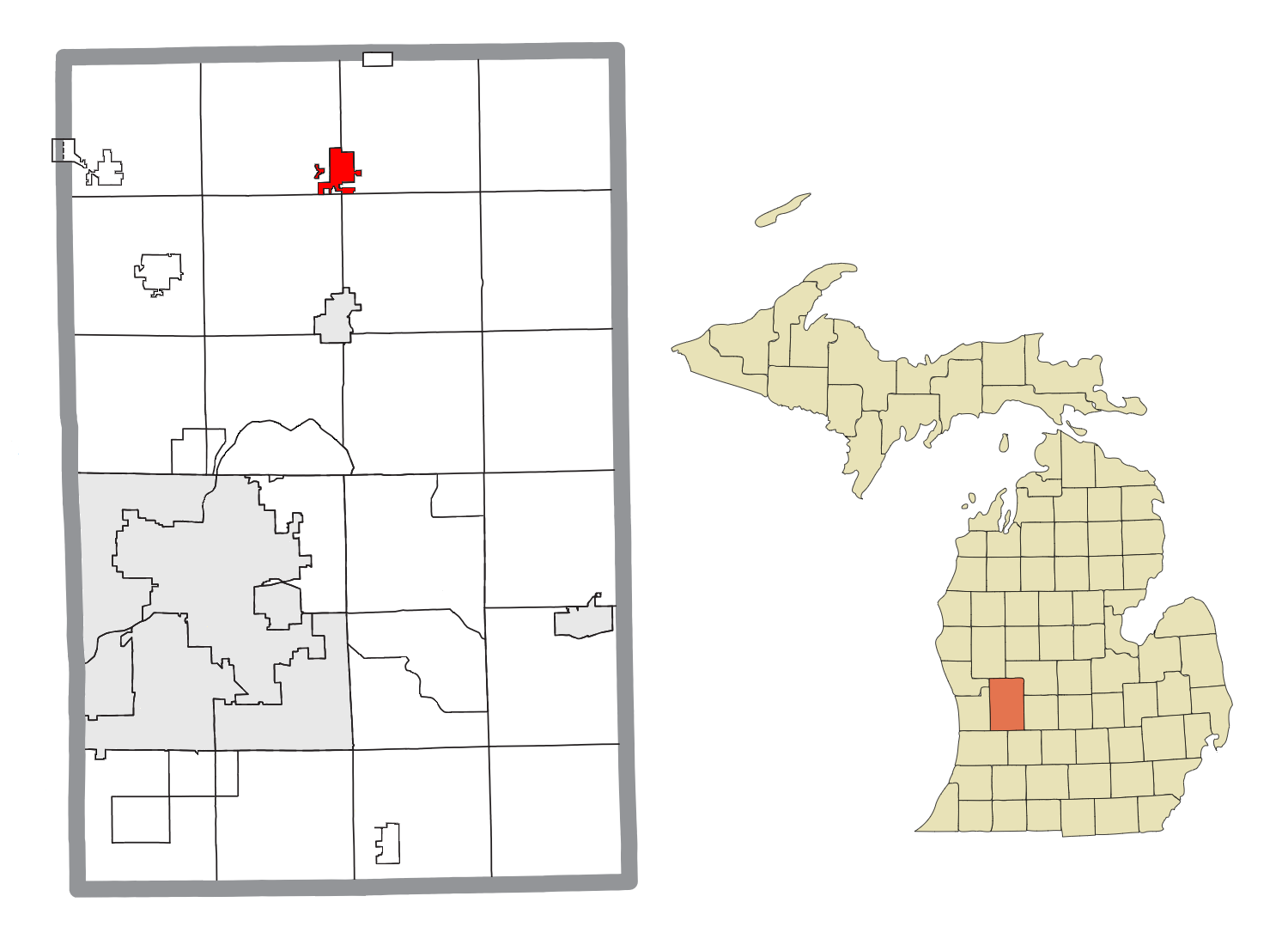
- Location within Kent County

- Location within the state of Michigan Location within the United States
- Coordinates: 43°13′13″N 85°33′13″W
- Country: United States
- State: Michigan
- County: Kent
- Established: 1857
- Incorporated: 1871 (village); 1959 (city)

Government
  - Type: Mayor–council
  - Mayor: Lisa Atchison
  - Clerk: April Decess
  - Manager: Darla Falcon
  - Assistant City Manager: Rebecca Johnson

Area
  - Total: 2.03 sq mi (5.25 km^{2})
  - Land: 1.96 sq mi (5.08 km^{2})
  - Water: 0.066 sq mi (0.17 km^{2})
- Elevation: 860 ft (260 m)

Population (2020)
  - Total: 3,627
  - Density: 1,850.5/sq mi (714.48/km^{2})
- Time zone: UTC-5 (Eastern (EST))
  - Summer (DST): UTC-4 (EDT)
- ZIP code(s): 49319
- Area code: 616
- FIPS code: 26-14200
- GNIS feature ID: 1626049
- Website: Official website

Cedar Springs is a city in Kent County in the U.S. state of Michigan. The population was 3,627 at the 2020 census. Cedar Springs is a northern city of the Grand Rapids metropolitan area and is about 20 miles (32.2 km) north of Grand Rapids.

== History ==
=== Founding and early settlement ===
The area that became Cedar Springs, named for the abundance of cedar trees and natural springs found throughout the vicinity, was settled in the mid-1850s, with early accounts noting pioneers such as Nicholas R. "N. R." Hill and Benjamin Fairchild arriving around 1855. On February 4, 1857, the community's first post office was established, with Hill serving as its inaugural postmaster, a position he held into the 1880s. In addition to establishing local postal service, Hill served in local civic capacities, including School Inspector and Justice of the Peace, and later represented the area in the Michigan Legislature.

Platted beginning in 1859, the settlement straddled the boundary between Nelson Township to the east and Solon Township to the west. Hill owned and platted the eastern portion in Nelson Township, while co-founder Benjamin Fairchild, referred to in early Kent County histories as the "other father" of Cedar Springs, owned and platted the western side in Solon Township. Together, Hill and Fairchild drained the surrounding cedar swamp and offered alternate village lots free of charge to newcomers willing to build on them, helping transform the remote outpost into a lumber and shingle-milling center.

=== Railroad development and village incorporation ===
Growth accelerated in 1868 when the Grand Rapids and Indiana Railroad constructed a railway line through the community. Fairchild also actively promoted competing rail connections, serving as a director for the Muskegon and Greenville Railroad in 1870, an effort that early county historians noted ultimately cost him his personal fortune.

In March 1871, the Michigan Legislature officially incorporated Cedar Springs as a village. The village's first charter election was held at Fairchild's residence on April 2, 1871, where voters elected him as Cedar Springs' first village president.

=== 20th century and Red Flannel heritage ===
During its timber era, local merchants supplied red flannel undergarments to lumberjacks working through Michigan winters. In 1936, amid the Great Depression, a New York newspaper writer remarked that red flannel underwear was no longer available in the United States; editors Grace Hamilton and Nina Babcock of the local Cedar Springs Clipper responded in print that town merchant Jack Pollock had plenty of red flannels in stock. Picked up by the Associated Press, the story sparked a wave of mail orders from across the country and abroad; ultimately bringing tens of thousands of orders to local merchants and helping sustain the village's economy through the final years of the Depression. To celebrate the publicity and resulting economic boost, residents held the first annual Red Flannel Day on November 11, 1939, cementing Cedar Springs' nickname as "The Red Flannel Town". The Red Flannel Festival is held on the first Saturday of October to this very day.

In October 1959, Cedar Springs incorporated as a city, driven largely by the need to establish independent water distribution and sanitary sewer systems rather than remaining divided between the taxing jurisdictions of Nelson and Solon townships.

== Geography ==
According to the U.S. Census Bureau, the city has a total area of 2.02 square miles (5.23 km^{2}), of which 1.95 square miles (5.05 km^{2}) is land and 0.07 square miles (0.18 km^{2}) (3.47%) is water.

== Transportation ==
=== Bus ===
- Indian Trails provides daily intercity bus service between Grand Rapids and Petoskey.

=== Major highways ===
- US 131 forms a portion of the western boundary of the city.
- M-46 turns north and runs concurrently with U.S. Route 131.

== Demographics ==
Historical population
Census	Pop.	Note	%±
1880	1,141		—
1890	1,035		−9.3%
1900	950		−8.2%
1910	947		−0.3%
1920	1,020		7.7%
1930	1,104		8.2%
1940	1,101		−0.3%
1950	1,378		25.2%
1960	1,768		28.3%
1970	1,807		2.2%
1980	2,615		44.7%
1990	2,600		−0.6%
2000	3,112		19.7%
2010	3,509		12.8%
2020	3,627		3.4%
U.S. Decennial Census

=== 2020 census ===
As of the 2020 census, Cedar Springs had a population of 3,627. The median age was 32.3 years. 28.3% of residents were under the age of 18 and 12.3% of residents were 65 years of age or older. For every 100 females there were 94.1 males, and for every 100 females age 18 and over there were 87.1 males age 18 and over.

0.0% of residents lived in urban areas, while 100.0% lived in rural areas.

There were 1,303 households in Cedar Springs, of which 39.9% had children under the age of 18 living in them. Of all households, 41.7% were married-couple households, 16.7% were households with a male householder and no spouse or partner present, and 30.0% were households with a female householder and no spouse or partner present. About 22.9% of all households were made up of individuals and 7.9% had someone living alone who was 65 years of age or older.

There were 1,358 housing units, of which 4.1% were vacant. The homeowner vacancy rate was 0.8% and the rental vacancy rate was 2.8%.

Racial composition as of the 2020 census
Race	Number	Percent
White	3,139	86.5%
Black or African American	63	1.7%
American Indian and Alaska Native	15	0.4%
Asian	27	0.7%
Native Hawaiian and Other Pacific Islander	5	0.1%
Some other race	63	1.7%
Two or more races	315	8.7%
Hispanic or Latino (of any race)	208	5.7%

=== 2010 census ===
As of the census of 2010, there were 3,509 people, 1,215 households, and 887 families living in the city. The population density was 1,728.6 inhabitants per square mile (667.4/km^{2}). There were 1,307 housing units at an average density of 643.8 per square mile (248.6/km^{2}). The racial makeup of the city was 94.3% White, 0.8% African American, 0.6% Native American, 0.4% Asian, 0.9% from other races, and 3.0% from two or more races. Hispanic or Latino of any race were 4.2% of the population.

There were 1,215 households, of which 47.3% had children under the age of 18 living with them, 43.6% were married couples living together, 21.6% had a female householder with no husband present, 7.8% had a male householder with no wife present, and 27.0% were non-families. 22.2% of all households were made up of individuals, and 7% had someone living alone who was 65 years of age or older. The average household size was 2.81 and the average family size was 3.23.

The median age in the city was 29.6 years. 32.9% of residents were under the age of 18; 9.8% were between the ages of 18 and 24; 28.2% were from 25 to 44; 19.2% were from 45 to 64; and 9.9% were 65 years of age or older. The gender makeup of the city was 47.1% male and 52.9% female.

=== 2000 census ===
As of the census of 2000, there were 3,112 people, 1,115 households, and 774 families living in the city. The population density was 1,701.9 inhabitants per square mile (657.1/km^{2}). There were 1,175 housing units at an average density of 642.6 per square mile (248.1/km^{2}). The racial makeup of the city was 95.85% White, 0.29% African American, 0.74% Native American, 0.45% Asian, 1.19% from other races, and 1.48% from two or more races. Hispanic or Latino of any race were 3.82% of the population. The ancestries of the city are 24% German, 14.2% American, 13.7% Dutch, 9.8% Irish, 9.5% English, and 7.4% Polish.

There were 1,115 households, out of which 40.1% had children under the age of 18 living with them, 46.3% were married couples living together, 17.9% had a female householder with no husband present, and 30.5% were non-families. 24.2% of all households were made up of individuals, and 7.3% had someone living alone who was 65 years of age or older. The average household size was 2.71 and the average family size was 3.17.

In the city, the population was spread out, with 31.3% under the age of 18, 11.6% from 18 to 24, 31.0% from 25 to 44, 15.8% from 45 to 64, and 10.3% who were 65 years of age or older. The median age was 29.6 years (below state average). For every 100 females, there are 89.2 males. For every 100 females age 18 and over, there were 87.5 males.

The median income for a household in the city was $39,542, and the median income for a family was $42,250. Males had a median income of $37,708 versus $23,056 for females. The per capita income for the city was $16,040. About 12.4% of families and 13.8% of the population were below the poverty line, including 18.4% of those under age 18 and 7.5% of those age 65 or over.

== Education ==
The school district is Cedar Springs Public Schools.

== Notable people ==
- Bert Carr, college football player with U of M; practiced medicine in Cedar Springs
- Mike Huckleberry, Michigan House of Representatives from the 70th district; born in Cedar Springs
- Charles Kelly, historian; Born in Cedar Springs
- Andre Metzger, World medalist in freestyle wrestling, member of National Wrestling Hall of Fame; raised in Cedar Springs
- Brad Slaight, actor, writer, comedian, Hollywood celebrity; born in Cedar Springs
