= Hendrik Meijer (disambiguation) =

Hendrik Meijer may refer to:

- Hendrik Meijer (1883–1964), Dutch-American businessman who founded US supermarket chain, Meijer
- Henk Meijer (born 1959), Dutch taekwondo coach and former competitor
- Hendrik de Meijer (1744-1793), painter from the Northern Netherlands
- Hank Meijer (born 1952), co-chairman and CEO, Meijer, grandson of Hendrik
