= Samsung Galaxy Card =

Credit card developed by Samsung Electronics

- Location: United States
- Launched: July 20, 2026; 5 days ago
- Technology: Credit card; Contactless payment; Samsung Pay
- Operator: Samsung Electronics (developer)
- Website: news.samsung.com/us/samsung-introducing-galaxy-card/

The Samsung Galaxy Card is a credit card created by Samsung Electronics, part of the Samsung Galaxy series. It was announced on July 20, 2026.

== History ==
The Samsung Galaxy Card was announced via a press release on Samsung Newsroom's website on July 20, 2026. The card is based on Barclays US Consumer Bank via the Visa network, and is available as a virtual or physical card with a black Samsung logo and offers 5% cash when preordering a Samsung Galaxy device.

== See also ==
- Apple Card
