= Jonathan R. White =

American counterterrorism expert

Johnathan Randall White
- Other name: Jon White
- Awards: Outstanding Service Recognition Award

Academic background
- Education: Michigan State University
- Thesis: "A Triumph of Bureaucracy: The Boston Police Strike and the Ideological Origins of the American Police Structure" (1982)

Academic work
- Discipline: Criminal Justice
- Sub-discipline: Terrorism studies
- Institutions: Grand Valley State University

Jonathan R. White is professor of honors, emeritus, in the Frederik Meijer Honors College of Grand Valley State University.

== Background ==
In 1982, White completed his PhD in criminal justice at Michigan State University. He served on a SWAT Team in Jackson, Mississippi during the 1970s. He was ordained as a minister in 1992.

== Career ==
In 1983, White took a faculty job at Grand Valley State University, teaching criminal justice and in liberal studies and the Honors College. Over 36 years at GVSU, he worked as dean of social sciences, founded the criminal justice program, and served as executive director of the homeland security initiative.

From 2001 to 2005, he worked for the Department of Justice. He served as director of the U.S. Bureau of Justice Assistance's State and Local Anti-Terrorism Training (SLATT) program, receiving a Special Recognition from the Federal Bureau of Investigation and the Outstanding Service Recognition Award from the U.S. Department of Justice. He conducted counterterrorism training for law enforcement and military forces in Europe, Central Asia, the Middle East and throughout the United States.

== Publications ==
White has written nine books on terrorism. "Terrorism and Homeland Security," ISBN 978-0357633847 a widely adopted textbook from Cengage, has run to ten editions.

== Controversy ==
In August 2024, Florida politician Randy Fine accused Florida International University of antisemitism because it used White's textbook.
