= Peter Meijer =

American politician (born 1988)

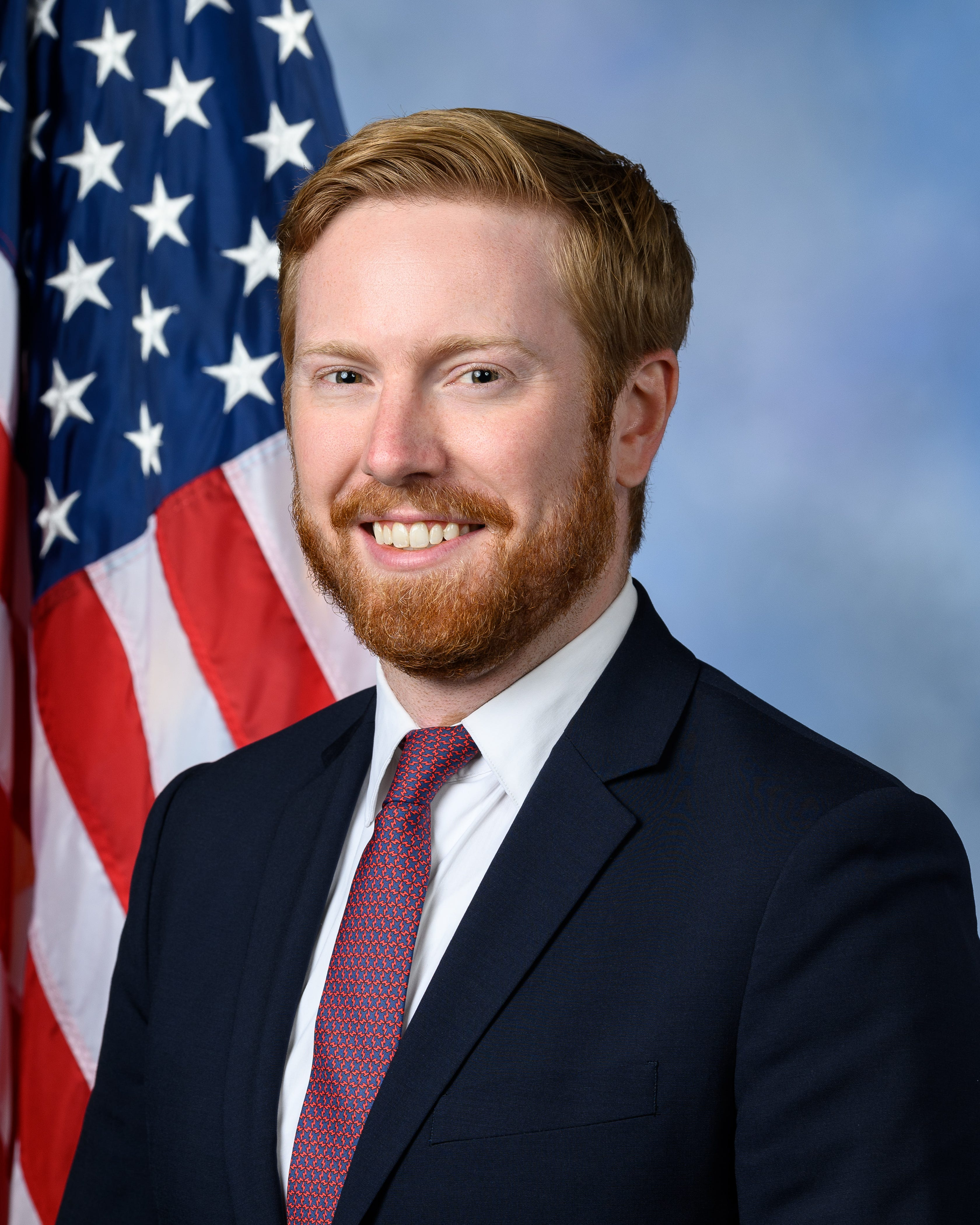
- Official portrait, 2020

Member of the U.S. House of Representatives from Michigan's 3rd district
- In office January 3, 2021 – January 3, 2023
- Preceded by: Justin Amash
- Succeeded by: Hillary Scholten

Personal details
- Born: Peter James Meijer; January 10, 1988 (age 38) Grand Rapids, Michigan, U.S.
- Party: Republican
- Spouse: Gabriella Zacarias (m. 2016)
- Children: 1
- Relatives: Hank Meijer (father); Doug Meijer (uncle); Frederik Meijer (grandfather); Hendrik Meijer (great-grandfather)
- Education: United States Military Academy; Columbia University (BA); New York University (MBA)

Military service
- Branch/service: United States Army
- Years of service: 2008–2016
- Rank: Sergeant
- Unit: 325th Military Intelligence Battalion
- Battles/wars: Iraq War

Peter James Meijer (/ˈmaɪ.ər/, MY-ər; born January 10, 1988) is an American politician and business analyst who served as the U.S. representative from Michigan's 3rd congressional district from 2021 until 2023. He is a member of the Republican Party.

Meijer is a member of the Meijer family, the owners of the Meijer superstore chain. He holds a bachelor's degree from Columbia University and a master's degree in business administration from New York University. Meijer served in the United States Army Reserve and was deployed to Iraq as an intelligence advisor during the Iraq War.

In 2020, Meijer was elected to the U.S. House of Representatives from Michigan's 3rd congressional district. He was one of 10 House Republicans who voted to impeach Donald Trump during Trump's second impeachment. Meijer sought re-election in 2022, but lost the Republican primary to former Trump administration official John Gibbs; Gibbs lost the general election to Democrat Hillary Scholten. He was later a candidate in the 2024 United States Senate election in Michigan, though he suspended his campaign in April 2024, before the primary.

== Early life and education ==
Meijer was born in Grand Rapids, Michigan. He is the oldest son of Hank Meijer and the grandson of Frederik Meijer, whose father, Hendrik Meijer, founded the Meijer supermarket chain after emigrating from the Netherlands to the United States. The Meijer family owns the Meijer superstore chain. Forbes has recognized the Meijer family as one of the wealthiest in Michigan, with a net worth above $6 billion. His financial disclosures list more than $50 million in assets, primarily from a Meijer family trust.

During Meijer's childhood, his parents legally changed the spelling of his surname to 'Meyer', in an effort to shield him from any favoritism or criticism in his school years for being a member of the prominent Meijer family. He legally readopted the family name at age eighteen.

Meijer graduated from East Grand Rapids High School in 2006. He initially studied for one year at the United States Military Academy at West Point before transferring to Columbia University in 2008, graduating with a bachelor's degree in cultural anthropology in 2012. At Columbia, he was an advocate for reinstating the Reserve Officers' Training Corps on campus. He was also a volunteer emergency medical technician for Columbia University's emergency medical services.

=== Iraq War ===
From 2008 to 2016, Meijer served in the United States Army Reserve and was deployed to Iraq from 2010 into 2011, serving as an intelligence advisor.

In 2017, Meijer graduated from the New York University Stern School of Business with a Master of Business Administration.

== Personal life ==
Meijer married Gabriella Zacarias in 2016. They have one child.

== Analyst career ==
From 2013 to 2015, Meijer worked as a conflict analyst for an international NGO. He was later employed by Olympia Development of Michigan of Ilitch Holdings as an analyst from April 2018 to January 2019. During this time, Meijer also worked on veterans projects such as Project Rubicon, was on the advisory board of the With Honor super political action committee, and assisted with urban renewal projects throughout Michigan.

== U.S. House of Representatives ==
=== Elections ===
==== 2020 ====
Following Justin Amash's departure from the Republican Party in July 2019, Meijer announced his candidacy for Michigan's 3rd congressional district, competing in the Republican primary. He voiced his support for President Donald Trump, saying he would work with Trump to "make sure that we advance policies and an agenda that is in the best interest of West Michigan." In his primary campaign, Meijer received funding from several wealthy Michigan-based business families and outraised the other Republican candidates.

The DeVos and Van Andel families, who co-founded Amway, contributed to Meijer's campaign, though United States Secretary of Education Betsy DeVos and her husband Dick DeVos abstained from fundraising efforts. Mark J. Bissell of Bissell home-care products and the late businessman Peter Secchia also donated to Meijer's campaign. Vice President Mike Pence, Representative Dan Crenshaw, House Minority Leader Kevin McCarthy, House Minority Whip Steve Scalise, and Senator Tom Cotton endorsed Meijer. Meijer defeated Lynn Afendoulis in the August 4 primary election. Meijer faced Democratic nominee Hillary Scholten in the general election. He raised $2.7 million during the campaign, to Scholten's $3 million. The 3rd has historically tilted Republican; the district and its predecessors had been in GOP hands for all but 35 months since 1913 (it was numbered as the 5th before 1993). Nevertheless, the race was very close; Cook Political Report rated it a toss-up.

Ultimately, Meijer defeated Scholten, 53%–47%. It was the closest race in the district since Harold S. Sawyer was held to 53% in what was then the 5th district in 1982, and only the second time since 1982 that a Democrat had managed 40% of the vote (Amash's Democratic opponent, Cathy Albro, had taken 43% two years earlier). He ran slightly ahead of Trump, who narrowly carried the district with 51% of the vote.

==== 2022 ====
Meijer ran for reelection in the district for the 2022 elections. His primary opponent was John Gibbs, a former Trump administration official. In the final days of the primary, the Democratic Congressional Campaign Committee, in a strategy that generated controversy, bought TV ads designed to raise Gibbs' profile, believing that Meijer would be the more difficult opponent in the general election. Meijer lost the August 2 primary to Gibbs. Meijer said he would not support Gibbs in the November election. In November 2022, Gibbs lost the general election to Meijer's 2020 opponent, Democrat Hillary Scholten.

=== Tenure ===
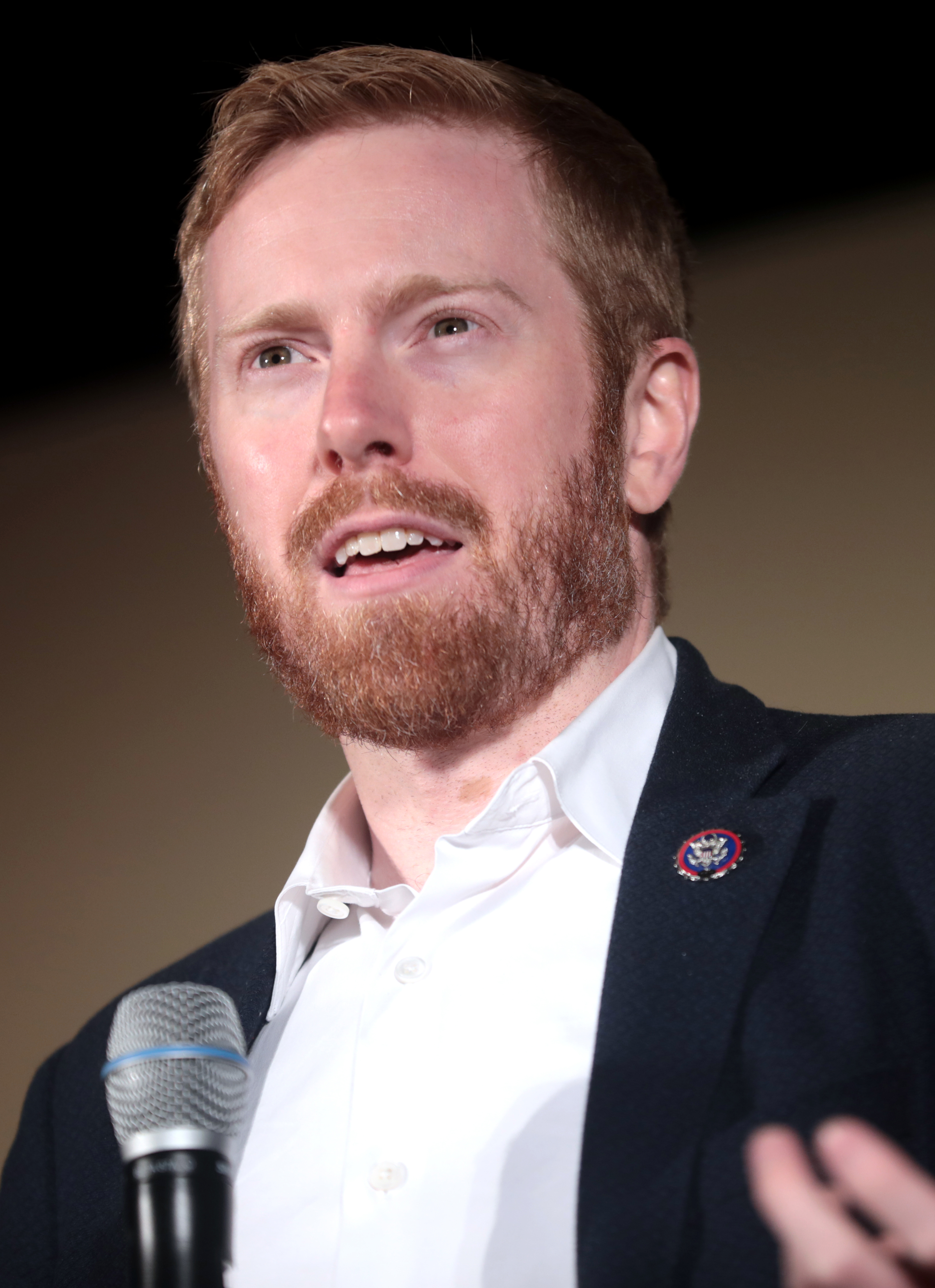
Meijer speaking at an event in June 2022

Meijer accepted the 2020 presidential election results, announcing publicly that he accepted the outcome and recognized Joe Biden as president-elect. After experiencing the 2021 United States Capitol attack, he called on Republicans to take responsibility for their lies about election fraud. On January 13, 2021, he and nine other Republicans voted to impeach Donald Trump. The next day, Meijer stated in an interview with MSNBC that he had purchased body armor and made changes to his daily schedule due to threats against his life in reaction to his vote for impeachment. On January 20, 2021, the day of Biden's inauguration, Meijer was one of 17 newly elected House Republicans to sign a letter congratulating him and expressing hope of working across the partisan divide.

On May 23, 2021, during the COVID-19 pandemic, Meijer condemned Representative Marjorie Taylor Greene's comparison between the Holocaust and the requirement that face masks be worn within the House chamber. He was the first Republican to condemn Greene's remarks. Meijer said that "such comparisons demean the Holocaust and contaminate American political speech."

On August 24, 2021, Meijer and Representative Seth Moulton flew unannounced into Hamid Karzai International Airport during the 2021 Taliban offensive amid the evacuation of Americans and allies. The Defense Department and then-House Speaker Nancy Pelosi were not given advance notice of their intent. The next day, Pelosi sent a letter to all House members saying that "the Departments of Defense and State have requested that Members not travel to Afghanistan and the region during this time of danger" because such travel "would unnecessarily divert needed resources" from the evacuation efforts.

==== Voting record ====
During the presidency of Joe Biden, Meijer voted in line with the president's stated position 36% of the time.

On May 19, 2021, Meijer became one of 35 Republicans who joined all Democrats in voting to establish the January 6 commission meant to investigate the 2021 United States Capitol attack.

On October 21, 2021, Meijer was one of nine House Republicans to vote to hold Steve Bannon in contempt of Congress for defying the subpoena he received issued by the House Select Committee investigating the January 6, 2021, insurrection.

==== Foreign and defense policy ====
In June 2021, Meijer was one of 49 House Republicans to vote to repeal the Authorization for Use of Military Force Against Iraq Resolution of 2002.

In July 2021, Meijer voted for the bipartisan ALLIES Act, which would increase by 8,000 the number of special immigrant visas for Afghan allies of the U.S. military during its invasion of Afghanistan, while also reducing some application requirements that caused long application backlogs; the bill passed the House, 407–16.

In September 2021, Meijer was among 135 House Republicans to vote for the National Defense Authorization Act of 2022, which contains a provision that would require women to register for the draft.

Meijer voted for H.R. 7691, the Additional Ukraine Supplemental Appropriations Act, 2022, which would provide the Ukrainian government with $40 billion in emergency aid.

==== Energy and environment ====
Meijer has acknowledged the existence of anthropogenic climate change. He believes Republicans should take on the problem with conservative solutions. "Not only embracing conservatism and the Republican party's long history of conservation and environmental protection but extending that forward is frankly where the country is. I think that it is a political imperative and a moral imperative as well", he said.

On March 21, 2021, Meijer signed a letter pressing Biden to stop Enbridge Line 5, an oil pipeline, from being shut down in May. Congressional members' concerns about the pipeline's closure intensified after Biden revoked the Keystone XL Pipeline permit.

Meijer was one of eight House Republicans to vote for the Colorado Wilderness Act. The bill would designate 600,000 acres of public lands in the State of Colorado as components of the National Wilderness Preservation System.

in May 2022, Meijer was one of 16 House Republicans to vote for the Recovering America's Wildlife Act. The bill would provide states, territories, and tribes with $1.39 billion annually to catalyze efforts to restore habitats and implement conservation strategies, as described in each state's Wildlife Action Plan.

==== LGBT rights ====
In 2021, Meijer co-sponsored the Fairness for All Act, the Republican alternative to the Equality Act. The bill would prohibit discrimination on the basis of sex, sexual orientation, and gender identity, and protect the free exercise of religion.

In 2021, Meijer was one of 29 Republicans to vote to reauthorize the Violence Against Women Act. This bill expanded legal protections for transgender people, and contained provisions allowing transgender women to use women's shelters and serve time in prisons matching their gender identity.

Meijer was one of 31 Republicans to vote for the LGBTQ Business Equal Credit Enforcement and Investment Act.

In 2022, Meijer was one of six Republicans to vote for the Global Respect Act, which imposes sanctions on foreign persons responsible for violations of the internationally recognized human rights of lesbian, gay, bisexual, transgender, queer, and intersex (LGBTQI) people, and for other purposes.

On July 19, 2022, Meijer and 46 other Republican representatives voted for the Respect for Marriage Act, which would codify the right to same-sex marriage in federal law.

==== Immigration ====
Meijer was a co-sponsor of the America's CHILDREN Act. The bill would prevent the children of long-term visa holders who came to the U.S. legally with their parents from having their visas expire the day they turn 21. If they had maintained legal status in the U.S. for ten years and graduated from an institution of higher education, they were eligible to apply for permanent residency.

==== Gun policy ====
In 2022, Meijer was one of 14 House Republicans to support a bipartisan agreement on gun control, which included a red flag provision, support for state crisis intervention orders, funding for school safety resources, stronger background checks for buyers under 21, and penalties for straw purchases. On July 29, 2022, Meijer joined a majority of his Republican colleagues and five Democrats in voting against H.R. 1808, a bill to ban assault weapons.

==== Antitrust legislation ====
In 2022, Meijer was one of 39 Republicans to vote for the Merger Filing Fee Modernization Act of 2022, an antitrust package that would crack down on corporations for anti-competitive behavior.

==== Abortion ====
Meijer opposes abortion. He has consistently voted against bills to expand abortion access and has an A+ rating from the Susan B. Anthony list.

=== Committee assignments ===
- Committee on Homeland Security
  - Subcommittee on Intelligence and Counterterrorism
  - Subcommittee on Oversight, Management, & Accountability (Ranking Member)
- Committee on Foreign Affairs
  - Subcommittee on Europe, Energy, the Environment and Cyber
- Committee on Science, Space, and Technology
  - Subcommittee on Energy
  - Subcommittee on Space and Aeronautics

=== Caucus memberships ===
- Republican Governance Group
- Problem Solvers Caucus
- Republican Main Street Partnership

== U.S. Senate campaign ==
In November 2023, Meijer announced his candidacy for the U.S. Senate in 2024. The seat became open when incumbent Democratic senator Debbie Stabenow chose to retire rather than seek a fifth term earlier that year. A source close to Meijer reported that the NRSC had previously urged Meijer not to join the race in fear of splitting the primary vote between himself and Mike Rogers, the party's preferred choice, thus handing the nomination to James Craig. Although he had gained a reputation for being an outspoken critic of Donald Trump following the January 6 United States Capitol attack, Meijer stated in an interview shortly after launching his Senate bid that he would support Trump if he became the Republican Party nominee in the 2024 presidential election, viewing President Joe Biden as more of a threat than another Trump term. Meijer withdrew from the Senate race on April 26, 2024, stating that continuing his campaign would create more divisiveness that would "distract from the essential goal" of Republicans winning in Michigan.

== Electoral history ==
=== 2020 ===
2020 Michigan's 3rd congressional district Republican primary
Party	Candidate	Votes	%
Republican	Peter Meijer	47,273	50.19
Republican	Lynn Afendoulis	24,579	26.09
Republican	Thomas J. Norton	14,913	15.83
Republican	Joe Farrington	3,966	4.21
Republican	Emily Rafi	3,462	3.68
Total votes		94,193	100.00

2020 Michigan's 3rd congressional district election
Party	Candidate	Votes	%	±%
Republican	Peter Meijer	213,649	52.96%	−1.46
Democratic	Hillary Scholten	189,769	47.04%	+3.86
Total votes		403,418	100.0%	
Republican gain from Libertarian				

=== 2022 ===
2022 Michigan's 3rd congressional district Republican primary
Party	Candidate	Votes	%
Republican	John Gibbs	54,136	51.77
Republican	Peter Meijer (incumbent)	50,440	48.23
Total votes		104,576	100.00

U.S. House of Representatives
Preceded by Justin Amash	Member of the U.S. House of Representatives from Michigan's 3rd congressional district 2021–2023	Succeeded by Hillary Scholten
U.S. order of precedence (ceremonial)
Preceded by Kerry Bentivolio as Former U.S. Representative	Order of precedence of the United States as Former U.S. Representative	Succeeded by Tim Mahoney as Former U.S. Representative
