= Just Checking =

Just Checking may refer to

- Cheerios § Just Checking, a Cheerios commercial
- Just Checking Limited, a home activity monitoring services company
- Just Checking: Scenes From the Life of an Obsessive-Compulsive, a book by Emily Colas
