= MCX =

MCX may refer to:

- Manila Commodity Exchange, a commodity and derivatives exchange based in Makati, Philippines
- Multi Commodity Exchange, an independent commodity exchange based in India.
- Merchant Customer Exchange, a joint venture with the desired purpose of offering a new platform for smartphone-based transactions
- MCX connector, a coaxial RF connector
- Muntinlupa–Cavite Expressway, an expressway between Muntinlupa and Cavite
- 1110, in Roman numerals
- SIG Sauer MCX, a carbine series designed and manufactured by SIG Sauer
