= Liesel =

The name Liesel is short for Elizabeth. The name was most popular during the 17th century.

Liesel can also refer to:

- Liesel Meminger, a character in The Book Thief
- Liesel Matthews (born Liesel Pritzker), an American heiress and actress.
- Liesel Westermann, a German athlete who competed mainly in the discus throw.
- Liesel Litzenburger, a writer from Michigan.
- Liesel Holler, the 2004 Miss Peru (for Miss Earth 2004).
- Liesel Moak Skorpen, a children's author.
- Liesel Mueller, a character from the Scholomance series of novels by Naomi Novik.
