= Hank Meijer =

American billionaire businessman

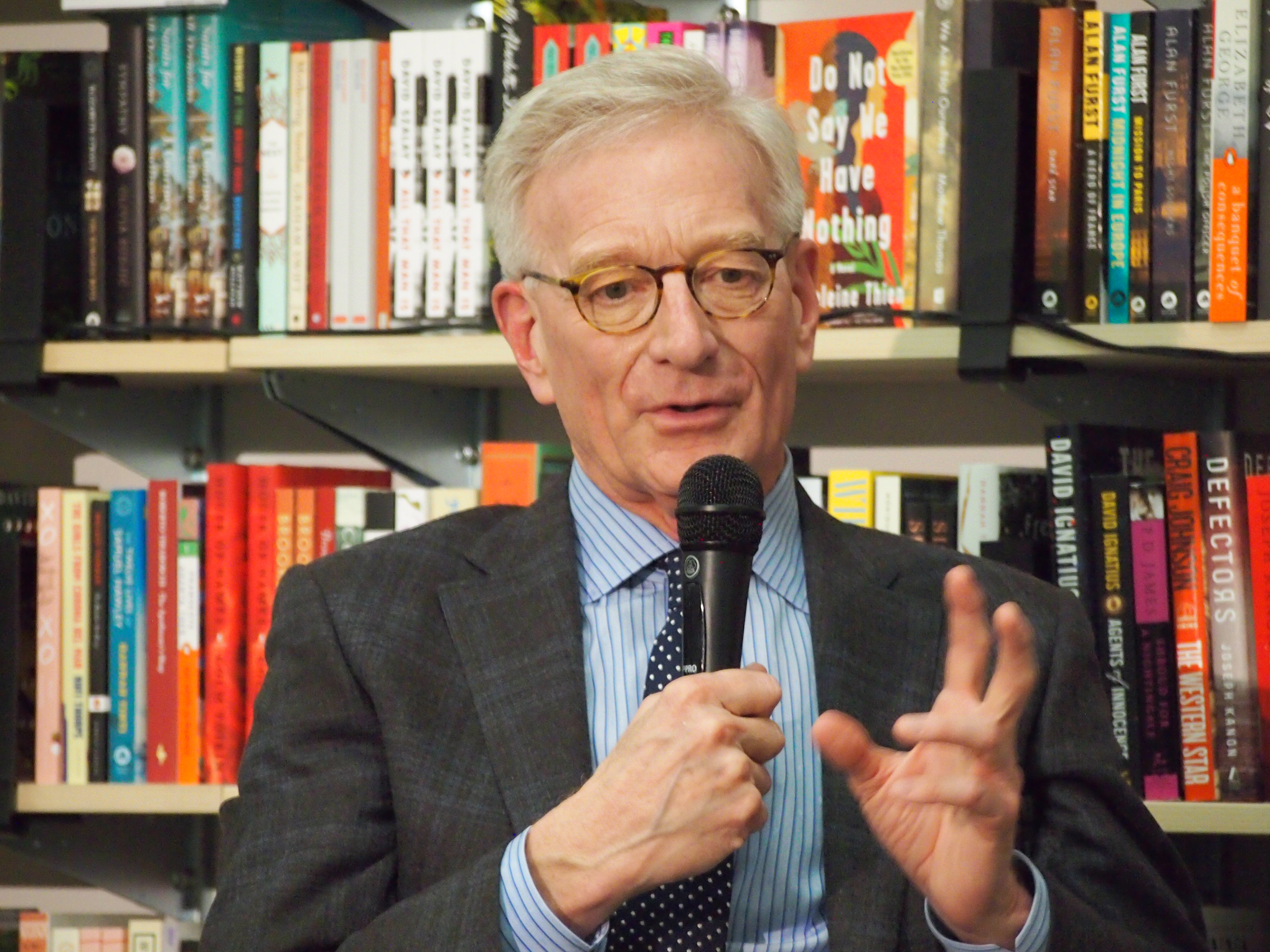
- Born: 1952 (age 73–74)
- Education: Creston High School
- Alma mater: University of Michigan
- Occupations: Co-chairman and CEO, Meijer
- Political party: Republican
- Spouse: Liesel Litzenburger
- Children: 3, including Peter Meijer
- Parent(s): Frederik Meijer; Lena Rader
- Relatives: Doug Meijer (brother)

Hendrik G. "Hank" Meijer (born 1952) is an American billionaire businessman, co-chairman and CEO of the US supermarket chain Meijer.

== Early life ==
Hank Meijer is the son of Lena Rader and Frederik Meijer, and grandson of Hendrik Meijer, who founded the US supermarket chain Meijer in 1934. He was educated at Creston High School. In 1973, he graduated from the University of Michigan with a degree in literature.

== Career ==
From 1973 to 1979, Meijer was a journalist. In 1979, he joined Meijer, rising to co-chairman and CEO.

According to Forbes, Hank and Doug Meijer have a joint net worth of $7.8 billion, as of June 2015.

Meijer is on the board of directors at the Kettering Foundation, an American non-partisan research foundation founded in 1927 by Charles F. Kettering.

== Personal life ==
He has three children from his first marriage, and is now married to Liesel Litzenburger, a writer and novelist. He lives in Grand Rapids, Michigan.

He was a close friend of President and Mrs. Gerald R. Ford, and is vice-chairman and a trustee of the Gerald R. Ford Presidential Foundation.

In 2015, his daughter's British ex-husband was jailed for 12 years for attempting to blackmail the family.

His son, Peter Meijer, is a former Republican Party congressman for Michigan's 3rd congressional district.

== Works ==
- Arthur Vandenberg: The Man in the Middle of the American Century. University of Chicago Press. 2017. ISBN 978-0-226-43351-6.
