= Emily Colas =

American memoirist

Emily Colas is an American author. Her book Just Checking: Scenes From the Life of an Obsessive–Compulsive illustrates her struggle with obsessive–compulsive disorder (OCD), and the effects it had on her life and family.
