= Just Checking (book) =

1998 non-fiction book by Emily Colas

- Author: Emily Colas
- Genre: Autobiography
- Publisher: Pocket Books
- Publication date: 1998
- Pages: 165
- ISBN: 9780671024376

Just Checking: Scenes From the Life of an Obsessive–Compulsive is a 1998 book by Emily Colas which recounts her life with obsessive–compulsive disorder (OCD). Divided into four sections, Colas provides snapshots of her life in a journal like manner. The text conveys her emotions regarding the disease throughout her entire life including her childhood and her role as a mother herself.

== Synopsis ==
Just Checking: Scenes From the Life of an Obsessive–Compulsive was written by Emily Colas in 1998. Separated into four parts, Emily Colas provides snapshots of her daily life and the struggles that she faces as a result of obsessive–compulsive disorder. The anecdotes of her life are written in a journal-like manner. The entries cover all aspects of her life including her cheating college boyfriend, her family life and raising her two children, and her interaction with friends. Colas worries frantically, especially about contracting diseases from the common daily interactions with other humans. Colas's most evident worry is that she will instantaneously contract a disease from the most minuscule sample of blood. When strangers, including the babysitter of her children, enter her home she becomes obsessed with every possible chance that they may infect her home. Therefore, Colas develops a system of checkpoints so she could determine whether or not the bathroom was used, a drawer opened, or anything touched. As the book proceeds, she begins to deal with her illness and she struggles to get better. Her marriage falls apart as a result of her disorder; she and her husband ultimately divorce. Eventually, after Colas's married life disintegrates, she decided to take action and get help for her disorder. The narrative covers the stress that her condition placed on her family. Colas starts taking medication and makes a conscious effort to stop obsessing over unimportant matters. The last section of entries demonstrates a healthier and more controlled person.

== Reception ==
Liesel Litzenburger, in a review in the Detroit Free Press, complimented the humor of the book which she found "keeps us at what is, in such an unsafe little world, a safe enough distance."
