= Doug Meijer =

American billionaire businessman

- Born: 1955 (age 70–71)
- Education: University of Michigan
- Occupations: Co-chairman, Meijer
- Spouse: divorced
- Children: 1
- Parent: Frederik Meijer
- Relatives: Hank Meijer (brother); Peter Meijer (nephew)

Douglas Meijer (born 1955) is an American billionaire businessman who is the current co-chairman of the US supermarket chain Meijer. He, jointly with his brother, has a net worth of US$16.6 billion, as of January 2022.

== Early life ==
Meijer was born in 1955, the son of Frederik Meijer and Lena Meijer, and grandson of Hendrik and Gezina Meijer. His grandfather, Hendrik Meijer, founded the US supermarket chain Meijer in 1934. He has a degree from the University of Michigan.

== Career ==
According to Forbes, Meijer and his brother Hank have a joint net worth of US$16.6 billion, as of January 2022.

== Personal life ==
He lives in Grand Rapids, Michigan. In 2016, he discussed his ongoing struggle with depression that started in 2011, when his father died, he was diagnosed with cancer. He has been divorced twice. He has one daughter. His nephew, Peter Meijer, is a former Republican representative in Michigan.
