= Egyptian Banks Company =

The Egyptian Banks Company is a government-owned joint-stock company, affiliated with the Central Bank of Egypt. It was established in 1995 with a partnership and contribution from the Central Bank of Egypt and several banks operating in the Egyptian market. The company works in the field of the national payment orders switch, electronic clearing, electronic payments, and the design of information systems and software for electronic payments within Egypt. The company owns a network connecting 123 banks, the "Meeza" card brand, and the "InstaPay" application.
