= Apple Pay =

Mobile payment service by Apple

- Developer: Apple
- Release: October 20, 2014; 12 years ago
- Operating system: iOS 8.1 or later (iOS 10 or later for Apple Pay on the web) (iOS 11.2 or later for Apple Cash); All watchOS versions macOS Sierra or later All visionOS versions
- Platform: In store: iPhone 6 or newer Apple Watch paired with an iPhone, or Series 3 or newer with cellular; On the web (Safari): iPhone 6 or newer with iOS 10 or later 2014 iPads (Air 2, Mini 3) or newer with iOS 10 or later 2016 MacBook Pro with Touch ID or newer with macOS High Sierra or later 2018 MacBook Air or newer with macOS Catalina or later Macs based on Apple silicon paired with a Magic Keyboard with Touch ID Macs supporting Handoff running macOS Sierra or later paired with an Apple Watch or iPhone 6 or newer Apple Vision Pro; On the web [standalone] (3rd party browser using WebKit): iPhone 8 or newer with iOS 16 or later macOS Sequoia or later; On the web [external]: Any device capable of displaying an Apple Pay code
- License: Proprietary
- Website: apple.com/apple-pay

Apple Pay is a mobile payment service by Apple that allows users to make payments in person, in iOS apps, and on the web. Supported on iPhone, Apple Watch, iPad, Mac, and Vision Pro, Apple Pay digitizes and can replace a credit or debit card chip and PIN transaction at a contactless-capable point-of-sale terminal. It does not require Apple Pay–specific contactless payment terminals; it can work with any merchant that accepts contactless payments. It adds two-factor authentication via Touch ID, Face ID, Optic ID, PIN, or passcode. Devices wirelessly communicate with point of sale systems using near field communication (NFC), with an embedded secure element (eSE) to securely store payment data and perform cryptographic functions, and Apple's Touch ID, Face ID and OpticID for biometric authentication.

Apple Pay can also be used to pay fares on many public transport networks. Payment can be authorised without authentication for supported public transport networks, referred to as 'Express Mode', or by a regular authenticated Apple Pay transaction for other systems accepting contactless payments.

== Service ==
=== Device compatibility ===
The service is compatible with iPhone 6 and newer, iPad Air 2 and newer, Macs with Touch ID, and Apple Watch Series 1 and later. In iOS 17 or later, the number of cards able to be added to the service is determined by the capacity of the secure element, which varies by device.

=== Technology ===
Apple Pay acceptance mark

Apple Pay uses the EMV Payment Tokenization Specification.

The service keeps customer payment information private from the retailer by replacing the customer's credit or debit card Funding Primary Account Number (FPAN) with a tokenized Device Primary Account Number (DPAN), and creates a "dynamic security code [...] generated for each transaction". The 'dynamic security code' is the cryptogram in an EMV-mode transaction, and the Dynamic Card Verification Value (dCVV) in a magnetic stripe data emulation-mode transaction. Apple added that they would not track usage, which would stay between the customers, the vendors, and the banks. Users can also remotely halt the service on a lost phone via the Find My iPhone service.

To pay at points of sale, users hold their authenticated Apple device to the point of sale system's NFC card reader. iPhone users authenticate by using Touch ID, Face ID, or passcode, whereas Apple Watch users authenticate by double-clicking a button on an unlocked device. To pay in supported iOS apps, users choose Apple Pay as their payment method and authenticate with Touch ID or Face ID. Users can add payment cards to the service in any of four ways: through the payment card listed on their iTunes accounts, by taking a photo of the card, being provisioned from within the card issuer's app, or by entering the card information manually.

Although users receive immediate notification of the transaction, the Apple Pay system is not an instant payment instrument, because the fund transfer between counter-parties is not immediate. The settlement time depends on the payment method chosen by the customer. (An exception being payments made using a card which stores the user's balance on the card itself, such as a Japanese Suica card or a Hong Kong Octopus card. These cards can transfer funds directly to the merchant without the need for an online connection.)

In the United Kingdom, traditional contactless payments using bank cards are limited to £100 by issuing banks (previously £45 until October 14, 2021) as no cardholder authentication is provided as part of the transaction. Payments using Apple Pay, however, support payments of any amount owing to the increased security and lower risk of fraud in Apple Pay transactions (although some issuing banks may impose their own transaction limits, and not all contactless readers support this functionality – see CDCVM below). Similar transaction limits apply in other countries.

Apple assumes some liability for fraudulent use of the service. Banks are expected to carry the burden of the service, and Apple is said to have negotiated smaller transaction fees. In turn, the banks hoped to capture purchases that were formerly handled without credit. Financial Times reported that Apple receives 0.15% cut of US purchases made with the service, but, following the UK launch, reported that Apple's cut is much lower in the UK. This is largely because Regulation (EU) 2015/751 capped interchange fees in the European Economic Area at 0.3% for personal credit cards and 0.2% for personal debit cards with effect from June 8, 2015. In Russia, Apple receives 0.05% for debit cards and 0.12% for credit cards of each purchase, and in addition the bank pays 45 rubles a year for each card added in the service.

Apple ended its in-house "buy now, pay later" service in the US, shifting to third-party lenders for installment plans. Existing users can still manage payments via the Wallet app.

=== Consumer Device Cardholder Verification Method (CDCVM) ===
In EMV-mode transactions, Apple Pay supports the use of the Consumer Device Cardholder Verification Method (CDCVM) using Touch ID, Face ID, or the phone's or watch's passcode. The use of CDCVM allows for the device itself to provide verification for the transaction and may not require the cardholder to sign a receipt or enter their PIN. Additionally, in certain markets which have a 'no verification contactless limit' using contactless cards (such as the £100 limit in the United Kingdom, the C$100 limit in Canada and the 300SAR limit in Saudi Arabia), the use of CDCVM can enable merchants to accept transactions higher than these amounts using Apple Pay, providing their terminal software is updated to support the latest network contactless specifications.

=== Global acceptance ===
Major financial entities offer contactless payment systems. Due to provisioning differences between countries (and even between issuers), users may encounter acceptance issues when travelling to a different country. Some known examples include:

- Canada, UK, Saudi Arabia, and possibly other non-US-issued Visa cards only support EMV-mode transactions and not legacy magnetic-stripe data-emulation transactions. Some contactless terminals in the US do not support EMV-mode contactless transactions (even if they support EMV contact transactions), and therefore these visitors to the US will receive a "Could Not Complete Payment" error on the iPhone screen and an error on the terminal when attempting to use Apple Pay.

=== Apple Cash ===
Apple Cash, formerly Apple Pay Cash, is a feature that allows the transfer of money from one user to another via iMessage. When a user receives a payment, the funds are deposited in the recipient's Apple Cash card, where it is available for immediate use at merchants that accept Apple Pay. Prior to April 2022, the Apple Cash Card was provisioned as a Discover contactless debit card. Apple Cash device account numbers currently are issued/reissued on the Visa payment network, ensuring a larger acceptance for the Apple Cash card at more merchants.

Alternatively, the user can choose to transfer the balance to a nominated bank account via ACH transfer.

Since 2017, Apple Cash has been operated by Green Dot Corporation under the name "Green Dot Bank" and is available only for U.S. citizens or residents, 18 or older, with a physical residential address in the United States or Puerto Rico.

== Cost ==
Apple Pay does not cause additional fees for users and merchants. In Switzerland, for example, participating card issuers pay for the service. In 2020, Swiss banks paid a fixed commission 0.275 CHF (US$0.26) quarterly on every card to Apple. Additionally, they paid 0.12% for credit card transactions, and 0.17% for web or app based transactions. Swiss antitrust authorities require that an acquirer pays maximum 0.44% of the transaction amount to the issuer. The competition commission calls this amount "interchange fee". Apple charges between 27% and 39% of the credit card issuers' income earned from the acquirer.

== History ==
The service was in preparation for "a long time", as Apple acquired startups, hired executives and filed patents related to payments. Apple partnered with American Express, Mastercard and Visa. Their joint project began in January 2013, though they had discussed Apple's potential involvement for years. Their joint solution was a system where single-use digital tokens would replace the transfer of personal information. A Visa executive said that 750 people at the company worked on the anonymized "token" system for a year, and the other partners had similar teams in collaboration. Mastercard began work on the project in 2013 and hoped that their joint work would become a "standard for mobile payments". The announcement of the service came at a time when Mastercard and Visa policy created strong incentives for upgrading to mobile payment-compatible point of sale systems. Apple then approached several big banks in mid-2013 and did not divulge the names of the other banks. To maintain secrecy, JPMorgan set up a windowless "war room" where the majority of the sensitive work was done. Of their 300 people on the project, about 100 knew that the partner was Apple. Others close to the project did not know it was named "Apple Pay" until the announcement. The company's participation remained a secret leading up to its announcement.

The service was announced at Apple's iPhone 6 event on September 9, 2014. At its announcement, Apple CEO Tim Cook described the magnetic stripe card payment process as broken for its reliance on plastic cards' "outdated and vulnerable magnetic interface", "exposed numbers", and insecure "security codes". The iOS 8.1 software update accompanying the service's launch activated Apple Pay on compatible devices. The company announced an API for app developers to build Apple Pay checkout into their apps.

The service initially supported US-issued payment cards. An international roll-out was ongoing, beginning with support for UK-issued payment cards in July 2015. On December 17, 2015, Apple announced that it would launch Apple Pay with fifteen major banks in China, and Chinese users could start to use Apple Pay on February 18, 2016.

In October 2015, Apple Pay vice president Jennifer Bailey confirmed that KFC, Chili's, and Starbucks would begin accepting Apple Pay in 2016.

Bank of America is outfitting some of its ATMs with Apple Pay support and the ability to withdraw cash using it. The new Apple Pay enabled ATM is outfitted with the NFC reader and logo that Apple Pay users have become used to seeing since the service launched. The NFC reader is located directly to the left of the card reader, although unlike the card reader, the NFC reader does not light up. Bank of America has launched a new website detailing the simple process of withdrawing cash with a smartphone (Google Pay, Samsung Pay, or Apple Pay). Bank of America says that "Consumer Debit Cards, U.S. Trust Debit Cards, Small Business Debit Cards (owner card only)" are supported. Wells Fargo and JPMorgan Chase also integrated Apple Pay support into their ATMs.

On September 7, 2016, Apple announced that iPhone 7 and Apple Watch Series 2 users in Japan can add both local credit cards and FeliCa cards to their Apple Pay wallets. Only Suica cards are supported by Apple Pay, which can be used at subway stations, convenience stores, etc., just like regular Suica cards. Apple Pay also supports payment via all QUICPay and iD enabled terminals that are already popular in Japan.

On March 25, 2019, Apple Card was announced in partnership with Goldman Sachs and Mastercard.

In June 2024, it was announced that online Apple Pay purchases would be able to be initiated from third party devices. Users will be provided with a code they must scan with an iPhone running iOS 18 or later to complete the transaction.

== Legal scrutiny ==
=== United States ===
In 2022, Apple faced a class action lawsuit from Affinity Credit Union that claimed Apple engaged in anti-competitive conduct to privilege Apple Pay by limiting users' ability to use alternate payment options. A federal judge allowed the lawsuit to go forward in an October 2023 decision.

In 2023, the Consumer Financial Protection Bureau (CFPB) began rulemaking on a proposal that would make Apple Pay and other digital payments services subject to bank-like oversight. The rule was finalized in November 2024, and applies to six other non-bank services, including those provided by Google and Amazon. In 2024, the Department of Justice (DOJ) launched a broad antitrust suit against Apple; among other claims, the suit alleges that Apple has used anti-competitive practices to boost Apple Pay at the expense of rival payment platforms.

=== Europe ===
In June 2020, it was announced that the European Commission (EC) will take two probes against Apple, one focused on Apple Pay. According to EC, Apple was abusing its control of its payment wallet by blocking third-party payment access to the NFC hardware that enabled contactless payments. Apple opposed the claim and cited the COVID-19 pandemic as a cause of the increased number of people using contactless paying.

== Availability ==
=== Supported countries ===
Apple Pay Availability Map Available Suspended

Apple Pay can be used with any EMV contactless terminal globally as long as the customer is using a supported card. At least one issuer in each of the following countries and territories issues such cards.

Date launched	Support for payment cards issued in		
Date launched	Support for payment cards issued in	October 20, 2014	United States (Note: includes US Virgin Islands, except American Samoa, Guam, Northern Mariana Islands and Puerto Rico)
July 14, 2015	United Kingdom (Note: (except British Overseas Territories))		
November 17, 2015	Canada		
November 19, 2015	Australia		
February 18, 2016	China		
April 19, 2016	Singapore		
July 7, 2016	Switzerland		
July 19, 2016	France (Note: includes Guadeloupe, French Guiana, French Southern and Antarctic Lands, Martinique, Réunion, Saint Barthélemy, Saint Martin and Saint Pierre and Miquelon)		
July 19, 2016	Monaco		
July 20, 2016	Hong Kong		
October 4, 2016	Russia (Note: As of March 2022, Apple disabled Apple Pay for Mastercard and Visa in Russia until further notice because of sanctions imposed for the 2022 Russian invasion of Ukraine and due to financial uncertainty in Russia. Mir was later disabled on March 26, 2022.)		
October 13, 2016	New Zealand		
October 25, 2016	Japan		
December 1, 2016	Spain		
March 7, 2017	Guernsey		
March 7, 2017	Ireland		
March 7, 2017	Isle of Man		
March 7, 2017	Jersey		
March 29, 2017	Taiwan		
May 17, 2017	Italy		
May 17, 2017	San Marino		
May 17, 2017	Vatican City		
October 24, 2017	Denmark		
October 24, 2017	Finland		
October 24, 2017	Greenland		
October 24, 2017	Sweden		
October 24, 2017	United Arab Emirates		
April 4, 2018	Brazil		
May 17, 2018	Ukraine (Note: except Crimea and parts of Donetsk, Kherson, Luhansk and Zaporizhzhia Oblasts under Russian occupation)		
June 19, 2018	Poland		
June 20, 2018	Norway		
November 28, 2018	Belgium		
November 28, 2018	Kazakhstan		
December 11, 2018	Germany		
February 19, 2019	Czech Republic		
February 19, 2019	Saudi Arabia		
April 24, 2019	Austria		
May 8, 2019	Iceland		
May 21, 2019	Hungary		
May 21, 2019	Luxembourg		
June 11, 2019	Netherlands (Note: except overseas territories)		
June 26, 2019	Bulgaria		
June 26, 2019	Croatia		
June 26, 2019	Cyprus (Note: except Northern Cyprus)		
June 26, 2019	Estonia		
June 26, 2019	Greece		
June 26, 2019	Latvia		
June 26, 2019	Liechtenstein		
June 26, 2019	Lithuania		
June 26, 2019	Malta		
June 26, 2019	Portugal		
June 26, 2019	Romania		
June 26, 2019	Slovakia		
June 26, 2019	Slovenia		
July 2, 2019	Faroe Islands		
August 6, 2019	Macau		
September 3, 2019	Georgia (Note: except Abkhazia and South Ossetia)		
November 19, 2019	Belarus (Note: Only the enrollment of cards issued by non-sanctioned banks)		
January 28, 2020	Montenegro		
June 30, 2020	Serbia		
February 23, 2021	Mexico		
March 30, 2021	South Africa		
May 5, 2021	Israel		
August 17, 2021	Qatar		
October 5, 2021	Bahrain		
October 5, 2021	Palestine		
November 2, 2021	Azerbaijan		
November 2, 2021	Colombia		
November 2, 2021	Costa Rica		
January 18, 2022	Armenia		
March 15, 2022	Argentina		
March 15, 2022	Peru		
April 5, 2022	Moldova (Note: except Transnistria)		
August 9, 2022	Malaysia		
December 6, 2022	Jordan		
December 6, 2022	Kuwait		
March 21, 2023	South Korea		
May 2, 2023	El Salvador		
May 2, 2023	Guatemala		
May 16, 2023	Honduras		
May 16, 2023	Panama		
July 18, 2023	Morocco		
August 8, 2023	Chile		
August 8, 2023	Vietnam		
April 16, 2024	Ecuador		
August 6, 2024	Dominican Republic		
September 24, 2024	Oman		
November 5, 2024	Paraguay		
December 3, 2024	Uruguay		
December 10, 2024	Egypt		
December 10, 2024	Mongolia		
March 18, 2025	Puerto Rico		
June 3, 2025	Bahamas		
July 29, 2025	Albania		
July 29, 2025	Andorra		
July 29, 2025	Bosnia and Herzegovina		
July 29, 2025	Kosovo		
July 29, 2025	North Macedonia		
April 9, 2026	French Polynesia		
April 9, 2026	New Caledonia		
May 19, 2026	Mauritius		
July 28, 2026	Kyrgyzstan		
July 28, 2026	Tajikistan		
August 4, 2026	Philippines		
September 30, 2026	India		
October 27, 2026	Uzbekistan		

=== Supported card payment networks ===
- Visa (worldwide. Japanese Visa cards in Apple Pay also function as FeliCa-based QUICPay or iD cards in addition to EMV contactless cards, although some issuers do not support EMV contactless in Apple Pay, meaning such cards will only function as QUICPay or iD cards.)
  - V Pay (only in Europe)
- Mastercard (worldwide. Japanese Mastercard cards in Apple Pay also function as FeliCa-based QUICPay or iD cards in addition to EMV contactless cards, although some issuers do not support EMV contactless in Apple Pay, meaning such cards will only function as QUICPay or iD cards.)
  - Maestro (worldwide)
- American Express (worldwide, except China. Japanese American Express cards in Apple Pay also function as FeliCa-based QUICPay cards in addition to EMV contactless cards.)
- Discover Card (only in the United States)
- US Debit (only in the United States, CDCVM may not be supported, requiring the customer to enter their PIN on the terminal.)
- Interac (only in Canada)
- EFTPOS (only in Australia)
- Diners Club International (only in Japan. Only function as FeliCa-based QUICPay cards and do not support the global EMV contactless standard.)
- JCB (worldwide. Japanese JCB cards in Apple Pay also function as FeliCa-based QUICPay or iD cards in addition to EMV contactless cards, although some issuers do not support EMV contactless in Apple Pay, meaning such cards will only function as QUICPay or iD cards.)
- Cartes Bancaires (CB) (only in France)
- China UnionPay (only in China, Hong Kong and Macau)
- Dankort (only in Denmark)
- Suica, PASMO, ICOCA, TOICA, iD, QUICPay, WAON, and nanaco (only in Japan. FeliCa-supported iPhone and Apple Watch models only.)
- SPTC transit card (only in Shanghai)
- Yikatong (only in Beijing)
- Mada (only in Saudi Arabia)
- Elo (only in Brazil)
- Octopus (only in Hong Kong. FeliCa-supported iPhone and Apple Watch models only.)
- girocard (only in Germany)
- Mir (only in Russia, suspended on March 26, 2022)
- Bancontact (only in Belgium)
- Meeza (only in Egypt)
- BankAxept (only in Norway)
- NAPAS (only in Vietnam)
- T-money (only in South Korea)
- Himyan (only in Qatar)
- MyDebit (only in Malaysia)
- Jaywan (only in the United Arab Emirates)
- Bancomat (only in Italy)

== Reception ==
=== Reviews ===
Journalists in the United States noted that the multiple previously unsuccessful efforts of other retailers to build mobile payments services, including those of PayPal, Walmart, Target, Google Wallet, and Softcard. They noted that previous efforts did not solve customer inconvenience issues, and felt that Apple Pay potentially did. The Verge's Adrianne Jeffries noted that mobile payment market fragmentation was partially due to Apple's refusal to enter the market. BusinessWeek's Joshua Brustein added that Apple has a history of letting "first movers fail" with an early version of the service before releasing "a more polished version of the same idea". The Verge's Dieter Bohn called Apple Pay the "week's most revolutionary product" and the announcement "a classic Apple moment of simplification and integration", and the partnership between payments services and Apple "a rare piece of collaboration and agreement". He predicted that the service's effect on the mobile payments industry would be similar to the iPhone's effect on the smartphone industry. Nathaniel Popper of The New York Times referred to the banks' level of coordination with Apple as "elaborate" and indicative of mutual "preparation and investment". Some analysts added that the service could reduce the standard credit card transaction fees over time since fees traditionally cover credit card fraud. The banks were willing to work with Apple in the face of efforts like Bitcoin and the Merchant Customer Exchange, which seeks to work around the card networks.

Early reviews of the service regarded it as easy to use, but were not sure whether the service would become widely adopted. The Verge's Nilay Patel wrote that the product demo was "remarkably smooth" and "a cohesive user experience". Patel said the process took five to ten seconds at a retail card reader and added that it may be less smooth at stores such as Walgreens, where cashiers prompt customers for loyalty cards and charity donations. The New York Times' Neil Irwin wrote that Apple exaggerated the inconvenience of credit cards. Among the plastic card's benefits, he included how others could make purchases on another's behalf and how dead cell phones could leave the owner stranded.

In a 2018 publication released by Consumer Reports, Apple Pay Cash was the leading peer-to-peer payment service.

=== Adoption ===
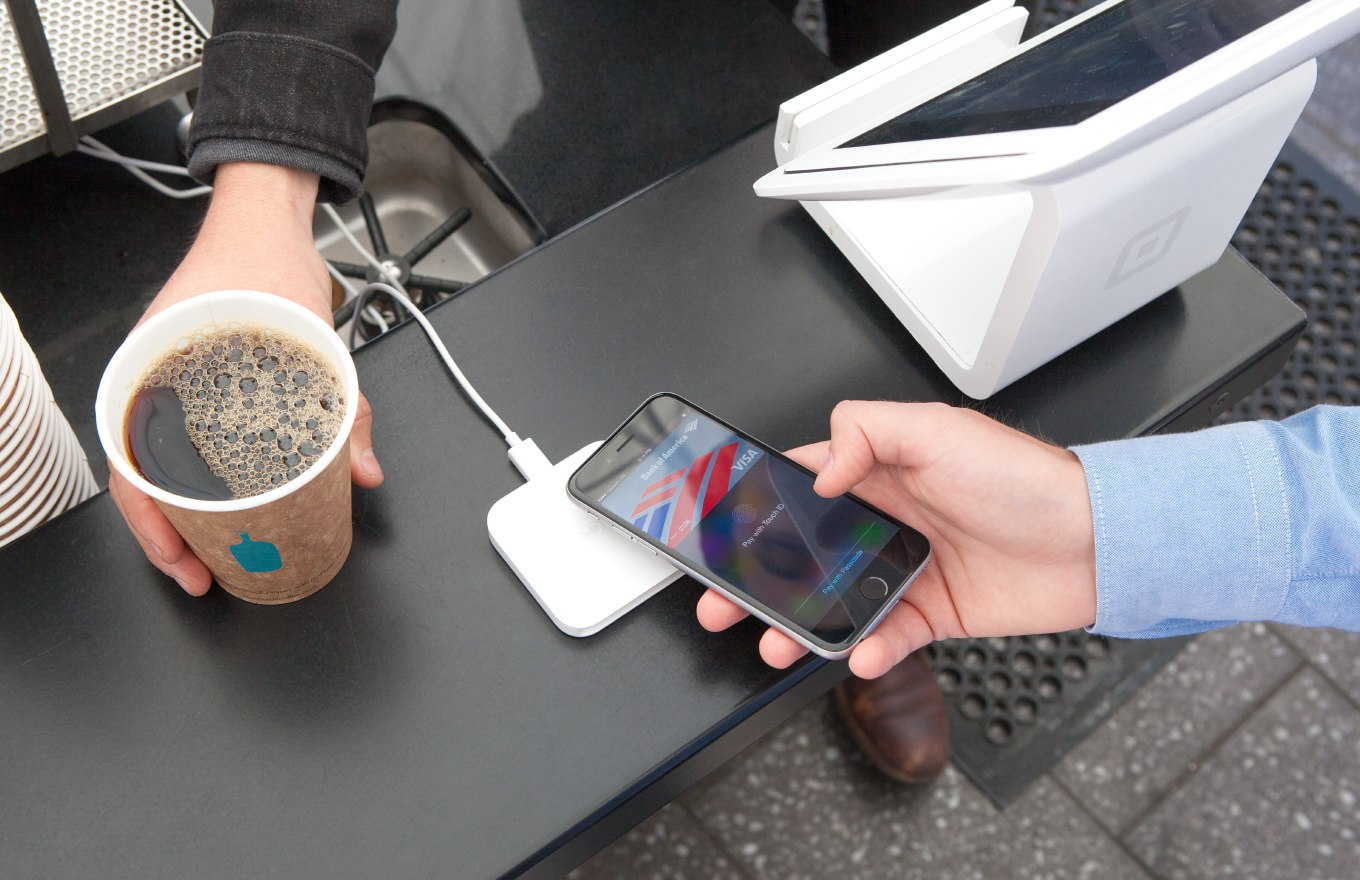
Paying for coffee with Square's contactless + chip reader

Apple announced that more than one million credit cards had been registered on Apple Pay in the first three days of its availability, making it the largest mobile payment system in the United States at the time. There were 220,000 participating vendors when it launched.

In the United States, Apple faced opposition by the mobile payments industry, particularly the Merchant Customer Exchange (MCX) which was starting a competing system known as CurrentC. Several participants of CurrentC, such as Best Buy, Walmart, and Publix had initially stated that they would not accept Apple Pay as a result of exclusivity deals. CVS Pharmacy and Rite Aid subsequently disabled all NFC payment systems in favor of CurrentC, although due to the exclusivity period ending in August 2015, Rite Aid started to accept it August 15, 2015. Both CVS and Best Buy started to accept Apple Pay at all stores starting in October 2015. MCX and CurrentC ended in March 2017. Walmart started to roll out Apple Pay on August 24, 2026.

Target's CEO Brian Cornell said that they would be open to accepting Apple Pay eventually after the conversion to chip and PIN technology is done, but they remain involved with MCX. On January 22, 2019, Target announced the roll-out of Apple Pay support to all of its stores in the United States.

Transport for London, one of Apple Pay's official UK launch partners and one of the largest contactless merchants in the world, became the UK's most used Apple Pay merchant.

As of February 11, 2016, 20% of iPhone 6 users in the United States reported using the service at least once. Apple maintains an up-to-date list of banks that accept Apple Pay on its website.

On June 2, 2016, according to Fortune, Apple said its mobile payment platform is gaining a million new users each week, yet the company did not reveal the total number of Apple Pay users. Apple also revealed that transaction volume through the service is five times what it was a year ago, and that payment volume within apps more than doubled in the second half of 2015.

With the launch of Apple Pay in China, the service hit three million provisions inside its first three days, while, more generally, it is adding one million new users per week worldwide.

On July 11, 2016, Liquor Control Board of Ontario (LCBO) confirmed that it accepts Apple Pay at all of its over 850 stores in Ontario, Canada. LCBO had been gradually rolling out Apple Pay support since June at its stores, which had NFC-based terminals for contactless payments.

Starting on August 19, 2016, Apple Pay will be available in Chick-fil-A restaurants across the United States, allowing fast food buyers to make their purchases both in-store and at the drive-thru using Apple Pay.

On September 7, 2016, Wayfair announced that they will support Apple Pay online.

On May 22, 2018, TransLink announced support for Apple Pay at all fare gates and on buses.

On July 31, 2018, Tim Cook announced that both CVS and 7-Eleven in the United States will support the service.

On May 31, 2019, New York City Transit announced support for Apple Pay at its OMNY terminals on busses and subways.

On August 21, 2019, and December 23, 2019, Miami Dade Transit announced support for Apple Pay at all fare gates and on buses.

In February 2020, Apple Pay accounted for 5% of global card transactions. On April 4, 2020, Publix CEO Todd Jones announced Publix would be supporting Apple Pay immediately to help consumers fight COVID-19.
