= Apple Card =

Credit card developed by Apple Inc.

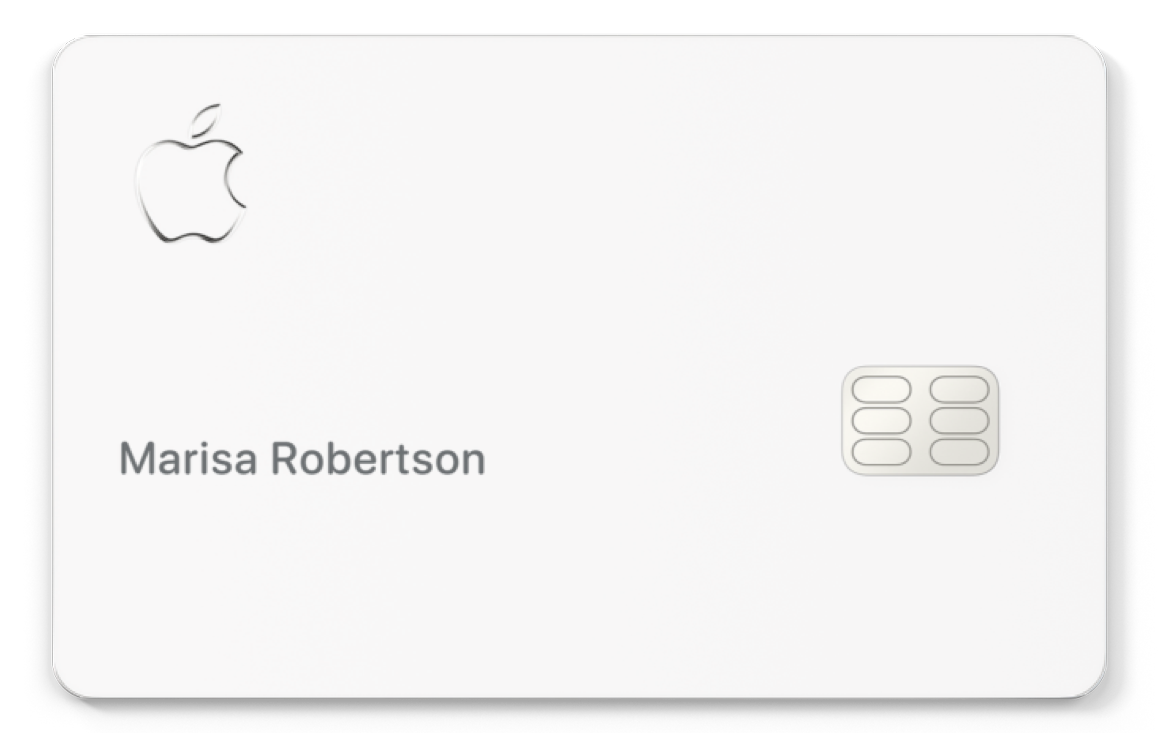
- Example of physical Apple Card
- Location: United States
- Launched: August 20, 2019; 7 years ago
- Technology: Credit card; Contactless payment; Apple Pay
- Operator: Apple Inc. (developer); Goldman Sachs (issuing bank); Mastercard (payment network)
- Website: www.apple.com/apple-card/

Apple Card is a credit card created by Apple Inc. and currently issued by Goldman Sachs, designed primarily to be used with Apple Pay on an Apple device such as an iPhone, iPad, Apple Watch, or Mac. Apple Card is available only in the United States, with 12 million cardholders as of early 2024.

== History ==
Apple Card was announced at the Apple Special Event on March 25, 2019. Unlike previous special events which have historically served as platforms to announce upcoming hardware or software, this event focused on new internet software and services. Other services announced at the event include Apple TV+, Apple News+, and Apple Arcade.

On August 6, 2019, invitations to an early preview started being sent to randomly selected users who had previously signed up for email notifications ahead of Apple Card's official launch. It was released in the United States on August 20, 2019. Additional cardholders and joint accounts were not supported at its launch.

The card features a number of consumer-friendly features including no fees, software that encourages users to avoid debt or pay it down quickly, the industry's lowest interest rate range for comparable cards, and a mandate to approve as many iPhone users as possible. These features are seen as being risky for a bank to take on, and led other banks with established consumer credit card operations including Apple's long time partner Barclays, along with Citigroup, JPMorgan Chase and Synchrony, to turn down Apple's proposal. Goldman Sachs defended the terms of the deal saying they were "thrilled" with the partnership and seeking "to disrupt consumer finance by putting the customer first."

On April 20, 2021, Apple announced that it would be introducing joint accounts and additional cardholders. These features have been introduced under the brand Apple Card Family. Individuals 18 years and older can be co-owners of the account, while individuals 13 years and older can be additional cardholders. Up to five individuals may be additional cardholders or co-owners.

In January 2023, Bloomberg reported that Goldman Sachs suffered $1 billion in losses because of the card.

On April 17, 2023, Apple began offering a high-yield savings account backed by Goldman Sachs to Apple Card users. The Wall Street Journal reported in June 2023 that Goldman Sachs had entered into discussions with American Express to explore the possibility that American Express might take over the partnership, replacing Goldman.

On January 7, 2026, Apple announced that JPMorgan Chase would take over issuing the Apple Card in "approximately 24 months", i.e. in 2028.

== Enrollment ==
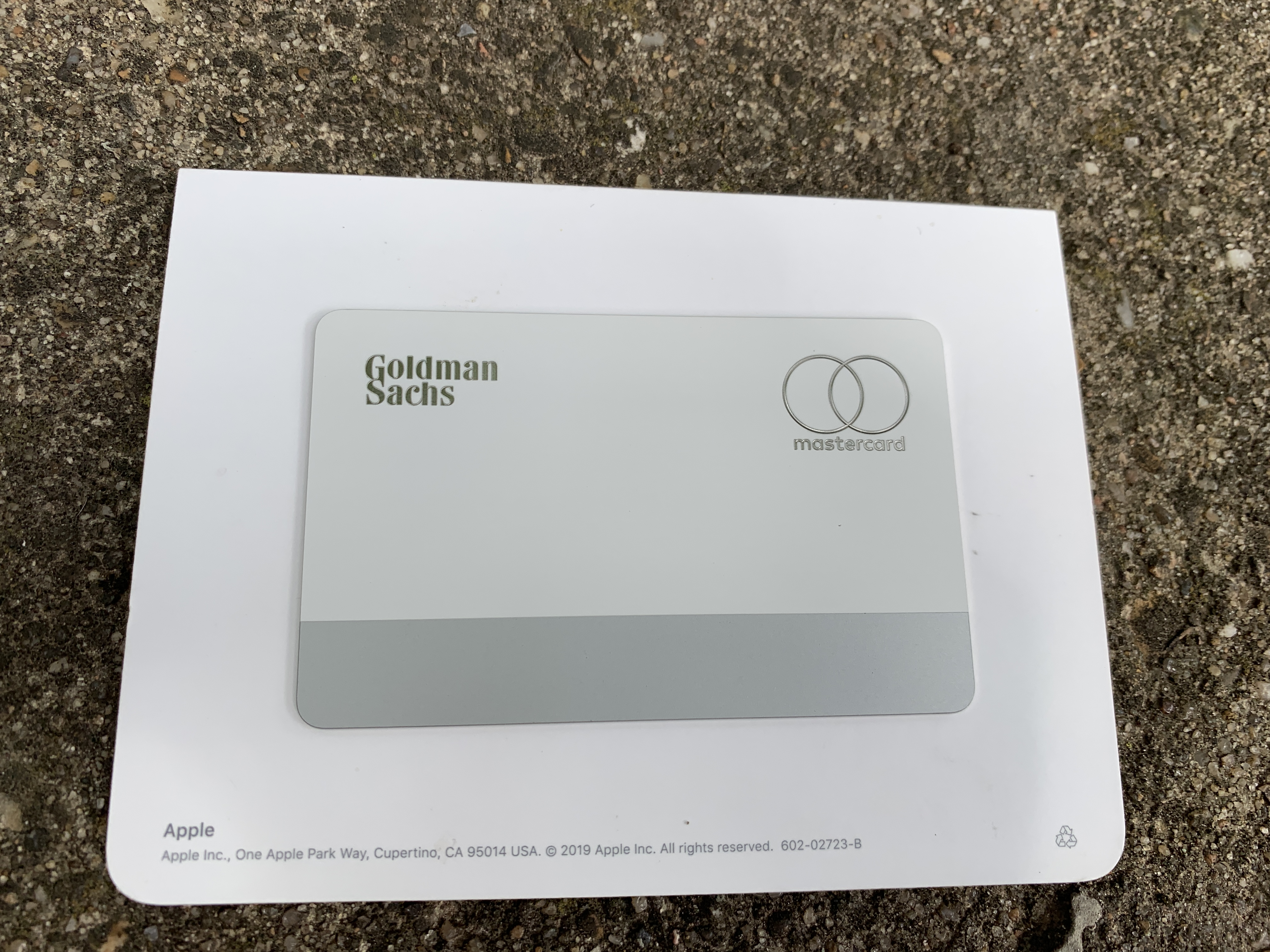
Back side of the physical Apple Card showing the Goldman Sachs and Mastercard logos

=== Instant issuance ===
Users can apply for an Apple Card directly from within the Wallet app. Upon approval, a digital Apple Card is made available immediately on all of the user's devices. Users also can order a physical card for use at locations that do not accept contactless payments.

The physical card does not display numbers on the front; instead, users receive a 16-digit virtual card number for websites and apps that do not accept Apple Pay. Apple Card details are accessible in the user's iCloud Keychain and can be auto-filled into online forms.

=== Titanium card ===
Apple has designed a titanium Apple Card for shopping at locations where Apple Pay contactless payment is not accepted. The logos on the card are engraved, and the cardholder's name is laser-etched onto the card. The card has no card number, CVV security code, expiration date, or signature printed on the card.

On delivery, users with the iPhone XS and above can activate the physical card by moving their phone near a NFC tag concealed within the card's packaging. Users with an iPhone X or earlier need to open the Wallet app before tapping the phone against the card.

== Features ==
=== Cashback ===
Regular purchases made using the physical card earn 1%, purchases made with Apple Pay earn 2%, and purchases at Apple Stores and selected partners earn 3%. Cashback on eligible purchases is deposited into the customer's Apple Cash account, or deposited in the customer's Apple Card Savings Account, or applied as a statement credit.

=== Fees ===
Apple Card does not charge late, foreign transaction, returned payment, or annual credit card fees, but it does generate interest fees when carrying a balance and interchange fees charged to the vendor.

=== Apple Card Savings ===
Launched on April 17, 2023, it allows Apple Card owners and co-owners to open a 4.15% savings account to deposit their Daily Cash, with no fees and no minimum balance.

=== Card management ===
The Wallet app collates Apple Card transactions by category and provides weekly and monthly activity summaries. Apple Maps is used to provide a colour-coded category, map location, and contact details for the merchant (where available).

Apple added support for users to give third-party budgeting apps access to transaction data for budget management in iOS 17.4

=== Privacy and security ===
A unique card number is created for each device and is stored in a secure element which is used by Apple Pay to handle transactions and on-device cryptographic functions. Each transaction uses its own one-time dynamic security code and is authorized with Face ID, Touch ID, or passcode.

As with Apple Cash, transaction history for Apple Card is stored on and synced across devices using iCloud and encrypted such that only the authorized account holder can view it. Two-factor authentication must be enabled on the user's Apple Account in order to apply for Apple Card.

== Controversies ==
In 2024, the Consumer Financial Protection Bureau ordered Apple and Goldman Sachs to pay over $89 million over allegations the two "illegally mishandled transaction disputes and misled iPhone purchasers about interest-free payment options". In 2025, under the second Trump administration, the CFPB terminated Apple's consent order years ahead of schedule.

== Partnerships ==
For Apple Card's initial US launch, Goldman Sachs assumed the role of the issuing bank, while Mastercard served as the payment network. However, Goldman planned to quit the consumer lending business including Apple Card, which led to many big banks including JPMorgan Chase and Synchrony Financial approaching Apple to express their interest of takeover.

In April 2025, Visa offered a $100 million upfront payment for replacing Mastercard as Apple Card's issuer.

In January 2026, JPMorgan Chase reached a deal worth $2.2 billion with Apple to take over from Goldman Sachs as the issuer of Apple Card. The transition period is reportedly expected to last 24 months.

== Reception ==
In March 2020, about 3.1 million Americans held the Apple Card. That number grew to 6.7 million cardholders as of early 2022 and to 12 million by early 2024. Six in ten Apple Card users use it as their primary credit card.

On October 1, 2019, MarketWatch published an article stating that Goldman Sachs is not reporting payments to the credit reporting agencies. The article suggests that Apple and Goldman Sachs rushed development of the card, and that the companies would fix the issue over time.

On November 7, 2019, David Heinemeier Hansson posted on Twitter that he was given 20 times the credit limit than was offered to his wife despite her having a better credit score. He accused Goldman Sachs of gender discrimination by using algorithms to determine a person's credit limit. Apple's co-founder Steve Wozniak also tweeted that he received ten times the credit limit that his wife was offered. In response to Hansson's tweets, the New York State Department of Financial Services launched an investigation into Goldman Sachs's practices.

On March 23, 2021, the New York State Department of Financial Services issued a report summarizing its findings after investigating consumer complaints about the Apple Card. The investigation, which included a review of several thousand pages of records and written responses from Goldman Sachs Bank and Apple, interviews of witnesses and Apple Card applicants, and analysis of underwriting data for approximately 400,000 New York State applicants for the Apple Card, did not produce evidence of unlawful discrimination against applicants under fair lending law.
