= Merchant Customer Exchange =

American company

- Type: LLC
- Headquarters: Waltham, Massachusetts, United States
- Owner: JPMorgan Chase

Merchant Customer Exchange (MCX) was an American company created by a consortium of U.S. retail companies to develop a merchant-owned mobile payment system, which was to be called "CurrentC." The joint venture was announced on August 15, 2012.

The company was led by merchants such as 7-Eleven, Alon Brands, Best Buy, CVS Health, Darden Restaurants, HMSHost, Hy-Vee, Lowe's, Michaels, Publix, Sears Holdings, Shell Oil Products US, Sunoco, Target Corporation and Walmart. The initial retailers that were part of the company account for about $1 trillion in annual sales.

In March 2017, the technology developed by MCX was purchased by JPMorgan Chase for its Chase Pay system.

== CurrentC ==
MCX's flagship product was CurrentC, a mobile payments platform. The system utilized a smartphone app and digital wallet: to make a purchase, the user scanned a QR code shown on the cashier's screen, or had the cashier scan a QR code from the phone's screen. Instead of transmitting financial data over the internet, the transaction used a token placeholder that was then converted by the financial institution to initiate the Automated Clearing House (ACH), gift card, private label charge card or other type of payment and charge the consumer. The CurrentC app also included features that would help the user locate a retailer, display coupons, display loyalty program details, and track receipts using data collected from transactions and the user's device.

The system was designed by Joseph Corcoran and provided to MCX under NDA and based on the granted US Patent that he invented. Gemalto was contracted to provide the backend processing. Weeks after Dekkers Davidson became CEO of MCX, Dekkers favoured doing a deal with Paydiant instead (A company he already had a relationship with). The breach of the Gemalto contract resulted in a Court Judgment being granted to Gemalto against MCX for over $40 million. Paydiant is a startup based in Boston, now acquired by PayPal. The system, intentionally, does not support all credit cards, as one of its goals is to prevent merchants from having to pay their interchange fees. CurrentC transactions can directly debit customers' banking accounts via the ACH system.

On launch, CurrentC supported the use of QR codes, Bluetooth Low Energy beacons and geolocation, unlike its competitors which mainly use near-field communications. CurrentC entered public beta for users in Columbus, Ohio in September 2015. The trial period at Target stores ended on June 30, 2016.

=== Reception ===
The soft launch of CurrentC was met with controversy. Critics felt that MCX members were engaging in collusion by attempting to prevent the use of competing, near-field communications-based contactless payment services, such as Apple Pay and Google Pay—both of which are backed by companies involved in the wireless industry—at their establishments. MCX members Best Buy and Walmart explicitly stated that they would not support Apple Pay at their stores, while in late-October 2014, CVS Health and Rite Aid silently disabled the ability to use NFC payments entirely.

Although The New York Times reported that this was a contractual requirement which could result in fines if retailers do not comply, MCX CEO Dekkers Davidson denied this claim, stating that it was up to individual retailers to decide which payment systems they want to support, but made a statement implying a technological limitation preventing the use of the system alongside other contactless payment systems at the present time. Davidson later admitted that it had requested that MCX members implement exclusivity for CurrentC for a period lasting several months in order to give the platform "breathing room", and denied any direct order to CVS requiring that it stop accepting other NFC-based payment methods. On October 30, 2014, regional supermarket chain and MCX member Meijer denied any plans to disable competing contactless payment services.

The security of the system was also a cause for concern: on October 29, 2014, the company revealed that some email addresses of participants and individuals participating in the pilot program had been accessed. No information about the number of individuals affected by this hack has been disclosed. CurrentC can also collect customer data for use by merchants: its privacy policy states that the service's software may collect location data for the purposes of completing transactions, protected health information during medical-oriented transactions, and information about the device and operating system the app is installed on. The service may, on an opt-out basis, also collect information for use in connection with marketing and loyalty programs.

In response to the concerns surrounding its security issues and the anti-competitive actions performed by MCX members, a semi-organized campaign emerged on the iOS App Store and Google Play Store to give the CurrentC software negative and low-scoring reviews in protest.

On April 28, 2015, Best Buy announced that it would begin to support Apple Pay at its locations, explaining that "today's consumers have many different ways to spend their money and we want to give our customers as many options as possible in how they pay for goods and services at Best Buy." On August 11, 2015, Rite Aid followed suit by announcing that contactless readers would return to all of its 4,600 U.S. stores, giving Apple Pay and Google Wallet users the ability to use those services as a method of payment once again.

=== Deactivation ===
In May 2016, MCX announced that they were postponing a nationwide rollout of the CurrentC application. A month later, MCX sent e-mails to its testers saying that their accounts would be deleted by the end of June. The e-mail stated, “We will be concluding our beta test and postponing further releases of CurrentC on June 28, 2016. Therefore, June 28 will be the last day that transactions will be accepted using CurrentC.”

A spokesman for MCX stated that the company has “not announced future timelines or plans around the app but we’re looking forward to analyzing and learning from the data we collected throughout the beta.”
