= Meijer =

American hypermarket chain

Meijer Inc.
- Logo used since 2004

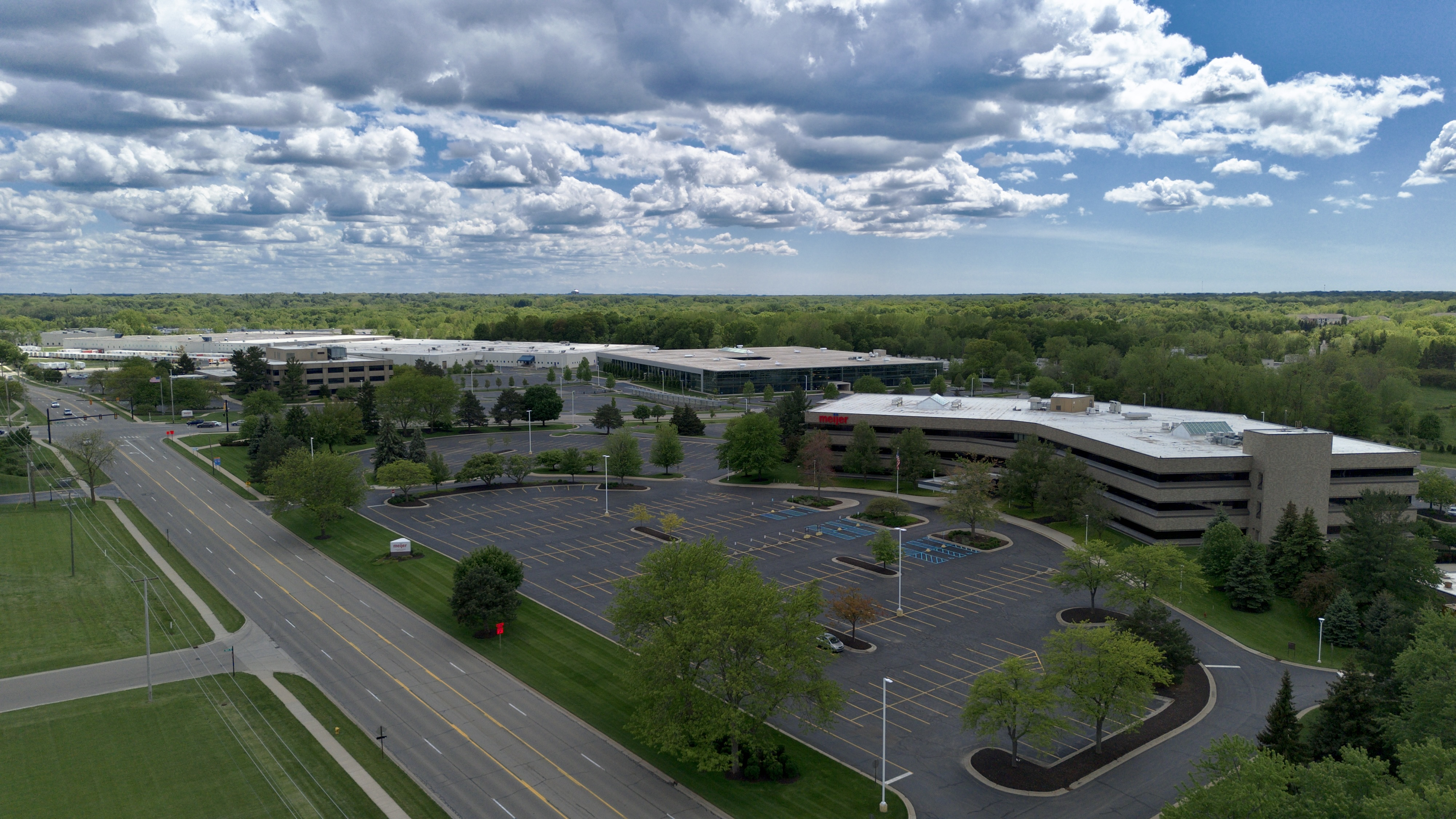
- Headquarters in Walker, Michigan
- Type: Private
- Industry: Retail (Grocery & Discount); Fuel stations
- Founded: 1934; 92 years ago Greenville, Michigan, U.S.
- Founder: Hendrik Meijer
- Headquarters: Walker, Michigan, U.S.
- Number of locations: Stores: 282 (2026); Fuel stations: 244 (2026)
- Area served: Michigan, Indiana, Illinois, Ohio, Kentucky, and Wisconsin
- Key people: Frederik Meijer, former chairman emeritus Hank Meijer, co-chair Mark Murray, co-chair Doug Meijer, co-chair Rick Keyes, President and CEO
- Products: Groceries, clothing, footwear, fuel, sporting clothing, bedding, furniture, jewelry, health and beauty products, toys, sporting equipment, electronics, housewares and pet supplies
- Revenue: ▲US$21.95 billion (2023)
- Owner: Meijer Companies LTD. (Meijer family (100%))
- Number of employees: 70,000 (Jan. 2020)
- Website: meijer.com

Meijer Inc. (/ˈmaɪ.ər/, MY-ər) is an American regional supercenter chain headquartered in Walker, Michigan, a suburb of Grand Rapids. The company currently operates in the states of Michigan, Illinois, Indiana, Kentucky, Ohio, and Wisconsin, and is planning expansion into Pennsylvania. Meijer operates over 500 stores, including over 270 "supercenters", as well as numerous smaller-scale supermarkets, grocery stores, and fuel stations.

The company was founded in 1934 as a supermarket chain in Greenville, Michigan, by Dutch immigrant Hendrik Meijer. Since then, Meijer has grown throughout the Great Lakes region of the United States, and today employs about 70,000 people. It is ranked by Forbes as the 14th-largest private company in the United States, and is the country's 23rd-largest retailer by revenue as of 2025.

== History ==
1957 logo

1966 logo

1984 logo

Meijer was founded as Meijer's in Greenville, Michigan, in 1934 by Hendrik Meijer, a Dutch immigrant. Meijer was a local barber who entered the grocery business during the Great Depression. His first employees included his 14-year-old son, Frederik Meijer, who later became chairman of the company. The current co-chairmen, brothers Hank and Doug Meijer, are Hendrik's grandsons. After studying trends in the grocery industry, Meijer was among the first stores to offer self-service shopping and shopping carts. He also offered staple items, such as vinegar, at bargain prices.

The Greenville store was successful and additional Meijer groceries were opened in Cedar Springs (1942) and Ionia (1946). The first Grand Rapids store opened on South Division Avenue in 1949. By the 1960s, the company operated more than 24 stores throughout West Michigan.

=== First supercenters and expansion throughout Michigan ===
In 1962, Meijer launched its modern format with a store at the corner of 28th Street and Kalamazoo Avenue in Grand Rapids called "Thrifty Acres." At a size of 180,000 square feet (17,000 m^{2}), it combined grocery shopping and department store shopping in a single large store. This location is often considered to be the first "hypermarket" in the United States. The store was built with six-inch-thick (150 mm) floors, so should the concept fail, the nongrocery half could be converted into an indoor car dealership. New stores were built in the same manner until the mid-1970s, when an architect mentioned the extra cost to management. This was followed by the first Mid-Michigan location in Delta Charter Township in 1966. Meijer expanded into Southeast Michigan in the early 1970s, beginning with a store in Ypsilanti in 1972 followed by their first Metro Detroit location in Canton in 1974. Meijer expanded into Northern Michigan with a location in Traverse City in 1977.

Fred Meijer took over the company upon his father's death in 1964. Under his leadership, the Thrifty Acres stores became a success and were renamed Meijer in 1986. Meijer's stand-alone grocery operations continued until the early 1990s, as the larger stores became dominant.

In 1985, Forbes magazine reported Walmart at the time had failed in what were then known as hypermarkets because Sam Walton and company did not understand the grocery business. Walton launched the first Hypermart USA store in 1987, opening only four stores, the last in 1990. An article in Forbes Magazine said Meijer understood the importance of the food business, and it was not something just tacked onto a discount store. The quality of the produce is very important; poor-quality produce sold by Walmart was the main reason for their lack of success. By contrast, surveys said then and now that Meijer ranks high on produce quality.

=== 1990s expansions ===
During the mid-1990s, Meijer expanded to three additional states. The first location in Indiana opened in Mishawaka in April 1994, followed by the first Illinois store in Champaign in April 1995. In 1996, Meijer entered the Cincinnati market with the opening of five supercenters, including its first store in Kentucky, in Florence. Additional Kentucky locations opened in Lexington and Louisville in 1998.

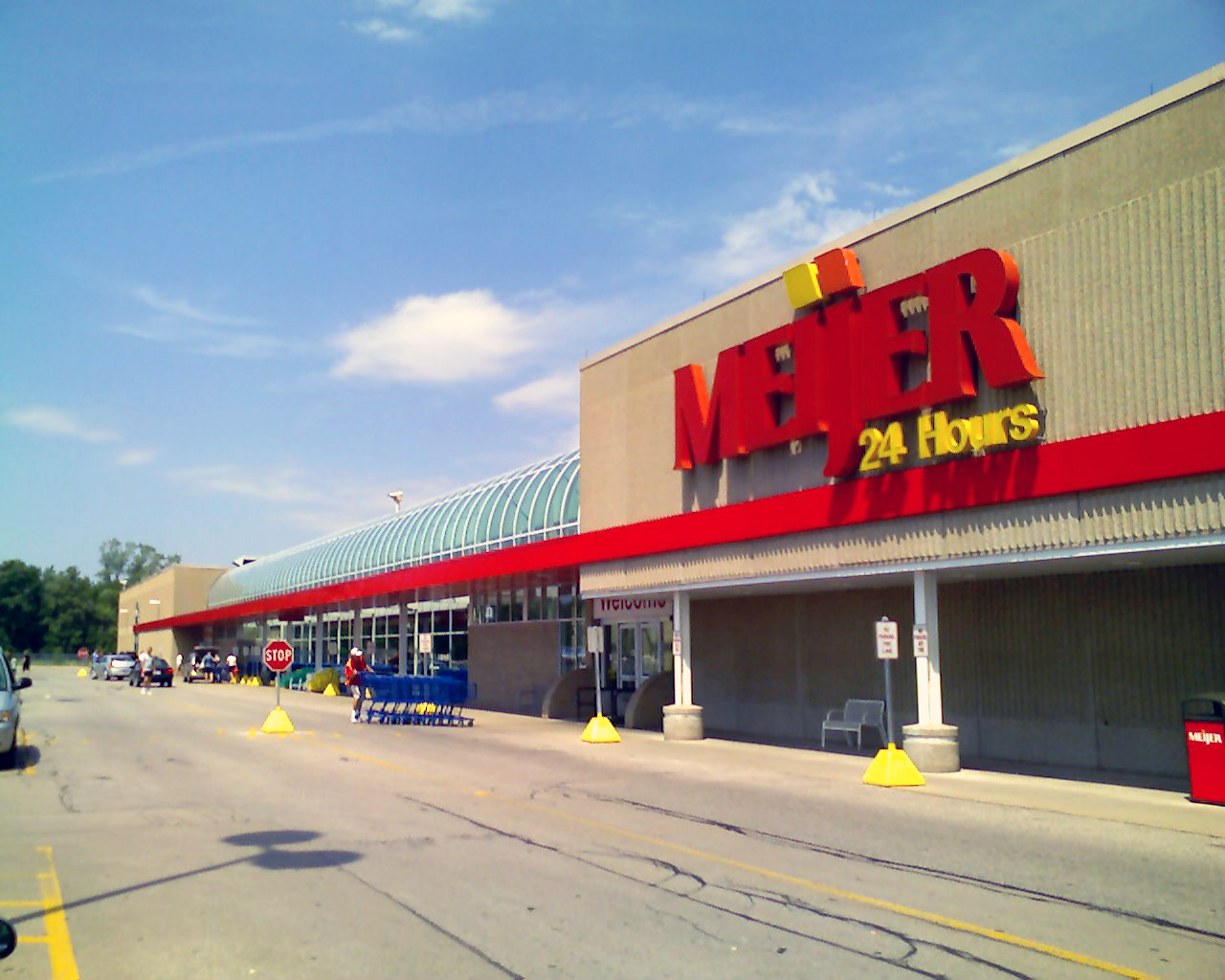
Meijer in Midland, Michigan in 2006.

The first Meijer location in Northwest Indiana opened in Michigan City in August 1997. The location in Merrillville, Indiana, opened in August 1998, was Meijer's first in the Chicago metropolitan area. This was followed by two more Indiana Meijer stores in Highland and Jeffersonville in April 1999, the latter of which was the first in Southern Indiana. In August 1999, Meijer opened its first store in the Illinois suburbs of Chicago on Weber Road in Bolingbrook. A year later in 2000, three additional Illinois Meijer locations opened in Aurora, St. Charles, and Springfield.

=== 2000s corporate restructuring ===
With the increasing dominance of Walmart throughout the country during the 1990s and up to the present, Meijer is facing the effects of an intensely competitive retail industry. In late 2003 the company laid off 350 people from the corporate offices, distribution centers and field offices; a few months later, in January 2004, Meijer laid off 1,896 employees and managerial staff, leading to speculation that the company was losing profitability and market share. A marketing professor, Dr. Ben Rudolph of Grand Valley State University near Meijer's corporate headquarters, lambasted this move, saying they "apparently blinked" and that Meijer's "decision was driven by panic". Continuing cutbacks in 2006, the company outsourced 81 information technology positions to India.

In 2003, the company announced that all new Meijer stores would feature an entirely new format and company image, complete with a new logo intended to make the Meijer stores seem "friendly" and inviting. The company hired DeVito/Verdi that April to produce advertisements, and retained Rockwell Group to redesign the existing stores and establish a design for new stores. The "new theatrics" for the then-71-year-old company originally started as a "new product introduction program" until David Rockwell talked Hank and Fred Meijer into further changes. Rockwell told the Meijers the new introduction program would "work only if it was part of a new overall creative foundation based on a fresher, younger approach, encompassing architecture, interior design and graphic design". In 2005, despite cutbacks, Meijer embarked on an expansion plan to increase its number of stores in Illinois, Michigan and Ohio.

In May 2007, the first LEED-certified Meijer store opened, at Fairlane Green in Allen Park, Michigan.

In July 2007, Meijer announced to the Michigan press it would be "restructuring" its Team Leader management positions in all 181 stores, stating layoffs would be "minimal" and necessary "to handle more sophisticated products such as flat-screen TVs and high-priced wines". Their spokesperson also said the changes were "not about a labor reduction", but fitting people into the right roles. No corporate staff or hourly workers were directly affected. In August 2007, the store announced they were cutting about 500 managers (12% of existing management staff). The 500 were given severance packages, while other managers were transferred to other stores or "reassigned to different positions".

=== 2010s-2020s ===
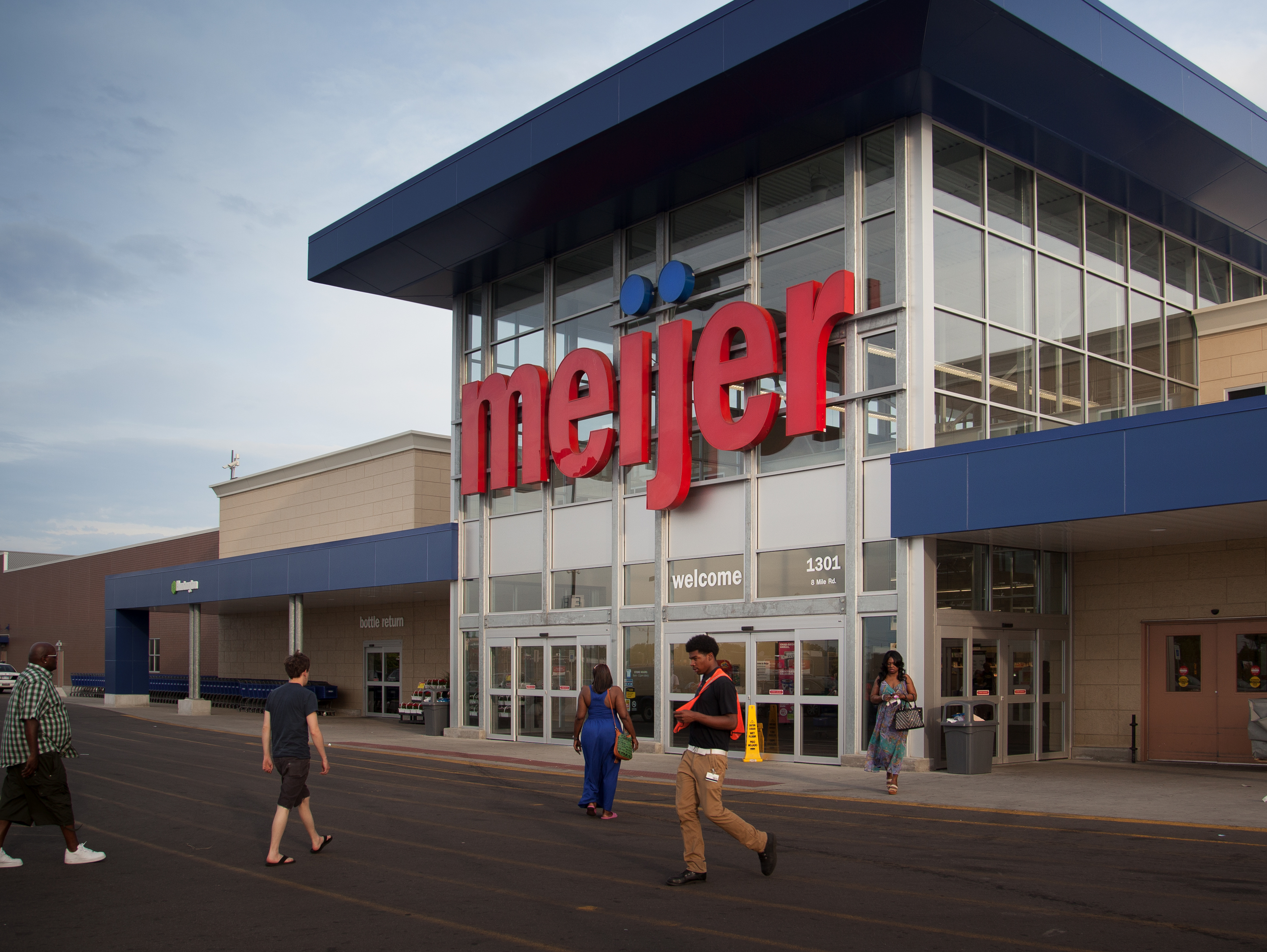
The Gateway Marketplace Meijer store, opened in 2013 as the first Meijer to open within the city of Detroit.

On November 25, 2011, Frederik Meijer died at the age of 91.

In May 2013, Meijer opened its 200th supercenter, in Swartz Creek, Michigan, followed in July by the first location in the city of Detroit, at the Gateway Marketplace development near the former Michigan State Fairgrounds. A second Detroit location opened in June 2015, on the former site of Redford High School in Northwest Detroit.

In 2014, Meijer became the first retailer to accept both Apple Pay and CurrentC for purchases in its stores and fuel stations, despite possible penalties from Merchant Customer Exchange for accepting Apple Pay.

In 2014, Meijer opened a supercenter in Bowling Green, Kentucky, the chain's southernmost location to date. Meijer opened its first locations in Wisconsin in June 2015. To help promote itself in Wisconsin, Meijer purchased a distribution center in Pleasant Prairie from SuperValu in 2012, and placed an advertisement along the outfield wall of Miller Park, home of the Milwaukee Brewers, in 2014 in anticipation of the company's expansion into Wisconsin.

Meijer bought the largely vacant Memorial Mall in Sheboygan, Wisconsin, in March 2015. Much of the existing structure was demolished, and replaced with a new store in April 2019.

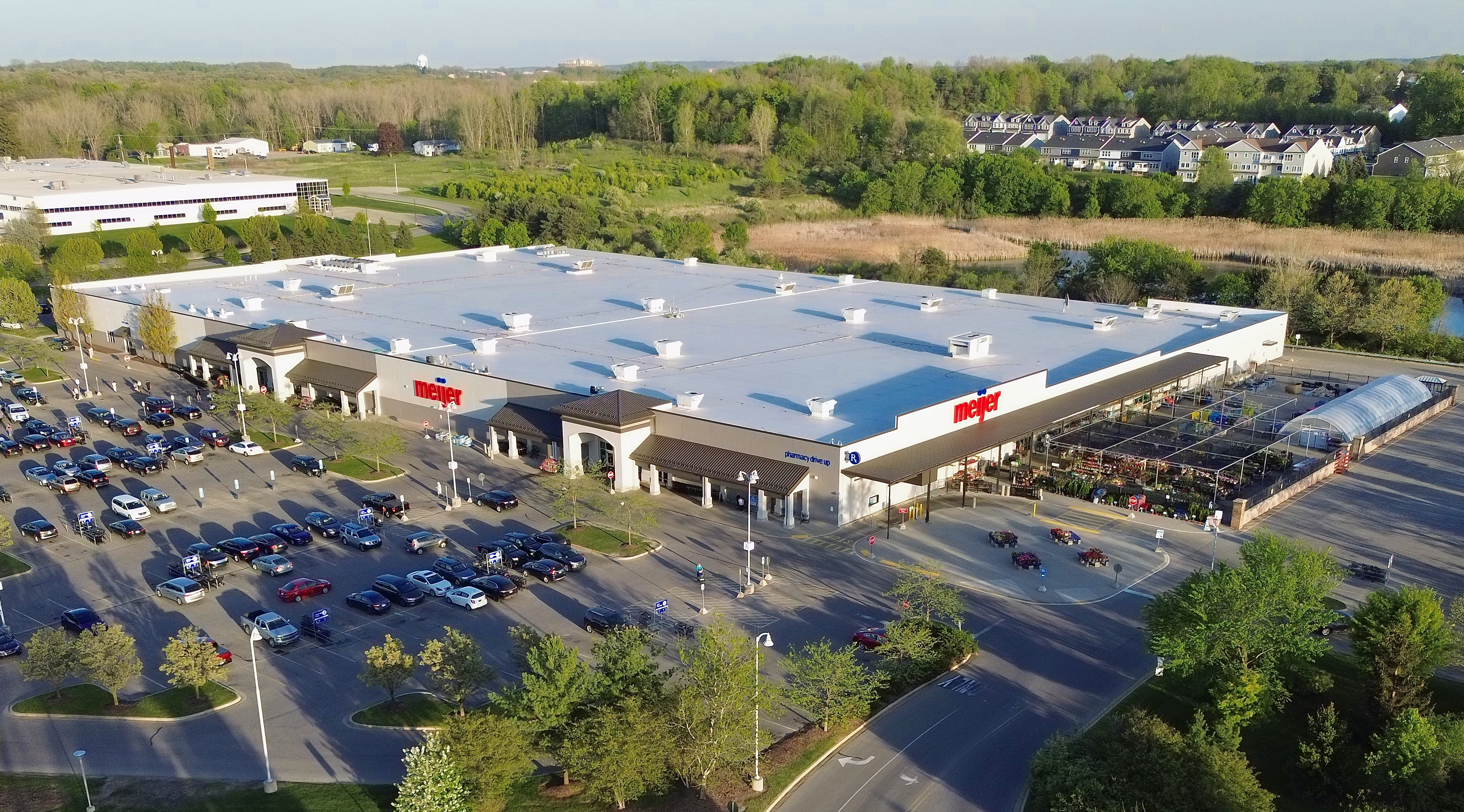
Meijer in Grandville, Michigan in 2025.

In 2017, Meijer expanded into the Upper Peninsula of Michigan and northern Wisconsin. The company opened locations in Howard, Wisconsin (near Green Bay), Escanaba, Michigan, and Sault Ste. Marie, Michigan in May 2017. Additional stores in Grand Chute, Wisconsin (in the Fox Cities area) and Marquette, Michigan followed in May 2018.

Meijer expanded into the Cleveland–Akron market in 2019, with stores in Stow, Mentor, and Avon. Meijer also expanded into the Youngstown area with a store in Boardman, Ohio, in 2020 as well as Austintown in 2025.

Meijer announced plans in 2022 to expand into the Greater St. Louis region, filing for approval to open a supercenter in Glen Carbon, Illinois. In January 2025, Meijer purchased land in O'Fallon, Illinois for a second store in the area. As of July 2025, construction has not started at either location.

In June 2024, Meijer was reported to be scouting the Western Pennsylvania region, including Pittsburgh, for a possible expansion, which would mark Meijer's entry into Pennsylvania. In September 2025, Meijer announced plans to expand into the region. It was announced in August 2026 that they will be constructing their first Pennsylvania store in Hermitage, PA.

In 2024, Meijer opened a store in Alliance, Ohio, on the site of the former Carnation City Mall, which had closed in 2022.

== Operations ==
=== Supercenters ===
As of September 2025, Meijer operates 259 hypermarkets, superstores that combine groceries and department goods. Roughly half of them are in Michigan, while others are in Illinois, Indiana, Kentucky, Ohio, and Wisconsin. Most Meijer stores are open daily from 6 a.m. to midnight. Previously, from 1988 until the COVID-19 pandemic in 2020, most Meijer stores were open 24 hours a day, 364 days a year, closed only on Christmas.

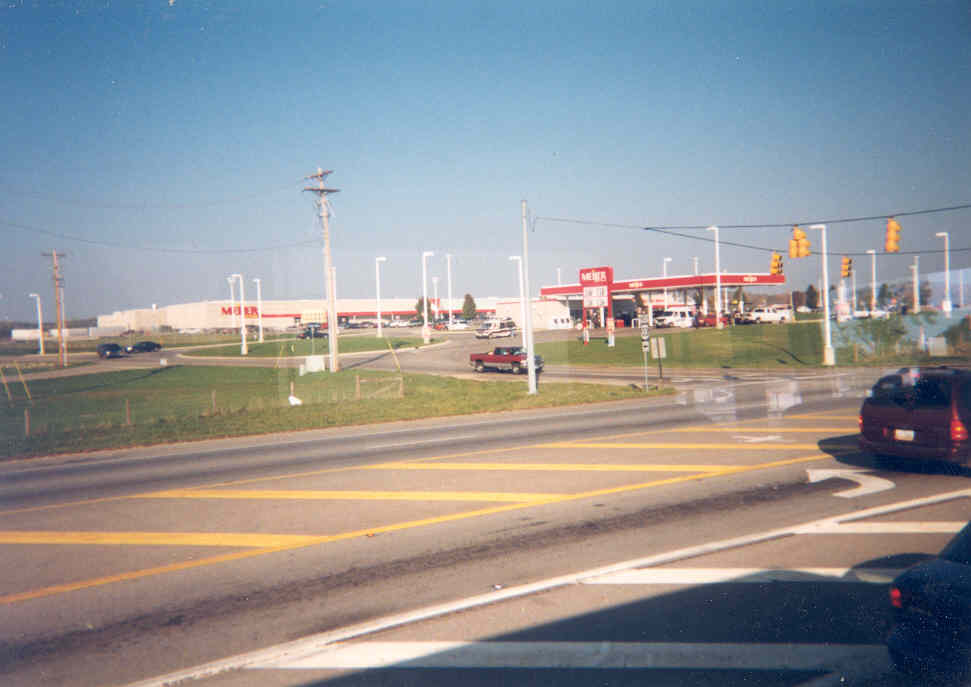
Meijer in Lancaster, Ohio in 2006.

Most locations also feature an adjacent Meijer Express fuel station and convenience store. Meijer Express fuel stations offer Top Tier-certified gasoline, diesel fuel, and alternative fuels such as E85. Some Meijer stores also feature electric vehicle charging stations.

=== Other Meijer-owned stores ===
In addition to the original Meijer supermarkets and hypermarkets, Meijer opened several concept stores in the 1970s and 1980s. The first were specialty clothing store chains called Copper Rivet, Sagebrush and Casual Court. Each store focused on a different form of brand-name clothing: Copper Rivet sold Levi's jeans, Sagebrush sold casual wear, and Casual Court sold women's clothing. All three chains usually operated in front of existing Meijer stores, or in nearby shopping centers. Casual Court was renamed Tansy in 1982. These clothing chains were dissolved in the 1980s as brand-name clothing became more readily available at competing retailers. Sagebrush, which at its peak comprised 71 stores, was sold off in 1988, while Copper Rivet and Tansy stores were closed as their leases expired.

In 1980, Meijer began a discount pharmacy chain called Spaar (from the Dutch word for "save"), which opened four stores in 1980 in former Meijer supermarket locations. The Spaar stores were sold to Pontiac, Michigan-based Perry Drug Stores by the mid-1980s.

One year after launching the Spaar brand, in 1981, Meijer began opening Meijer Square stores, which were traditional discount department stores lacking a full grocery section. Fourteen locations of Buffalo, New York-based Twin Fair, predominantly in southwestern Ohio, were bought and converted to the Meijer Square name. Two Meijer Square stores were also opened in Michigan. The Ohio locations were largely sold to Zayre and Hills. Meijer returned to Cincinnati and soon Kentucky in May 1996, after both Hills and Ames had closed all of their Ohio stores.

Meijer opened its first warehouse club store, SourceClub, in 1992. The concept proved unsuccessful in competition against Sam's Club and Costco, and all seven SourceClub stores were closed in 1994. The location in Fraser, Michigan was converted to a regular Meijer store, while the rest were shuttered or sold off.

=== Smaller-format stores ===
==== Meijer Marketplace ====
In 2009, Meijer announced a new store format called Meijer Marketplace, with 90,000–100,000-square-foot (8,400–9,300 m^{2}) stores focusing primarily on groceries. The format was tested with four locations in the Chicago suburbs, opening from 2010 to 2012, with plans for possible expansion into other regions. By 2017, three of the four stores had closed, though the location in Orland Park, Illinois remains in operation as of 2025.

==== Neighborhood markets ====
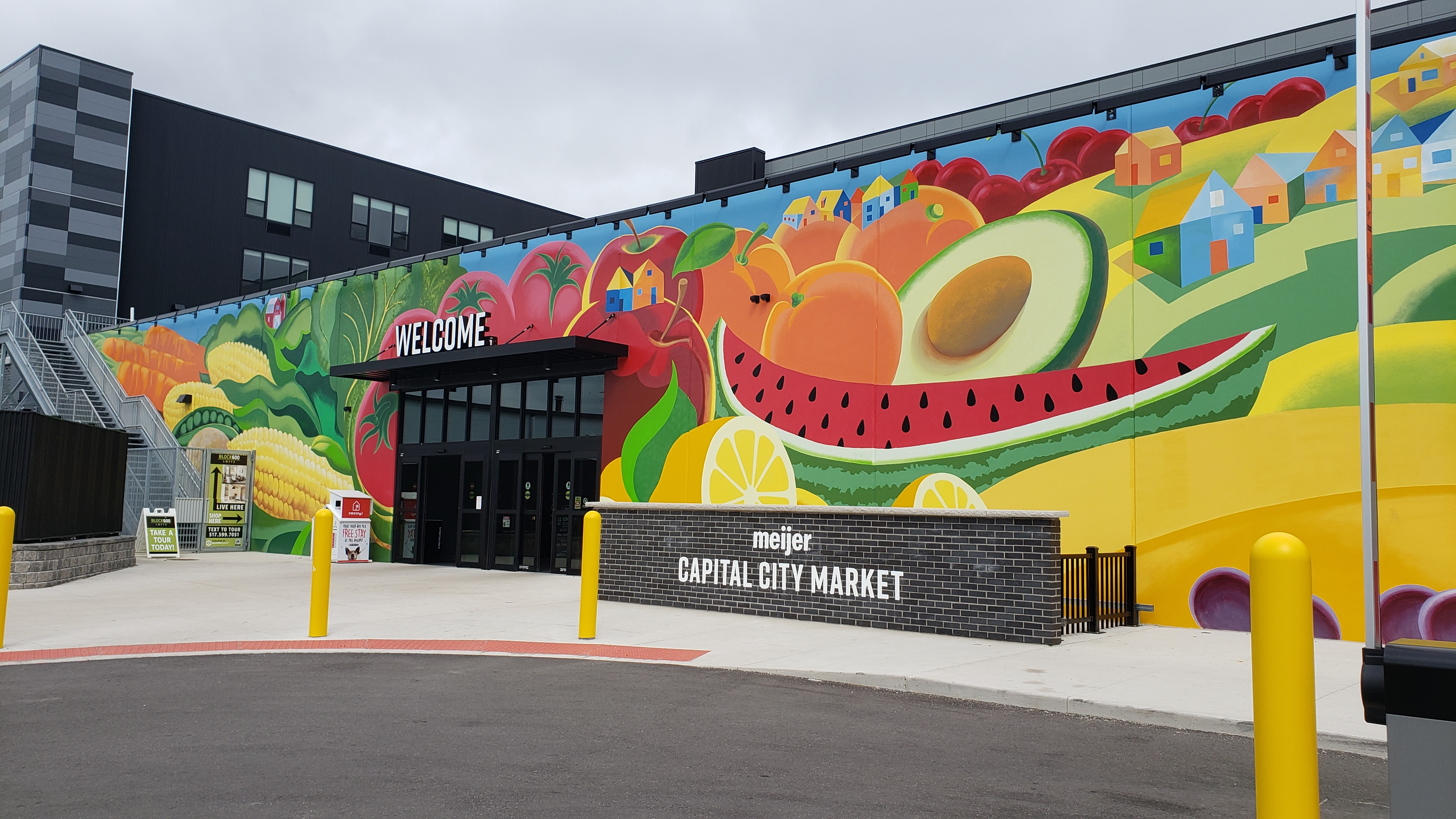
Capital City Market in Lansing in 2021.

Meijer operates six small-format "neighborhood" grocery stores, ranging in size from 35,000–50,000 square feet (3,300–4,600 m^{2}). The first, Bridge Street Market in Grand Rapids, opened in 2018. It was followed by Woodward Corner Market in Royal Oak, Michigan (opened in 2020); Capital City Market in Lansing (2020); Rivertown Market in Detroit (2021); Fairfax Market in Cleveland (2024); and Independence Market in Independence Township, Michigan (2025).

==== Meijer Grocery ====
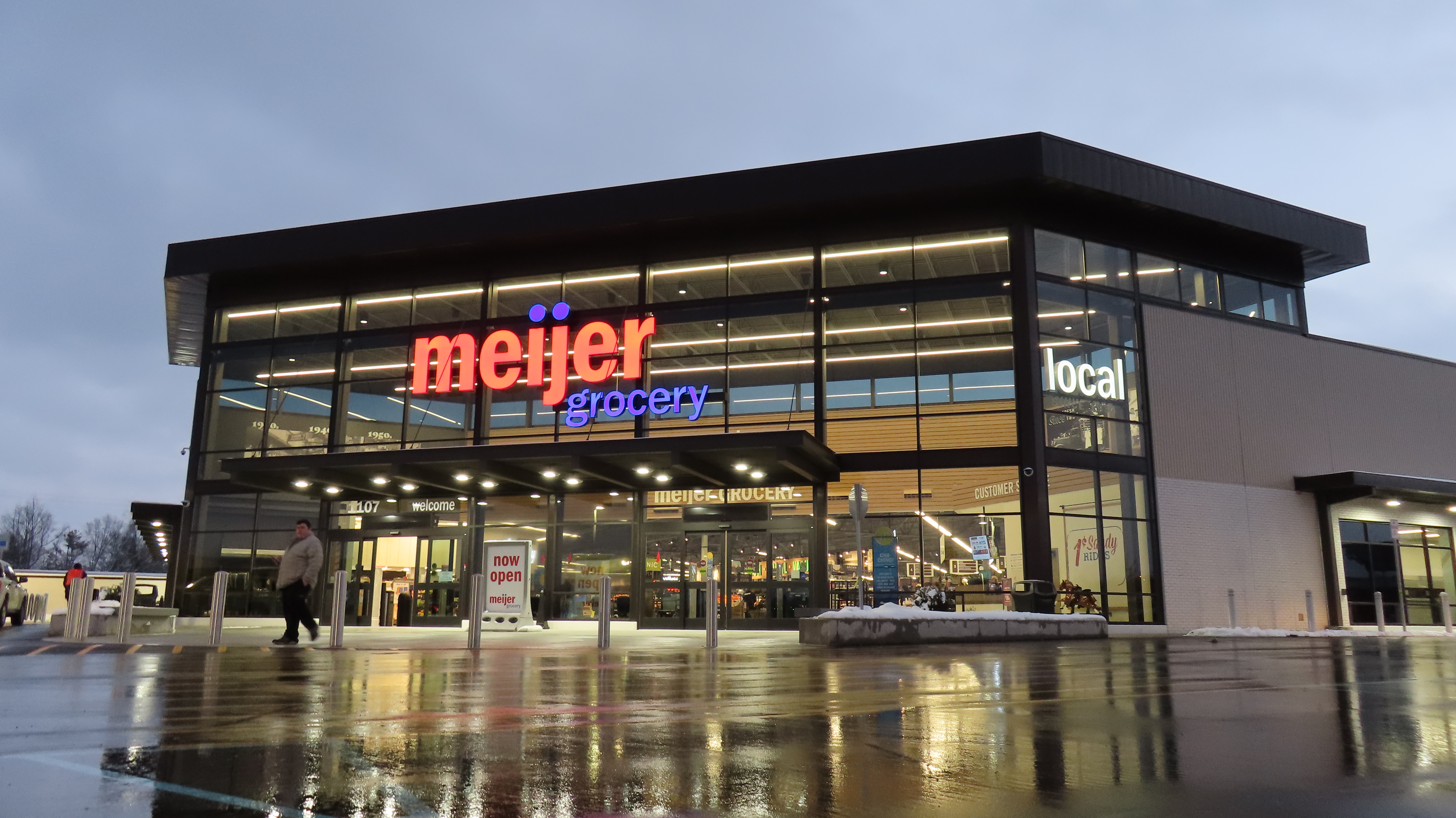
Meijer Grocery in Lake Orion, Michigan in 2023.

Introduced in 2023, Meijer Grocery is a standard grocery store, with stores ranging in size from 75,000–90,000 square feet (7,000–8,400 m^{2}). The first two locations, in Lake Orion and Macomb Township, Michigan, opened in January 2023. A third location opened in Noblesville, Indiana in July 2024, and two additional Detroit-area locations are under development as of 2025.

=== Fresh Thyme Market ===
Meijer was an early investor in Fresh Thyme Market, a regional grocery store chain in the Midwestern United States specializing in organic foods. Media sources conflict about the relationship between the two companies, with one describing Fresh Thyme as a wholly owned subsidiary of Meijer, and others reporting that Meijer only owned an equity stake.

Fresh Thyme had 70 stores across 10 Midwestern states as of January 2024.

=== Collective bargaining ===
Workers at many Meijer stores in Indiana, Kentucky, Michigan, and Ohio are unionized, represented by the United Food and Commercial Workers.

== Marketing and sponsorship ==
In 2006, Meijer donated to Calvin College in Grand Rapids, Michigan, to create the paid position called the Frederik Meijer Chair of Dutch Language and Culture. The previous chair was unpaid. Its purpose is to promote interest in the Netherlands and Michigan's Dutch cultural heritage. Meijer is the title sponsor of the Meijer LPGA Classic, an annual women's professional golf tournament held near Grand Rapids. Meijer is the official grocery sponsor of the Detroit Lions, Detroit Red Wings, and Detroit Tigers. Since the 2021–22 NHL season, Meijer's logo has been featured on the Red Wings' helmets; and since the 2023 MLB season, Meijer has advertised on the Tigers' jerseys. Meijer also owns the naming rights to the Lions' training center. Meijer has sponsored the Milwaukee Brewers since 2014. Meijer also sponsors the Cleveland Browns and Cleveland Guardians. Meijer is also a sponsor of the athletic teams of Michigan State University.

== Controversies and criticism ==
=== Alleged religious discrimination ===
In 2003, Meijer was sued by the U.S. Equal Employment Opportunity Commission, which alleged that the company engaged in religious discrimination and violated an employee's civil rights. Debra Kerkstra, a member of the Christian Reformed Church who worked at a West Michigan store, was fired in 2001 for refusing to work on a Sunday, despite communicating to her manager that her religious practices prevented her from doing so. Meijer settled the case in July 2003 after paying $22,000 to Kerkstra and agreeing to implement procedures to prevent repeat occurrences, such as training supervisors to avoid religious discrimination.

=== Attempted recall of local government officials ===
Meijer in Acme Township, Michigan, in 2026.

In February 2007, Meijer was involved in an effort to recall the elected officials of Acme Township, Michigan, because of the officials' reluctance to allow a new store along M-72 within the rural township east of Traverse City. Meijer retained Seyferth, Spaulding and Tennyson, a Grand Rapids-based public relations firm, to help orchestrate the recall effort.

Records indicate the PR firm retained by Meijer had arranged a meeting with a small nonprofit organization which favored the Meijer store, but had not yet formally taken a position on the recall. With the persuasion of the PR firm, the organization, known as the "Acme Taxpayers for Responsible Government", formed a recall committee and began to promote the recall election. Seyferth researched the plausibility of a recall, wrote justification for the recall and oversaw the agenda for the meeting with Acme Taxpayers. The PR firm revised the organization's website and logo, devised talking points and campaign literature, and wrote ghost letters to Traverse City newspapers. The recall committee did not disclose any of the PR firm's assistance, or its affiliation with Meijer. The company was fined $190,000 for its actions. The store eventually opened in November 2015, with thousands attending the long-awaited grand opening.

=== Treatment of LGBT community ===
Meijer scored 0% on the Human Rights Campaign's 2008 Corporate Equality Index, a measure of how U.S. companies treat gay, lesbian, bisexual and transgender employees, consumers and investors. Meijer was one of only three companies out of over 500 graded to receive a score of 0.

In 2009, Meijer's score began to increase after the company amended its nondiscrimination policy to include sexual orientation. Other retail and grocery rivals' scores are Macy's Inc. (100%), Sears Holdings Corporation (100%), Target Corporation (100%), Whole Foods Market (90%), Kroger (75%) and Walmart (40%). By 2016, Meijer had increased their score to 85%, having a similar score to its rivals.

In 2020, Meijer's score increased to a 100% on the Corporate Equality Index, as one of 680 major U.S. businesses to earn a perfect score that year. As of 2025, Meijer still maintains a score of 100% on the index.

=== Firing of a disabled employee ===
In March 2024, a Meijer manager in Seven Hills, Ohio had a disabled employee arrested for stealing $110 worth of food over a period of three months. After the body cam footage of the arrest leaked in August 2025, Meijer corporate has said it has made unspecified changes to their processes since the incident.
