= Meeza =

Egyptian financial organization

Meeza (ميزة)
- Logo of Meeza
- Type: Private
- Industry: Financial services
- Founded: 2019
- Headquarters: Cairo, Egypt
- Area served: Egypt
- Products: Debit cards, payment systems
- Owner: Egyptian Banks Company
- Website: meeza-eg.com

Meeza (Arabic: ميزة, lit. 'Feature') is an Egyptian electronic payment systems provider for domestic transactions within Egypt. It is supported by the Egyptian government and is regulated by the Egyptian Central Bank and the national Egyptian Banks Company (EBC). Meeza provides similar electronic payment services as MasterCard and Visa but can only be used locally inside Egypt.

== History ==
Meeza was established in early 2019, to provide a national payment scheme supporting a cashless society in Egypt. By the end of 2019, Meeza has issued about 4 million payment cards for use within the Egyptian network.

In October 2020, Meeza started offering free prepaid cards to Egyptians, which can be used locally and can not be used outside Egypt.

== Products and services ==
Meeza produces bank cards and mobile wallet applications for local transactions within Egypt. Meeza payment cards are accepted in merchandise stores and government organizations across Egypt, in addition to online Egyptian e-commerce websites. Meeza issues both prepaid payment cards and bank account debit cards. The cards are issued by most of the major banks in Egypt like National Bank of Egypt (NBE), Banque Misr, Alexbank, Banque du Caire, Commercial International Bank (CIB), and other Egyptian banks.

== See also ==
- Payment service provider
- E-commerce payment system
