= Frederik Meijer =

American businessman

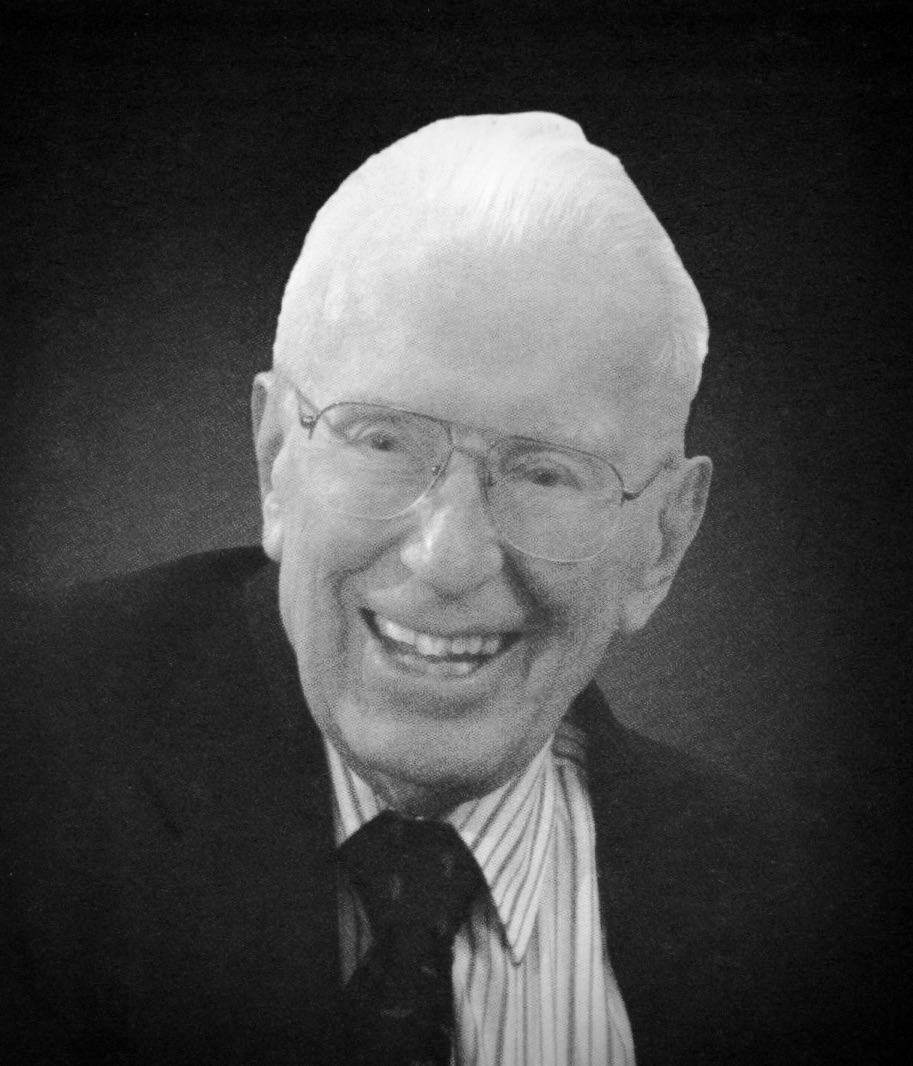
- Born: Frederik Gerhard Hendrik Meijer; December 7, 1919; Greenville, Michigan, U.S.
- Died: November 25, 2011 (aged 91); Grand Rapids, Michigan, U.S.
- Occupation: Businessman
- Title: Chairman, Meijer
- Spouse: Lena Rader (m. 1946)
- Children: Doug Meijer; Hank Meijer; Mark Meijer
- Parents: Hendrik Meijer (father); Gezina Mantel (mother)

Frederik Gerhard Hendrik "Fred" Meijer (December 7, 1919 – November 25, 2011) was an American billionaire businessman who was the chairman of the Meijer hypermarket chain, headquartered near his former hometown in Grand Rapids, Michigan.

== Early life ==
Meijer was born in Greenville, Michigan, the son of Gezina Mantel and Hendrik Meijer, Dutch immigrants who had married in Greenville in 1912. In 1934, at age 14, he worked with his father Hendrik to found Meijer's North Side Grocery in Greenville.

== Career ==
In 1962, he launched Meijer Thrifty Acres with his father and pioneered one-stop shopping. He inherited the company after the death of his father in 1964. In 1990, he handed over the company to his sons, Doug and Hank, although he remained the chairman of the board until his death.

As of September 2011, he was worth US$5 billion. He was the 60th richest person in the United States at the time of his death.

== Personal life ==
In 1946, he married Lena Rader (1919–2022), the daughter of farmers, who had been a cashier in one of his stores. They had three sons, Doug, Hank and Mark Meijer. His grandson Peter was the U.S. representative for Michigan's 3rd congressional district from 2021 to 2023. Meijer died on November 25, 2011, at the Spectrum Health System in Grand Rapids, Michigan, after suffering a stroke in his Grand Rapids home. His wife Lena died at 102 years old on January 15, 2022.

== Legacy ==
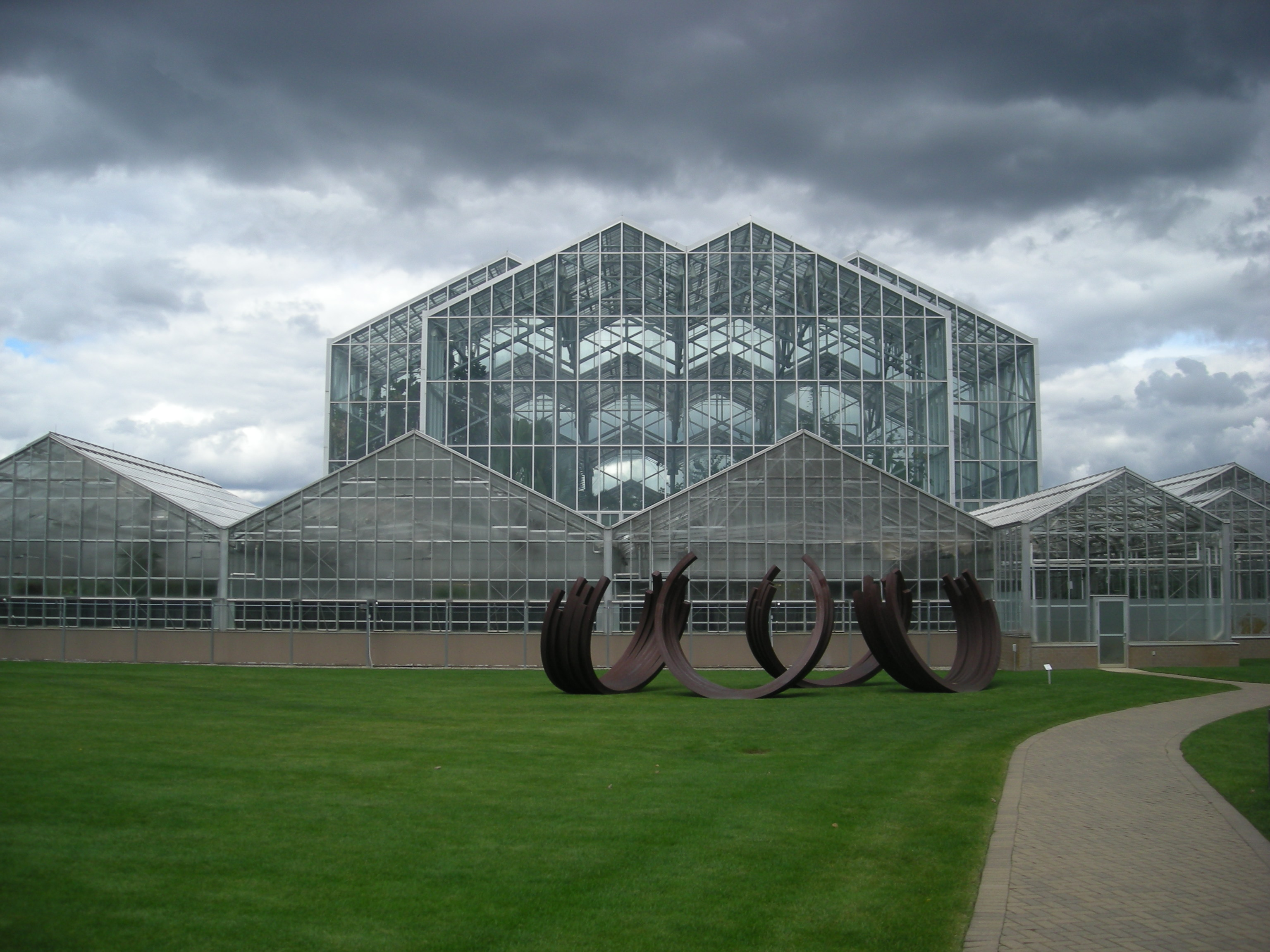
Frederik Meijer Gardens & Sculpture Park in Grand Rapids Charter Township, Michigan

Meijer helped establish the Frederik Meijer Gardens and Sculpture Park. An Honors College at Grand Valley State University is named for him. A Chair in Dutch culture at Calvin University is also named for him. The Frederik Meijer Trail in Kent County, Michigan, and the Fred Meijer White Pine Trail State Park are named after him following donations by the Frederik and Lena Meijer Foundation.
