= Joint account =

Shared bank account

A joint account is a bank account that has been opened by two or more individuals or entities. Joint accounts are commonly opened by close relatives (such as by a married couple) or by business partners in an unincorporated business, but they can be used in other circumstances.

Ordinarily, anyone can deposit funds into a joint account, but when opening an account the joint account holders may indicate to the financial institution whether a single account holder may make withdrawals or whether the consent of other account holders is required.

A joint account is not the same as adding an authorized signatory or additional cardholder to an account, that is, a person who is authorized by the account holder to make transactions on the account. Under this arrangement the primary account holder remains fully and solely liable for all transactions on the account. Accounts held by corporate entities are not, in themselves, joint accounts.

== Opening an account ==
When opening a joint bank account, the account holders need instruct the financial institution how and by whom the account is to be operated. They would decide the signatories on the account. For example, withdrawals may require any account holder to sign a withdrawal or all parties to sign the withdrawal or “any two account holders” to sign, or a particular account holder with any other account holder, or some other instructions.

Many jurisdictions allow unincorporated businesses (such as partnerships) to open a joint bank account under its business name, as distinct from the account being described by the full or partial names of the joint account holders. Proof of registration of the business name may be required.

Normally, a credit card account cannot be opened jointly. In the case of joint loan accounts, the account holders are jointly and severally liable for the outstanding debit balance of the account.

== Operation of a joint account ==
Normally, any person can deposit funds into a joint account, but withdrawals from the account must be made according to the instructions given when opening the account.

The joint account holders may authorise particular named individual/s to operate on the account. These individuals must be natural persons, and cannot be described by title (such as "treasurer" or "director") and any change of signatories must be promptly advised to the financial institution.

Any joint account holder can normally instruct the financial institution to put a freeze on the account, though all account holders would normally be required to act jointly to unfreeze the account.

== Rights of survivorship ==
One of the main issues relating to joint accounts are rights of survivorship, that is, if one of the joint account holders dies, whether the surviving account holder/s are entitled to the balance of the account.

Many husbands and wives open joint bank accounts as a cheap and easy way to avoid probate, and parent-child joint bank account holders may do the same. In some jurisdictions, passing funds in such situations may still be subject to gift duties and/or inheritance taxes.

== =In the United States=====Rights of survivorship ==
One of the main issues relating to joint accounts are rights of survivorship, that is, if one of the joint account holders dies, whether the surviving account holder/s are entitled to the balance of the account.

Many husbands and wives open joint bank accounts as a cheap and easy way to avoid probate, and parent-child joint bank account holders may do the same. In some jurisdictions, passing funds in such situations may still be subject to gift duties and/or inheritance taxes.

=== In the United States ===
In the United States, there are typically two types of joint accounts: survivorship accounts and convenience accounts. Any joint owner of the account may withdraw funds during the lifetime of both owners, and most states have statutes protecting the bank from claims brought by one joint owner against the bank if the other owner "wrongfully" withdraws funds from the joint account. The distinction between survivorship and convenience accounts matters at the death of one of the owners. If the joint account is a survivorship account, the ownership of the account goes to the surviving joint account holder. Joint survivorship accounts are often created in order to avoid probate. If two individuals open a joint account and one of them dies, the other person is entitled to the remaining balance and liable for the debt of that account.

If the account is a convenience account, if the person who placed the funds originally in the account dies, the joint owner does not become the owner of the account. Instead, the account becomes a probate asset of the deceased person. If the joint holder dies, who was simply put on the account for "convenience" purposes, the original owner of the account continues to own the account, unaffected by the death of the convenience account holder.

How to tell whether the account is a survivorship account or a convenience account will depend on the bank's account opening forms. The form will typically include a choice for designating the account as a joint account with right of survivorship ("JTWROS") or a joint account for convenience purposes.

A special type of joint account with right of survivorship, called a tenancy by the entireties account, is used for survivorship accounts between spouses. This special type of tenancy by the entireties account will typically offer the account holders protection from creditors under applicable state law. In the United States, there are typically two types of joint accounts: survivorship accounts and convenience accounts. Any joint owner of the account may withdraw funds during the lifetime of both owners, and most states have statutes protecting the bank from claims brought by one joint owner against the bank if the other owner "wrongfully" withdraws funds from the joint account. The distinction between survivorship and convenience accounts matters at the death of one of the owners. If the joint account is a survivorship account, the ownership of the account goes to the surviving joint account holder. Joint survivorship accounts are often created in order to avoid probate. If two individuals open a joint account and one of them dies, the other person is entitled to the remaining balance and liable for the debt of that account.

If the account is a convenience account, if the person who placed the funds originally in the account dies, the joint owner does not become the owner of the account. Instead, the account becomes a probate asset of the deceased person. If the joint holder dies, who was simply put on the account for "convenience" purposes, the original owner of the account continues to own the account, unaffected by the death of the convenience account holder.

How to tell whether the account is a survivorship account or a convenience account will depend on the bank's account opening forms. The form will typically include a choice for designating the account as a joint account with right of survivorship ("JTWROS") or a joint account for convenience purposes.

A special type of joint account with right of survivorship, called a tenancy by the entireties account, is used for survivorship accounts between spouses. This special type of tenancy by the entireties account will typically offer the account holders protection from creditors under applicable state law.

== See also ==
- Current account (banking)
- Transactional account
