= Hendrik Meijer =

Dutch-American businessman (1883–1964)

- Born: December 28, 1883; Hengelo, Netherlands
- Died: May 31, 1964 (aged 80); Grand Rapids, Michigan, US
- Occupation: Founder of Meijer
- Spouse: Gezina Mantel (m. 1912)
- Children: Frederik Meijer; Johanna Meijer

Hendrik Meijer (December 28, 1883 – May 31, 1964) was a Dutch businessman who founded the supercenter chain Meijer in the United States. He is the great-grandfather of former Republican Michigan congressman Peter Meijer.

== Early life ==
Meijer was born on December 28, 1883, in the town of Hengelo, Overijssel, in the eastern Netherlands. With the town being recently industrialized following the Industrial Revolution, his father worked under harsh conditions at a Stork B.V. mill. Beginning at the age of 12, Meijer worked at the mill himself, adopting anarchist and socialist views during this time. He began distributing pamphlets and posters in support of these ideologies and criticizing Dutch colonialism. Meijer later joined the Dutch military to avoid further factory work.

After leaving the military, he met Gezina Mantel, the daughter of anarchist and socialist organizers. He immigrated to the United States beside his parents and sister in 1907. Mantel wrote him often to ensure that Meijer remained active with anarchism and the teachings of social anarchist Ferdinand Domela Nieuwenhuis. Meijer first resided in Holland, Michigan, and was irritated by the conservative community and the Christian Reformed Church, immediately joining a socialist group upon arrival. The group, possibly called "Modern Sons of Marx", met on Sunday; the city and the Christian Reformed Church strictly believed Sundays were for the Sabbath and rest, though the group countered this by holding socialist meetings on Sunday.

Meijer left Holland and worked various jobs as a cloth salesman, chicken and dairy farm worker, and mill worker. In 1912, Mantel arrived in the United States and the two settled in Greenville, Michigan. The couple married on November 11, 1912, to commemorate the date anarchists were executed following the Haymarket affair. This same year, Meijer opened a barber shop in Greenville.

== Career ==
In 1934, Meijer entered the grocery business during the Great Depression in an unrented building he constructed beside his barbershop. At the time, he borrowed $338.76 to purchase goods for the unused space, believing that if they did not sell, his family could use them. With the help of his son Frederik, the two began to operate the grocery store.

As the founder and leader of his grocery chain, Meijer's leadership was at the forefront of the industry, instituting self-service shopping, the use of shopping carts and the use of conveyors on the check-out counter. Workers of Meijer unionized in 1951 and he began to share feelings of frustration with their organization. In 1962, Meijer and his son Frederik pioneered the superstore concept with the opening of Thrifty Acres in Grand Rapids, Michigan.

On May 31, 1964, Meijer died at the age of 80 and Frederik took his position as head of the supermarket chain. By the twenty-first century, the Meijer supermarket chain grew into one of the largest private companies and retail stores in the United States.

== Personal life ==
I tell them, that if an anarchist ... wants to get rid of someone with a crown on his head, the whole world wants to see him dead. But when that monster with the crown gets it into his head to kill thousands and thousands of people, then you are supposed to agree with him, because your country is telling you to.

— Hendrik Meijer

Meijer and his wife espoused anarchist and socialist views at a young age. The Meijer family were patriotic while in the United States, criticizing American policy when they saw appropriate. Throughout his life, Meijer held controversial political views that contrasted with the American public; he criticized World War I, condemned the arrest of Eugene V. Debs, described Adolf Hitler and Joseph Stalin as being two parts of the same thing, and denounced the red-baiting McCarthyism of Joseph McCarthy during the Second Red Scare in the 1950s. Meijer's household also did not smoke, did not drink alcohol, and advocated for the respect of all people regardless of race or social class. Meijer did not affiliate with organized religion. He instead focused on the overall morality of affairs occurring during his lifetime.

Such political beliefs were passed on to Meijer's son Frederik, with one teacher stating that Frederik defended anarchists in class, describing them as "peace-loving people who don't like unjust governments and who try to bring them down". His daughter Johanna Meijer would later leave her position at Meijer and work for civil rights and arms control groups. It is unknown if Meijer ever separated from his anarchist views.
