= Liesel Litzenburger =

American writer

- Born: Harbor Springs, Michigan, U.S.
- Education: University of Michigan
- Occupations: Novelist; short story writer; journalist
- Writing career
- Period: August 2006 – present
- Website: lieselonline.com

Liesel Litzenburger is a writer in Michigan. Her first novel, The Widower, was published in August 2006. Now You Love Me, a collection of short stories, was published in February 2007.
