= 1998 Michigan Senate election =

1998 Michigan Senate elections
- November 3, 1998

All 38 seats in the Michigan Senate 20 seats needed for a majority
- Turnout: 2,974,633 (41.45%)
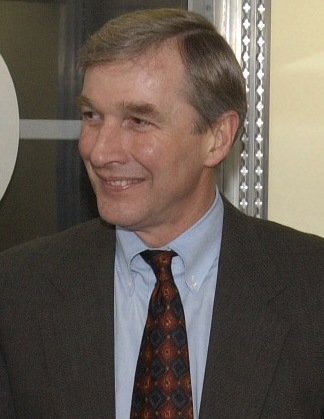

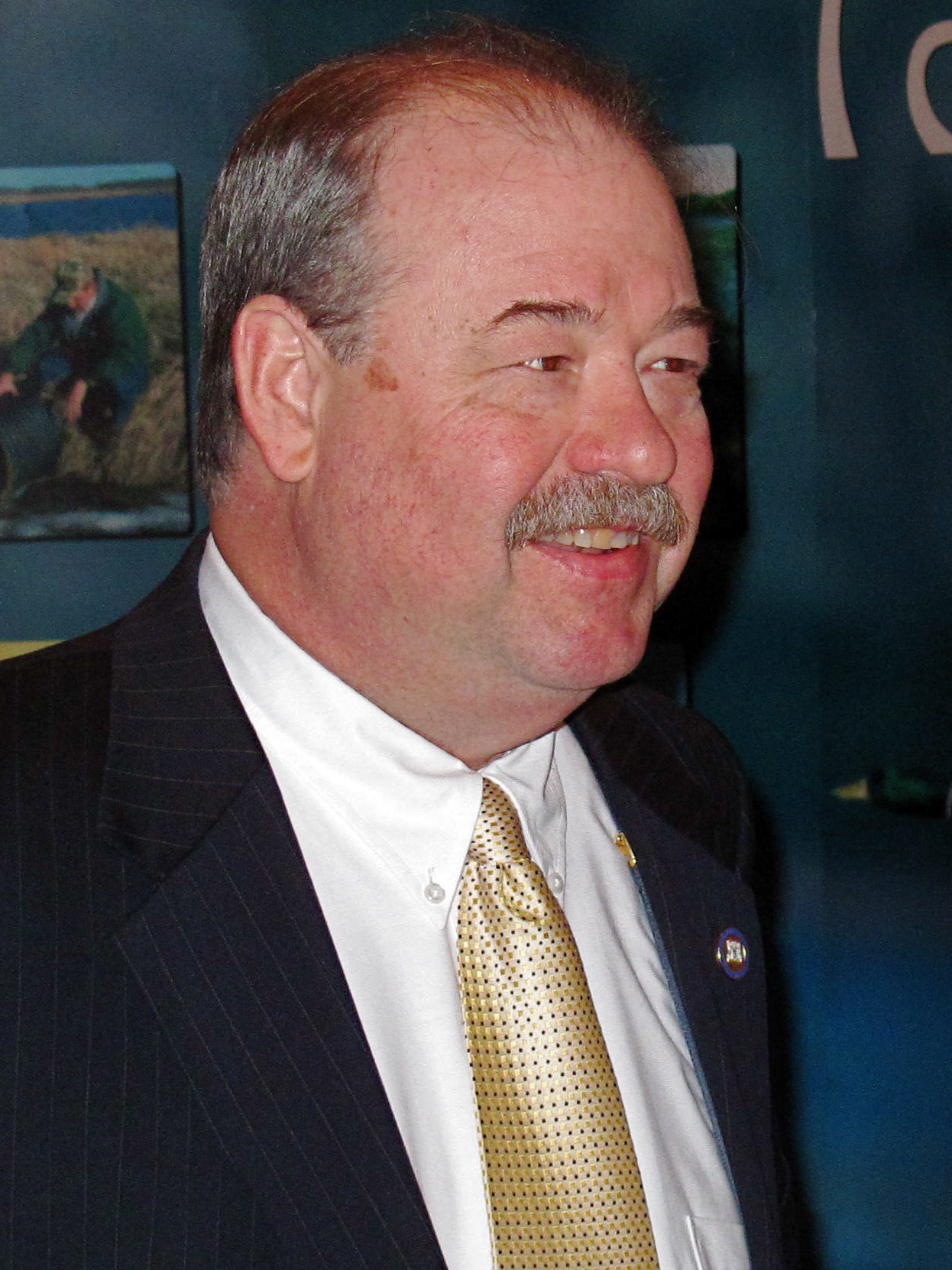
	Majority party	Minority party
Leader	Dick Posthumus (retired)	John D. Cherry
Party	Republican	Democratic
Leader since	January 1, 1991	1995
Leader's seat	31st - Alto	28th - Clio
Last election	22	16
Seats after	23	15
Seat change	▲1	▼1
Popular vote	1,556,712	1,388,711
Percentage	52.33%	46.69%
Majority Leader before election
Dick Posthumus
Republican
Elected Majority Leader
Dan DeGrow
Republican

The 1998 Michigan Senate election was held on November 3, 1998, to determine which party would control the Michigan Senate for the following two years in the 90th Michigan Legislature. All 38 senate seats were up for election. Prior to the election 22 seats were held by Republicans and 16 were held by Democrats. The general election saw the Republicans expand their majority by a single seat, thereby retaining control of the Michigan Senate. Primary elections were held on August 4, 1998.

== Retirements ==
1. District 9: R. Robert Geake (R) retired.
2. District 17: Jim Berryman (D) retired.
3. District 29: Joe Conroy (D) retired.
4. District 31: Dick Posthumus (R) retired to successfully run for lieutenant governor.
5. District 33: Jon Cisky (R) retired.

== Incumbents defeated ==
=== In primary ===
1. District 5: Michael O'Brien (D) lost renomination to Burton Leland.

== Results ==
=== District 1 ===
Michigan's 1st Senate district election, 1998
Party	Candidate	Votes	%
Democratic	Joseph F. Young Jr. (incumbent)	36,150	61.08%
Republican	Frank J. Palazzolo	21,656	36.59%
Libertarian	Constance J. Catalfio	1,378	2.33%
Total votes		59,184	100.0%
Democratic hold			

=== District 2 ===
Michigan's 2nd Senate district election, 1998
Party	Candidate	Votes	%
Democratic	Virgil C. Smith (incumbent)	42,832	92.17%
Republican	Wanda M. Gray	3,641	7.83%
Total votes		46,473	100.0%
Democratic hold			

=== District 3 ===
Michigan's 3rd Senate district election, 1998
Party	Candidate	Votes	%
Democratic	Raymond M. Murphy (incumbent)	42,976	94.71%
Republican	Erik Fiedler	2,402	5.29%
Total votes		45,378	100.0%
Democratic hold			

=== District 4 ===
Michigan's 4th Senate district election, 1998
Party	Candidate	Votes	%
Democratic	Jackie Vaughn III (incumbent)	57,458	96.50%
Republican	William Johnson	2,085	3.50%
Total votes		59,543	100.0%
Democratic hold			

=== District 5 ===
Michigan's 5th Senate district election, 1998
Party	Candidate	Votes	%
Democratic	Burton Leland	47,093	90.00%
Republican	Beverly Ann Beal	4,087	7.81%
Libertarian	Michael L. Donahue	1,143	2.18%
Total votes		52,323	100.0%
Democratic hold			

=== District 6 ===
Michigan's 6th Senate district election, 1998
Party	Candidate	Votes	%
Democratic	George Z. Hart (incumbent)	40,801	53.41%
Republican	Rhonda L. Runco	33,461	43.80%
Libertarian	Erich Trager	2,137	2.80%
Total votes		76,399	100.0%
Democratic hold			

=== District 7 ===
Michigan's 7th Senate district election, 1998
Party	Candidate	Votes	%
Democratic	Christopher D. Dingell (incumbent)	43,886	67.00%
Republican	Rick Butkowski	19,516	29.79%
Libertarian	Kristin K. Stoner	2,101	3.21%
Total votes		65,503	100.0%
Democratic hold			

=== District 8 ===
Michigan's 8th Senate district election, 1998
Party	Candidate	Votes	%
Republican	Loren N. Bennett (incumbent)	33,501	52.52%
Democratic	Kenneth A. Warfield	30,289	47.48%
Total votes		63,790	100.0%
Republican hold			

=== District 9 ===
Michigan's 9th Senate district election, 1998
Party	Candidate	Votes	%
Republican	Thaddeus McCotter	53,396	61.85%
Democratic	Carol Poenisch	29,548	34.23%
Libertarian	David A. Nagy	3,385	3.92%
Total votes		86,329	100.0%
Republican hold			

=== District 10 ===
Michigan's 10th Senate district election, 1998
Party	Candidate	Votes	%
Democratic	Art Miller Jr. (incumbent)	44,916	65.35%
Republican	Linda R. Goff	21,971	31.97%
Libertarian	David A. Nagy	1,841	2.68%
Total votes		68,728	100.0%
Democratic hold			

=== District 11 ===
Michigan's 11th Senate district election, 1998
Party	Candidate	Votes	%
Democratic	Ken DeBeaussaert (incumbent)	41,890	50.74%
Republican	Jack Brandenburg	38,588	46.74%
Libertarian	Scott W. Allen	2,086	2.53%
Total votes		82,564	100.0%
Democratic hold			

=== District 12 ===
Michigan's 12th Senate district election, 1998
Party	Candidate	Votes	%
Republican	David Jaye (incumbent)	54,116	61.89%
Democratic	Dick Kennedy	31,339	35.84%
Libertarian	Paul M. Soyk	1,983	2.27%
Total votes		87,438	100.0%
Republican hold			

=== District 13 ===
Michigan's 13th Senate district election, 1998
Party	Candidate	Votes	%
Republican	Mike Bouchard (incumbent)	57,752	64.37%
Democratic	Jeffrey Jenks	29,411	32.78%
Libertarian	Gary Atkinson	2,550	2.84%
Total votes		89,713	100.0%
Republican hold			

=== District 14 ===
Michigan's 14th Senate district election, 1998
Party	Candidate	Votes	%
Democratic	Gary Peters (incumbent)	53,497	65.48%
Republican	Mike Christie Jr.	28,201	34.52%
Total votes		81,698	100.0%
Democratic hold			

=== District 15 ===
Michigan's 15th Senate district election, 1998
Party	Candidate	Votes	%
Republican	Bill Bullard Jr. (incumbent)	62,847	61.46%
Democratic	S. Ruth Fuller	39,414	38.54%
Total votes		102,261	100.0%
Republican hold			

=== District 16 ===
Michigan's 16th Senate district election, 1998
Party	Candidate	Votes	%
Republican	Mat J. Dunaskiss (incumbent)	68,366	69.11%
Democratic	Michael L. Odette	30,563	30.89%
Total votes		98,929	100.0%
Republican hold			

=== District 17 ===
Michigan's 17th Senate district election, 1998
Party	Candidate	Votes	%
Republican	Beverly S. Hammerstrom	41,859	54.21%
Democratic	Lynn Owen	35,353	45.79%
Total votes		77,212	100.0%
Republican gain from Democratic			

=== District 18 ===
Michigan's 18th Senate district election, 1998
Party	Candidate	Votes	%
Democratic	Alma Wheeler Smith (incumbent)	53,024	62.21%
Republican	John C. Hochstetler	32,211	37.79%
Total votes		85,235	100.0%
Democratic hold			

=== District 19 ===
Michigan's 19th Senate district election, 1998
Party	Candidate	Votes	%
Republican	Philip E. Hoffman (incumbent)	47,714	69.77%
Democratic	Jennie Crittendon	20,675	30.23%
Total votes		68,389	100.0%
Republican hold			

=== District 20 ===
Michigan's 20th Senate district election, 1998
Party	Candidate	Votes	%
Republican	Harry Gast (incumbent)	44,362	67.20%
Democratic	David Allen DeRuiter	20,244	30.66%
Libertarian	Tom Baker	1,413	2.14%
Total votes		66,019	100.0%
Republican hold			

=== District 21 ===
Michigan's 21st Senate district election, 1998
Party	Candidate	Votes	%
Republican	Dale L. Shugars (incumbent)	38,349	53.59%
Democratic	Kristi Carambula	33,207	46.41%
Total votes		71,556	100.0%
Republican hold			

=== District 22 ===
Michigan's 22nd Senate district election, 1998
Party	Candidate	Votes	%
Republican	William Van Regenmorter (incumbent)	69,986	78.57%
Democratic	Melvin Jay Lewis	19,092	21.43%
Total votes		89,078	100.0%
Republican hold			

=== District 23 ===
Michigan's 23rd Senate district election, 1998
Party	Candidate	Votes	%
Republican	Joanne G. Emmons (incumbent)	50,995	68.46%
Democratic	Louis Gula	21,743	29.19%
Libertarian	Richard Whitelock	1,750	2.35%
Total votes		74,488	100.0%
Republican hold			

=== District 24 ===
Michigan's 24th Senate district election, 1998
Party	Candidate	Votes	%
Republican	Joe Schwarz (incumbent)	53,361	65.59%
Democratic	Violet Hinton	27,990	34.41%
Total votes		81,351	100.0%
Republican hold			

=== District 25 ===
Michigan's 25th Senate district election, 1998
Party	Candidate	Votes	%
Democratic	Dianne Byrum (incumbent)	55,200	66.04%
Republican	Pat Gallagher	25,816	30.89%
Libertarian	Mark Owen	2,568	3.07%
Total votes		83,584	100.0%
Democratic hold			

=== District 26 ===
Michigan's 26th Senate district election, 1998
Party	Candidate	Votes	%
Republican	Mike Rogers (incumbent)	66,144	68.17%
Democratic	Sylvia McCollough	28,784	29.67%
Libertarian	Richard A. Samul	2,099	2.16%
Total votes		97,027	100.0%
Republican hold			

=== District 27 ===
Michigan's 27th Senate district election, 1998
Party	Candidate	Votes	%
Republican	Dan DeGrow (incumbent)	58,413	65.83%
Democratic	Dan Bewersdorff	30,315	34.17%
Total votes		88,728	100.0%
Republican hold			

=== District 28 ===
Michigan's 28th Senate district election, 1998
Party	Candidate	Votes	%
Democratic	John D. Cherry (incumbent)	48,249	64.08%
Republican	Jodi Ann Spalding	25,513	33.89%
Libertarian	David C. Jackson	1,530	2.03%
Total votes		75,292	100.0%
Democratic hold			

=== District 29 ===
Michigan's 29th Senate district election, 1998
Party	Candidate	Votes	%
Democratic	Robert L. Emerson	53,673	72.39%
Republican	Mercedes Kinnee	20,472	27.61%
Total votes		74,145	100.0%
Democratic hold			

=== District 30 ===
Michigan's 30th Senate district election, 1998
Party	Candidate	Votes	%
Republican	Glenn Steil Sr. (incumbent)	47,499	62.48%
Democratic	Carol Hennessy	28,525	37.52%
Total votes		76,024	100.0%
Republican hold			

=== District 31 ===
Michigan's 31st Senate district election, 1998
Party	Candidate	Votes	%
Republican	Ken Sikkema	77,949	79.93%
Democratic	Jason Robert May	19,577	20.07%
Total votes		97,526	100.0%
Republican hold			

=== District 32 ===
Michigan's 32nd Senate district election, 1998
Party	Candidate	Votes	%
Republican	Leon Stille (incumbent)	57,363	67.21%
Democratic	Greg Woodbury	27,989	32.79%
Total votes		85,352	100.0%
Republican hold			

=== District 33 ===
Michigan's 33rd Senate district election, 1998
Party	Candidate	Votes	%
Republican	Michael Goschka	45,764	56.39%
Democratic	Barbara J. McDonald	35,390	43.61%
Total votes		81,154	100.0%
Republican hold			

=== District 34 ===
Michigan's 34th Senate district election, 1998
Party	Candidate	Votes	%
Republican	Joel Gougeon (incumbent)	47,404	58.18%
Democratic	Tom Alley	34,073	41.82%
Total votes		81,477	100.0%
Republican hold			

=== District 35 ===
Michigan's 35th Senate district election, 1998
Party	Candidate	Votes	%
Republican	Bill Schuette (incumbent)	61,510	70.37%
Democratic	Brian Baldwin	25,900	29.63%
Total votes		87,410	100.0%
Republican hold			

=== District 36 ===
Michigan's 36th Senate district election, 1998
Party	Candidate	Votes	%
Republican	George A. McManus Jr. (incumbent)	65,415	65.42%
Democratic	Joel R. Casler	34,576	34.58%
Total votes		99,991	100.0%
Republican hold			

=== District 37 ===
Michigan's 37th Senate district election, 1998
Party	Candidate	Votes	%
Republican	Walter H. North (incumbent)	55,143	62.31%
Democratic	Kay Ann Chase	33,352	37.69%
Total votes		88,495	100.0%
Republican hold			

=== District 38 ===
Michigan's 38th Senate district election, 1998
Party	Candidate	Votes	%
Democratic	Don Koivisto (incumbent)	59,717	75.74%
Republican	Patricia Jean Ashcraft	17,884	22.68%
Libertarian	Charles Gershfield	1,246	1.58%
Total votes		78,847	100.0%
Democratic hold			

== See also ==
- 1998 Michigan House of Representatives election
