= 2002 Michigan Senate election =

2002 Michigan Senate elections
- November 5, 2002

38 seats in the Michigan Senate 20 seats needed for a majority

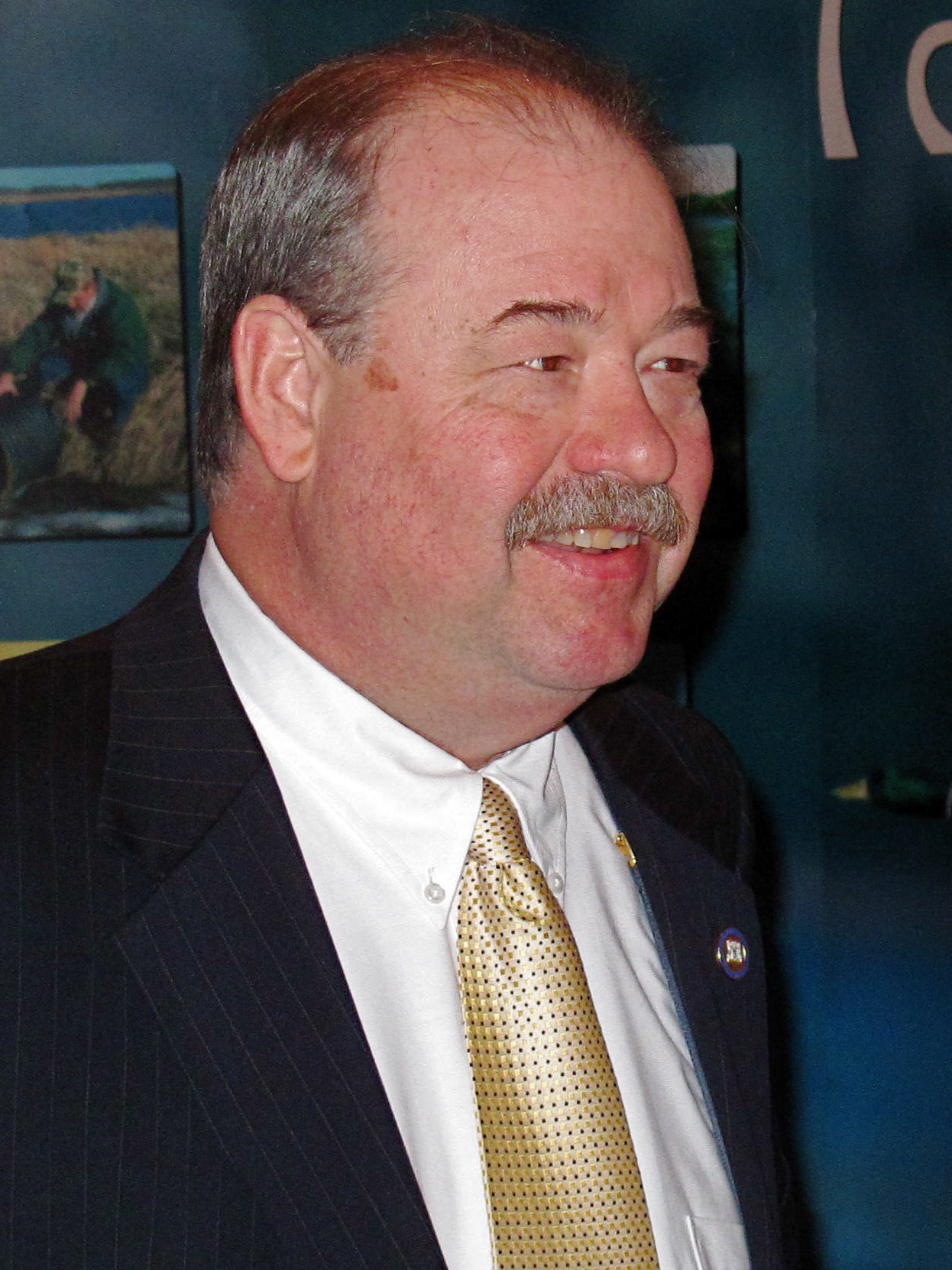
	Majority party	Minority party
Leader	Dan DeGrow (retiring)	John D. Cherry (retiring)
Party	Republican	Democratic
Leader since	1999	1995
Leader's seat	27th district	28th district
Last election	23	15
Seats after	22	16
Seat change	▼1	▲1
Popular vote	1,532,170	1,506,920
Percentage	50.07%	49.24%
- Results: Republican gain Democratic gain Republican hold Democratic hold
Majority Leader before election
Dan DeGrow
Republican
Elected Majority Leader
Ken Sikkema
Republican

The 2002 Michigan Senate elections were held November 5, 2002, with partisan primaries to select the parties' nominees in the various districts on August 6, 2002.

== Predictions ==
Source	Ranking	As of
The Cook; Political Report	Lean R	October 4, 2002

== Results ==
=== Districts 1-9 ===
1st District (Wayne (south and east Detroit, Grosse Pointe Park))
Party	Candidate	Votes	%
Democratic	Hansen Clarke	47,679	93.66
Republican	Cynthia Cassell	3,226	6.34
Total votes		50,905	100.0
Democratic hold			

2nd District (Wayne (Grosse Pointe Park, Grosse Pointe, Grosse Pointe Farms, Grosse Pointe Township))
Party	Candidate	Votes	%
Democratic	Martha Scott (incumbent)	40,087	67.96
Republican	Jeffrey Schroder	18,899	32.04
Total votes		58,986	100.0
Democratic hold			

3rd District (Wayne (west Detroit; excluding northwest, southwest and far east Dearborn; Melvindale; River Rouge))
Party	Candidate	Votes	%
Democratic	Irma Clark-Coleman	53,395	80.6
Republican	Jose Hernandez	12,855	19.4
Total votes		66,250	100.0
Democratic hold			

4th District (Wayne (northwest and west Detroit, northeast Dearborn Heights))
Party	Candidate	Votes	%
Democratic	Buzz Thomas	53,614	95.71
Republican	Karen Mastney	2,404	4.29
Total votes		56,018	100.0
Democratic hold			

5th District (Wayne (excluding northeast and southeast Dearborn Heights, excluding east Dearborn, Inkster))
Party	Candidate	Votes	%
Democratic	Burton Leland (incumbent)	49,780	82.81
Republican	Bonnie Patrick	10,334	17.19
Total votes		60,114	100.0
Democratic hold			

6th District (Wayne (Livonia, Redford Township, Westland, Garden City))
Party	Candidate	Votes	%
Republican	Laura M. Toy	46,257	54.16
Democratic	Eileen DeHart	39,152	45.84
Total votes		85,409	100.0
Republican gain from Democratic			

7th District (Wayne (Northville-excluding portion outside county, Northville Township, Plymouth, Canton Township, Van Buren Township, Belleville, Sumpter Township, Huron Township, Brownstown Township, Flat Rock, Woodhaven, Trenton, Grosse Ile Township, Gibraltar, Rockwood))
Party	Candidate	Votes	%
Republican	Bruce Patterson	52,435	56.32
Democratic	George Mans	40,675	43.68
Total votes		93,110	100.0
Republican gain from Democratic			

8th District (Wayne (Wayne, Romulus, Taylor, Allen Park, Melvindale, Lincoln Park, Ecorse, Southgate, Wyandotte, Riverview))
Party	Candidate	Votes	%
Democratic	Raymond Basham	43,874	64.22
Republican	Pamela Sharron Montelauro	22,128	32.39
Libertarian	Bruce David Morse	2,312	3.38
Total votes		68,314	100.0
Democratic gain from Republican			

9th District (Macomb (Fraser, Warren, Center Line, Eastpointe, St. Clair Shores))
Party	Candidate	Votes	%
Democratic	Dennis Olshove	47,609	60.82
Republican	Cecelia Stevens	28,588	36.52
Libertarian	Keith Edwards	2,085	2.66
Total votes		78,282	100.0
Democratic gain from Republican			

=== Districts 10-19 ===
10th District (Macomb (Sterling Heights, Utica, Clinton Township, Roseville))
Party	Candidate	Votes	%
Democratic	Michael Switalski	42,822	53.06
Republican	Steve Rice	36,424	45.13
Libertarian	Scott Allen	1,462	1.81
Total votes		80,708	100.0
Democratic hold			

11th District (Macomb (all municipalities north of [and excluding] Utica, Sterling Heights and Clinton Township; Harrison Township; Mount Clemens))
Party	Candidate	Votes	%
Republican	Alan Sanborn	55,859	67.94
Democratic	Jim Ayres	26,365	32.06
Total votes		82,224	100.0
Republican gain from Democratic			

12th District (Oakland (Oxford Township, Addison Township, Independence Township, Clarkston, Orion Township, Oakland Township, Lake Angelus, Rochester, Rochester Hills, Auburn Hills, Pontiac, Sylvan Lake, Keego Harbor))
Party	Candidate	Votes	%
Republican	Mike Bishop	54,569	62.74
Democratic	Thomas Werth	32,412	37.26
Total votes		86,981	100.0
Republican hold			

13th District (Oakland (Troy, Bloomfield Hills, Bloomfield Township, Clawson, Royal Oak, Madison Heights, Berkley))
Party	Candidate	Votes	%
Republican	Shirley Johnson (incumbent)	63,793	63.15
Democratic	Colleen Levitt	37,222	36.85
Libertarian	Eric Gordon	0	
Total votes		101,015	100.0
Republican hold			

14th District (Oakland (Farmington Hills, Farmington, Southfield Township, Lathrup Village, Southfield, Oak Park, Oak Park, Huntington Woods, Pleasant Ridge, Hazel Park, Ferndale, Royal Oak Township))
Party	Candidate	Votes	%
Democratic	Gilda Jacobs	65,538	68.4
Republican	Marc Wilkins	28,249	29.48
Libertarian	Lloyd Sherman	2,030	2.12
Total votes		95,817	100.0
Democratic hold			

15th District (Oakland (Holly Township, Rose Township, Highland Township, White Lake Township, Milford Township, Commerce Township, Walled Lake, West Bloomfield Township, Orchard Lake, Wixom, Lyon Township, South Lyon, Novi, Novi Township, Northville-excluding portion outside county))
Party	Candidate	Votes	%
Republican	Nancy Cassis	57,583	60.47
Democratic	Sean Carlson	35,305	37.07
Constitution	Sean Patrick Sullivan	2,340	2.46
Total votes		95,228	100.0
Republican hold			

16th District (St. Joseph, Branch, Hillsdale, Lenawee)
Party	Candidate	Votes	%
Republican	Cameron Brown	39,894	60.91
Democratic	Dudley Spade	25,604	39.09
Total votes		65,498	100.0
Republican hold			

17th District (Jackson (Grass Lake Township, Leoni Township, Norvell Township, Summit Township), Monroe, Washtenaw (Bridgewater Township, Lodi Township, Manchester Township, most of Pittsfield Township, most of Milan, Saline, Saline Township, York Township))
Party	Candidate	Votes	%
Republican	Beverly Hammerstrom	44,773	59.67
Democratic	Sharon Lemasters	30,262	40.33
Total votes		75,035	100.0
Republican hold			

18th District (Washtenaw (Ann Arbor, Ann Arbor Township, Augusta Township, Dexter Township, Freedom Township, Lima Township, Lyndon Township, Northfield Township, small part of Pittsfield Township, Salem Township, Scio Township, Sharon Township, Superior Township, Sylvan Township, Webster Township, Ypsilanti, Ypsilanti Township))
Party	Candidate	Votes	%
Democratic	Liz Brater	52,912	63.54
Republican	Gordon Darr	27,726	33.3
Green	Elliott Smith	2,635	3.16
Total votes		83,273	100.0
Democratic hold			

19th District (Calhoun, Jackson (excluding Summit Township, Leoni Township, Grass Lake Township, Norvell Township))
Party	Candidate	Votes	%
Democratic	Mark Schauer	39,673	55.14
Republican	Mickey Mortimer	32,281	44.86
Total votes		71,954	100.0
Democratic gain from Republican			

=== Districts 20-29 ===
20th District (Kalamazoo, Van Buren (Antwerp Township, Paw Paw Township))
Party	Candidate	Votes	%
Republican	Tom George	44,642	56.53
Democratic	Ed LaForge	34,327	43.47
Total votes		78,969	100.0
Republican hold			

21st District (Berrien, Cass, Van Buren (excluding Paw Paw Township, Antwerp Township))
Party	Candidate	Votes	%
Republican	Ron Jelinek	43,239	64.81
Democratic	Art Toy	23,473	35.19
Total votes		66,712	100.0
Republican hold			

22nd District (Ingham (Bunker Hill Township, Leslie, Leslie Township, Mason, Stockbridge Township, Vevay Township), Livingston, Shiawassee)
Party	Candidate	Votes	%
Republican	Valde Garcia	59,853	68.23
Democratic	Jim Swonk	27,866	31.77
Total votes		87,719	100.0
Republican hold			

23rd District (Ingham (Alaiedon Township, Aurelius Township, Delhi Charter Township, East Lansing—excluding portion outside county, Lansing—excluding portion outside county, Leroy Township, Locke Township, Meridian Township, Onondaga Township, Wheatfield Township, White Oak Township, Williamston, Williamston Township))
Party	Candidate	Votes	%
Democratic	Virg Bernero (incumbent)	44,136	53.36
Republican	Paul DeWeese	38,581	46.64
Total votes		82,717	100.0
Democratic gain from Republican			

24th District (Allegan, Barry, Eaton)
Party	Candidate	Votes	%
Republican	Patricia Birkholz	57,906	64.29
Democratic	Tami Bridson	32,170	35.71
Total votes		90,076	100.0
Republican hold			

25th District (Lapeer, St. Clair)
Party	Candidate	Votes	%
Republican	Jud Gilbert	43,806	55.93
Democratic	Thomas Hamilton	34,517	44.07
Total votes		78,323	100.0
Republican gain from Democratic			

26th District (Genesee (Atlas Township, Burton, Clio, Davison, Davison Township, Forest Township, Grand Blanc, Grand Blanc Township, Mount Morris, Mount Morris Township, Richfield Township, Thetford Township, Vienna Township), Oakland (Brandon Township, Groveland Township, Springfield Township, Waterford Township))
Party	Candidate	Votes	%
Democratic	Deborah Cherry	47,878	55.85
Republican	John Muller	37,852	44.15
Total votes		85,730	100.0
Democratic gain from Republican			

27th District (Genesee (Argentine Township, Clayton Township, Fenton, Fenton Township, Flint, Flint Township, Flushing, Flushing Township, Gaines Township, Genesee Township, Linden, Montrose Township, Mandy Township, Swartz Creek))
Party	Candidate	Votes	%
Democratic	Robert Emerson	52,019	66.08
Republican	Cynthia O'Lear	26,699	33.92
Total votes		78,718	100.0
Democratic gain from Republican			

28th District (Kent (Ada Township, Algoma Township, Alpine Township, Bowne Township, Byron Township, Caledonia Township, Cannon Township, Cedar Springs, Courtland Township, East Grand Rapids, Gaines Township, Grand Rapids Township, Nelson Township, Oakfield Township, Plainfield Township, Rockford, Solon Township, Spencer Township, Tyrone Township, Walker, Wyoming))
Party	Candidate	Votes	%
Republican	Ken Sikkema	72,993	73.15
Democratic	Michelle Berry	25,425	25.48
Libertarian	Ron Heeren	1,373	1.38
Total votes		99,791	100.0
Republican gain from Democratic			

29th District (Kent (Cascade Township, Grand Rapids, Grattan Township, Kentwood, Lowell, Lowell Township, Vergennes Township))
Party	Candidate	Votes	%
Republican	Bill Hardiman	44,202	53.82
Democratic	Steve Pestka	36,746	44.74
Libertarian	Warren Adams	1,178	1.43
Total votes		82,126	100.0
Republican gain from Democratic			

=== Districts 30-38 ===
30th District (Ottawa, Kent (Grandville, Sparta Township))
Party	Candidate	Votes	%
Republican	Wayne Kuipers	71,160	75.3
Democratic	John O'Brien	21,701	22.96
Libertarian	Lynne Bradley-Horan	1,637	1.73
Total votes		94,498	100.0
Republican hold			

31st District (Arenac, Bay, Huron, Sanilac, Tuscola)
Party	Candidate	Votes	%
Democratic	Jim Barcia	54,352	60.5
Republican	Mike Green	35,486	39.5
Total votes		89,838	100.0
Democratic gain from Republican			

32nd District (Gratiot, Saginaw)
Party	Candidate	Votes	%
Republican	Mike Goschka	45,338	54.62
Democratic	Mike Hanley	37,668	45.38
Total votes		83,006	100.0
Republican hold			

33rd District (Clinton, Ionia, Isabella, Montcalm)
Party	Candidate	Votes	%
Republican	Alan Cropsey	45,487	62.93
Democratic	Mark Munsell	26,800	37.07
Total votes		72,287	100.0
Republican hold			

34th District (Mason, Muskegon, Oceana, Newaygo)
Party	Candidate	Votes	%
Republican	Gerald Van Woerkom	42,180	48.38
Democratic	Bob Shrauger	41,233	47.3
Reform	Max Rieske	1,882	2.16
Total votes		85,295	100.0
Republican hold			

35th District (Benzie, Clare, Kalkaska, Lake, Leelanau, Manistee, Mecosta, Missaukee, Osceola, Roscommon, Wexford)
Party	Candidate	Votes	%
Republican	Michelle McManus	51,405	60.89
Democratic	Carl Dahlberg	30,942	36.65
Libertarian	Donald Atkinson	2,076	2.46
Total votes		84,423	100.0
Republican hold			

36th District (Alcona, Alpena, Crawford, Gladwin, Iosco, Midland, Montmorency, Ogemaw, Oscoda, Otsego)
Party	Candidate	Votes	%
Republican	Tony Stamas	46,511	51.11
Democratic	Andy Neumann	44,487	48.89
Total votes		90,998	100.0
Republican hold			

37th District (Grand Traverse, Antrim, Charlevoix, Emmet, Cheboygan, Presque Isle, Chippewa, Mackinac)
Party	Candidate	Votes	%
Republican	Jason Allen	53,490	59.87
Democratic	Michael Estes	35,852	40.13
Total votes		89,342	100.0
Republican hold			

38th District (Upper Peninsula (excluding Mackinac, Chippewa))
Party	Candidate	Votes	%
Democratic	Mike Prusi	51,348	60.83
Republican	David Schoenow	33,063	39.17
Total votes		84,411	100.0
Democratic hold			

== See also ==
- Michigan House of Representatives election, 2002
