= Senator DeGrow =

Senator DeGrow may refer to:

- Alvin J. DeGrow (1926–2016), Michigan State Senate
- Dan DeGrow (born 1953), Michigan State Senate
