= Sietsema =

Sietsema is a surname. Notable people with the surname include:

- George Sietsema (1918–1991), American politician
- Hennie Sietsema, Dutch kortebaanschaatsen speed skater
- Jelt Sietsema (1921–2005), American politician
- Paul Sietsema (born 1968), American artist
- Robert Sietsema, American food critic
