= Lisa Posthumus Lyons =

American politician (born 1980)

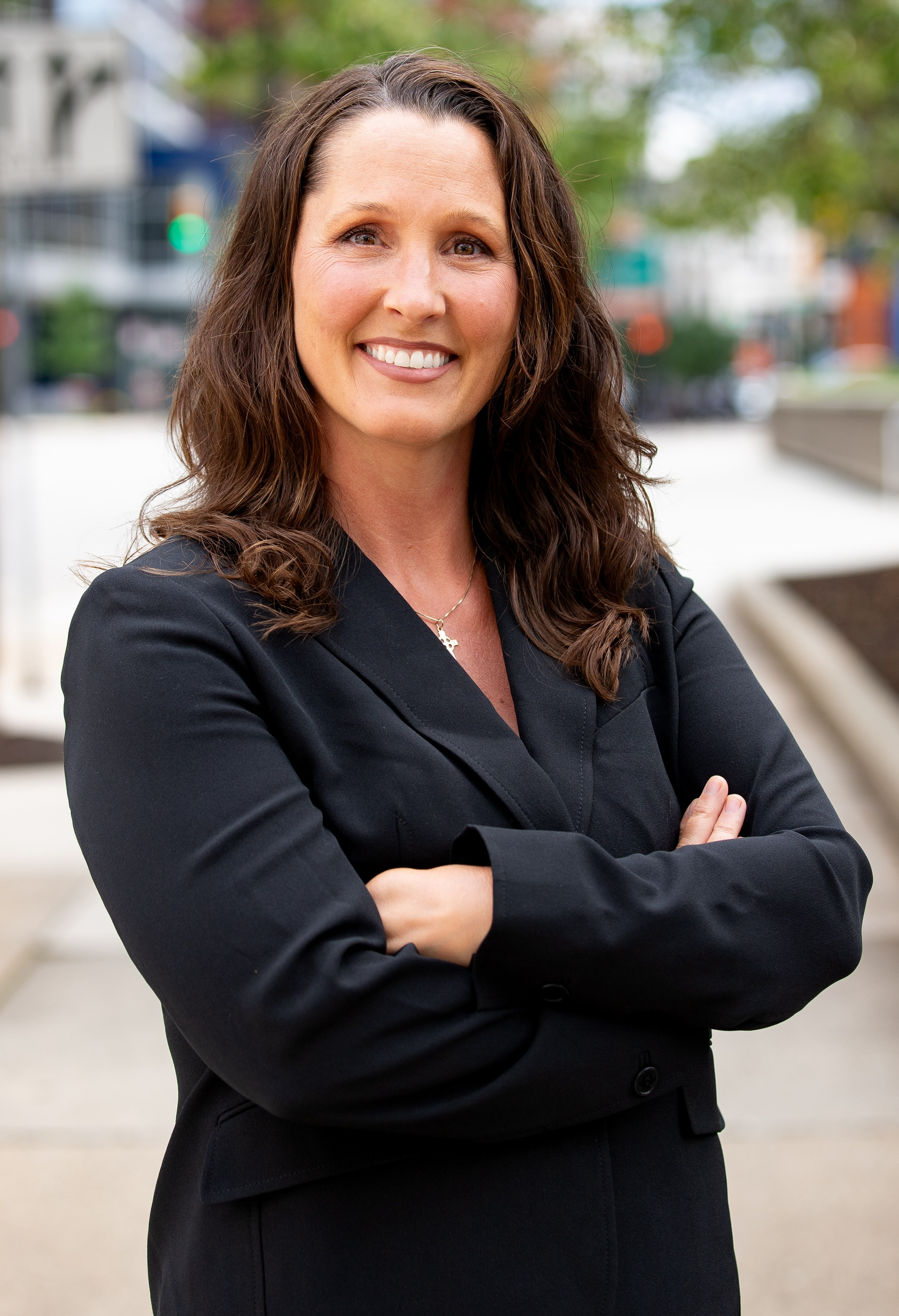
- Lyons in 2024

Clerk and Register of Deeds of Kent County
- Incumbent
- Assumed office January 1, 2017
- Preceded by: Mary Hollinrake

Member of the Michigan House of Representatives from the 86th district
- In office January 1, 2011 – December 31, 2016
- Preceded by: Dave Hildenbrand
- Succeeded by: Thomas Albert

Personal details
- Born: Lisa Dawn Posthumus; June 12, 1980 (age 46) Alto, Michigan, U.S.
- Party: Republican
- Spouse: Brad Lyons (m. 2003)
- Children: 4
- Parent: Dick Posthumus (father)
- Relatives: Bryan Posthumus (brother)
- Education: Michigan State University (BS)

Lisa Posthumus Lyons (born June 12, 1980) is an American politician who served three terms as a Republican member of the Michigan House of Representatives for the 86th district (portions of Ionia and Kent Counties) from 2011 to 2016. She is currently the elected Kent County clerk and register of deeds.

Lyons was named by the Grand Rapids Business Journal as one of The 50 Most Influential Women in West Michigan in 2018.

== Early life and education ==
Lyons was born and raised in Alto, Michigan. She is the daughter of Dick Posthumus, who served as lieutenant governor of Michigan from 1999 to 2003 and was the Republican nominee for governor in 2002.

Lyons graduated from Lowell High School and earned a Bachelor of Science degree in agricultural and natural resources communications from Michigan State University.

== Career ==
Prior to elected office, Lyons was the director of public policy and community outreach for the Grand Rapids Association of Realtors.

=== Michigan House of Representatives ===
In the 2010 general election, Lyons defeated Frank Hammond with 25,943 votes, to 10,996 for Hammond and 909 for Libertarian Robin VanLoon. She was subsequently re-elected in 2012 and 2014. During her tenure, she chaired the House standing committees on education and on ethics and elections, and authored 32 public acts that were signed into law.

In 2012, after supporting a right-to-work law, Lyons proposed an amendment exempting corrections officers. In response to accusations of a conflict of interest regarding her husband's employment as a corrections officer at that time, she said that Democrats had suggested the same sort of legislation in the past, and that her constituency includes hundreds of corrections officers.

In June 2013, during a school dissolution bill debate, she said "Pigs get fat, hogs get slaughtered" in response to the request that surrounding districts interview the teachers from the dissolving school. The remarks were criticized in the media and a former teacher of hers sent a letter condemning her use of the phrase. Lyons later clarified that the remarks were meant for lobbyists such as the teachers' union and not the teachers themselves.

Lyons was term-limited in 2016 after serving three terms.

=== Kent county clerk and register of deeds ===
In the 2016 general election, Lyons was elected to the combined office of Kent county clerking register of deeds with 158,341 votes to Democratic Party candidate Christopher Reader's 115,244 votes, and Libertarian candidate James Lewis' 16,017 votes. She began her four-year term of office in January 2017. The Kent County Clerk's Office is responsible for managing county elections, vital records, and circuit court files. In Kent County, the clerk also serves as clerk for the county board of commissioners and statutorily serves on numerous boards and commissions.

Lyons was re-elected clerk in the 2020 general election with 186,362 votes to Democratic Party candidate Devin Ortega-Ferguson's 149,803 votes. She is currently serving her second four-year term. In response to mistrust in elections and the attempts to overturn the 2020 United States presidential election, Lyons has emphasized the accuracy of voting equipment.

=== Lieutenant governor candidate ===
On August 15, 2018, Michigan Attorney General Bill Schuette announced Lyons as his running mate for his gubernatorial campaign. Her nomination was confirmed by the Michigan Republican State Convention on August 25, 2018 and she officially joined the Republican ticket as candidate for Lieutenant Governor of the State of Michigan. The pair lost the general election on November 6, 2018 to the Democratic ticket of Gretchen Whitmer and Garlin Gilchrist.

== Personal life ==
In 2003, Lyons married her husband Brad Lyons, who is a deputy sheriff in Kent County. They have four children.

== Electoral history ==
Michigan gubernatorial election, 2018
Party	Candidate	Votes	%	±%
Democratic	Gretchen Whitmer Garlin Gilchrist	2,256,791	53.34%	+6.48%
Republican	Bill Schuette Lisa Posthumus Lyons	1,853,650	43.81%	−7.11%
Libertarian	Bill Gelineau Angelique Chaiser Thomas	56,752	1.34%	+0.21%
Constitution	Todd Schleiger Earl P. Lackie	24,701	0.58%	−0.03%
Green	Jennifer V. Kurland Charin H. Davenport	28,857	0.68%	+0.21%
Natural Law	Keith Butkovitch Raymond Warner	10,258	0.24%	−
Majority		403,141	9.53%	+5.47%
Turnout		4,231,009		34.04%
Swing to Democratic from Republican		Swing		

Party political offices
Preceded by Brian Calley	Republican nominee for Lieutenant Governor of Michigan; 2018	Succeeded by Shane Hernandez
