= Intelligence Authorization Act =

United States Law

Intelligence Authorization Act, Fiscal Year 1991
- Long title: To authorize appropriations for fiscal year 1991 for intelligence activities of the United States Government, the Intelligence Community Staff, and the Central Intelligence Agency Retirement and Disability System, and for other purposes.
- Enacted by: the 102nd United States Congress

Legislative history
- Introduced in the House as H.R. 1455 by Dave McCurdy (D–OK) on March 18, 1991; Committee consideration by United States House Permanent Select Committee on Intelligence; Passed the House on May 1, 1991 (Voice vote); Passed the Senate on June 28, 1991 (Voice vote); Signed into law by President George H. W. Bush on August 14, 1991

The Intelligence Authorization Act is a yearly bill implemented in order to codify covert, clandestine operations and defines requirements for reporting such operations to the Congress. The first act was passed along with the Intelligence Oversight Act of 1980, which allowed Congress and members of the agency to be included in important decisions and operations carried out by the Central Intelligence Agency (CIA). The first Intelligence Authorization Act was also an attempt to limit the authority and secrecy within the CIA regarding foreign and domestic affairs, though its applications extends to each of the intelligence agencies, not just to the CIA.

== Provisions of the 1991 Act ==
The 1991 Act states that all secret operations carried out by the agency must be approved by the president of the United States. In turn, all parties involved must be recorded and made public to Congress. Therefore, the Intelligence Authorization Act also publicized the president's involvement in both foreign affairs and special actions within the CIA. With the passing of the Intelligence Authorization Act, the agency is required to submit a report on budgetary spending within to the CIA to Congress.

The Intelligence Authorization Act of fiscal year 1993 called for a revision of the structure of the Agency. The National Intelligence Council was developed so that the DCI could have overall authority on what was suggested in the reports given to Congress. The seats in the council were filled with members of the community who held senior positions with budgetary analysis backgrounds. The 1993 revision also cemented the DCI's position regarding international affairs within the community as well as the United States' foreign policies. The United States secretary of defense must consult the DCI before hiring new members of intelligence agencies.

The Intelligence Authorization Act of fiscal year 1994, passed on December 3, 1993, forced the documentation of unclassified operations. These would be submitted by the head of central intelligence, the Director of Central Intelligence. Reports on counter terrorist actions, as well as gaps within the agency must be submitted to Congress.

The U.S. Constitution requires that "a regular Statement and Account of the Receipts and Expenditures of all public Money shall be published from time to time." Due to this requirement, attempts have been made to revise the Act in order to make the agency's budget spending available to the American public. Congress has rejected this revision since 1993. There are a number of reasons behind the rejection. Government officials have assumed that because the amount of money would be unexplainable without including a total report on CIA actions, the public would continue to ask for more information. Congress has also suggested that patterns could be made with the analysis of yearly reports, which would allow anyone with access to discover details of secret operations within the agency.

== History ==
The Act is passed yearly, with the latest bills for FY2024 being introduced in the House (H.R.3932) and the Senate (S.2103), respectively. The Act was first passed in 1991. It has been suggested that this process is an indirect result of the scandals that were present during the Nixon Administration as well as abuses during the Reagan Administration. Following Richard Nixon's resignation, Congress reacted by passing a number of bills to strengthen their authority regarding domestic and foreign operations within the CIA.

Following the scandal of Nixon, the U.S. Congress grew increasingly skeptical of the secret dealings of the president. While expanding the power of Congress, the Act also supported the Hughes–Ryan Amendment which prevented the President from denying his involvement in secret operations, in this case, those of the Central Intelligence Agency. This revision was most important during the Era of Skepticism in which Congress was most interested in the president's actions due to Nixon's Watergate scandal.

The proceeding revisions have resulted in greater authority of the Director of Central Intelligence. Ultimate authority lies in the hands of Congress and can be displayed using two main actions. Much of the funding provided by Congress must be spent and publicized by the end of the fiscal year. This prevents the CIA from becoming involved in overly expensive operations. Congress is also the main decision maker regarding covert actions and can reject the funding of operations supported by the CIA, such as their attempt to overthrow the Nicaraguan government in 1982.

== Related legislation ==
- Intelligence Authorization Act for Fiscal Years 2014 and 2015 – a bill that passed the House in May 2014. The bill would authorizes different intelligence agencies and their activities in fiscal years 2014 and 2015. The total spending authorized by the bill is classified, but estimates based on intelligence leaks made by Edward Snowden indicated that the budget could be approximately $50 billion.
- Intelligence Authorization Act for Fiscal Year 2014 – a bill that would authorize appropriations for fiscal year 2014 for intelligence activities of the U.S. government. The bill would authorize there to be funding for intelligence agencies such as the Central Intelligence Agency or the National Security Agency, but a separate appropriations bill would also have to pass in order for those agencies to receive any money.
- Intelligence Authorization Act for Fiscal Year 2027 – a bill that would authorize appropriations for fiscal year 2027 for intelligence activities of the U.S. government.

== See also ==
- Secret law
- National Defense Authorization Act
- Department of Defense Appropriations Act
  - Department of Defense Appropriations Act, 2015
