= 2002 Michigan gubernatorial election =

- November 5, 2002
- Turnout: 3,177,565
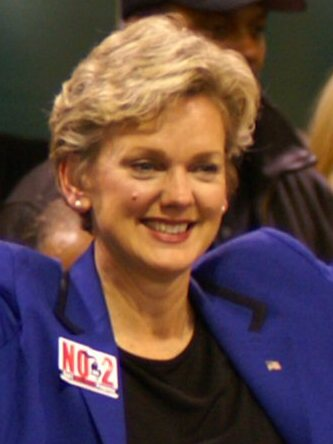

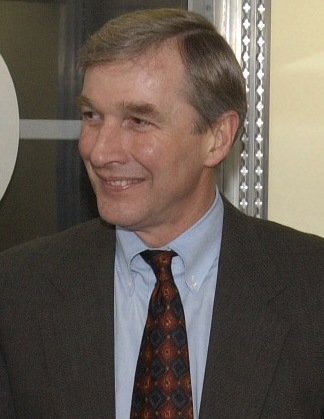
Nominee	Jennifer Granholm	Dick Posthumus
Party	Democratic	Republican
Running mate	John Cherry	Loren Bennett
Popular vote	1,631,276	1,504,755
Percentage	51.42%	47.40%
- Granholm: 40–50% 50–60% 60–70% 70–80% 80–90% Posthumus: 40–50% 50–60% 60–70% 70–80%
Governor before election
John Engler
Republican
Elected Governor
Jennifer Granholm
Democratic

The 2002 Michigan gubernatorial election was one of the 36 United States gubernatorial elections held on November 5, 2002. Incumbent Republican Governor John Engler, after serving three terms, was ineligible to run again. A 1992 constitutional amendment limited the governor to two terms, even if they are nonconsecutive, effective with the 1994 election. Engler's lieutenant governor Dick Posthumus, also a Republican, ran in his place. Jennifer Granholm, then attorney general of Michigan, ran on the Democratic Party ticket. Douglas Campbell ran on the Green Party ticket, and Joseph M. Pilchak ran on the Constitution Party ticket.

Granholm won with 51% of the vote, followed by Posthumus' 47%, Campbell with 1%, and Pilchak with less than 1%. This made Granholm the first female Michigan governor, and the first Democratic governor of Michigan in 12 years.

== Republican primary ==
=== Candidates ===
- Dick Posthumus, lieutenant governor of Michigan
- Joe Schwarz, state senator from Battle Creek

=== Campaign ===
With incumbent Governor John Engler ineligible to seek re-election for a fourth term, Posthumus, Michigan's lieutenant governor, was considered the overwhelming favorite for the Republican nomination. Following his primary win, Posthumus selected state Sen. Loren Bennett as his running mate.

Jim Moody created a candidate committee and filed a statement of organization, but did not submit sufficient ballot-access petition signatures to be included on the 2002 primary ballot.

=== Results ===
Republican primary results
Party	Candidate	Votes	%
Republican	Dick Posthumus	474,804	81.39%
Republican	Joe Schwarz	108,581	18.61%
Republican	Angelo Scott Brown (write-in)	6	0.00%
Total votes		583,391	100.00%

Primary results by county: Posthumus: Posthumus—50–60%; Posthumus—60–70%; Posthumus—70–80%; Posthumus—80–90%; Posthumus—90–100%

== Democratic primary ==
=== Candidates ===
- James J. Blanchard, former governor of Michigan (1983–91) and U.S. ambassador to Canada
- David Bonior, U.S. representative from Mount Clemens and House minority whip
- Jennifer Granholm, Michigan attorney general and former corporation counsel for Wayne County (1994–98)

=== Campaign ===
The Democratic Party primary was a competitive, three-way race among state Attorney General Jennifer Granholm, former Gov. James Blanchard (who was upset by Engler in 1990) and former House Minority Whip David Bonior.

Granholm was accused in the 2002 Democratic primary of several allegations of cronyism. Her husband, Daniel Mulhern, had received several contracts for his leadership training company shortly after Granholm left her position as Wayne County corporation counsel in 1998. He received nearly $300,000 worth of contracts, despite being the highest bidder for one of those contracts. Opponents criticized Granholm's supporters for engaging in cronyism and giving contracts to her husband immediately after leaving county employment. Granholm and her supporters responded that no ethical violations had occurred, and that Mulhern had earned the contracts on his own merits.

Granholm was the first woman ever nominated by a major party to be Michigan governor. Following her primary victory, Granholm chose state Sen. John Cherry as her running mate.

=== Results ===
Democratic primary results
Party	Candidate	Votes	%
Democratic	Jennifer Granholm	499,129	47.69%
Democratic	David Bonior	292,958	27.99%
Democratic	James J. Blanchard	254,586	24.32%
Democratic	Tracey Elaine Stevenson (write-in)	7	0.00%
Total votes		1,046,680	100.00%

Primary results by county: Granholm: Granholm—30–40%; Granholm—40–50%; Granholm—50–60%; Granholm—60–70%; Granholm—70–80%; Granholm—80–90%; Bonior: Bonior—40–50%; Bonior—50–60%

== General election ==
=== Candidates ===
Green Party candidate Douglas Campbell
- Douglas Campbell, Ferndale engineer and staffer for the Ralph Nader 2000 presidential campaign (Green)
- Jennifer Granholm, Michigan attorney general (Democratic)
- Joseph Pilchak, Capac resident and candidate for U.S. representative in 2000 (U.S. Taxpayers)
- Dick Posthumus, lieutenant governor of Michigan (Republican)

The Green Party of Michigan nominated Douglas Campbell. Campbell, a registered professional engineer and published atheist from Ferndale, joined the Green Party upon learning of its existence in 2000, and was the Wayne-Oakland-Macomb County campaign coordinator for Green Party presidential candidate Ralph Nader, 2000. During the 2002 campaign, he claimed he was beaten, arrested and jailed (in Brighton, Michigan) for attempting to participate in a gubernatorial debate from which he was excluded, at the time being the only candidate who was not either a Republican or Democrat.

Capac resident Joseph Pilchak was nominated by convention to be the U.S. Taxpayers Party candidate for Governor of Michigan. He was the U.S. Taxpayers Party candidate for U.S. representative from Michigan 10th District in 2000. The Michigan US Taxpayers' Party is affiliated with the United States Constitution Party, but Michigan election law does not provide a mechanism for changing the name of a political party.

=== Campaign ===
Posthumus, who had been previous governor Engler's lieutenant governor, ran his general election campaign promising to maintain the Engler legacy.

Granholm promised change, running as a tough crime fighter and consumer advocate. She criticized the Engler administration for coming into office with a budget surplus and leaving with a deficit.

=== Kilpatrick memo controversy ===
In the biggest event of the election, Posthumus released a memo from Detroit Mayor Kwame Kilpatrick asking for more appointments for Black people and jobs for Detroit contractors in a Granholm administration. Posthumus pointed to the memo as an example of Democratic Party corruption. Granholm, however, denied ever receiving the memo and said she would not have agreed to it anyway. She said that Posthumus was trying to be racially divisive.

=== Predictions ===
Source	Ranking	As of
The Cook Political Report	Lean D (flip)	October 31, 2002
Sabato's Crystal Ball	Likely D (flip)	November 4, 2002

=== Polling ===
Poll source	Date(s) administered	Sample size (Note: Key: A – all adults RV – registered voters LV – likely voters V – unclear)	Margin of error	Jennifer Granholm (D)	Dick Posthumus (R)	Other / Undecided
SurveyUSA	November 1–3, 2002	730 (LV)	± 3.7%	52%	46%	3%

=== Results ===
2002 Michigan gubernatorial election
Party	Candidate	Votes	%	±%
Democratic	Jennifer Granholm	1,633,796	51.42%	+13.64%
Republican	Dick Posthumus	1,506,104	47.40%	−14.81%
Green	Douglas Campbell	25,236	0.79%	
U.S. Taxpayers	Joseph Pilchak	12,411	0.39%	
	Don Mackle (write-in)	7	0.00%	
	Mark Anthony McFarlin (write-in)	6	0.00%	
	Angelo Scott Brown (write-in)	5	0.00%	
Majority		127,692	4.02%	
Total votes		3,177,565	100.00%	
Democratic gain from Republican		Swing	+28.45%	

=== Results by county ===
County	Jennifer Granholm Democratic		Dick Posthumus Republican		Douglas Campbell Green		Joseph Pilchak U.S. Taxpayers		Margin		Total votes cast
County	#	%	#	%	#	%	#	%	#	%	Total votes cast
Alcona	2,165	47.20%	2,387	52.04%	26	0.57%	9	0.20%	-222	-4.84%	4,587
Alger	1,855	52.59%	1,623	46.02%	38	1.08%	11	0.31%	232	6.58%	3,527
Allegan	12,772	36.66%	21,695	62.28%	250	0.72%	119	0.34%	-8,923	-25.61%	34,836
Alpena	6,391	56.95%	4,722	42.07%	62	0.05%	48	0.43%	1,669	14.87%	11,223
Antrim	3,752	39.67%	5,576	58.96%	91	0.96%	38	0.40%	-1,824	-19.29%	9,457
Arenac	2,821	51.14%	2,611	47.34%	45	0.82%	39	0.71%	210	3.81%	5,516
Baraga	1,263	50.93%	1,170	47.18%	28	1.13%	19	0.77%	93	3.75%	2,480
Barry	8,136	40.15%	11,943	58.93%	125	0.62%	62	0.31%	-3,807	-18.79%	20,266
Bay	21,190	53.29%	18,001	45.27%	353	0.89%	215	0.54%	3,189	8.02%	39,762 (Note: Includes 3 write-in votes for Mark Anthony McFarlin)
Benzie	3,036	45.83%	3,480	52.23%	88	1.33%	21	0.32%	-44	-6.70%	6,625
Berrien	17,094	41.85%	23,378	57.24%	230	0.56%	143	0.35%	6,284	15.38%	40,845
Branch	5,001	45.04%	6,012	54.14%	53	0.48%	38	0.34%	-1,011	-9.10%	11,104
Calhoun	21,298	52.59%	18,789	46.40%	263	0.65%	146	0.36%	2,509	6.20%	40,496
Cass	5,741	45.10%	6,845	53.77%	73	0.57%	70	0.55%	-1,104	-8.67%	12,729
Charlevoix	3,836	39.89%	5,608	58.31%	136	1.41%	37	0.38%	-1,772	-18.43%	9,617
Cheboygan	4,107	43.29%	5,268	55.53%	66	0.70%	46	0.48%	-1,161	-12.24%	9,487
Chippewa	5,428	49.81%	5,357	49.16%	73	0.67%	40	0.37%	71	0.65%	10,898
Clare	4,719	50.05%	4,578	48.56%	73	0.77%	58	0.62%	141	1.50%	9,428
Clinton	12,070	46.32%	13,711	52.61%	188	0.72%	91	0.35%	-1,641	-6.30%	26,060
Crawford	2,233	45.65%	2,566	52.45%	40	0.82%	53	1.08%	-333	-6.81%	4,892
Delta	6,862	50.37%	6,590	48.37%	112	0.82%	60	0.44%	272	2.00%	13,624
Dickinson	3,882	46.47%	4,358	52.17%	67	0.80%	46	0.55%	-476	-5.70%	8,353
Eaton	20,395	52.24%	18,247	46.74%	262	0.67%	136	0.35%	2,148	5.50%	39,040
Emmet	4,330	37.16%	7,111	61.02%	169	1.45%	43	0.37%	-2,781	-23.87%	11,653
Genesee	80,687	60.12%	51,828	38.62%	1,138	0.85%	560	0.42%	28,859	21.50%	134,215 (Note: Includes 1 write-in vote for Mark Anthony McFarlin and 1 write-in vote for Angelo Scott Brown)
Gladwin	4,350	48.17%	4,569	50.59%	66	0.73%	46	0.51%	-219	-2.42%	9,031
Gogebic	3,292	57.90%	2,308	40.59%	56	0.98%	30	0.53%	984	17.31%	5,686
Grand Traverse	12,330	40.92%	17,382	57.69%	299	0.99%	119	0.39%	-5,052	-16.77%	30,130
Gratiot	5,203	44.94%	6,252	54.00%	69	0.60%	53	0.46%	-1,049	-9.06%	11,577
Hillsdale	4,778	38.45%	7,498	60.33%	89	0.72%	63	0.51%	-2,720	-21.89%	12,428
Houghton	5,026	48.56%	5,119	49.46%	157	1.52%	48	0.46%	-93	-0.90%	10,350
Huron	4,783	39.41%	7,218	59.48%	80	0.66%	54	0.44%	-2,435	-20.07%	12,135
Ingham	55,571	60.95%	34,414	37.74%	880	0.97%	312	0.34%	21,157	23.20%	91,177
Ionia	7,919	43.25%	10,232	55.88%	100	0.55%	60	0.33%	-2,313	-12.63%	18,311
Iosco	5,031	50.32%	4,817	48.17%	88	0.88%	63	0.63%	214	2.14%	9,999
Iron	2,429	53.51%	2,017	44.44%	51	1.12%	42	0.93%	412	9.08%	4,539
Isabella	7,534	49.50%	7,428	48.80%	200	1.31%	59	0.39%	106	0.70%	15,221
Jackson	22,036	46.92%	24,344	51.83%	365	0.78%	220	0.47%	-2,308	-4.91%	46,965
Kalamazoo	39,090	52.29%	34,795	46.54%	648	0.87%	225	0.30%	4,295	5.75%	74,758
Kalkaska	2,234	42.02%	3,010	56.62%	39	0.73%	33	0.62%	-776	-14.60%	5,316
Kent	74,823	38.53%	117,755	60.63%	1,187	0.61%	447	0.23%	-42,932	-22.11%	194,212
Keweenaw	482	45.99%	545	52.00%	17	1.62%	4	0.38%	-63	-6.01%	1,048
Lake	1,904	52.24%	1,671	45.84%	41	1.12%	29	0.80%	233	6.39%	3,645
Lapeer	11,384	39.40%	17,040	58.98%	242	0.84%	225	0.78%	-5,656	-19.58%	28,891
Leelanau	4,241	42.95%	5,501	55.71%	105	1.06%	28	0.28%	-1,260	-12.76%	9,875
Lenawee	13,314	47.13%	14,650	51.86%	176	0.62%	111	0.39%	-1,336	-4.73%	28,251
Livingston	22,006	37.09%	36,699	61.86%	419	0.71%	206	0.35%	-14,693	-24.76%	59,330
Luce	1,016	52.26%	889	45.73%	24	1.23%	15	0.77%	127	6.53%	1,944
Mackinac	2,206	47.28%	2,425	51.97%	23	0.49%	12	0.26%	-219	-4.69%	4,666
Macomb	121,065	47.16%	132,583	51.64%	1,969	0.77%	1,113	0.43%	-11,518	-4.49%	256,730
Manistee	4,389	49.31%	4,401	49.45%	59	0.66%	51	0.57%	-12	-0.13%	8,900
Marquette	12,779	57.69%	8,906	40.21%	337	1.52%	128	0.58%	3,873	17.49%	22,150
Mason	4,802	45.58%	5,594	53.09%	93	0.88%	47	0.45%	-792	-7.52%	10,536
Mecosta	5,020	44.28%	6,197	54.66%	83	0.73%	38	0.34%	-1,177	-10.38%	11,338
Menominee	3,335	47.41%	3,576	50.83%	59	0.84%	65	0.92%	-241	-3.43%	7,035
Midland	12,342	41.31%	17,156	57.43%	263	0.88%	113	0.38%	-4,814	-16.11%	29,874
Missaukee	1,724	32.92%	3,462	66.11%	31	0.59%	20	0.38%	-1,738	-33.19%	5,237
Monroe	19,845	47.75%	21,266	51.17%	279	0.67%	168	0.40%	-1,421	-3.42%	41,558
Montcalm	7,763	44.18%	9,689	55.14%	75	0.43%	44	0.25%	-1,926	-10.96%	17,571
Montmorency	1,722	42.94%	2,231	55.64%	27	0.67%	30	0.75%	-509	-12.69%	4,010
Muskegon	29,884	56.49%	22,600	42.72%	264	0.50%	156	0.29%	7,284	13.77%	52,904
Newaygo	6,268	40.84%	8,910	58.06%	103	0.67%	66	0.43%	-2,642	-17.22%	15,347
Oakland	220,082	50.52%	210,414	48.30%	3,676	0.84%	1,438	0.33%	9,668	2.22%	435,611 (Note: Includes 1 write-in vote for Don Mackle)
Oceana	3,886	45.18%	4,637	53.91%	40	0.47%	38	0.44%	-751	-8.73%	8,601
Ogemaw	3,727	49.54%	3,689	49.04%	77	1.02%	30	0.40%	38	0.51%	7,523
Ontonagon	1,301	48.38%	1,334	49.61%	26	0.97%	28	1.04%	-33	-1.23%	2,689
Osceola	2,973	39.97%	4,399	59.13%	44	0.59%	23	0.31%	-1,426	-19.17%	7,439
Oscoda	1,242	41.85%	1,669	56.23%	32	1.08%	22	0.74%	-427	-14.39%	2,968 (Note: Includes 3 write-in votes for Angelo Scott Brown)
Otsego	3,346	39.49%	4,982	58.80%	85	1.00%	60	0.71%	-1,636	-19.31%	8,473
Ottawa	24,654	28.11%	62,464	71.22%	408	0.47%	175	0.20%	-37,810	-43.11%	87,701
Presque Isle	2,717	48.15%	2,862	50.72%	33	0.58%	31	0.55%	-145	-2.57%	5,643
Roscommon	4,909	47.85%	5,223	50.91%	83	0.81%	45	0.44%	-314	-3.06%	10,260
Saginaw	38,051	52.65%	33,440	46.27%	506	0.70%	278	0.38%	4,611	6.38%	72,277 (Note: Includes 2 write-in votes for Mark Anthony McFarlin)
Sanilac	5,265	37.39%	8,581	60.94%	119	0.85%	116	0.82%	-3,316	-23.55%	14,081
Schoolcraft	1,701	52.86%	1,468	45.62%	32	0.99%	17	0.53%	233	7.24%	3,218
Shiawassee	11,843	47.05%	12,971	51.53%	212	0.84%	147	0.58%	-1,128	-4.48%	25,173
St. Clair	23,813	45.44%	27,647	52.76%	490	0.94%	453	0.86%	-3,834	-7.32%	52,403
St. Joseph	6,341	40.87%	9,014	58.10%	89	0.57%	70	0.45%	-2,673	-17.23%	15,514
Tuscola	8,097	42.13%	10,824	56.32%	195	1.01%	103	0.54%	-2,727	-14.19%	19,219
Van Buren	10,518	49.15%	10,685	49.93%	126	0.59%	71	0.33%	-167	-0.78%	21,400
Washtenaw	65,995	61.41%	39,659	36.90%	1,507	1.40%	313	0.29%	26,336	24.50%	107,474
Wayne	384,121	67.81%	175,899	31.05%	4,267	0.75%	2,204	0.39%	208,222	36.76%	566,498 (Note: Includes 6 write-in votes for Don Mackle and 1 write-in vote for Angelo Scott Brown)
Wexford	4,230	42.28%	5,640	56.37%	77	0.77%	58	0.58%	-1,410	-14.09%	10,005
Total	1,633,796	51.42%	1,506,104	47.40%	25,236	0.79%	12,411	0.39%	127,692	4.02%	3,177,565

==== Counties that flipped from Republican to Democratic ====
- Alger (largest city: Munising)
- Alpena (largest city: Alpena)
- Arenac (largest city: Standish)
- Baraga (Largest city: Baraga)
- Bay (largest city: Bay City)
- Calhoun (largest city: Battle Creek)
- Chippewa (Largest city: Sault Ste. Marie)
- Clare (largest city: Clare)
- Delta (largest city: Escanaba)
- Eaton (largest city: Charlotte)
- Genesee (largest city: Flint)
- Gogebic (largest city: Ironwood)
- Ingham (largest city: Lansing)
- Iosco (largest city: East Tawas)
- Iron (largest city: Iron River)
- Isabella (largest city: Mount Pleasant)
- Kalamazoo (largest city: Kalamazoo)
- Lake (largest village: Baldwin)
- Luce (largest city: Newberry)
- Marquette (largest city: Marquette)
- Muskegon (largest city: Muskegon)
- Oakland (largest city: Troy)
- Ogemaw (largest city: West Branch)
- Saginaw (largest city: Saginaw
- Schoolcraft (largest city: Manistique)
- Washtenaw (largest city: Ann Arbor)

=== By congressional district ===
Posthumus won 10 of 15 congressional districts, including one won by a Democrat.

District	Posthumus	Granholm	Representative
1st	50.1%	48.4%	Bart Stupak
2nd	59.4%	39.8%	Pete Hoekstra
3rd	60.0%	39.1%	Vern Ehlers
4th	54.2%	44.6%	Dave Camp
5th	40.7%	58.0%	Dale Kildee
6th	51.8%	47.1%	Fred Upton
7th	50.2%	48.7%	Nick Smith
8th	50.9%	47.9%	Mike Rogers
9th	49.8%	49.1%	Joe Knollenberg
10th	56.8%	41.8%	David Bonior
10th	56.8%	41.8%	Candice Miller
11th	52.3%	46.5%	Thaddeus McCotter
12th	39.7%	59.0%	Sander Levin
13th	20.7%	78.2%	Carolyn Cheeks Kilpatrick
14th	18.3%	80.8%	John Conyers Jr.
15th	40.1%	58.3%	John Dingell
