= William Doorn =

American politician (1901–1966)

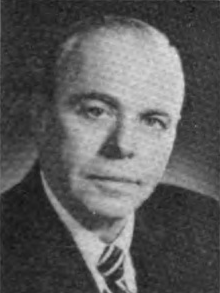

Member of the Michigan House of Representatives from the Kent County 2nd district
- In office January 1, 1961 – December 31, 1964
- Preceded by: Harry T. Emmons
- Succeeded by: District abolished

Mayor of Wyoming, Michigan
- In office 1959–1959
- Succeeded by: Johannes C. Kolderman Jr.

Personal details
- Born: March 16, 1901 Netherlands
- Died: August 28, 1966 (aged 65)
- Party: Republican

William Doorn (March 16, 1901 – August 28, 1966) was a Michigan politician.

== Early life ==
Doorn was born in the Netherlands on March 16, 1901.

== Career ==
Doorn was elected to the position of mayor of Wyoming, Michigan in 1959. Later that same year, Doorn resigned this position. On November 8, 1966, Doorn was elected to the Michigan House of Representatives where he represented the Kent County 2nd district from January 11, 1961 to December 31, 1964. Doorn was not re-elected in 1964.

== Personal life ==
Doorn was married and had two children.

== Death ==
Doorn died on August 28, 1966.
