= Intelligence Authorization Act for Fiscal Years 2014 and 2015 =

United States Law

- Long title: To authorize appropriations for fiscal years 2014 and 2015 for intelligence and intelligence-related activities of the United States Government, the Community Management Account, and the Central Intelligence Agency Retirement and Disability System, and for other purposes.
- Announced in: the 113th United States Congress
- Sponsored by: Rep. Mike Rogers (R, MI-8)
- Number of co-sponsors: 0

Codification
- U.S.C. sections affected: 50 U.S.C. § 3306
- Agencies affected: National Geospatial-Intelligence Agency, United States Department of Justice, United States Department of the Air Force, Executive Office of the President, Central Intelligence Agency, Director of National Intelligence, United States Department of Energy, United States Department of State, National Reconnaissance Office, Federal Bureau of Investigation, United States Coast Guard, Drug Enforcement Administration, United States Department of the Navy, United States Department of the Treasury, United States Department of Defense, National Security Agency, Department of Homeland Security, United States Department of the Army, Defense Intelligence Agency
- Authorizations of appropriations: At least $1,042,229,000 with an additional unlimited amount

Legislative history
- Introduced in the House as H.R. 4681 by Rep. Mike Rogers (R, MI-8) on May 20, 2014; Committee consideration by United States House Permanent Select Committee on Intelligence, United States Senate Select Committee on Intelligence; Passed the House on May 30, 2014 (Roll Call Vote 271: 345-59)

The Intelligence Authorization Act for Fiscal Years 2014 and 2015 (H.R. 4681) is a bill that authorizes different intelligence agencies and their activities in fiscal years 2014 and 2015. The total spending authorized by the bill is classified, but estimates based on intelligence leaks made by Edward Snowden indicate that the budget could be approximately $50 billion.

The bill was introduced into and passed the United States House of Representatives during the 113th United States Congress. An Intelligence Authorization Act for FY2014 (P.L. 113-126) was signed into law in July 2014, and separately an Intelligence Authorization Act for 2015 (P.L. 113-293) was signed into law in December 2014.

== Provisions of the bill ==
This summary is based largely on the summary provided by the Congressional Research Service, a public domain source.

The Intelligence Authorization Act for Fiscal Years 2014 and 2015 would authorize FY2014-FY2015 appropriations for the conduct of intelligence and intelligence-related activities of the: (1) Office of the Director of National Intelligence (DNI); (2) Central Intelligence Agency (CIA); (3) United States Department of Defense (DOD); (4) Defense Intelligence Agency (DIA); (5) National Security Agency (NSA); (6) Departments of the Army, Navy, and Air Force; (7) Coast Guard; (8) Departments of State, the Treasury, Energy (DOE), and Justice (DOJ); (9) Federal Bureau of Investigation (FBI); (10) Drug Enforcement Administration (DEA); (11) National Reconnaissance Office; (12) National Geospatial-Intelligence Agency; and (13) United States Department of Homeland Security (DHS).

The bill would specify that the amounts authorized and the authorized personnel ceilings as of September 30, 2014, and as of September 30, 2015, respectively, for such activities are those specified in the classified Schedule of Authorizations for FY2014 and FY2015, which shall be made available to the congressional appropriations committees and the President.

The bill would allow the DNI to authorize employment of civilian personnel in excess of the number authorized for FY2014 or FY2015 when necessary for the performance of important intelligence functions. The bill would require notification to the intelligence committees on the use of such authority.

The bill would require the DNI to establish guidelines to govern the treatment under such authorized personnel levels of employment or assignment in: (1) a student or trainee program; (2) a reserve corps or as a reemployed annuitant; or (3) details, joint duty, or long term, full-time training.

The bill would authorize appropriations for the Intelligence Community Management Account for FY2014 and FY2015, as well as for personnel positions for elements within such Account.

The bill would authorize appropriations for FY2014 and FY2015 for the Central Intelligence Agency Retirement and Disability Fund.

The bill would permit appropriations authorized by this Act for salary, pay, retirement, and other benefits for federal employees to be increased by such additional or supplemental amounts as necessary for increases in such compensation or benefits authorized by law.

The bill would prohibit the authorization of appropriations by this Act from being deemed to constitute authority to conduct any intelligence activity not otherwise authorized by the Constitution or laws of the United States.

== Section 309 ==
An amendment to the bill in December 2014 added Section 309, which statutorily authorized the retention of communications involving United States person for a period of five years with various exemptions the Electronic Frontier Foundation criticized as "massive loopholes" in the law. This prompted Representative Justin Amash to force the roll call vote and send a letter to representatives calling for them to vote against the legislation.

== Congressional Budget Office report ==
This summary is based largely on the summary provided by the Congressional Budget Office, as ordered reported by the House Permanent Select Committee on Intelligence on May 22, 2014. This is a public domain source.

H.R. 4681 would authorize appropriations for fiscal years 2014 and 2015 for intelligence activities of the U.S. government. Since the Congressional Budget Office (CBO) does not provide estimates for classified programs, this estimate addresses only the unclassified aspects of the bill. On that limited basis, CBO estimates that implementing H.R. 4681 would cost about $500 million over the 2015-2019 period, subject to the appropriation of the specified and estimated amounts.

Section 104 would authorize appropriations of $528 million and $505 million for fiscal years 2014 and 2015, respectively, for the Intelligence Community Management Account (ICMA). The ICMA provides the principal source of funding for the Office of the Director of National Intelligence and resources for managing the intelligence agencies. Because CBO anticipates that the bill would be enacted near the start of fiscal year 2015, we estimate that this provision would not affect spending in 2014. However, assuming the appropriation of the amount authorized for fiscal year 2015, CBO estimates that implementing section 104 would cost about $330 million in fiscal year 2015 and about $500 million over the 2015-2019 period.

Section 603 would extend through 2018 the authorization for the Public Interest Declassification Board. The board advises the President on the government’s standards and procedures for releasing and declassifying information. Based on information from the National Archives, CBO estimates that implementing this provision would cost less than $500,000 over the 2015-2019 period.

Enacting H.R 4681 would not affect direct spending or revenues; therefore, pay-as-you-go procedures do not apply. Section 201 would authorize the appropriation of $514 million for the Central Intelligence Agency Retirement and Disability System for both fiscal years 2014 and 2015 (CIARDS). Appropriations to CIARDS are considered mandatory and fund various unfunded liabilities of the system. However, because the amounts authorized are the same as the amounts projected in the CBO baseline, CBO does not ascribe any additional cost to this provision.

H.R. 4681 contains no intergovernmental or private-sector mandates as defined in the Unfunded Mandates Reform Act and would not affect the budgets of state, local, or tribal governments.

On February 5, 2014, CBO transmitted a cost estimate for S. 1681, the Intelligence Authorization Act for Fiscal Year 2014, as reported by the Senate Select Committee on Intelligence on November 12, 2013. S. 1681 would authorize the appropriation of $569 million for fiscal year 2014, or $41 million more than the amount authorized in H.R. 4681. However, unlike our estimate for S. 1681, CBO does not ascribe any cost to that authorization because we expect that H.R. 4681 would not be enacted until near the start of fiscal year 2015. Other differences in the estimated costs of S. 1681 and H.R. 4681 reflect differences between the two bills.

== Procedural history ==
The Intelligence Authorization Act for Fiscal Years 2014 and 2015 was introduced into the United States House of Representatives on May 20, 2014, by Rep. Mike Rogers (R, MI-8). The bill was referred to the United States House Permanent Select Committee on Intelligence. The bill was reported alongside House Report 113-463. On May 30, 2014, the House voted in Roll Call Vote 271 to pass the bill 345-49. The United States Senate received the bill on June 2, 2014, and referred it to the United States Senate Select Committee on Intelligence. It was passed on December 9, 2014, with a voice vote and then referred to the House where it passed 325-100 on December 10, 2014, following a roll call vote.

== Debate and discussion ==
According to news website TechCrunch, Reps. Justin Amash, Zoe Lofgren, and Jared Polis, three "voices usually associated with stronger takes on needed reform of the intelligence organs of the United States" all voted against the bill. Alex Wilhelm described the passage of the bill as being part of a "somewhat dispiriting period for those in favor of reformation of the National Security Agency and its ilk."

Rep. Mike Rogers, who sponsored the bill, argued that the controversies as a result of the global surveillance disclosures had left Americans with the wrong impression of intelligence activities. Rogers said that "we have somehow decided over the last year that our intelligence services are the problem... they are part of the solution."

== See also ==
- List of bills in the 113th United States Congress
- Intelligence Authorization Act
