= George Sietsema =

American politician

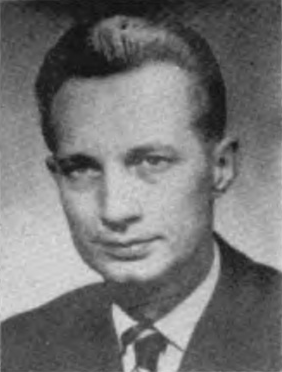

Mayor of Wyoming, Michigan
- In office 1985–1987
- Preceded by: Harold Isenga
- Succeeded by: Charles J. Huizenga

Member of the Michigan House of Representatives from the 94th district
- In office January 13, 1965 – December 31, 1966
- Preceded by: District established
- Succeeded by: Johannes C. Kolderman Jr.

Personal details
- Born: April 1, 1918 Grundy Center, Iowa, US
- Died: March 6, 1991 (aged 72)
- Party: Democratic

George Sietsema (April 1, 1918 – March 6, 1991) was a Michigan politician.

== Early life and education ==
George Sietsema was born on April 1, 1918, in Grundy Center, Iowa, to parents Jerry and Gertrude Sietsema. George went through three years of high school before enlisting in the army.

== Military career ==
In 1941, Sietsema enlisted in the United States Army in Kalamazoo, Michigan.

== Career ==
Sietsema was the owner of the Michigan Private Investigation Bureau. Sietsema served as township supervisor, treasurer, and municipal judge in Wyoming Township. He also served on the Kent County Board of Supervisors. In 1956, Sietsema unsuccessfully ran for the Michigan House of Representatives seat representing the Kenty County 2nd district. On November 4, 1964, Sietsema was elected to the Michigan House of Representatives, where he represented the 94th district from January 13, 1965, to December 31, 1966. In 1966, Sietsema unsuccessfully sought re-election to this position. Sietsema served as mayor of Wyoming, Michigan, from 1985 to 1987.

== Personal life ==
In 1940, George Sietsema married Angela Wietsma. Together, they had three children. George was the brother of fellow state representative Jelt Sietsema.

== Death ==
Sietsema died on March 6, 1991.
