= Bryan Posthumus =

American politician

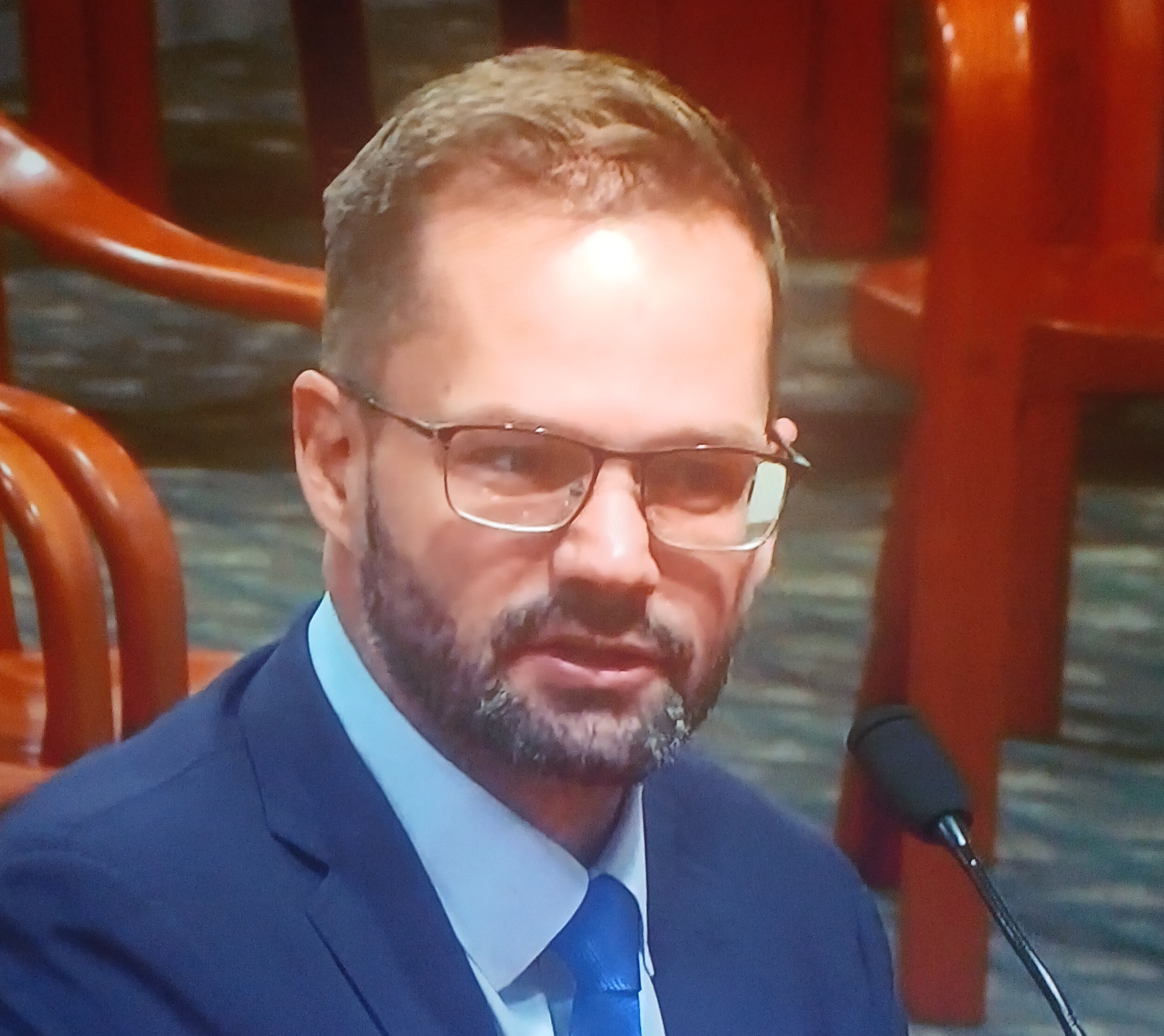
- Bryan Posthumus in 2025

Majority Leader of the Michigan House of Representatives
- Incumbent
- Assumed office January 8, 2025
- Preceded by: Abraham Aiyash

Member of the Michigan House of Representatives
- Incumbent
- Assumed office January 1, 2021
- Preceded by: Lynn Afendoulis
- Constituency: 73rd district (2021–2022); 90th district (2023–present)

Personal details
- Born: Bryan Richard Posthumus; October 26, 1984 (age 41) Grand Rapids, Michigan, U.S.
- Party: Republican
- Spouse: Elizabeth Lonick (m. 2022)
- Relatives: Dick Posthumus (father); Lisa Posthumus Lyons (sister)
- Education: Michigan State University (BS)

Bryan Richard Posthumus (born October 26, 1984) is an American politician serving as a Republican member of the Michigan House of Representatives. He was first elected in 2020 and has served in the House since 2021, representing the 73rd district from 2021 to 2022 and the 90th district since 2023. He served as Republican floor leader from 2023 to 2024 and became majority floor leader in 2025.

== Early life and education ==
Bryan Posthumus was born on October 26, 1984, in Grand Rapids, Michigan to parents Pamela and Dick Posthumus. Dick would later serve as Lieutenant Governor of Michigan. Bryan's sister Lisa Posthumus Lyons served as a state representative. Posthumus graduated from Lowell High School in 2003 and earned a bachelor's degree in agribusiness management from Michigan State University in 2007.

== Career ==
Posthumus has served as the CEO of the consulting firm Tuebor Strategies since 2010. He's additionally served vice president of business development for USA Financial and Compactio, Inc. Posthumus is a fifth-generation farmer." He's served as a managing partner of West Michigan Hopyards since 2013. Posthumas has served on the Farm Bureau.

On November 3, 2020, Posthumus was elected to the Michigan House of Representatives, where he has represented the 73rd district since January 1, 2021.

In 2022, redistricting moved Posthumus to the 90th district, where he sought re-election. Posthumus, on August 2, defeated former police officer Kathy Clark in the Republican primary. In the general election, Posthumus defeated Democratic nominee Meagan Hintz. From 2023 to 2024, Posthumus served as the Republican floor leader.

He was reelected in 2024. In 2025, Posthumus began serving as majority floor leader.

In May 2025, Posthumus was one of the representatives to introduce a four-bill package related to cryptocurrency. Posthumus claimed it was an attempt to attract the crypto industry to Michigan. According to Colin Jackson of Michigan Public, one bill would "keep the state and local governments from banning or restricting the ownership of cryptocurrencies, or taxing them any differently from regular currencies." Another bill in the package would regulate state government investment in cryptocurrency. The package would also allow select cryptocurrency miners to use abandoned oil and natural gas wells owned by the state to mine cryptocurrency.

== Personal life ==
Posthumus married for the second time in December 2022. He resides in Cannon Township, Michigan and she resides in Cascade Township.

=== Arrest and Conviction ===
On April 30, 2021, Posthumus was arrested on suspicion of drunk driving. During the incident, in Ada Township, he started to drive off-road, hit a mailbox, and then his car rolled over. At the time of the crash, his blood alcohol level was .13%, while Michigan's legal limit is .08%. On July 23, Posthumus pleaded guilty to the misdemeanor charge and was sentenced to 15 days in jail along with two years probation, 15 days of community service, and a $1,820 fine. He pledged to pay back the state for any legislative salary earned during time served. Posthumus was previously convicted for drunk driving in 2013.

Michigan House of Representatives
Preceded by Abraham Aiyash	Majority Leader of the Michigan House of Representatives; 2025–present	Incumbent
