= Johannes C. Kolderman Jr. =

American politician

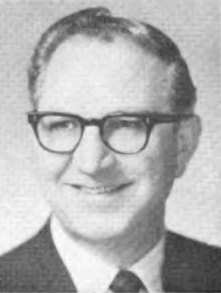

Member of the Michigan House of Representatives from the 94th district
- In office January 1, 1967 – December 31, 1968
- Preceded by: George Sietsema
- Succeeded by: Jelt Sietsema

Mayor of Wyoming, Michigan
- In office 1959–1962
- Preceded by: William Doorn
- Succeeded by: David Visser

Personal details
- Born: June 29, 1918 Grand Rapids, Michigan
- Died: 1989 (aged 70-71)
- Party: Republican

Johannes C. Kolderman Jr. (June 29, 1918 – 1989) was a Michigan politician.

== Early life ==
Kolderman was born on June 29, 1918, in Grand Rapids, Michigan.

== Career ==
Kolderman was appointed to the position of mayor of Wyoming, Michigan, in 1959 following the resignation of his predecessor, William Doorn. He served in this position until 1962. On November 8, 1966, Kolderman was elected to the Michigan House of Representatives where he represented the 94th district from January 11, 1967, to December 31, 1968. Kolderman was not re-elected in 1968.

== Personal life ==
Kolderman was married and had two children.

== Death ==
Kolderman died in 1989.
