= Joe Schwarz =

American politician (1937–2026)

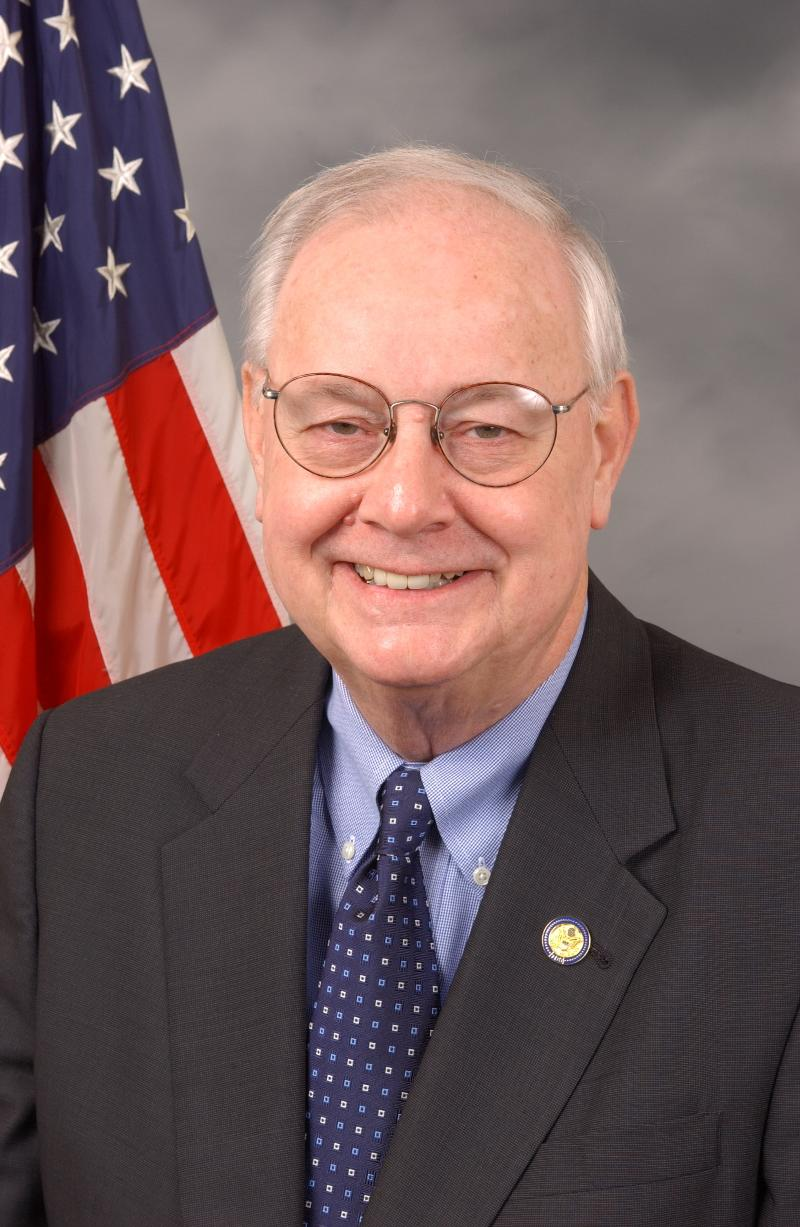
- Schwarz in 2006

Member of the U.S. House of Representatives from Michigan's 7th district
- In office January 3, 2005 – January 3, 2007
- Preceded by: Nick Smith
- Succeeded by: Tim Walberg

Member of the Michigan Senate
- In office January 1, 1987 – December 31, 2002
- Preceded by: Harry A. DeMaso
- Succeeded by: Patricia L. Birkholz
- Constituency: 20th district (1987–1994); 24th district (1995–2002)

Personal details
- Born: John Joseph Henry Schwarz; November 15, 1937 Battle Creek, Michigan, U.S.
- Died: May 27, 2026 (aged 88) Battle Creek, Michigan, U.S.
- Party: Republican (before 2010); Independent (2010–2026)
- Education: University of Michigan (BA); Wayne State University (MD)

John Joseph Henry Schwarz (November 15, 1937 – May 27, 2026) was an American physician and politician who was the U.S. representative for Michigan's 7th congressional district from 2005 to 2007.

Schwarz was first elected to Congress in 2004. He was a moderate Republican during his time in office. Schwarz's moderate voting record, especially on social issues, made him a poor fit for the conservative Republicans of the 7th congressional district, and he was defeated by Tim Walberg in the 2006 primary.

He considered running for governor of Michigan as an independent in 2010, but later announced he would not run due to fundraising issues.

== Early life and career ==
Schwarz was born and raised in Battle Creek, Michigan, after his family moved there in 1935 so his father could work as a physician in the Veterans Administration Hospital. He had two older siblings, Frank and Janet. He attended Fremont Elementary School, W.K. Kellogg Junior High School, and graduated from Battle Creek Central High School. He played on the baseball, swimming, and football teams at B.C. Central. In 1959, he received a B.A. in History from the University of Michigan, Ann Arbor, where he played on the 1956 reserve football team as a center.

He graduated from Wayne State University Medical School in 1964 and interned at Los Angeles County Hospital before enlisting in the Navy. For five years, Schwarz served in Southeast Asia, first with the U.S. Navy in Vietnam and as an assistant naval attaché in Indonesia. He was then a member of the Defense Intelligence Agency, before serving with the Central Intelligence Agency for three years in Indonesia, Laos, and Vietnam. During his time in Indonesia, Schwarz met Indonesian President Suharto on several occasions and, at then-U.S. Ambassador to Indonesia Marshall Green’s direction, taught Suharto basic English phrases for about six weeks. Following Indonesia, Schwarz was stationed with the CIA in Laos during the Laotian Civil War. Schwarz left the CIA in 1970 to attend Harvard University, finishing his residency in otolaryngology in 1973.

Schwarz returned, with his new family, to Battle Creek in 1974, and was a practicing physician in Battle Creek from that time on. At the time of his death, he saw patients at the Family Health Center in Battle Creek, a federally qualified health center. He was a Fellow of the American College of Surgeons. His first wife, Anne, died in 1990, and he was divorced from his second wife. He had one daughter from his first marriage.

== Political career ==
In 1984, Schwarz was elected Mayor of Battle Creek. In 1986, he was elected to the Michigan State Senate. In 1992, Schwarz ran for Michigan's 7th congressional district after the incumbent, Carl Pursell, retired. Schwarz was defeated by Nick Smith in the Republican primary.

In 2002, he ran for Governor of Michigan, but was defeated in the primary by a wide margin by Dick Posthumus.

In 2004, Schwarz ran again for the 7th district, following Smith's retirement. Facing five other candidates, he won with 28% of the vote. His nearest opponent would was Brad Smith, Nick Smith's son and his preferred successor. Schwarz defeated Democrat Sharon Renier in the general election.

In 2006, Schwarz voted against the Federal Marriage Amendment, which would have banned every state from legally recognizing same-sex marriage. He is considered to have been a moderate Republican who supported abortion rights and favored embryonic stem cell research.

Schwarz's moderate voting record, especially on social issues, made him a poor fit for the conservative Republicans of the 7th congressional district, and he was defeated by Tim Walberg in the 2006 primary. In 2008, Schwarz endorsed Democrat Mark Schauer over Walberg; Schauer defeated Walberg in that election, but Walberg returned to Congress after beating Schauer in a rematch in 2010.

== Post-congressional life ==
On the state level, Schwarz was appointed to Gov. Jennifer Granholm's Emergency Financial Advisory Panel, led by former Michigan governors William Milliken (R) and James Blanchard (D). On the national level, he was appointed by U.S. Secretary of Defense Robert Gates to serve on the independent panel to investigate the conditions at Walter Reed Army Hospital in suburban Washington, D.C. Schwarz was reappointed to the Altarum Institute Board of Trustees, a position he held prior to his congressional service, in February 2007. Altarum Institute is a nonprofit health policy research institute based in Ann Arbor, Michigan. He also accepted a teaching position at the University of Michigan's Gerald R. Ford School of Public Policy, which began in the fall of 2007.

In 2010, Schwarz considered running for governor of Michigan as an independent in that year's election. However, on June 2, 2010, he announced he would not run due to fundraising issues.

As of 2012, Schwarz was a member of the Michigan State Medical Society's board of directors.

On June 16, 2014, he signed a brief in support of same-sex marriage.

From 1991 to 2005 Schwarz served as a trustee for Olivet College. He also served as campaign chair for the college's capital campaign during the 2007–2009 academic years.

Schwarz died on May 27, 2026, at the age of 88.

== Electoral history ==
- 2006 Race for the U.S. House of Representatives, 7th District
  - Tim Walberg (R), 50%
  - Sharon Renier (D), 46%
  - David Horn (UST), 1%
  - Robert Hutchinson (L), 2%
  - Joe Schwarz, 1% (Write-in candidate)
- 2006 Race for the U.S. House of Representatives, 7th District – Republican Primary
  - Tim Walberg (R), 53%
  - Joe Schwarz (R) (inc.), 47%
- 2004 Race for the U.S. House of Representatives, 7th District
  - Joe Schwarz (R), 58%
  - Sharon Renier (D), 36%
- 2004 Race for the U.S. House of Representatives, 7th District – Republican Primary
  - Joe Schwarz (R), 28%
  - Brad Smith (R), 22%
  - Tim Walberg (R), 18%
  - Clark Bisbee (R), 14%
  - Gene DeRossett (R), 11%
  - Paul DeWeese (R), 7%
- 2002 Race for Governor – Republican Primary
  - Dick Posthumus (R), 81%
  - Joe Schwarz (R), 19%

U.S. House of Representatives
Preceded by Nick Smith	Member of the U.S. House of Representatives from Michigan's 7th congressional district 2005–2007	Succeeded by Tim Walberg
