= Alvin J. DeGrow =

American politician

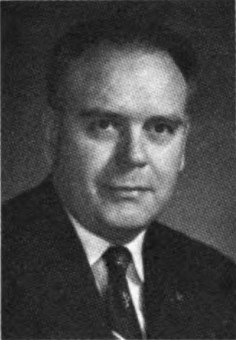

Member of the Michigan Senate from the 28th district
- In office 1968 – December 31, 1982
- Preceded by: Frank D. Beadle
- Succeeded by: Dan DeGrow

Personal details
- Born: June 1, 1926 Pigeon, Michigan
- Died: June 2, 2016 (aged 90)
- Party: Republican
- Spouse: Judith

Military service
- Branch/service: United States Navy
- Battles/wars: World War II

Alvin J. DeGrow (June 1, 1926 – June 2, 2016) was a Republican member of the Michigan Senate, representing a portion of the Thumb from 1968 through 1982.

After graduating from Pigeon High School in 1944, DeGrow served in the United States Navy during World War II, seeing action in the Asiatic-Pacific Theater as a quartermaster third class aboard a tank landing ship. Upon returning to Michigan, DeGrow married Judith Haist in 1946. Five years later, he became the owner and operator of the Ben Franklin store in Pigeon.

DeGrow was involved in Rotary International as the local chapter president and district governor. His first involvement in politics was being elected to the Tri-County Community College board. In 1968, he was elected in a special election to serve in the state Senate. DeGrow was elected to a full term in 1970 and served through 1982. DeGrow was recognized for forging compromises and developing solutions to complex problems. Upon retirement from the Legislature, he founded a lobbying firm with two Senate colleagues, retiring from that in 1989.

After leaving the Senate, his cousin Dan DeGrow succeeded him.

DeGrow died the day following his 90th birthday, on June 2, 2016.
