= Dick Posthumus =

American politician

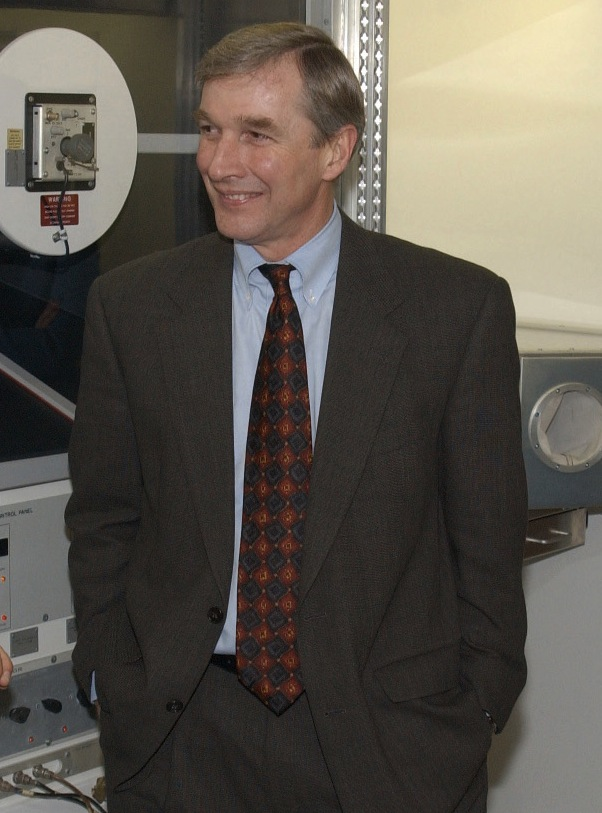
- Posthumus in 2002

61st Lieutenant Governor of Michigan
- In office January 1, 1999 – January 1, 2003
- Governor: John Engler
- Preceded by: Connie Binsfeld
- Succeeded by: John Cherry

Majority Leader of the Michigan Senate
- In office January 1, 1991 – January 1, 1999
- Preceded by: John Engler
- Succeeded by: Dan DeGrow

Member of the Michigan Senate from the 31st district
- In office January 1, 1983 – January 1, 1999
- Preceded by: Robert VanderLaan
- Succeeded by: Ken Sikkema

Personal details
- Born: Richard Posthumus; July 19, 1950 (age 76) Alto, Michigan, U.S.
- Party: Republican
- Spouse(s): Pam Bartz (m. 1972; died 2010) Beth Mihlethaler (m. 2011)
- Children: 4, including Bryan and Lisa
- Education: Michigan State University (BA)

Richard Posthumus (/ˈpɑːstjuːməs/; born July 19, 1950) is an American businessman, and politician. He was the 61st lieutenant governor of Michigan and majority leader of the Michigan Senate. In 2002, he was the unsuccessful Republican nominee for Governor of Michigan.

== Biography ==
Posthumus grew up on a dairy farm in Alto, Michigan, outside of Grand Rapids. He graduated from Michigan State University, during which he served as chairman of the College Republicans and as a vice chairman of the Michigan Republican Party.

In 1971, he managed the successful Michigan House of Representatives campaign of fellow student and future Michigan governor John Engler. Posthumus was elected to the Senate in 1982 and became majority leader in 1990, when Engler was elected governor. His 1982 campaign was managed by Saul Anuzis. Posthumus was the longest serving majority leader in the history of the Senate.

Posthumus joined Engler on as his running mate and candidate for lieutenant governor in 1998 and went on to serve in that post for four years. He was the Republican nominee for governor in 2002, having defeated Joe Schwarz in the Republican primary, but lost to Democrat Jennifer Granholm in the general election. He joined Compatico in 2005 and became the chief executive officer in 2006.

On November 8, 2010, Governor-elect Rick Snyder named Posthumus to be his senior adviser and legislative lobbyist.

== Personal life ==
Posthumus married Pamela "Pam" (née Bartz) in 1972. They had four children together, and seven grandchildren. Pam died of cancer on August 18, 2010. Posthumus married Beth Ann (née Mihlethaler) Fogg on September 24, 2011. Dick's son, Bryan, is a Michigan state representative, and advocate for Alcoholic's Anonymous and Dick's daughter, Lisa, is a Republican member of the Michigan House of Representatives.

== Electoral history ==
- 2002 election for Governor
  - Jennifer Granholm (D), 51%
  - Dick Posthumus (R), 47%
- 2002 election for Governor – Republican Primary
  - Dick Posthumus (R), 81%
  - Joe Schwarz (R), 19%

== See also ==
- List of Michigan state legislatures

Political offices
Preceded by Connie Binsfeld	Lieutenant Governor of Michigan; 1999–2003	Succeeded by John Cherry
Michigan Senate
Preceded by John Engler	Majority Leader of the Michigan Senate; 1991–1999	Succeeded by Dan DeGrow
Party political offices
Preceded by Connie Binsfeld	Republican nominee for Lieutenant Governor of Michigan; 1998	Succeeded by Loren Bennett
Preceded by John Engler	Republican nominee for Governor of Michigan; 2002	Succeeded by Dick DeVos
