= Joe Conroy =

American politician (born 1934)

Member of the Michigan Senate
- In office January 1, 1983 – December 31, 1998
- Preceded by: Gary G. Corbin
- Succeeded by: Dianne Byrum
- Constituency: 25th district (1983–1994); 29th district (1995–1998)

Member of the Michigan House of Representatives from the 79th district
- In office January 1, 1977 – December 31, 1982
- Preceded by: F. Robert Edwards
- Succeeded by: John D. Cherry

Personal details
- Born: July 24, 1934 (age 91) Battle Creek, Michigan
- Party: Democratic
- Spouse: Mary Ann

Joe Conroy (born July 24, 1934) is a Democratic former member of both houses of the Michigan Legislature, representing parts of Genesee County for two decades.

Prior to his election to the House, Conroy was active in real estate and building in the Flint area. He was also a member of the city's charter review commission and the county board of commissioners. He was elected to the Michigan House of Representatives in 1976 and served three terms. He sought and won election to the Michigan Senate in 1982 and served there for four terms. While in the Senate, he served on the Appropriations Committee.

Conroy was governmental operations director under former Mayor Don Williamson of Flint for four and a half years, resigning in 2008.
