= Mike Rogers (Michigan politician) =

American politician (born 1963)

- Rogers in 2019

Chair of the House Intelligence Committee
- In office January 3, 2011 – January 3, 2015
- Preceded by: Silvestre Reyes
- Succeeded by: Devin Nunes

Member of the U.S. House of Representatives from Michigan's 8th district
- In office January 3, 2001 – January 3, 2015
- Preceded by: Debbie Stabenow
- Succeeded by: Mike Bishop

Member of the Michigan Senate from the 26th district
- In office January 1, 1995 – January 3, 2001
- Preceded by: Gilbert DiNello
- Succeeded by: Valde Garcia

Personal details
- Born: Michael Joseph Rogers; June 2, 1963 (age 63) Livonia, Michigan, U.S.
- Party: Republican
- Spouse(s): Diane Rogers (m. 1990; div. 2007) Kristi Clemens (m. 2010)
- Children: 2
- Relatives: Bill Rogers (brother)
- Education: Adrian College (BS)
- Website: Campaign website

Military service
- Branch/service: United States Army
- Years of service: 1985–1989
- Rank: First Lieutenant
- Unit: 7th Infantry Division
- Rogers's voice Rogers opening a House Intelligence Committee hearing on NSA data collection. Recorded June 18, 2013

Michael Joseph Rogers (born June 2, 1963) is an American politician and former Federal Bureau of Investigation (FBI) agent who from 2001 to 2015 was the U.S. representative for Michigan's 8th congressional district. A member of the Republican Party, he chaired the United States House Permanent Select Committee on Intelligence from 2011 to 2015.

Rogers was the Republican nominee in the 2024 U.S. Senate election in Michigan, losing narrowly to Democrat Elissa Slotkin. He was again the nominee in the 2026 election and lost to Democrat Abdul El-Sayed by seven percentage points.

== Early life ==
Rogers was born on June 2, 1963, in Livonia, Michigan, to Joyce A. and John C. Rogers. His family moved to Brighton Township, where he graduated from Howell High School in 1981. Rogers graduated from Adrian College in 1985 with a bachelor's degree in criminal justice and sociology. He served in the United States Army from 1985 to 1989.

From 1989 to 1994, Rogers worked as a special agent with the Federal Bureau of Investigation in its Chicago office, investigating organized crime.

== Michigan Senate ==
Elected in 1994, Rogers was reelected in 1998 with 68% of the vote. As a state senator, he was the primary sponsor of legislation that established the Michigan Education Savings Program to provide a tax-free way to save money for education.

== U.S. House of Representatives ==
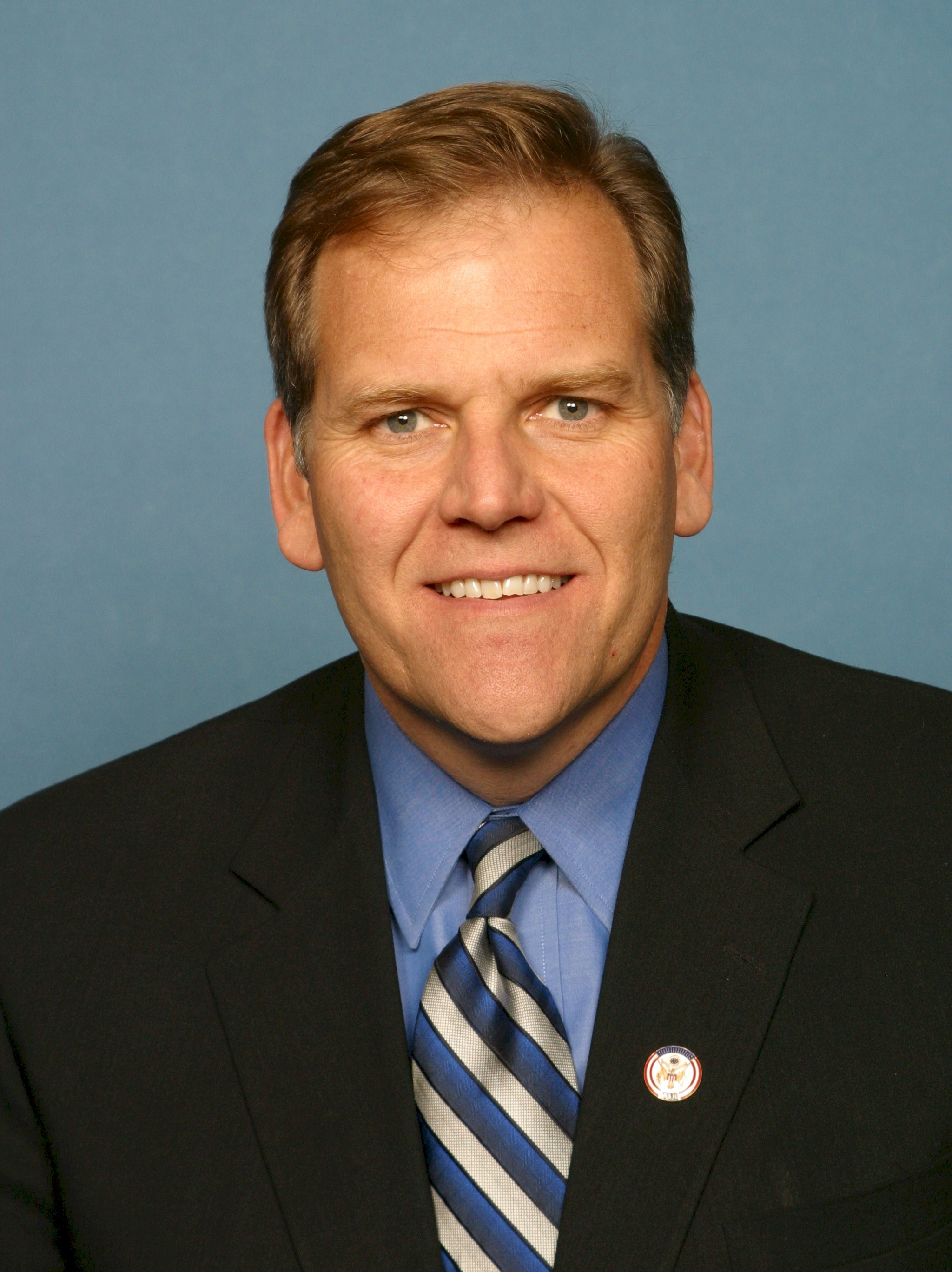
Rogers's official portrait, 2005

=== Elections ===
Rogers was elected to the United States House of Representatives from Michigan's 8th district in one of the nation's closest congressional races of 2000. He defeated Democratic State Senator Dianne Byrum by 111 votes.

=== Tenure ===
Rogers sponsored the Respect for America's Fallen Heroes Act, H.R. 5037, which President George W. Bush signed into law on May 29, 2006. The CBO said that Rogers's H.R. 1206 to make it easier for states to obtain waivers from some Medical Loss Ratio requirements would add $1.1 billion to the deficit between 2013 and 2022.

On November 30, 2011, Rogers introduced the Cyber Intelligence Sharing and Protection Act (CISPA). He introduced the Intelligence Authorization Act for Fiscal Years 2014 and 2015, which authorized a variety of intelligence agencies and their appropriations for fiscal years 2014 and 2015. In March 2014, Rogers announced he would not seek an eighth House term.

=== Committee assignments ===
- Committee on Energy and Commerce
  - Subcommittee on Communications and Technology
  - Subcommittee on Health
- Permanent Select Committee on Intelligence (Chairman)

== U.S. Senate campaigns ==
=== 2024 ===
In August 2023, Rogers announced his candidacy for the U.S. Senate to succeed the retiring Democrat Debbie Stabenow. He won the Republican primary with over 60% of the vote on August 6, 2024, and was the Republican nominee in the general election. He lost to Democratic nominee Elissa Slotkin in the general election by fewer than 20,000 votes, while Donald Trump won the state in the concurrent presidential election by just over 80,000 votes.

=== 2026 ===
On April 14, 2025, Rogers announced his candidacy for the seat being vacated by retiring Senator Gary Peters. Running unopposed, he won the Republican primary on August 4, 2026. His opponent was Democratic nominee Abdul El-Sayed.

In August, Rogers said El-Sayed had "pledged his support to the Muslim Brotherhood" and later alleged his campaign was funded by "terrorist groups like the Muslim Brotherhood"; fact-checkers found both claims unsupported. In an October 18 CNN interview, he declined to comment on Trump's characterization of El-Sayed as a "jihadist", saying he had never called El-Sayed a terrorist and repeating the Muslim Brotherhood claim.

Rogers and El-Sayed participated in debates on October 8 and October 21. The first was combative, with the candidates frequently talking over each other, while the second focused more on policy. Topics included the economy, tariffs, immigration, the Iran war, and health care. They also exchanged personal attacks, with Rogers repeating his allegations and questioning his use of the title "doctor", while El-Sayed accused Rogers of profiting from public office and criticized his positions on Trump.

Trump, who endorsed Rogers in July 2025, spoke at his rally in Port Huron, Michigan on October 25, 2026. Rogers pledged to "stand with" Trump and deliver on his mandate.

On November 1, 2026, Haley Stevens, who lost to El-Sayed in the Democratic primary, endorsed Rogers. Her break with El-Sayed reflected personal animosity and differing views on Israel.

On November 3, 2026, Rogers lost the race to El-Sayed by about 340,000 votes, or seven percentage points. On November 4, Rogers released a statement of thanks to supporters, which the Associated Press reported as a concession but some outlets concluded did not explicitly concede the race. On November 7, El-Sayed said Rogers had not yet called to concede the race.

== Political positions ==
Rogers in November 2019

During his tenure in the House, Rogers was known as a conservative with a hawkish view on national security. A former critic of Donald Trump after the 2020 presidential election, Rogers became closely aligned with Trump during the Senate campaigns.

=== Abortion ===
Rogers opposes abortion. In Congress he had a consistent anti-abortion voting record, receiving a 100% rating from the National Right to Life Committee and a 0% rating from NARAL Pro-Choice America in each term from 2001 to 2014. In October 2023, Rogers said he supported the U.S. Supreme Court's 2022 decision Dobbs v. Jackson Women's Health Organization, which overturned Roe v. Wade.

In 2024, Rogers said he would not attempt to change Michigan's 2022 constitutional amendment protecting legal access to abortion, saying the issue should be left to the states. In 2026, he said he supports access to abortion in cases of rape, incest, and saving the mother's life, and would not support a federal abortion ban.

=== Chronic pain ===
In Congress, Rogers was an advocate for chronic pain awareness and increased access to pain treatment, including medications such as opioids. From 2003 to 2009, he introduced or co-sponsored four versions of the National Pain Care Policy Act, which called for raising the profile of chronic pain as a public health issue, improving training for health professionals, and expanding access to treatment. Parts of the bill were later incorporated into President Obama's 2010 Affordable Care Act.

=== Data centers ===
Rogers has called for a one-year moratorium on data centers in Michigan pending the creation of a "fair, transparent approval process." He does not support a federal ban on data centers.

=== Economic policy ===
Rogers initially supported Trump's tariffs but says trade is not "one-size-fits-all" and has called for an end to the trade war with Canada. He has said the main factor driving higher housing and consumer costs is high interest rates that could be reduced by "reining in outsized federal spending".

=== Elections ===
After the 2020 presidential election, Rogers called Trump's attempts to overturn the election "very corrosive". In a November 2020 op-ed in The Detroit News, he said Trump was "violating norms of behavior and setting a dangerous precedent" and that, barring evidence to the contrary, the election was held "freely, fairly, and openly" and Biden should be certified as the winner. In a June 2024 interview with the Detroit Free Press editorial board, he declined to say who had won the 2020 election.

In 2021, after the January 6 United States Capitol attack, Rogers said Trump had clearly provoked the attack and bore responsibility. In 2024, he told CNN, "I didn't say he was clearly responsible."

Rogers supports the SAVE Act, which would require documentary proof of citizenship to register to vote in federal elections and photo identification at the polls.

=== Foreign policy ===
In 2002, Rogers voted to authorize the invasion of Iraq.

In 2010, Rogers called for the execution of 22-year-old American Army soldier Chelsea Manning after she leaked diplomatic cables, American war documents about Afghanistan, and footage of an American war crime in Baghdad. Rogers said she "clearly aided the enemy ... If that is not a capital offense, I don't know what is."

==== Canada ====
As a congressman, Rogers opposed the construction of the Gordie Howe International Bridge connecting Detroit and Windsor. Instead, he supported the construction of a second Ambassador Bridge span, which Canada opposed. In 2026, Rogers supported Trump's threats to keep the Gordie Howe International Bridge between Michigan and Canada from opening. Rogers said it would be useful as part of the trade war with Canada during the second Trump administration. In October 2026, he called for an end to the trade war with Canada, saying "Canada is not our enemy."

==== Iran ====
Rogers supported Trump's decision to launch strikes on Iran during the June 2025 Twelve-Day War.

In February 2026, Rogers supported the 2026 Iran war. In March 2026, Rogers initially said of the war's impact on gas prices, "We're gonna be fine; we got plenty of oil". He said, "You'll get your oil, because we're going to pump our oil right here in America, and we got plenty." Rogers's 2026 Senate campaign said the resulting 2026 Strait of Hormuz crisis underscored the necessity of energy independence. In June 2026, Rogers said he supported the then ongoing negotiations under the auspices of the 60-day Islamabad Memorandum, which expired in August. He related the memorandum of understanding (MoU) to decreased gas and fertilizer prices. In August, Rogers said Trump had the authority to continue the war without congressional approval, but that he should pursue that approval regardless: "The commander-in-chief has the authority and the ability to do a lot of what he's doing. I just think working with the legislature is probably a better idea."

In September, Rogers called for the war to end quickly, blaming it for high energy prices. In October, he said he did not want immediate U.S. military withdrawal and that it was too soon to tell whether going to war with Iran had been a mistake, but that he did not think so.

==== Israel ====
Rogers is a longtime supporter of Israel and AIPAC. In August 2025, he defended Israel's right to defend itself and criticized opposition to its conduct in the Gaza war. In August 2026, Rogers attended four fundraisers hosted by AIPAC, a pro-Israel lobby group, in Los Angeles. His allies explored ways for the organization and its donors to support his campaign without publicly highlighting AIPAC's involvement fearing it could hurt his chances.

=== Health care ===
In 2011, Rogers voted to bar federal funding for Planned Parenthood. Rogers has called for ending key provisions of the Affordable Care Act, and opposed extended subsidies for the Affordable Care Act. Rogers also voted against the James Zadroga 9/11 Health and Compensation Act, legislation that provided health care and compensation to 9/11 first responders and survivors. He opposes Medicare for All, saying it would end private health insurance and lead to higher taxes.

=== Immigration ===
Rogers has long supported strict immigration laws. In 2024, Rogers blamed open borders for increases in crime in the United States and said that he supported a border wall and increased immigration enforcement.

=== LGBTQ rights ===
In Congress, Rogers voted for the 2004 Federal Marriage Amendment, which would have banned same-sex marriage. In 2010, he voted against repealing "don't ask, don't tell", the military's ban on openly gay service members. In 2023, Rogers said his position on same-sex marriage had "evolved" and that he accepted it as law. He said he supported Michigan state legislation to prevent housing and job discrimination against LGBTQ people.

In 2024, Rogers opposed Title IX regulations introduced during the Biden administration that expanded protections against discrimination based on sexual orientation and gender identity. He also opposed allowing transgender athletes to compete in women's sports.

== Post-congressional career ==
After leaving Congress, Rogers worked in the cybersecurity industry.

In early 2015, he launched "Something to Think About", a daily radio segment, and joined CNN as a national security commentator. In 2016 and 2017, he also worked as a sales consultant for AT&T's managed cybersecurity unit. He hosted the CNN syndicated talk show Something to Think About with Mike Rogers and the 2016-2019 series Declassified.

Rogers sat on the board of IronNet, a now defunct cybersecurity firm that went public in 2021 and was founded by former NSA head Keith B. Alexander. Rogers is on Telefónica's Technical and Security Advisory Committee and is a board member of IP3 International and a member of Antonin Scalia Law School's National Security Institute advisory board. Rogers was also a non-resident senior fellow at the Belfer Center for Science and International Affairs.

He was on the board of the Mitre Corporation from 2016 to 2023, and was elected its chairman in 2021.

== Personal life ==
Rogers has two children from his marriage to Diane Rogers, which ended in divorce in 2007 after 17 years. As of 2026, Rogers is married to Kristi Rogers, founder of Partnerships Revolutionizing International Supply Chain Modernization, an energy and mining trade group. Rogers's older brother Bill was a state representative in Michigan.

In 2022, Rogers purchased a home in Cape Coral, Florida, before moving back to Michigan ahead of his 2024 run for the U.S. Senate.

U.S. House of Representatives
Preceded by Debbie Stabenow	Member of the U.S. House of Representatives from Michigan's 8th congressional district 2001–2015	Succeeded by Mike Bishop
Preceded by Silvestre Reyes	Chair of the House Intelligence Committee; 2011–2015	Succeeded by Devin Nunes
Party political offices
Preceded by John James	Republican nominee for U.S. Senator from Michigan (Class 1); 2024	Most recent
Preceded by John James	Republican nominee for U.S. Senator from Michigan (Class 2); 2026	Most recent
U.S. order of precedence (ceremonial)
Preceded by Vic Snyder as Former U.S. Representative	Order of precedence of the United States as Former U.S. Representative	Succeeded by Porter Goss as Former U.S. Representative
