= Jelt Sietsema =

American politician (1921–2005)

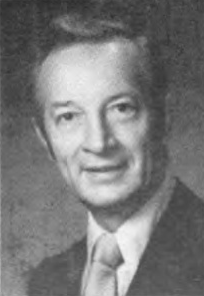

Member of the Michigan House of Representatives from the 94th district
- In office January 1, 1969 – December 31, 1986
- Preceded by: Johannes Kolderman
- Succeeded by: Ken Sikkema

Personal details
- Born: May 7, 1921 Grand Rapids, Michigan
- Died: January 29, 2005 (aged 83)
- Resting place: Grandville, Michigan
- Party: Democratic
- Spouse: Betty

Military service
- Allegiance: United States
- Branch/service: United States Army
- Years of service: 1942–1945
- Rank: Staff sergeant
- Battles/wars: World War II

Jelt Sietsema (May 7, 1921 – January 29, 2005) was a Democratic member of the Michigan House of Representatives, representing part of Kent County from 1969 through 1986.

== Early life ==
A native of Grand Rapids, Sietsema was a veteran of World War II serving in the European Theater. He attended Radio Electronics Television School, and married Betty Jean Eastman in 1948.

== Political career ==
Sietsema won election to the House in 1968, defeating the incumbent Johannes Kolderman. He went on to serve nine terms. While in the House, Sietsema sponsored legislation requiring curbs to be cut to accommodate wheelchairs.

Along with 14 colleagues, he drew the ire of his caucus in the early 1980s over cutting workers' compensation rates.

Sietsema was defeated for re-election in 1986 by Ken Sikkema.

== Later life ==
After leaving the House, Sietsema won election to the Kent County Board of Commissioners where he served four terms.

Sietsema died on January 29, 2005, aged 83.
