= Ken Sikkema =

American politician

Majority Leader of the Michigan Senate
- In office January 1, 2003 – January 1, 2007
- Preceded by: Dan DeGrow
- Succeeded by: Mike Bishop

Member of the Michigan Senate
- In office January 1, 1999 – January 1, 2007
- Preceded by: Dick Posthumus
- Succeeded by: Mark C. Jansen
- Constituency: 31st district (1999–2002); 28th district (2003–2006)

Member of the Michigan House of Representatives
- In office January 1, 1987 – December 31, 1998
- Preceded by: Jelt Sietsema
- Succeeded by: James L. Koetje
- Constituency: 94th district (1987–1992); 74th district (1993–1998)

Personal details
- Born: February 10, 1951 (age 75) Cadillac, Michigan
- Party: Republican
- Spouse: Carla
- Education: University of Michigan (M.B.A.); Harvard University (B.A.)

Kenneth R. Sikkema (born February 10, 1951) is a Republican politician from Michigan who served in both houses of the Michigan Legislature between 1987 and 2006 representing areas in and around Grand Rapids.

Sikkema served as Republican Leader in the House in the 89th Legislature, and as the Majority Leader of the Senate in the 92nd and 93rd Legislatures.

== See also ==
- List of Michigan state legislatures

Michigan Senate
| Preceded by Dan DeGrow | Majority Leader of the Michigan Senate; 2003–2007 | Succeeded by Mike Bishop |
