= John D. Cherry =

American politician (born 1951)

John Cherry
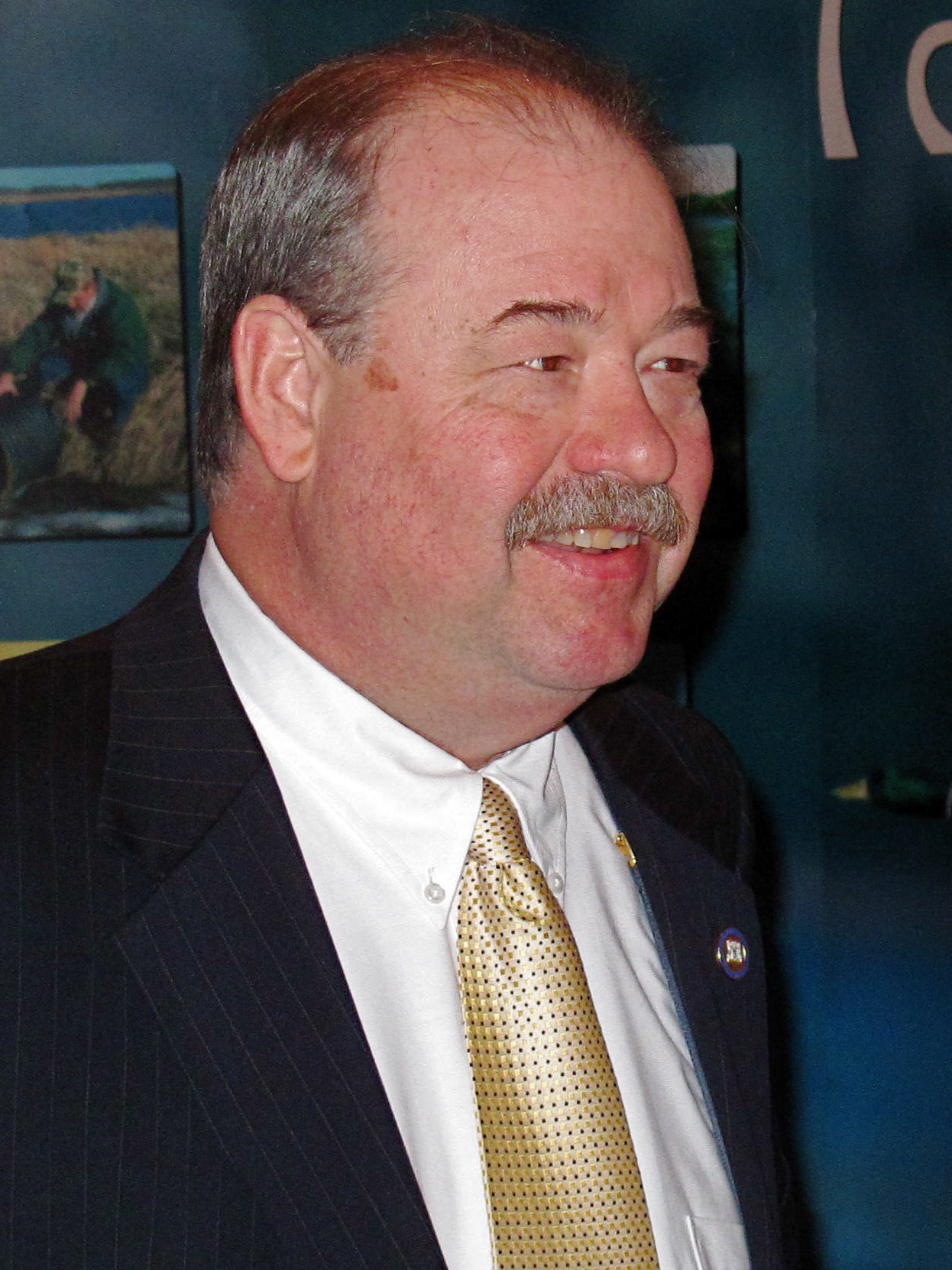
- Cherry in 2009

62nd Lieutenant Governor of Michigan
- In office January 1, 2003 – January 1, 2011
- Governor: Jennifer Granholm
- Preceded by: Dick Posthumus
- Succeeded by: Brian Calley

47th Chair of the National Lieutenant Governors Association
- In office 2006–2007
- Preceded by: Jane Norton
- Succeeded by: Jack Dalrymple

Member of the Michigan Senate
- In office January 11, 1995 – 2003
- Preceded by: Dan L. DeGrow
- Succeeded by: Kenneth R. Sikkema
- Constituency: 28th district
- In office January 14, 1987 – 1995
- Preceded by: Gary George Corbin
- Succeeded by: Joe Conroy
- Constituency: 29th district

Member of the Michigan House of Representatives from the 79th district
- In office January 12, 1983 – 1986
- Preceded by: Joe Conroy
- Succeeded by: Nate Jonker

Personal details
- Born: May 5, 1951 (age 75) Sulphur Springs, Texas, U.S.
- Party: Democratic
- Spouse: Pam Faris
- Children: 2; including John Cherry III
- Education: University of Michigan (BA); University of Michigan–Flint (MPA)

John D. Cherry Jr. (born May 5, 1951) is an American politician who served as the 62nd lieutenant governor of Michigan from 2003 to 2011. A Democrat, Cherry also served as a gubernatorial appointee to the Midwestern Higher Education Compact, and was the immediate past chair of the international Great Lakes Commission (of which he is still a member).

Cherry was an announced candidate for Governor of Michigan in 2010. However, on January 5, he announced his withdrawal from the race, citing an inability to "secure enough money to make my candidacy fully viable."

== Early life and education ==
Cherry grew up in Montrose, Michigan, and graduated from Hill-McCloy High School 1969. Cherry earned a Bachelor of Arts degree in political science from the University of Michigan in 1973 and a Master of Public Administration from the University of Michigan–Flint in 1984. He is of Polish and Scots-Irish descent.

== Career ==
A former staff member to Michigan State Senator Gary Corbin, Cherry served as the state political director for the American Federation of State, County, and Municipal Employees, until 1982. He was then elected to the Michigan Legislature as a State Representative (1983–1986), State Senator (1987–2002) and Senate Minority Leader.

Cherry was elected in 2002 as the running mate of Democrat Jennifer Granholm, passing on his state senate seat to his sister Deborah Cherry. As the lieutenant governor, John Cherry presided over the State Senate, casting votes there in the event of a tie.

As lieutenant governor, John Cherry was elected chairman of the National Lieutenant Governors Association (NLGA) in July 2006. John Cherry also chaired the Lt. Governor’s Commission on Higher Education & Economic Growth, with the commission making recommendations on higher education and the need to expand Michigan's job base. The Cherry Commission report led to the Michigan Promise scholarship, the No Worker Left Behind program, and Michigan replacing the high school MEAP exam with the ACT. Michigan also increased standards in the K-12 curriculum and graduation requirements consistent with the Commission's recommendations.

Cherry has been awarded Honorary Doctor of Laws degree from Saginaw Valley State University and an Honorary Doctor of Public Service degree from Central Michigan University. He has earned several awards including being recognized as "one of Michigan’s Most Effective Legislators" by The Detroit News and the 2005 Conservationist of the Year by the Michigan United Conservation Clubs.Cherry serves as the Chairman of the St. Andrew's Society of Detroit's Board of Trustees 2016 to present. Cherry serves as the Vice-President of the Council of Scottish Clans and Associations 2016 to present, and as President of the Clan MacLachlan Association of North America 2014 to present.

== Personal life ==
Cherry is married to former State Representative Pam Faris. They have two adult children, Meghan and John Daniel, and four grandchildren.

Party political offices
Preceded by Jim Agee	Democratic nominee for Lieutenant Governor of Michigan; 2002, 2006	Succeeded by Brenda Lawrence
Political offices
Preceded by Dick Posthumus	Lieutenant Governor of Michigan; 2003–2011	Succeeded by Brian Calley
