= Dan DeGrow =

American politician (born 1953)

Dan L. DeGrow

Majority Leader of the Michigan Senate
- In office January 13, 1999 – December 30, 2002
- Governor: John Engler
- Preceded by: Dick Posthumus
- Succeeded by: Ken Sikkema

Member of the Michigan Senate
- In office January 1, 1983 – January 1, 2003
- Preceded by: Alvin J. DeGrow
- Succeeded by: Robert L. Emerson
- Constituency: 28th district (1983–1994); 27th district (1995–2003)

Member of the Michigan House of Representatives from the 76th district
- In office January 1, 1981 – December 31, 1982
- Preceded by: William L. Jowett
- Succeeded by: James A. Docherty

Personal details
- Born: June 28, 1953 (age 73) Ann Arbor, Michigan, U.S.
- Party: Republican
- Spouse: Cheryl
- Education: Wayne State University (JD); Michigan State University; St. Clair County Community College

Dan L. DeGrow (born June 28, 1953) was the former superintendent of the St. Clair County RESA, and a Republican former member of both houses of the Michigan Legislature, serving portions of the Thumb for just over two decades.

DeGrow was elected to the Michigan House of Representatives in 1980 and served one term. In 1982, he was elected to the Michigan Senate and served for 20 years. DeGrow was named the chamber's majority leader in 1999. When he was forced from office due to the state's term limits, he was recognized for his "outstanding leadership" during a "most impressive tenure of commitment to the people of this state."

During his tenure, he was recognized with a number of awards, including being named legislator of the year by three organizations, and twice voted one of the ten best legislators by The Detroit News.

Upon leaving the Senate, DeGrow became superintendent of the St. Clair County Regional Educational Service Agency.

Michigan Senate
Preceded by Dick Posthumus	Majority Leader of the Michigan Senate; 1999–2003	Succeeded by Ken Sikkema
