= Forest Hills Public Schools =

School district in Michigan

Address
- 620 Forest Hill Ave. SE Grand Rapids, Kent, Michigan, 49546; United States

District information
- Type: Public
- Grades: PreK–12
- Superintendent: Ben Kirby
- Schools: 18
- Budget: $173,197,000 2022-2023 expenditures
- NCES District ID: 2614610

Students and staff
- Students: 8,838 (2024–2025)
- Teachers: 522.28 (on an FTE basis) (2024-2025)
- Staff: 986.49 FTE (2024-2025)
- Student–teacher ratio: 16.92 (2024-2025)

Other information
- Website: www.fhps.net

Forest Hills Public Schools (FHPS) is a public school district in the Grand Rapids, Michigan area. It serves portions of the townships of Ada, Cascade, Cannon and Grand Rapids and portions of the cities of Grand Rapids and Kentwood in Kent County. This area is roughly approximated for statistical purposes by the census-designated place Forest Hills.

== History ==
Several primary school districts east of Grand Rapids consolidated in 1956 to form the district. The name Forest Hills was chosen by the school board in August 1956 from submissions from a citizens' advisory committee. The district began operation in fall 1956 with eight school buildings.

Prior to consolidation, districts within the present district's boundaries sent students to other districts' high schools. The district's own first high school, now known as Forest Hills Central High School, opened in fall 1958. Forest Hills Northern High School, designed by Battle Creek architect Guido A. Binda and Associates, opened in fall 1972. Forest Hills Eastern High School and Middle School opened in fall 2004 and the architect was URS Corporation.

In 1999, Goodwillie Environmental School was founded. With a donation from Jim and Mary Goodwillie Nelson, a permanent building opened in fall 2001, the first LEED-certified school in the world. The school, which has about 100 students in fifth and sixth grades, uses an application and lottery-based enrollment system to ensure students are compatible with the rustic outdoor-based curriculum. Unique activities at the school include an environmental-science focus, daily outdoor lunch, raising chickens, and several overnight camps.

== District schools ==
Forest Hills Public Schools
School	Address	Notes
Elementary schools
Ada Elementary School	731 Ada Drive SE, Ada	Grades PreK-4
Ada Vista Elementary School	7192 Bradfield SE, Ada	Grades K-4. Spanish-language immersion school.
Collins Elementary School	4368 Heather Lane SE, Grand Rapids	Grades PreK-4
Knapp Forest Elementary School	4243 Knapp Valley Dr., Grand Rapids	Grades PreK-5
Meadow Brook Elementary School	1450 Forest Hill Ave. SE, Grand Rapids	Grades K-4
Orchard View Elementary School	2770 Leffingwell Ave. NE, Grand Rapids	Grades PreK-5
Pine Ridge Elementary School	3250 Redford St. SE, Grand Rapids	Grades PreK-4
Thornapple Elementary School	6932 Bridgewater Dr. SE, Grand Rapids	Grades PreK-4
Middle and intermediate schools
Central Woodlands 5/6 School	400 Alta Dale Ave. SE, Ada	Grades 5-6
Northern Trails 5/6 School	3777 Leonard St. NE, Grand Rapids	Grades 5-6
Goodwillie Environmental School	8400 Two Mile Rd. NE, Ada	Grades 5-6. Outdoor/nature education school. Enrollment based on application/lottery.
Central Middle School	5810 Ada Dr. SE, Ada	Grades 7-8
Eastern Middle School	2200 Pettis Ave. NE, Ada	Grades 6-8. Shares a building with Forest Hills Eastern High School.
Northern Hills Middle School	3775 Leonard St. NE, Grand Rapids	Grades 7-8
High schools
Forest Hills Central High School	5901 Hall St. SE, Grand Rapids	Grades 9-12
Forest Hills Northern High School	3801 Leonard St. NE, Grand Rapids	Grades 9-12
Forest Hills Eastern High School	2200 Pettis Ave. NE, Ada	Grades 9-12. Shares a building with Forest Hills Eastern Middle School.
Dr. J. Michael Washburn Campus
Transition Center	640 Forest Hill Ave. SE, Grand Rapids	Program for young adults with developmental disabilities who have completed high school.
Community and Aquatic Center	660 Forest Hill Ave. SE, Grand Rapids	Pool and meeting center for community use, opened 1990.
Fine Arts Center	600 Forest Hill Ave. SE, Grand Rapids	1,200-seat auditorium in a stand-alone building.

== Notable alumni ==
- Chris Afendoulis, former Republican Member of the Michigan House of Representatives
- Johnny Benson Jr., NASCAR racing driver
- Dick DeVos, former CEO of Amway and former Michigan gubernatorial candidate
- Lauren Kozal, National Women's Soccer League (NWSL) goalkeeper
- Bryson Kuzdzal, Michigan Wolverines football player
- Mitch Lyons, National Football League (NFL) tight end
- Aidan O'Connor, Major League Soccer defender
- Steve Scheffler, National Basketball Association (NBA) player
- Jared Veldheer, National Football League (NFL) offensive tackle
- Kyle Visser, former NCAA college basketball scholarship athlete (Wake Forest University)
- Gretchen Whitmer, 49th Governor of Michigan
- Kim Zimmer, actress
