= Ottawa-Kent Conference =

Sports league

The Ottawa-Kent Conference is an athletic league located in West Michigan. Its current leader is David VanNoord. It has member schools from Allegan, Ionia, Kent, Montcalm, Muskegon, and Ottawa Counties. It has 48 member schools that partake in athletics. According to the MHSAA they have the main offices located at Grandville High School.

== Members ==
List of member of the Ottawa-Kent Conference
School	Mascot	Affiliation	Class	Enrollment	County	Year Admitted	Division
Belding	Black Knights	Public	B	538	Ionia	1995	Silver
Byron Center	Bulldogs	Public	A	1324	Kent	1958#	White
Caledonia	Fighting Scots	Public	A	1431	Kent	1970	Red
Comstock Park	Panthers	Public	B	530	Kent	1970	Silver
East Grand Rapids	Pioneers	Public	A	909	Kent	1970	White
East Kentwood	Falcons	Public	A	2906	Kent	1961	Red
Forest Hills Central	Rangers	Public	A	1049	Kent	1960	White
Forest Hills Eastern	Hawks	Public	B	801	Kent	2005	Gold
Forest Hills Northern	Huskies	Public	A	1142	Kent	1972	White
Fruitport	Trojans	Public	B	794	Muskegon	2016	Blue
Godwin Heights	Wolverines	Public	B	662	Kent	1967	Silver
Grand Rapids Catholic Central	Cougars	Private	B	584	Kent	2008	Gold
Grand Rapids Christian	Eagles	Private	B	754	Kent	2008	White
Grand Rapids Ottawa Hills	Bengals	Public	A	1132	Kent	2008	Gold
Grand Rapids Union	Red Hawks	Public	A	1924	Kent	2008	Green
Grand Rapids West Catholic	Falcons	Private	B	484	Kent	2008	Blue
Grand Haven	Buccaneers	Public	A	1882	Ottawa	1985	Red
Grandville	Bulldogs	Public	A	1752	Kent	1970	Red
Grandville Calvin Christian	Squires	Private	C	261	Kent	1975	Silver
Hamilton	Hawkeyes	Public	B	764	Allegan	1970	Blue
Holland	Dutch	Public	A	930	Ottawa	1985	Green
Holland Christian	Maroons	Private	B	674	Ottawa	2003	Blue
Holland West Ottawa	Panthers	Public	A	2170	Ottawa	1965	Red
Hopkins	Vikings	Public	B	483	Allegan	1994	Silver
Hudsonville	Eagles	Public	A	1972	Ottawa	1958#	Red
Hudsonville Unity Christian	Crusaders	Private	B	662	Ottawa	1995	Blue
Jenison	Wildcats	Public	A	1561	Ottawa	1970	Red
Kelloggsville	Rockets	Public	B	621	Kent	1958#	Silver
Middleville Thornapple Kellogg	Trojans	Public	A	936	Kent	1970	Gold
Muskegon	Big Reds	Public	A	1130	Muskegon	2003	Green
Norton Shores Mona Shores	Sailors	Public	A	1231	Muskegon	1985	Green
Muskegon Reeths-Puffer	Rockets	Public	A	1150	Muskegon	2003	Green
Northview	Wildcats	Public	A	1053	Kent	1965	White
Rockford	Rams	Public	A	2562	Kent	1970	Red
South Christian	Sailors	Private	B	659	Kent	1967	Gold
Spring Lake	Lakers	Public	B	784	Ottawa	2016	Blue
Wayland	Wildcats	Public	B	801	Allegan	1970	Gold
Wyoming	Wolves	Public	A	1224	Kent	2012	Green
Zeeland East	Chix	Public	A	988	Ottawa	1965	Green
Zeeland West	Dux	Public	A	1016	Ottawa	2005	Green

- Note: The class and population size are from the 2023-24 MHSAA listings. The # next to the year admitted is for founding members.

== Classifications ==
As of the 2006-07 school year the conference has put a requirement in writing for which sports they want all schools to have a varsity level program in. Those include Baseball, Basketball (boys & girls), Football, Softball (girls), Track & Field (boys & girls), Volleyball (girls), and Wrestling

They also listed a second group of sports which they want a minimal of two more sports in varsity level. Those include Bowling (boys & girls), Competitive Cheer (girls), Cross Country (boys & girls), Golf (boys & girls), Gymnastics (girls), Ice Hockey, Soccer (boys & girls), Swimming (boys & girls), Tennis (boys & girls), and Water Polo (boys & girls)

Furthermore, for expansion purposes they must have a JV program in the mandatory programs along with adding freshman programs. This has been a change when in 2004 they wanted freshman programs in all of the required programs instead they want to see improvement in the schools to have them form one when participation is high enough to warrant it.

Sports not listed as ones they will offer varsity status for include Lacrosse (boys & girls) and Skiing (boys & girls).

== 2024-25 Alignment ==
OK-Gold

- South Christian
- Thornapple Kellogg
- Holland
- Wayland
- Forest Hills Eastern
- Hamilton
- Holland Christian
- Unity Christian

OK-Red

- East Kentwood
- Rockford
- Holland West Ottawa
- Grand Haven
- Hudsonville
- Grandville
- Caledonia
- Jenison

OK-Black

- Kenowa Hills
- Grand Rapids Northview
- Muskegon Mona Shores
- Muskegon Reeths-Puffer
- Lowell
- Muskegon
- Greenville
- Cedar Springs

OK-White

- Grand Rapids Forest Hills Central
- Grand Rapids Forest Hills Northern
- Zeeland East
- Byron Center
- Zeeland West
- Wyoming
- East Grand Rapids
- Grand Rapids Christian

OK-Blue

- Grand Rapids Union
- Grand Rapids Ottawa Hills
- Coopersville
- Fruitport
- Spring Lake
- Allendale
- Grand Rapids Catholic Central
- West Catholic

OK-Silver

- Sparta
- Hopkins
- Godwin Heights
- Kelloggsville
- Calvin Christian
- Belding
- Comstock Park
- NorthPointe Christian

== Past realignments ==
Every two years, the conference realigns itself due to changes in school sizes as some school districts increase at a large rate while others may stay constant or decline. Along with the changes in school populations, they also hear requests to join the conference. The process is a lengthy one and requires a 75% majority of the member schools to allow any new school in the conference.

The Grand Rapids City League joined the conference for the 2008–2009 season. According to the Grand Rapids Press, the principals approved with a 43 to 1 vote. The league aligned with seven seven divisions and passed by the committee of athletic directors 34 to 10.

The executive board is made up of at least one principal from each division. After that the Executive Council made up all of the principals would ratify changes. The thought process is only do minor alignment change in two years followed by a possible major realignment in fours depending on different factors. The difference would be actual schools added to the conference or change in the number of divisions versus just flip flopping schools around.

According to the GR Press, seven schools voted no on the City League proposal for several different reasons. Two schools, Lowell and Zeeland West did not show up for the meeting and as such no votes were given to them. The other schools include Lee, East Kentwood, Hudsonville, Jenison, and Middleville. The reasons given for their no votes were because of concerns about the possibility that the four Grand Rapids Public Schools might drop their athletic programs, because of the enrollment differential in some divisions and because of the size of some of the divisions. According to past policies of those schools and previous article quotes from those schools it is assumed what schools felt which way. For Jenison, Hudsonville, and Lee it was the enrollment differences along with the size of their division. East Kentwood and probably Middleville were upset with the Athletic Director of the Grand Rapids Public Schools discussing saving money by eliminating two high school ADs after the first two votes of the conference to let them into the conference.

All seven City League schools officially became full members of the OK Conference beginning with the 2008–09 school year.

The Swimming Conferences were realigned for the 2011–2012 school year and consist of only four levels.

In 2019, a new alignment was enacted that took effect with the 2020–2021 school year. The OK Black division was abolished. The proposal was passed by a vote of 35 to 14 (33 votes or higher to pass).

== Notable alumni ==
Notable Alumni who have participated athletically in the OK Conference

- Robert Jackson, former NFL Player
- Ray Bentley, former NFL Player
- Kirk Cousins, current NFL Player
- Mike Dumas, former NFL Player
- Paul Grasmanis, former NFL Player
- Kevin Haverdink, former NFL Player
- Gary Hogeboom, former NFL Player
- Mike Knuble, NHL Player
- Mitch Lyons, former NFL Player
- Jay Riemersma, former NFL Player
- Steve Scheffler, former NBA Player
- Joel Smeenge, former NFL Player
- Joe Staley, former NFL player
- Matt Steigenga, former NBA Player
- John Vander Wal, former MLB Player
- Brent Gates, former MLB Player
- Loy Vaught, former NBA Player
- Dathan Ritzenhein, Two Time Olympian in Track and Field
- Brian Diemer, Bronze Medalist - 1984 Olympics in Track and Field, three time Olympian
- Luke Jensen, Former professional tennis player who reached a #6 world ranking in doubles.
- Ron Essink, Former NFL Player Drafted 1980 - Grand Valley wrestling All American.
- Ryan McDonald, Former NFL Player - All American and Rose Bowl starter with University of Illinois
- Justin Abdelkader, former NHL player.

== State championships ==
Schools that have won MHSAA (unless otherwise noted) state championships while being members of OK Conference.

Baseball
Year	School	Division/Class
2016	Holland Christian	2
2013	Grand Rapids Christian	2
2012	Hudsonville	1
2012	Grand Rapids Christian	2
2011	Rockford	1
2009	East Grand Rapids	2
2003	Holland West Ottawa	1
1996	Calvin Christian	B
1994	Calvin Christian	C
1976	Wyoming Park	B

Boys Basketball
Year	School	Division/Class
2021	Grand Rapids Catholic Central	2
2019	Hudsonville Unity Christian	2
2015	Godwin Heights	B
2014	Muskegon	A
2005	South Christian	B
2003	Rockford	A
2003	South Christian	B
1994	Calvin Christian	C
1988	South Christian	B
1984	Hamilton	C

Boys Bowling
Year	School	Class/Division
2024	Grandville	1
2017	Lowell	2
2004	Hudsonville	A
2004	Hudsonville Unity Christian	B

Boys Cross Country
Year	School	Class/Division
2015	Rockford	1
2014	Rockford	1
2014	Grand Rapids Christian	2
2011	Calvin Christian	3
2010	Forest Hills Northern	2
2010	Calvin Christian	3
2002	Rockford	1
2000	Rockford	1
1999	Allendale	C
1996	Caledonia	B
1978	Godfrey-Lee	C
1972	Godfrey-Lee	C-D
1971	Godfrey-Lee	C-D
1967	Northview	B
1961	Wyoming	B

Football
Year	School	Division/Class
2012	Grand Rapids Christian	3
2012	Grand Rapids South Christian	4
2010	Grand Rapids West Catholic	5
2010	Grand Rapids Catholic Central	4
2010	East Grand Rapids	3
2009	Lowell	2
2009	East Grand Rapids	3
2008	Rockford	1
2008	Muskegon	2
2008	East Grand Rapids	3
2008	Holland Christian	4
2007	East Grand Rapids	3
2006	Muskegon	2
2006	East Grand Rapids	3
2006	Zeeland West	4
2005	Rockford	1
2005	Caledonia	3
2004	Rockford	1
2004	Muskegon	2
2004	Lowell	3
2003	East Grand Rapids	3
2002	Lowell	2
2002	East Grand Rapids	3
2002	South Christian	4
1997	Belding	B
1996	Grandville	A
1995	East Grand Rapids	BB
1994	Belding	B
1993	East Grand Rapids	BB
1992	Muskegon Reeths-Puffer	A
1984	Wyoming Park	B
1983	East Grand Rapids	B
1978	Forest Hills Northern	C
1976	East Grand Rapids	B

Boys Golf
Year	School	Division/Class
2005	Muskegon Mona Shores	1
2005	East Grand Rapids	2
2001	East Kentwood	1
2000	Muskegon Mona Shores	1
1991	Muskegon Mona Shores	A
1989	Muskegon Mona Shores	A
1989	Calvin Christian	C
1988	Grandville	A
1988	Comstock Park	C
1987	Comstock Park	C
1983	Forest Hills Northern	C
1976	Grandville	A

Ice Hockey
Year	School	Division/Class
2011	Grand Rapids Catholic Central	3
2000	Muskegon Mona Shores	2
1990	East Kentwood	A

Boys Lacrosse
Year	School	Class/Division
1999	East Grand Rapids	B
2007	East Grand Rapids	2
2020	East Grand Rapids	2

Boys Soccer
Year	School	Division/Class
2011	Northview	A
2010	East Kentwood	1
2008	East Kentwood	1
2007	East Kentwood	1
2007	Hudsonville Unity Christian	2
2004	Forest Hills Central	2
2003	Holland Christian	2
1986	Holland Christian	B/C

Boys Skiing
Year	School	Class
1999	East Grand Rapids	B-C-D
1997	East Grand Rapids	B-C-D
1996	Forest Hills Central	A

Boys Swimming & Diving
Year	School	Division
2018	Holland Christian	3
2008	East Grand Rapids	3
2007	Holland	2
2004	Holland	1
2001	Rockford	1
1991	Zeeland	2
1990	Zeeland	2
1989	Holland Christian	2
1988	Holland Christian	2
1989	East Kentwood	1
1983	East Kentwood	1
1982	East Grand Rapids	2
1981	East Grand Rapids	2
1980	East Grand Rapids	2
1979	East Grand Rapids	2
1978	East Grand Rapids	2
1977	East Grand Rapids	2
1976	East Grand Rapids	2
1971	Holland West Ottawa	2
1970	Holland West Ottawa	2
1969	Holland West Ottawa	2

Boys Tennis
Year	School	Division/Class
2007	East Grand Rapids	3
2003	Forest Hills Central	2
2003	East Grand Rapids	3
2001	East Grand Rapids	3
1998	Forest Hills Central	2
1998	Forest Hills Northern	3
1995	Forest Hills Northern	B
1979	East Grand Rapids	B
1978	East Grand Rapids	B
1977	East Grand Rapids	B
1975	East Grand Rapids	B
1973	East Grand Rapids	A
1972	East Grand Rapids	A (co-champ)
1971	East Grand Rapids	A (co-champ)
1970	East Grand Rapids	A
1965	Holland Christian	B
1963	Holland Christian	B
1954	Holland Christian	B
1953	Holland Christian	B

Boys Track & Field
Year	School	Division/Class
2021	Rockford	1
2019	East Kentwood	1
2018	East Kentwood	1
2017	East Kentwood	1
2014	East Kentwood	1
2013	East Kentwood	1
2011	East Kentwood	1
2010	East Kentwood	1
2010	Byron Center	2
2009	East Kentwood	1
2009	Hamilton	2
2006	Forest Hills Northern	2
1989	Northview	B

Boys Water Polo
Year	School	Class
2007	Rockford	Open
2006	Rockford	Open
2005	Rockford	Open
2004	Rockford	Open
2003	Rockford	Open
2000	Rockford	Open
1995	Jenison	Open

Wrestling
Year	School	Division/Class
2009	Rockford	1
2009	Lowell	2
2008	Greenville	2
2007	Rockford	1
2004	Lowell	2
2002	Lowell	2
1996	Middleville	3
1995	Cedar Springs	B
1993	Grandville	A
1974	Comstock Park	C

Girls Basketball
Year	School	Class
2013	Grand Haven	A
2012	Grand Haven	A
2010	Grand Rapids Catholic Central	B
2006	Hudsonville Unity Christian	B
1997	Grand Rapids Christian	A
1989	Grand Rapids Ottawa Hills	A
1988	South Christian	B
1973	Hudsonville Unity Christian	B

Girls Bowling
Year	School	Class/Division
2007	Kelloggsville	3
2006	Kelloggsville	C-D

Girls Competitive Cheer
Year	School	Class/Division
2008	Grandville	1
2007	Holland Christian	2
2004	Grandville	A
1998	Grandville	A
1997	Grandville	A

Girls Cross Country
Year	School	Class/Division
2014	Grand Rapids Christian	2
2013	Grand Rapids Christian	2
2012	Ada Forest Hills Eastern	2
2011	East Grand Rapids	2
2010	Grand Rapids Christian	2
2010	Grand Haven	1
2009	East Grand Rapids	2
2008	East Grand Rapids	2
2007	NorthPointe Christian	4
2006	Grand Rapids Christian	2
2006	NorthPointe Christian	4
2005	Grand Rapids Christian	2
2004	East Grand Rapids	2
2003	East Grand Rapids	2
2002	Rockford	1
2001	Rockford	1
2001	Middleville	2
2000	Rockford	1
2000	Middleville	2
2000	Kelloggsville	3
1999	Rockford	A
1999	Middleville	B
1998	Rockford	A
1996	Caledonia	B
1995	Caledonia	B
1994	Caledonia	B
1993	Caledonia	B
1981	Godfrey-Lee	D

Girls Golf
Year	School	Division/Class
2007	South Christian	3
2002	Caledonia	2
1999	East Grand Rapids	3
1998	Grandville	A
1997	Grandville	A
1982	Forest Hills Northern	Open
1979	East Grand Rapids	Open

Gymnastics
Year	School	Class
2000	East Kentwood	Open
1997	Holland	Open
1996	Holland	Open
1995	Holland	Open
1994	Holland	Open
1992	Muskegon Mona Shores	Open
1991	Muskegon Mona Shores	Open
1989	Rockford	Open
1986	Holland	Open
1982	East Kentwood	Open
1980	East Kentwood	Open

Girls Lacrosse
Year	School	Class/Division
2011	Grand Rapids Catholic Central	2

Girls Soccer
Year	School	Class
2013	Calvin Christian	4
2012	Calvin Christian	4
2007	Hudsonville Unity Christian	3
2006	Hudsonville Unity Christian	3
2005	Forest Hills Central	2
2005	Hudsonville Unity Christian	3
2002	East Grand Rapids	2
2001	East Grand Rapids	3
2000	East Grand Rapids	3

Softball
Year	School	Division/Class
2006	Wayland	2
2005	Wyoming Rogers	2
2001	Wyoming Rogers	2
1999	Wyoming Rogers	2
1996	Wyoming Park	B
1995	Jenison	A
1994	Jenison	A
1993	Calvin Christian	C
1992	Jenison	A
1991	Northview	B
1990	Jenison	A
1988	Jenison	A
1988	Calvin Christian	C
1987	Jenison	A
1976	Holland Christian	B

Girls Swimming & Diving
Year	School	Division
2001	East Grand Rapids	2
2000	East Grand Rapids	2
1999	East Grand Rapids	2
1998	East Grand Rapids	2
1996	Holland Christian	B/C/D
1994	Forest Hills Central	1
1994	Zeeland	2
1993	Forest Hills Central	1
1993	East Grand Rapids	2
1992	East Grand Rapids	2
1991	Zeeland	2
1990	Zeeland	2
1989	Zeeland	2
1988	East Grand Rapids	2
1987	Zeeland	2
1986	East Grand Rapids	2
1985	East Grand Rapids	2
1984	East Grand Rapids	2
1983	East Grand Rapids	2
1982	East Grand Rapids	2
1981	East Grand Rapids	2
1979	East Grand Rapids	2
1978	East Grand Rapids	2

Girls Tennis
Year	School	Division/Class
2008	Forest Hills Northern	2
2007	Forest Hills Northern	2
2006	Forest Hills Northern	2
2006	Holland Christian	3
2005	Holland Christian	3
2004	Forest Hills Northern	2
2003	Forest Hills Northern	2
2003	East Grand Rapids	3
2002	East Grand Rapids	3
2001	East Grand Rapids	3
2000	East Grand Rapids	3
1998	East Grand Rapids	3
1997	East Grand Rapids	3
1996	East Grand Rapids	B
1995	East Grand Rapids	B
1994	East Grand Rapids	B
1992	East Grand Rapids	B
1987	East Grand Rapids	B
1986	East Grand Rapids	B
1985	East Grand Rapids	B
1984	East Grand Rapids	B
1979	East Grand Rapids	B

Girls Track & Field
Year	School	Division/Class
2008	Forest Hills Northern	2
2006	Kent City	3
2003	Rockford	1
2000	Rockford	1
1995	Caledonia	B

Volleyball
Year	School	Class
2008	Jenison	A
2008	Holland Christian	B
2007	Jenison	A
2007	South Christian	B
2006	East Kentwood	A
2002	Forest Hills Northern	A
2000	East Kentwood	A
1990	East Kentwood	A
1978	Forest Hills Northern	C

Girls Water Polo
Year	School	Class
2007	Hudsonville	Open
2006	Rockford	Open
2005	East Grand Rapids	Open
2004	Rockford	Open

- Note: The Comstock Park Championship was determined by Individual Format versus the Team Duel Format.
- Note: Water polo is not recognized by the MHSAA but the OK Conference allows it full varsity status. The teams compete for the Michigan Water Polo Association (MWPA) State Championship.

== Membership Timeline ==
Ottawa Kent OK-Blue OK-Red OK-Red Metro/Lakeshore OK-White OK-Gold OK-Silver OK-Black OK-Green OK-Bronze
