= Thornapple River =

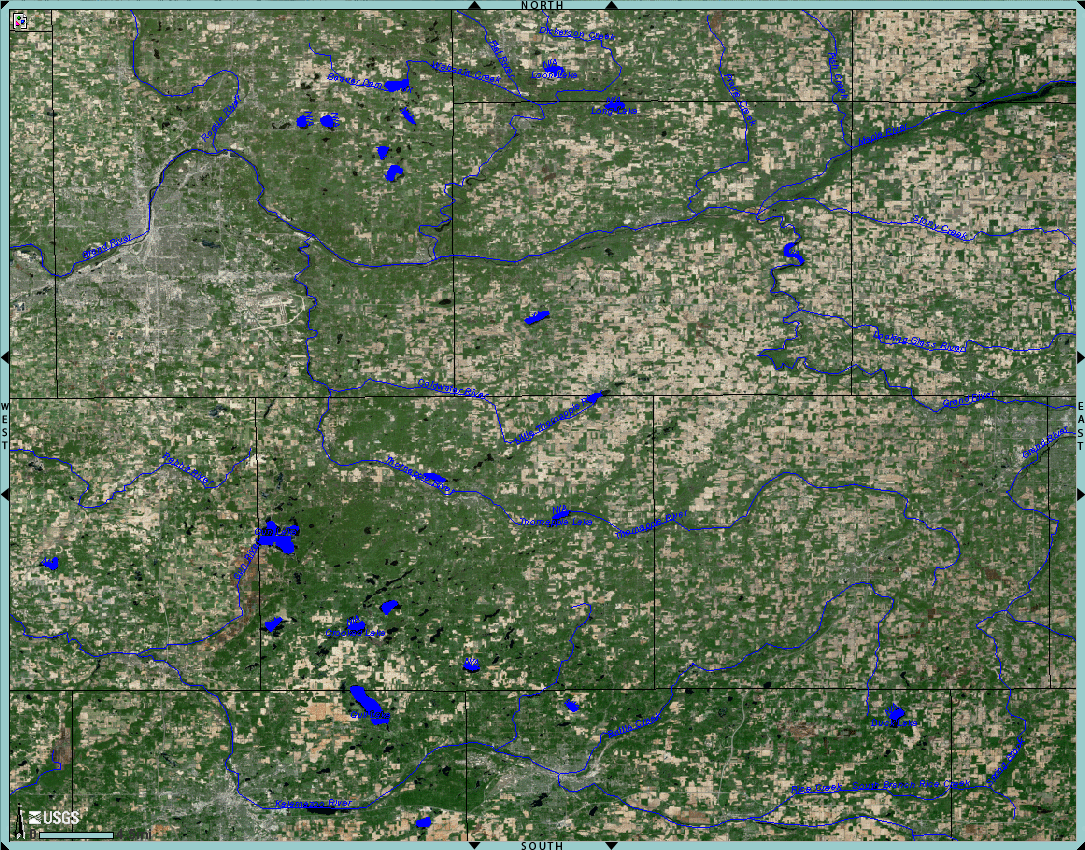
- Enhanced USGS Satellite Image, Thornapple River drainage basin.
- Native name: Sowanquesake (Ottawa); Tomba-Signe

Location
- Country: United States
- State: Michigan
- Counties: Drainage basin covers portions of Barry, Eaton, Ionia, and Kent Counties in Central Michigan

Physical characteristics
- Source
  - location: S of Boody Lake, Eaton Township, Eaton County, Michigan
- Mouth
  - location: Grand River, Ada Township, Kent County, Michigan
  - elevation: 617 ft (188 m)
- Length: 88 mi (142 km)
- Discharge
  - location: mouth
  - average: 838.49 cu ft/s (23.743 m^{3}/s) (estimate)

The Thornapple River (Ottawa: Sowanquesake, "Forked River") (GNIS ID #1075813) is an 88.1-mile-long (141.8 km) tributary of Michigan's longest river, the Grand River. The Thornapple rises in Eaton County, Michigan and drains a primarily rural farming area in Central Michigan. It joins the Grand in Ada, Michigan, 10 miles (16 km) east of Grand Rapids.

== Description ==
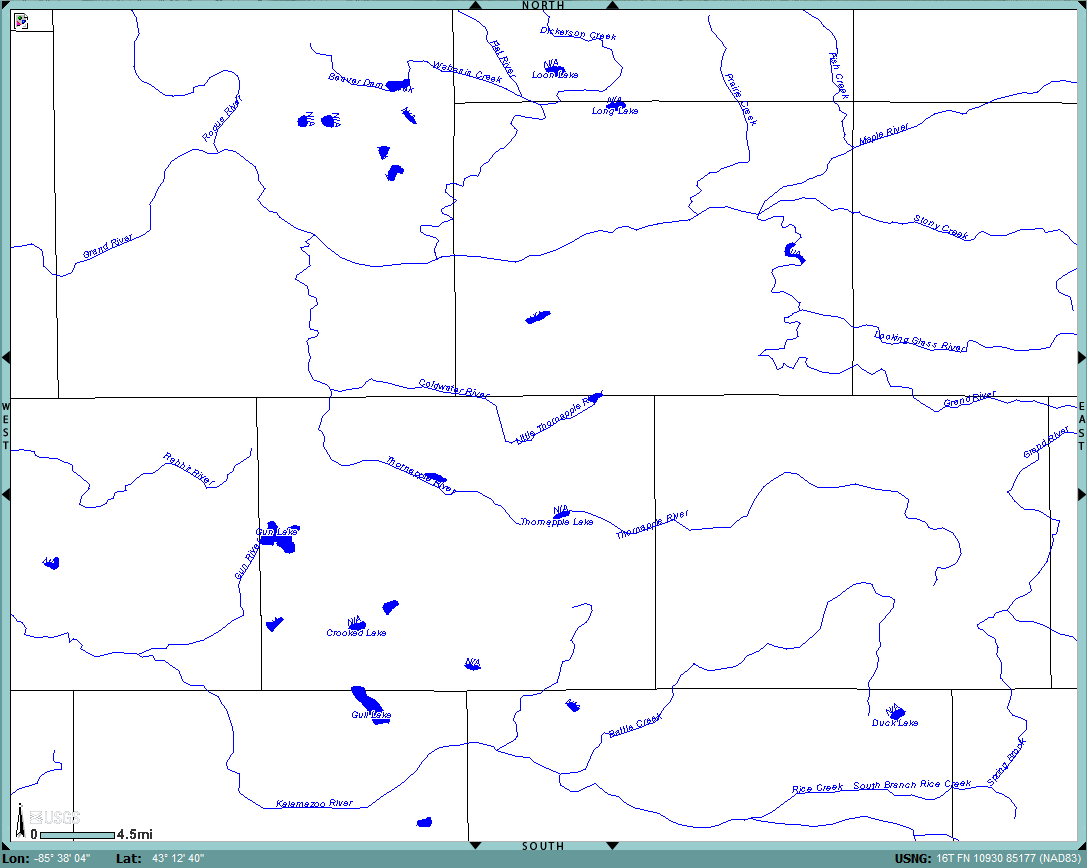
Watershed and context of Thornapple River

The Thornapple, a major Grand River tributary, is about 88 miles (142 km) long. Its headwaters are located about 7 miles (11 km) east of Charlotte, Michigan in Eaton County's Eaton township (only 7 miles (11 km) west of the Grand River at Eaton Rapids). It flows generally west and north through Eaton and Barry counties, before entering the Grand in Kent County. The Grand ultimately flows into Lake Michigan at Grand Haven, approximately 70 miles (110 km) down stream. The Thornapple is described as "An easygoing stream that meanders through low southwest Michigan woodlands." The Thornapple itself has a major tributary in the Coldwater River. The Thornapple is the only major left tributary of the Grand River.

== History ==
The major rivers and streams within the Grand River watershed were formed during the Pleistocene epoch and the subsequent advance/retreat glaciation cycle, terminating about 6–8000 years ago. Prior to European settlement, the Thornapple drainage basin had mixed hardwood/conifer forest and barrens.

At the turn of the 19th century, the Thornapple was home to bands of both Ottawa and Potawatomi. Into the 1830s, the Grand River Band of Ottawa had a village at the mouth of the Thornapple led by Nebawnaygezhick ("Part of the Day").

During the early colonial settlement of Michigan, Rix Robinson, the first permanent colonial settler of Kent County, married Sebequay ("River Woman"), the sister of Nebawnaygezhick, at the Thornapple. Robinson also established a fur trading post in conjunction with John Jacob Astor's American Fur Company at the mouth of the Thornapple in 1821 to trade with the Ottawa and Potawatomi and conduct other business. By 1836, with the fur trade in decline, Robinson facilitated a treaty between local tribes and the Federal government that opened much of the area, including the Thornapple basin, to white settlement. Robinson later purchased hundreds of acres around the mouth of the Thornapple for the Ottawa to continue living on.

As with many rivers in 19th and early 20th century America, the Thornapple had significant logging, milling, and manufacturing activity along it. As an example:

by 1862 Ada had a number of businesses which included: general stores, a flour mill, a saw mill, hotels, a blacksmith, a carriage maker, a boot and shoe store, two churches, a doctor, three Justices of the Peace, and an attorney. Later, a basket factory was built next to the flour and saw mills on the Thornapple River.

The river was subject to periodic flooding. The 1904-1905 flood was "the worst flooding in Ada history." A number of dams were constructed in the early 20th century for flood control and power generation.

In 1957, as part of a M-21 Grand River bridge replacement project, the mouth of the Thornapple and lower channel were relocated about 500 feet upstream on the Grand, and land that had been the site of Robinson's first home in Ada and trading post was inundated.

== Modern use ==
Today the Thornapple is not a navigable waterway, and there is no commercial water transport on it. The major use of the river is recreational. The Thornapple River sees significant use for rafting, kayaking, tubing, and canoeing on a small but significant portion of its 88-mile (142 km) extent. The Thornapple supports several canoe livery businesses. The Paul Henry–Thornapple Rail Trail parallels the river for a significant portion of its length.

From the headwaters in Eaton County to Thornapple Lake, the river is creeklike, with narrow banks and tangled undergrowth restricting easy passage. The lower stretch of the river is a series of dam-created reservoirs that are heavily developed. However, from the lake to the first dam impoundment below Irving, is a 14-mile (23 km) stretch of river that is suitable for family outings and float trips.

The river is also very fishable. A large number of species inhabit the river, among them: sunfishes (largemouth bass, smallmouth bass, rock bass bluegill, crappie, pumpkinseed, and warmouth), bowfin, brown bullhead, minnows (common carp, chub, dace, and shiner), suckers (white sucker and redhorse), perches (yellow perch, walleye, darter), brook stickleback, northern pike, longnose gar, trout (brown trout, brook trout, and rainbow trout), and lampreys (American brook lamprey and chestnut lamprey).

The river is claimed to be "nationally known as a fine smallmouth bass stream", and there are typically large numbers of small mouth bass in the free-flowing sections between Nashville and the junction with the Coldwater river. Fishing access is good, as most of the free-flowing Thornapple can be waded or floated during normal summer flows, and many county road crossings afford good access.

In addition to the many fish species that live in the Thornapple, the river is also home to other wildlife including osprey, bald eagles, herons, and various species of ducks, some who winter in Michigan. People use the recreational facilities on the river to observe these species for pleasure and knowledge seeking.

On the lower reaches of the river, especially in the several impoundments behind the dams, there is significant recreational watercraft usage, both powered and sail, as well as personal water craft, although no provisions for specific clearances under bridges have been made, and the dams do not have locks, so portaging or trailered transport is required to move craft from one reach to another.

== Watershed ==
=== Land Cover ===
Totaling over 857 square miles and covering portions of Barry, Eaton, Ionia, and Kent Counties in Central Michigan, the Thornapple River Watershed has approximately 324 miles of streams and rivers that flow into the Lower Grand River Watershed.

The land within the watershed is:

- 52.1% farmland
- 38.7% forest
- 1.5% wetland
- 1.6% water
- 6.1% developed
- 0.03% barren

=== Tributaries ===
The Thornapple's tributaries are:Butternut Creek, Milbourn Allen and Crane Drain-Thornapple River, Thornapple Drain, Fish Creek-Little Thornapple River, Hayes Drain-Thornapple River, Darken and Boyer Drain-Thornapple River, Lacey Creek, Thompson Creek-Thornapple River, Shanty Creek, Quaker Brook, Scipio Creek-Thornapple River, Headwaters Mud Creek, Mud Creek, High Bank Creek, Cedar Creek, Thornapple Lake-Thornapple River, Jordan Lake-Little Thornapple River, Woodland Creek-Little Thornapple River, Messer Brook-Coldwater River, Duck Creek Creek, Pratt Lake Creek, Bear Creek, Coldwater River, Fall Creek, Butler Creek-Thornapple River, Glass Creek, Algonquin Lake-Thornapple River, Duncan Creek, Turner Creek-Thornapple River, and McCords Creek-Thornapple River.

=== Cities and incorporated villages ===
The Thornapple flows through:

- Charlotte
- Nashville
- Hastings
- Middleville
- Alaska (North Brownsville)
- Cascade
- Ada

=== Crossings ===
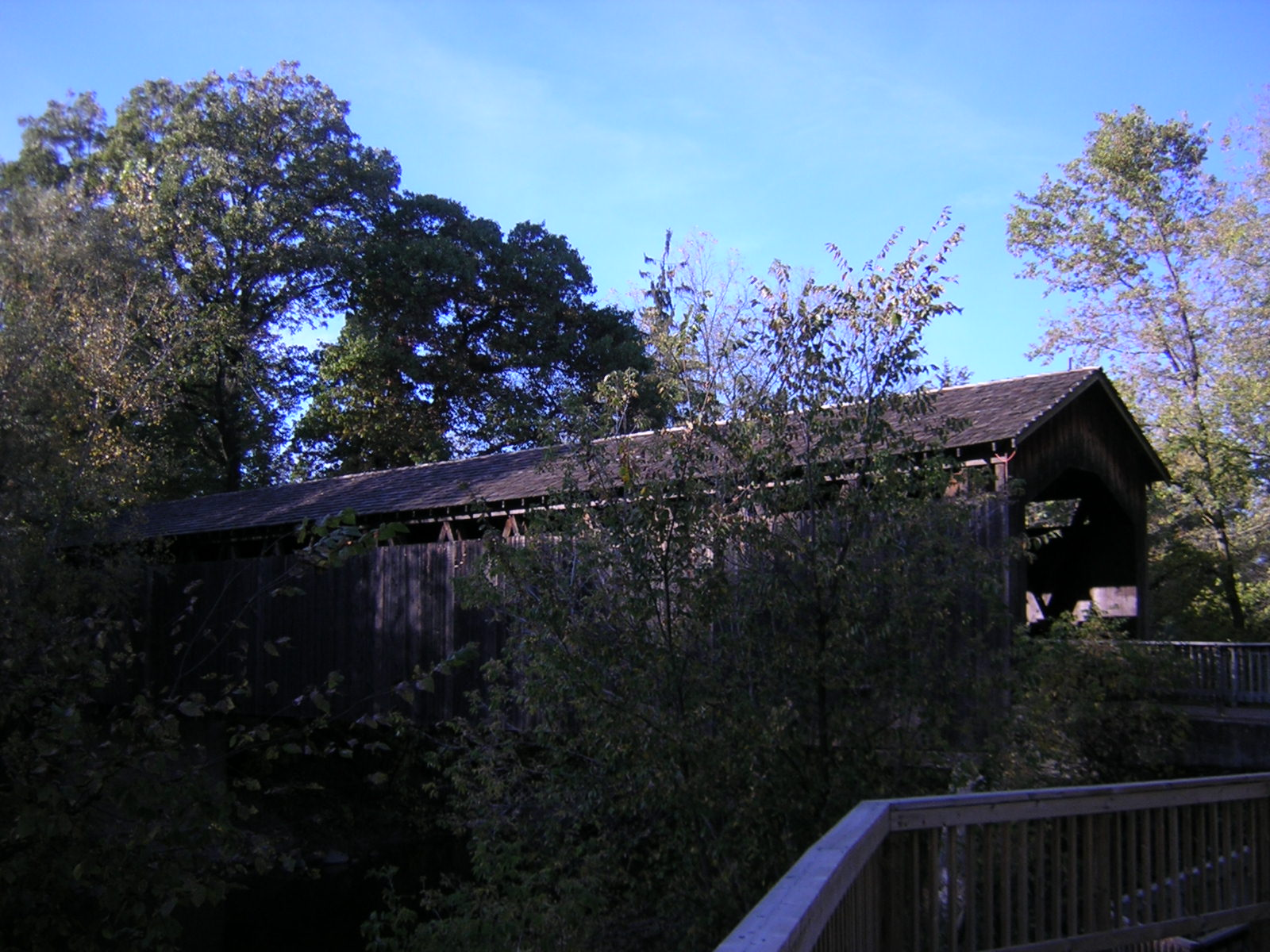
Ada Covered Bridge, upstream view

The river is crossed by several rural county roads and railroads along its course. Several state trunkline highways do as well:

- I-69, S of Potterville
- M-50, NW of Charlotte
- M-66, in Nashville
- M-43, in Hastings
- I-96 ( M-6 interchange), in Cascade Township

Also crossing the river is the Ada Covered Bridge, open to foot and bicycle transportation, in Ada.

=== Dams ===
The river has six major dams along its course. They are, from headwaters to mouth:

Location	Description/Notes	Coordinates	Mean Elevation of Impoundment	Image
Nashville	Closest to the headwaters. A very small elevation change dam that does not generate power, only serves to control flow. Some may consider it more of a weir, although it is signed as a dam. The dam was removed in September 2009 to improve fish habitat.	42.610085°N 85.100355°W	813 ft	Nashville Dam from park
Irving	Downstream from Thornapple Lake (natural lake). Actually 3 different dams, a power dam at the west end of a power canal, and two flow control (one obsolete and unused, the other more recent) dams to the east. This topographic map from USGS (via Microsoft Research Maps) should clarify. See also this image from TIGER data. Operated by Commonwealth Power Company.	42.690322°N 85.419731°W	741 ft	Irving Dam headhouse from parking lot
Middleville	Operated by Commonwealth Power Company. and located in the village of Middleville.	42.71122°N 85.465624°W	724 ft	see CPC images
Labarge (Caledonia)	Near 84th street crossing. Operated by Commonwealth Power.	42.81075°N 85.484394°W	692 ft	Labarge Dam from downstream
Cascade	Near the Grand Rapids airport. Generates 1.4 Mw of electric power. Owned by Cascade Township and operated under contract by STS Hydropower Ltd.	42.908349°N 85.49891°W	665 ft	Cascade Dam from downstream
Ada	Just upstream from the Ada Covered Bridge, less than 1 mi from the mouth. Generates 1.6 Mw of electric power. Owned by the Thornapple Association and operated under contract by STS Hydropower Ltd, (DBA Ada Cogeneration Limited Partnership)	42.950651°N 85.485885°W	632 ft	Ada Dam
