= Forest Hills Eastern High School =

Location
- 2200 Pettis; Ada, Kent, Michigan 49301; United States; 43.00517°N 85.5264°W

Information
- School type: Public
- Established: August 2004
- School district: Forest Hills Public Schools
- Principal: Daniel McElheny
- Teaching staff: 42.95 (FTE)
- Grades: 9th-12th
- Enrollment: 767 (2023-2024)
- Student to teacher ratio: 17.86
- Colors: Crimson and Black
- Athletics conference: OK-Gold
- Nickname: Hawks
- Newspaper: The Hawk Herald
- Yearbook: Talon
- Website: fhps.net/high-schools/eastern/

Forest Hills Eastern High School, commonly referred to as Forest Hills Eastern (FHE), is a Public Day School attended by students between the grades of 9 and 12 (ages approximately 12 to 18). The school is located in Ada, Michigan which is considered to be a high-income area. Forest Hills Eastern is districted to Forest Hills Public Schools and falls under the jurisdiction of the Kent Intermediate School District. It follows a traditional curriculum teacher on student lecture complemented by technology usage. The school is managed by a principal and overseen by The Forest Hills School Board. It shares a building with Forest Hills Eastern Middle School which services grades 6th through 8th. Forest Hills Eastern High School was founded in 2004 and is the newest (and smallest) of three high schools in the school district. The district also encompasses Forest Hills Northern High School (FHN) and Forest Hills Central High School (FHC).

== History ==
Following several years of studies and surveys by the Forest Hills School District, the Forest Hills Board of Education approved the choice of constructing a third high school on the Ada September 2000 Bond-Issue Ballet. This was proposed in order to meet the growing enrollment needs of the school district. This measure passed Forest Hills Eastern was approved for construction. Initially, the school had very basic facilities for the high school and did not have plans for additional athletic/musical add-ons. However, an auditorium, athletic field, and a second gym were added to a later ballet question offered in the February 2004 KISD special education election. Construction was completed and the school officially opened its doors to students on August 29, 2004. The additional add-ons to the school (second gym, auditorium) did not finish construction until August 2005.

=== Additional bonds ===
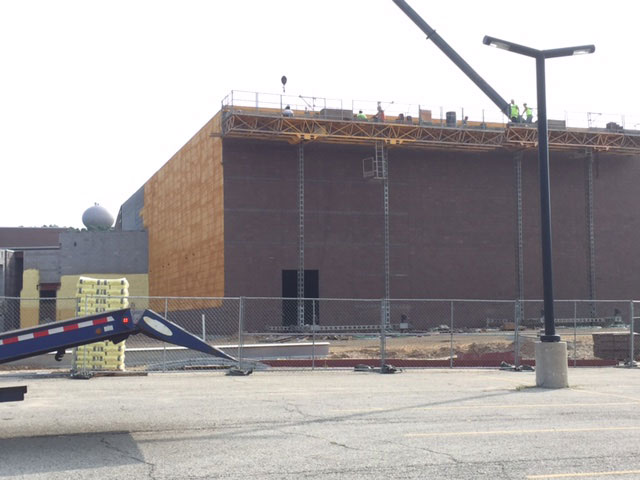
Image of the unfinished Auxiliary gym of Forest Hills Eastern High School

Over time, additional improvements have been made to FHE. Namely, in 2009 multiple science laboratories in the school were expanded to include enough space for a classroom in order to create a more efficient learning environment. Following this in November 2013, voters in the Forest Hills District approved a $45 million bond to address the technology, security, and building needs of the district. In March 2014, the Forest Hills School Board approved $25 million of the funds to go out to the schools. At FHE, this was used to build an auxiliary gymnasium (3rd gym) and an additional parking lot to accommodate the new construction. The add-on parking lot holds up to an additional 100 cars at max capacity. The new auxiliary gym includes a mezzanine (doubles as a track), restrooms, locker rooms, and an additional boiler. Doug Johnson, the school board president at the time, stated that "The auxiliary gym is a tremendous benefit for the students, parents, and families, but it wouldn't be possible without the strength of our community coming together to support our schools."

In addition to the gymnasium, many other minor features were included in the renovation. Features such as heated sidewalk in front of the main entrance, electronic security measures for external doors (electronic locks), a new secure entrance for athletes, and various bandwidth/Wi-Fi improvements for technology across the district. The majority of these projects were finished just after the school year began in the fall of 2015.

==== 2018 ballot bond proposal ====
In April 2016, Superintendent at the time Dan Behm invited parents across the Forest Hills School district to participate "Contingent Growth Task Force." This task force was a think tank for solutions that could address the districts concerns with student enrollment exceeding the districts capacity. The task force concluded that EMS would need to take on 6th grade students from both elementary schools the fed into it. This entailed the proposed construction of additional classrooms into the EHS/EMS campus.

In 2018 the Forest Hills School board voted on and approved the a 15-year $130-million bond to go to vote. Following this, voters approved the November 6 bond Ballot proposal for the school district. According to FHPS, the funds are being spread out over the entire district and are going towards various school upgrades: improving infrastructure and replacing old systems; improving classrooms, curriculum, and teacher resources; improving or replacing security systems.

=== COVID-19 ===
Like many schools in the United States, FHE has been severely affected by COVID-19. In the spring of 2020, FHE was shut down as part of Michigan Gov. Gretchen Whitmer's executive order to close schools. This forced the school district to resort to online learning for the duration of the 2019-2020 school year. The following school year (2020-2021), the school swapped between full virtual, a hybrid schedule, and full in-person learning as cases in the local area rose and fell.

Amidst the change during this time, Mr. Tim Hollern, one of the assistant principals at the time, died due to complications with Covid-19 and his Metastatic Cancer. This was a terrible loss to the school as many students regarded him highly. Superintendent Dan Behm shared his sympathies with the faculty, students, and families, saying that "Mr. Hollern was a beloved teacher, coach, and school administrator, and was always focused on everyone else and what he could do to help a student, a colleague, or a stranger. He loved coming to work and serving his school and community."

== Curriculum ==
For the most part, Forest Hills Eastern follows a traditional curriculum. Each student who attends the full 4-year High-School curriculum will go through 8 semesters with 6 classes a day. Students are required to take 4 years of English and 4 years of Mathematics. Students must also take 3 years of science classes in either Chemistry, Physics, Biology (requisite), Human Anatomy, or Forensic Science. Students must also take three years of Social Studies with the required courses of World History, Civics, Economics, and US History and are encouraged to take at least 1 class in government, psychology, and environmental science. Finally, each student is required to take at least one semester of arts, two years of a foreign language, one semester of Physical Education, and 9 semesters of electives (any class over the minimum requirement count towards this). Students do have the opportunity to have their Physical Education requirements waived granted they are a member of a sports team or have sufficient honors classes.

Forest Hills Eastern also holds multiple AP courses every year ranging from AP Language and Composition to AP Computer Science Principles, to AP Calculus AB/BC. Over 50% of the students choose to take at least one AP course and the school allows students to take part in the AP Seminar and AP Research course. Additionally, students are permitted to take classes outside of the in-school curriculum at nearby alternate schools such as the Kent Career Tech Center (KCTC) and Kent Innovation High School (KIHS). Forest Hills Public Schools is partnered with Kent ISD to include more career learning in its curriculum in exchange for $2000+ in grants. FHE has achieved a more career learning-based environment by creating the Take the Lead program and encouraging students to participate in "Groundhog Day" – job shadowing programs based out of Grand Rapids, Michigan. If students choose, they can also have an independent study with a teacher or declare an hour at the beginning or end of their day as "work-study" and will use that time to work at a job (not sponsored by the school) instead of taking a class.

=== Technology ===
Forest Hills Eastern used technology to supplement its curriculum and enhance student learning. It does this by following the guidelines set by the Michigan Integrated Technology Competencies for Students (MITECHS) program. The school provides students with computers to use during school hours and provides all of its faculty with laptops. The school uses funds received from bonds to further invest in technology. Some of these funds go towards professional learning for faculty so they can become more technologically literate and learn how to further integrate technology into their classroom.

During times when the schools are shut down due to COVID-19, the school shifts the learning environment online. It utilizes virtual meeting technology such as Zoom Video Communications and manages classwork through an education startup called Clever. It is using what it calls a "continued learning" plan to still provide a full education to students while in-person learning is limited. Additionally, Chromebooks are loaned to students who do not have good access to technology at home.

== Extracurricular activities ==
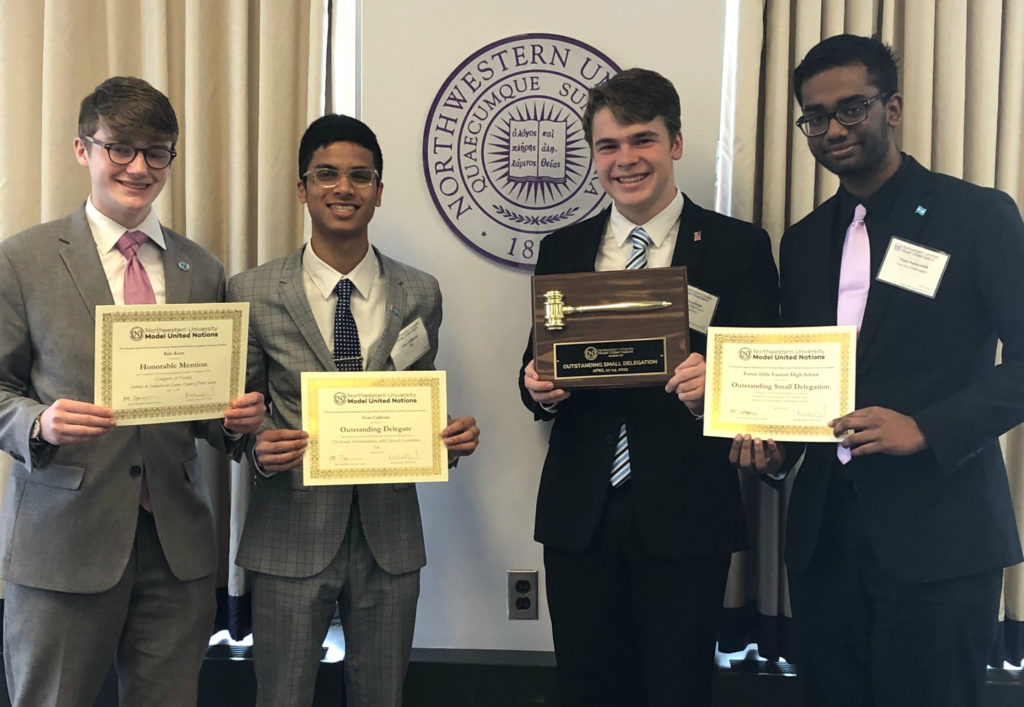
4 members of the Forest Hills Eastern High School MUN club winning awards at a Northwestern College Conference

School clubs include Chess, Math club, Planeteers, Volunteer board, Kids Food Basket, Rock Climbing, GSA, Ski/Snowboard, Mask Club, Protect Life FHE(Pro-Life Club), and GLI(Global Learners Initiative). The school has a National Honors Society organization that hosts a variety of volunteer projects. There is also a non-elected Student Council that is in charge of school assemblies and dances. The school hosts teams for Model United Nations, Mock trial, Science Olympiad, DECA, and Quiz bowl which all regularly compete in competitions on a yearly basis across the state.

=== Student newspaper ===
Forest Hills Eastern is the host to one newspaper called the Hawk Herald. It is sponsored by the school and has a faculty member that oversees it. Additionally, its editors in chief are all students. It releases articles weekly and focuses on a wide range of topics from politics, to DIY projects, to sports, to in-school events. The Newspaper no longer releases paper copies of its articles and has moved completely online.

=== Music ===
Musical Activities include Orchestra, Choir, and a Band that performs seasonal concerts for students and families. There is also a jazz band that meets before school and will occasionally play in the great hall in the mornings. Additionally, a theater club will put on plays and musicals every year in the school auditorium. Every year, the theater program works with the Fine Arts Center to put on large musicals in conjunction with the other two high schools in the district. This musical is often accompanied by a pit orchestra staffed by local volunteers, students, and hired professional musicians. The school also allows the local adult community band to use its facilities to practice and hold concerts.

=== Sports ===
The school currently is in the Ottawa-Kent Conference Gold Division

The school currently has teams for football, soccer, tennis, lacrosse, golf, cross country running, track and field, crew (rowing), baseball, and softball.

== Campus ==
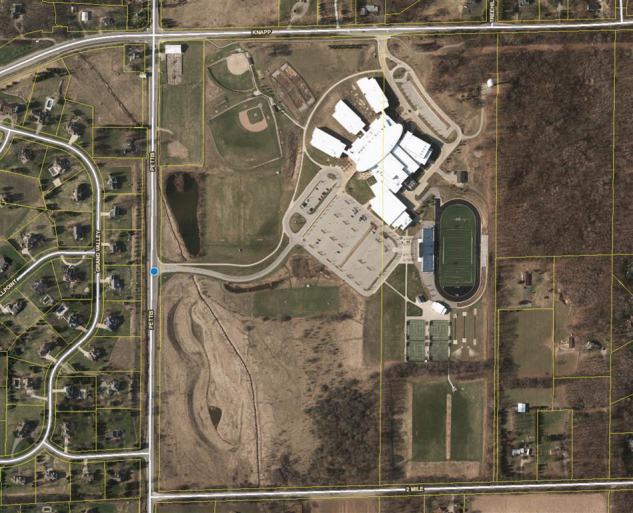
An Aerial Image of the Forest Hills Eastern High School and Middle School campus

The educational facilities of the campus are broken into four separate wings: A(1st and 2nd floor) and B(2nd floor) hall which hold classrooms and science labs for high school students; C(2nd and 3rd floor) Hall which is primarily used for middle school classrooms, the EMS office directly borders this hall; D hall which holds the schools high school and auxiliary gymnasium; E hall which holds all musical facilities and directly borders the middle school gymnasium.

The school has an open cafeteria which is in the center of the building, it has direct access to every locker bank and wing. The school building has two primary entrances: the high school entrance, which houses the main office and serves as an entrance for students who drive themselves to school, and the middle school entrance, which is next to the middle school office and is the entrance for those who use the school bus system.

Around the school are various athletic facilities including a large football stadium(with a track), multiple soccer fields, tennis courts, and other opens fields used for various sports. Additionally, there are three major parking lots: a middle school faculty lot, a high school faculty lot, and a general lot on the high school side used for student and sport event parking.

== Academic achievements ==
Forest Hills Eastern is well-ranked among schools in Michigan. It is ranked 44th in the State for Math and Reading Proficiency and boasts a 96% graduation rate (well above state median). Although the school does not have an extensive history of achievement in academic competitions, multiple students of the school have been named as National Merit Semi-Finalists. In the field of Social Studies, a small number of students have represented the school at the National History Day Competition. Many of those students moved on to represent the school at the National competition, one of which having their paper recognized by The Historical Society of Michigan.

== Student demographics ==
Generally, Forest Hills Eastern is predominantly white, however, it has become slightly more racially diverse since it was founded in 2004. The school is located in a high-income area with a median income of $117,173. Just under 15% of students at the school are considered "economically disadvantaged" and approximately 3.13% of people in the district are below the poverty line.

Student Demographics by Race(# of Students)
| School Year | American Indian Alaska Native | Asian | Black | Hispanic | Native Hawaiian Pacific Islander | White | Two or more races |
|---|---|---|---|---|---|---|---|
| 2020-2021 | 2 | 64 | 19 | 35 | 0 | 627 | 38 |
| 2019-2020 | 3 | 64 | 19 | 35 | 0 | 627 | 38 |
| 2018-2019 | 3 | 63 | 24 | 22 | 0 | 646 | 31 |
| 2017-2018 | 1 | 58 | 23 | 16 | 1 | 673 | 32 |
| 2016-2017 | 1 | 62 | 21 | 15 | 2 | 671 | 28 |
| 2015-2016 | 2 | 54 | 24 | 12 | 2 | 689 | 26 |
| 2014-2015 | 2 | 56 | 22 | 20 | 2 | 695 | 28 |
| 2013-2014 | 3 | 51 | 20 | 28 | 2 | 673 | 30 |
| 2012-2013 | 3 | 40 | 20 | 24 | 1 | 739 | 14 |
| 2011-2012 | 3 | 42 | 19 | 21 | 1 | 758 | 5 |
| 2010-2011 | 4 | 34 | 14 | 11 | 1 | 806 | 0 |

== Notable alumni ==
- Bryson Kuzdzal (2023), college football running back for the Michigan Wolverines
