= Forest Hills, Michigan =

- Census-designated place (CDP) & unincorporated community
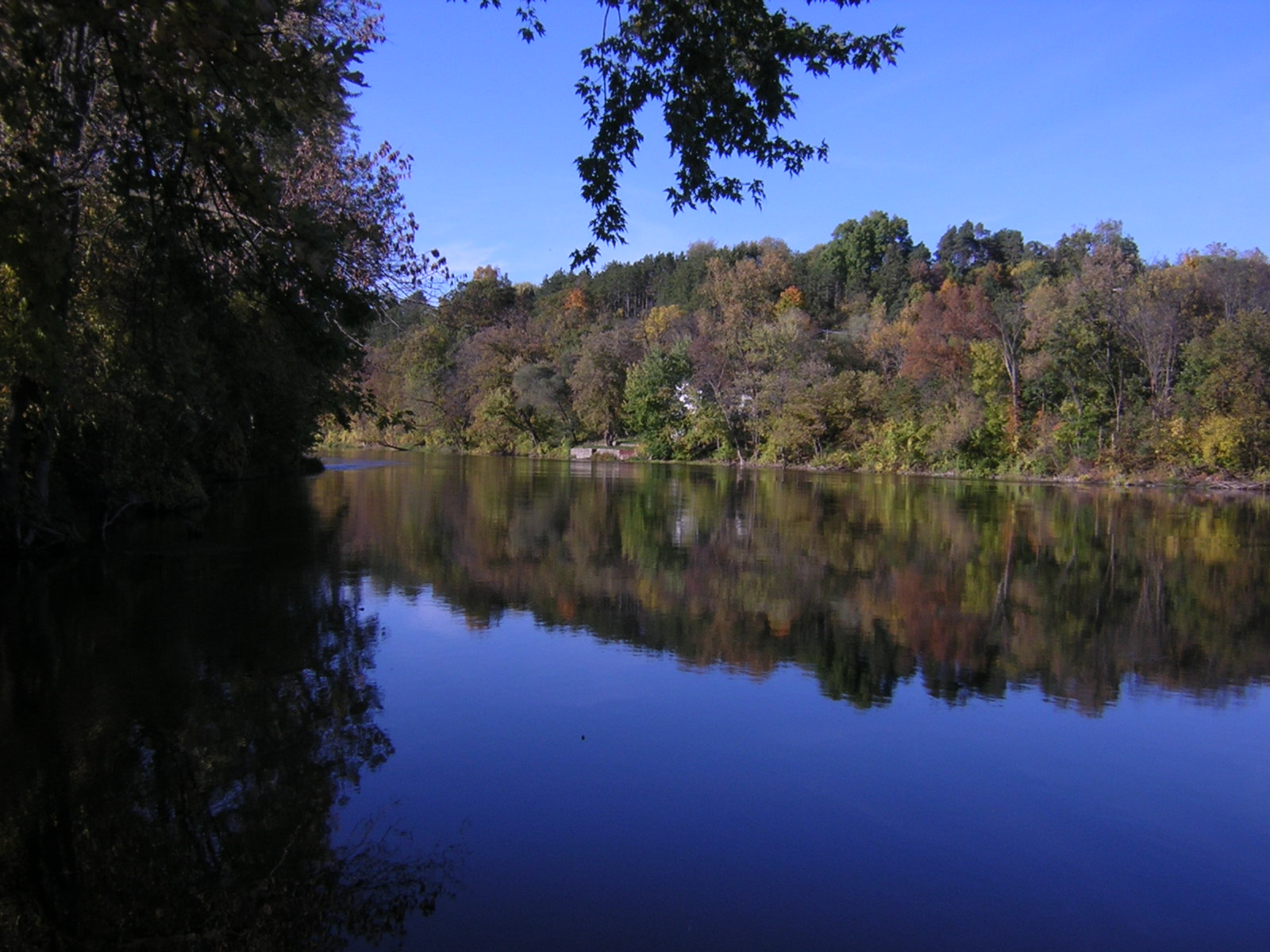
- The Grand River passing through Forest Hills

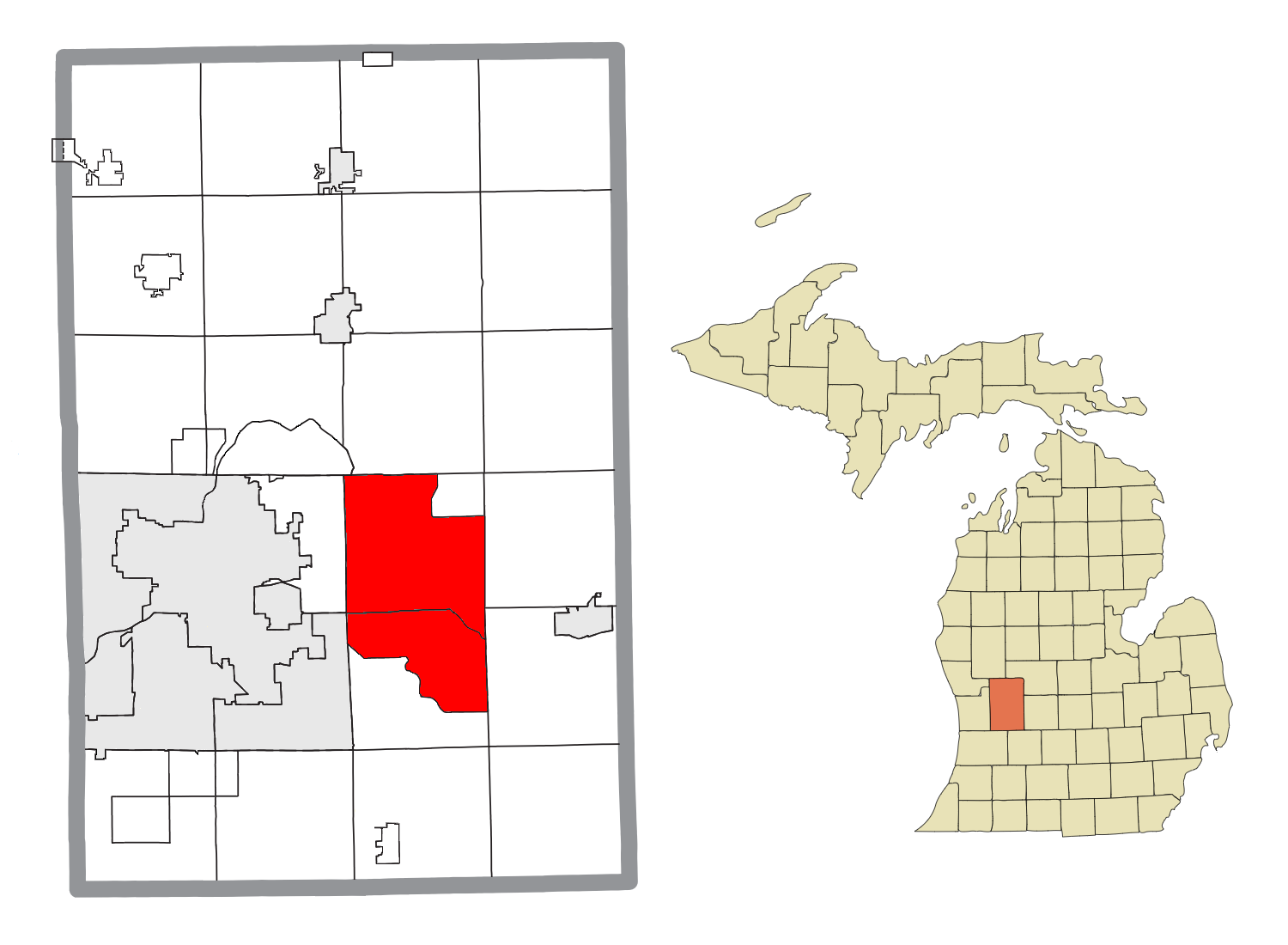
- Location within Kent County

- Location within the state of Michigan Location within the United States
- Coordinates: 42°56′54″N 85°29′32″W
- Country: United States
- State: Michigan
- County: Kent
- Townships: Ada and Cascade

Area
  - Total: 50.80 sq mi (131.58 km^{2})
  - Land: 49.30 sq mi (127.68 km^{2})
  - Water: 1.51 sq mi (3.90 km^{2})
- Elevation: 630 ft (192 m)

Population (2020)
  - Total: 28,573
  - Density: 579.6/sq mi (223.78/km^{2})
- Time zone: UTC-5 (Eastern (EST))
  - Summer (DST): UTC-4 (EDT)
- ZIP code(s): 49301 (Ada); 49331 (Lowell); 49525 (Grand Rapids); 49546 (Grand Rapids)
- Area code: 616
- FIPS code: 26-29580
- GNIS feature ID: 1867318

Forest Hills is an unincorporated community and census-designated place (CDP) in Kent County in the U.S. state of Michigan. The population was 28,573 at the 2020 census, making it the most populous CDP in Michigan. It is also the largest CDP by area in the state of Michigan, encompassing nearly all of Ada Township and most of the northern half of Cascade Township. The Forest Hills Public Schools District serves most of the community.

== Geography ==
According to the U.S. Census Bureau, the CDP has a total area of 50.80 square miles (131.57 km^{2}), of which 49.27 square miles (127.61 km^{2}) are land and 1.53 square miles (3.96 km^{2}) (3.01%) is water.

The Grand River crosses the community from the east side to the northwest corner.

=== Major highways ===
- I-96 forms portions of the southernmost boundary of the community.
- M-11 runs west and ends at I-96 at the southwestern corner of the community but does not run through the community.
- M-21 runs east–west through the center of the community.

== Demographics ==
Historical population
Census	Pop.	Note	%±
2010	20,942		—
2020	28,573		36.4%
U.S. Decennial Census

=== 2020 census ===
As of the 2020 census, Forest Hills had a population of 28,573. The median age was 41.4 years. 26.9% of residents were under the age of 18 and 16.9% of residents were 65 years of age or older. For every 100 females there were 98.3 males, and for every 100 females age 18 and over there were 96.2 males age 18 and over.

72.1% of residents lived in urban areas, while 27.9% lived in rural areas.

There were 9,868 households in Forest Hills, of which 39.0% had children under the age of 18 living in them. Of all households, 73.7% were married-couple households, 8.8% were households with a male householder and no spouse or partner present, and 14.6% were households with a female householder and no spouse or partner present. About 14.9% of all households were made up of individuals and 8.1% had someone living alone who was 65 years of age or older.

There were 10,226 housing units, of which 3.5% were vacant. The homeowner vacancy rate was 0.7% and the rental vacancy rate was 7.3%.

Racial composition as of the 2020 census
Race	Number	Percent
White	24,866	87.0%
Black or African American	382	1.3%
American Indian and Alaska Native	49	0.2%
Asian	1,422	5.0%
Native Hawaiian and Other Pacific Islander	9	0.0%
Some other race	217	0.8%
Two or more races	1,628	5.7%
Hispanic or Latino (of any race)	794	2.8%

=== 2000 census ===
As of the census of 2000, there were 20,942 people, 7,105 households, and 6,046 families residing in the community. The population density was 424.0 inhabitants per square mile (163.7/km^{2}). There were 7,371 housing units at an average density of 149.3 per square mile (57.6/km^{2}). The racial makeup of the community was 95.28% White, 0.64% African American, 0.20% Native American, 2.63% Asian, 0.34% from other races, and 0.91% from two or more races. Hispanic or Latino of any race were 0.95% of the population.

There were 7,105 households, out of which 44.2% had children under the age of 18 living with them, 78.6% were married couples living together, 4.8% had a female householder with no husband present, and 14.9% were non-families. 12.7% of all households were made up of individuals, and 4.9% had someone living alone who was 65 years of age or older. The average household size was 2.94 and the average family size was 3.23.

In the community, the population was spread out, with 31.4% under the age of 18, 4.9% from 18 to 24, 25.6% from 25 to 44, 29.4% from 45 to 64, and 8.8% who were 65 years of age or older. The median age was 39 years. For every 100 females, there were 99.3 males. For every 100 females age 18 and over, there were 96.1 males.

The median income for a household in the community was $96,150 (2007 estimate), and the median income for a family was $106,521. Males had a median income of $68,003 versus $37,553 for females. The per capita income for the community was $39,517. About 1.3% of families and 2.0% of the population were below the poverty line, including 1.7% of those under age 18 and 3.9% of those age 65 or over.
