= Bryson Kuzdzal =

American football player (born 2005)

No. 24 – Michigan Wolverines
- Position: Running back
- Class: Senior

Personal information
- Born: June 22, 2005 (age 21)
- Listed height: 5 ft 11 in (1.80 m)
- Listed weight: 205 lb (93 kg)

Career information
- High school: Forest Hills Eastern (Ada, Michigan)
- College: Michigan (2023–present)

Awards and highlights
- CFP national champion (2023)
- Stats at ESPN

Bryson Kuzdzal (born June 22, 2005) is an American college football running back for the Michigan Wolverines.

== Early life ==
Kuzdzal attended Forest Hills Eastern High School in Ada, Michigan where he played football, basketball and track and field. He was a member of the Division 2 MHSAA state runner-up track and field team. During his senior year he rushed for 1,379 yards and 22 touchdowns, averaging 10.4 yards per carry.

== College career ==
On November 3, 2022, Kuzdzal accepted a preferred walk-on offer to play college football at the University of Michigan. Kuzdzal did not see any game action during his freshman year. During the 2024 season, in his redshirt freshman year, he appeared in six games on special teams. He made his collegiate debut on September 7, 2024, against Texas. He scored his first career touchdown on September 13, 2025, against Central Michigan. On November 15, 2025, he rushed for a then career-high 53 yards on 15 carries against Northwestern at Wrigley Field after an injury to starter Jordan Marshall. During the final drive in the fourth quarter he carried the ball on four plays setting up Dominic Zvada's game-winning field goal as time expired. The following week, Marshall was a game-time decision, and was replaced by Kuzdzal. On November 22, 2025, he had 20 carries for a career-high 100 yards and three touchdowns against Maryland. He appeared in nine games during the 2025 season, getting more time as the season went on and starters Justice Haynes and Jordan Marshall suffered injuries. He had 76 carries for 326 yards and four touchdowns. On January 5, 2026, he entered the NCAA transfer portal, but would withdraw his name by January 20, 2026 to return to Michigan.
