= Forest Hills Northern High School =

Location
- 3801 Leonard NE; Grand Rapids, Kent County, Michigan 49525; United States; 42°59′07″N 85°34′35″W

Information
- Type: Public
- Established: 1972
- School district: Forest Hills Public Schools
- NCES School ID: 2614610
- Principal: Heather McKinney-Rewa
- Teaching staff: 69.2 (on an FTE basis)
- Grades: 9–12
- Enrollment: 1109 (2023–24)
- Student to teacher ratio: 16.03
- Colors: Columbia blue, black and white
- Athletics conference: Ottawa-Kent Conference
- Nickname: Huskies
- Website: www.fhps.net/northernhs
- Last updated: January 24, 2025

Forest Hills Northern High School is a public high school in Grand Rapids, Michigan, United States. It is one of three high schools in the Forest Hills Public Schools district, the other two being Forest Hills Central High School and Forest Hills Eastern High School.

== Academics ==
=== Curriculum ===
To graduate, students must receive twenty-two and one-half (22.5) credits. The minimum graduation requirements for Forest Hills Northern include four credits of English; four credits of mathematics; three credits of science; three credits of social science; one credit of physical education and health; one credit of visual, performing, applied arts; and two credits of a foreign language.

The school offers several Advanced Placement (AP) courses. Each semester, students who take an AP course will have 0.021 added to their cumulative grade point average. The school also offers a project-based learning program called Project Next, which involves students identifying and solving real-world problems. Forest Hills Northern has language immersion programs for Spanish and Mandarin Chinese.

=== Recognition ===
The 2024 U.S. News & World Report high school rankings listed Forest Hills Northern as #612 in its National Rankings and #14 in its Michigan High School Rankings.

In 2023, Forest Hills Northern was among the 20 Michigan schools with the highest SAT scores.

== Extracurriculars ==
=== Athletics ===
In athletics, the school competes as a member of the Ottawa-Kent Conference. Forest Hills Northern offers the following varsity Michigan High School Athletic Association (MHSAA) sports:

- Baseball (boys)
- Basketball (girls and boys)
- Bowling (girls and boys)
- Cross country (girls and boys)
- Football (boys)
- Golf (girls and boys)
- Gymnastics (girls)
- Ice Hockey (boys)
- Lacrosse (girls and boys)
- Skiing (girls and boys)
- Soccer (girls and boys)
- Softball (girls)
- Swimming and diving (girls and boys)
- Tennis (girls and boys)
- Track and field (girls and boys)
- Volleyball (girls)
- Wrestling (boys)

Additionally, the school offers a co-ed rowing club with varsity status in the spring athletic season.

=== Clubs ===
The Michael Sadler Foundation launched a new program called GameChang3rs at Forest Hills Northern in 2019. The program involves high-school volunteers, called "ambassadors", teaching younger students about leadership, academics, service, character, teamwork and resilience. The GameChang3rs initiative is dedicated to Michael Sadler, a Michigan State football player who died in a car crash in 2016.

== Demographics ==
The demographic breakdown of the 1,134 students enrolled in 2023-2024 was:

- Male - 50.8%
- Female - 49.2%
- Asian - 9.6%
- Black - 6.3%
- Hispanic - 7.7%
- White - 70.9%
- Native Hawaiian/Pacific Islander - 0.2%
- Multiracial - 5.2%

18.9% of the students were eligible for free or reduced-cost lunch.

== Notable alumni ==
- Chris Afendoulis, former Republican Member of the Michigan House of Representatives
- Johnny Benson Jr., NASCAR racing driver
- Trinidad Chambliss, college football quarterback for the Ole Miss Rebels
- Lauren Kozal, National Women's Soccer League (NWSL) goalkeeper
- Mitch Lyons, National Football League (NFL) tight end
- Aidan O'Connor, Major League Soccer defender
- Steve Scheffler, National Basketball Association (NBA) player
- Jared Veldheer, National Football League (NFL) offensive tackle

== In popular culture ==
Forest Hills Northern High School is prominently featured in the Hallmark Hall of Fame television movie A Smile as Big as the Moon. The movie is based on the 2002 memoir of the same name, which was written by a special-education teacher and football coach at Forest Hills Northern, Mike Kersjes. Both the memoir and the movie recount Kersjes's experiences as he works to take his special-education class to Space Camp.
