= Cascade Township, Michigan =

- Charter township
- Cascade Charter Township
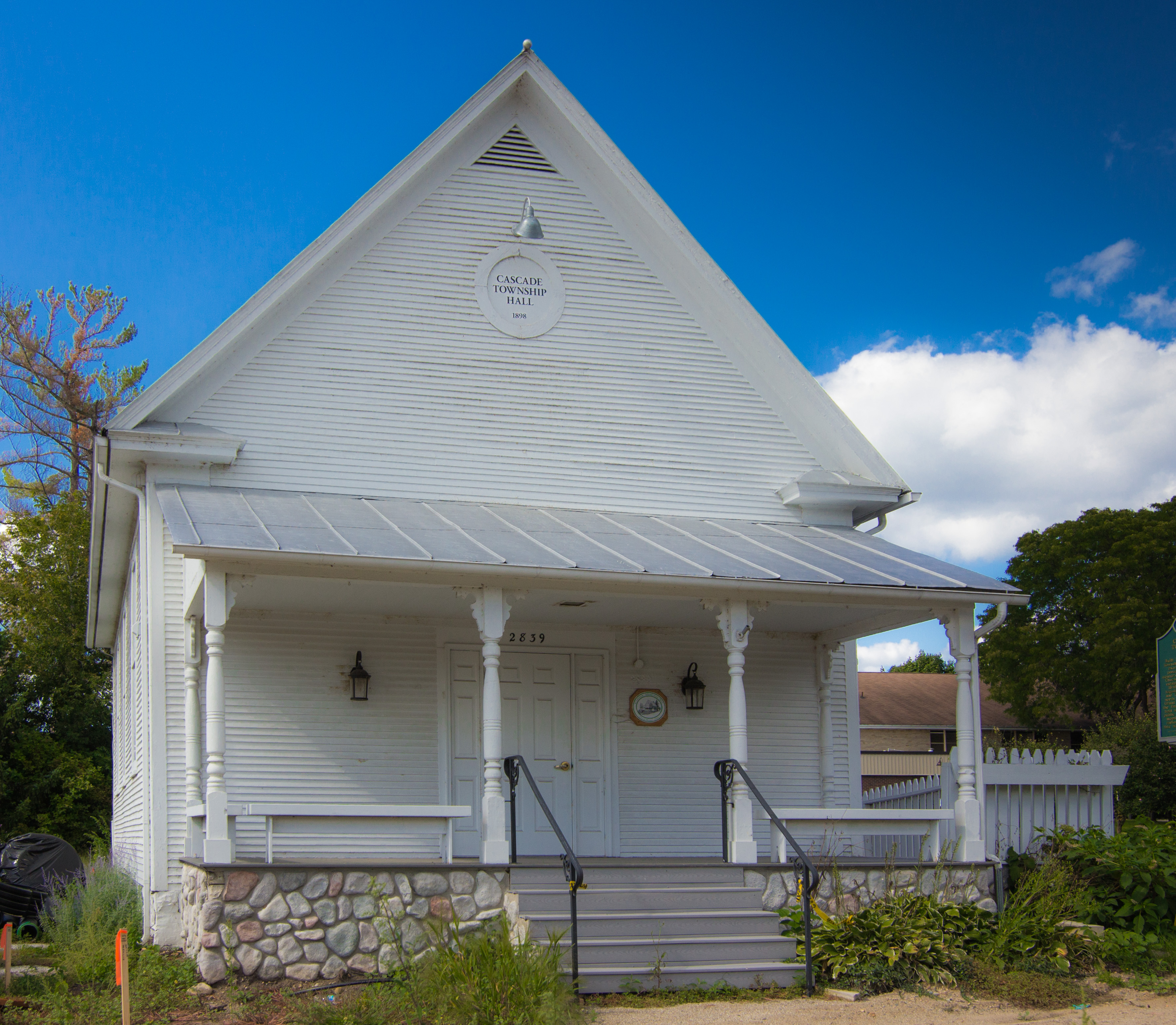
- Former township hall in Cascade Township
- Motto: "Serene vistas... Plentiful trees... Two rivers... One community"
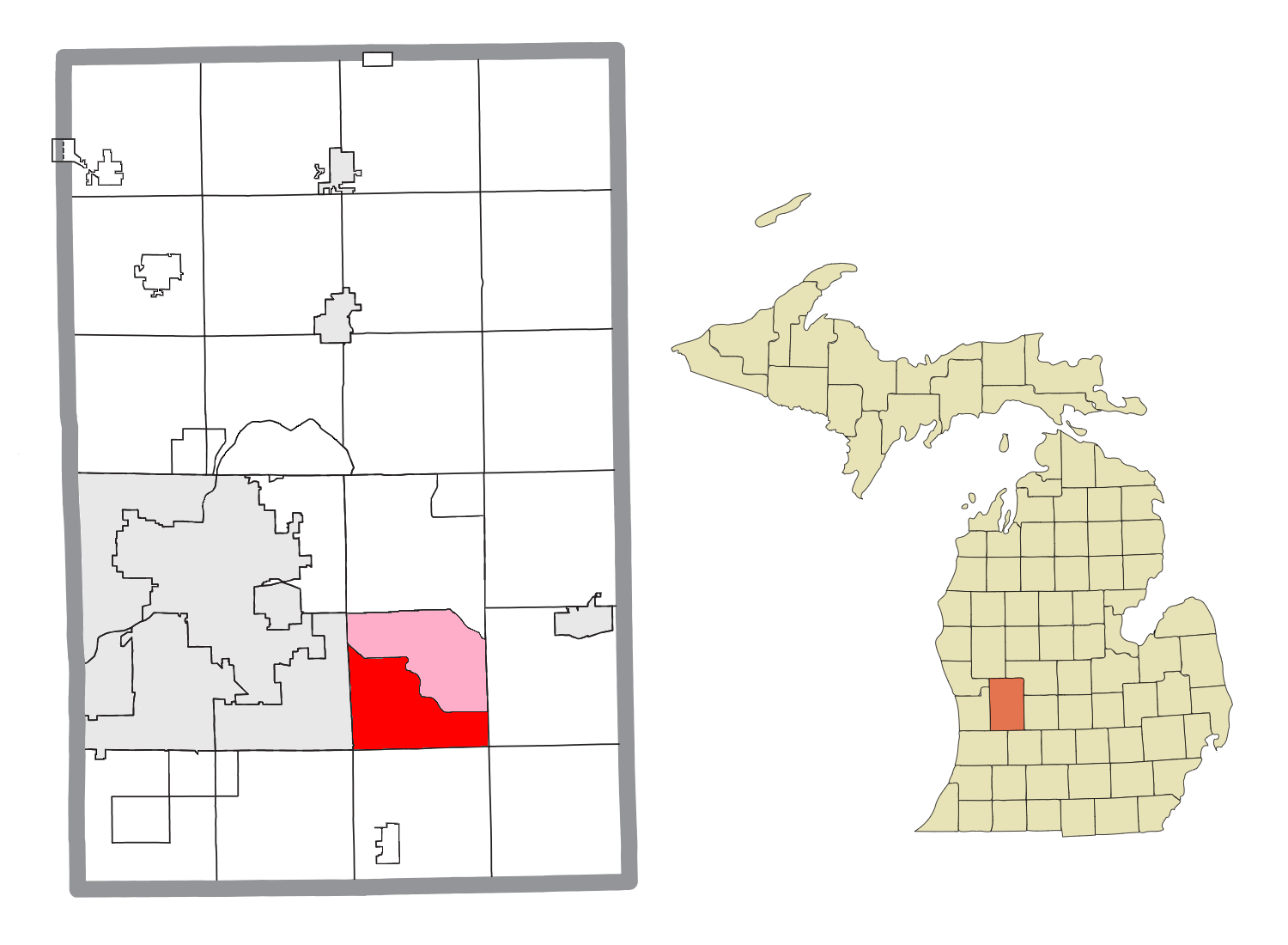
- Location within Kent County (red) and an administered portion of the Forest Hills CDP (pink)

- Location within the state of Michigan Location within the United States
- Coordinates: 42°54′09″N 85°29′42″W
- Country: United States
- State: Michigan
- County: Kent
- Established: 1848

Government
  - Supervisor: Grace Lesperance
  - Clerk: Susan Slater

Area
  - Total: 34.86 sq mi (90.29 km^{2})
  - Land: 33.88 sq mi (87.75 km^{2})
  - Water: 0.98 sq mi (2.54 km^{2})
- Elevation: 663 ft (202 m)

Population (2020)
  - Total: 19,667
  - Density: 580.5/sq mi (224.1/km^{2})
- Time zone: UTC-5 (Eastern (EST))
  - Summer (DST): UTC-4 (EDT)
- ZIP code(s): 49301 (Ada); 49302 (Alto); 49512 (Grand Rapids); 49546 (Grand Rapids)
- Area code: 616
- FIPS code: 26-081-13660
- GNIS feature ID: 1626037
- Website: Official website

Cascade Charter Township is a charter township of Kent County in the U.S. state of Michigan. The population was 19,667 at the 2020 census.

The township is part of the Grand Rapids metropolitan area and is located just east of the city of Grand Rapids. The township is the location of Gerald R. Ford International Airport.

== Communities ==
- Cascade is an unincorporated community within the township at the intersection of 28th Street and Cascade Road. Cascade was initially platted in 1845 by D. S. T. Weller. It had a post office from 1854 until 1910.
- Forest Hills is an unincorporated community and census-designated place that occupies the northern half of the township. The CDP consists of 17.81 square miles (46.13 km^{2}) (51.09%) of the township's area and 12,917 township residents (75.39%) at the 2010 census. Forest Hills is organized for statistical purposes only and also contains a large area of Ada Township to the north. It is the largest CDP in the state of Michigan in both area and population.

== History ==
The township was originally a part of Ada Township and was separately organized in 1848.

The Whitney Tavern Stand is located within the township. It was built in 1853 and is listed on the National Register of Historic Places.

== Geography ==
According to the U.S. Census Bureau, the township has a total area of 34.86 square miles (90.29 km^{2}), of which 33.88 square miles (87.75 km^{2}) is land and 0.98 square miles (2.54 km^{2}) (2.81%) is water.

The township is situated in the southeastern section of Kent County, approximately 10 miles (16 km) southeast of Grand Rapids. A defining feature of the township is the Thornapple River, which divides the township into east and west halves. The township is bordered to the west by the city of Kentwood, to the north by Ada Township, to the east by Lowell Charter Township, and to the south by Caledonia Charter Township.

== Transportation ==
=== Airport ===
- Gerald R. Ford International Airport is a commercial airport that occupies 4.89 square miles (12.67 km^{2}) of the southwestern portion of the township.

=== Major highways ===
- I-96 runs east–west through the center of the township.
- M-6 enters at the southern portion of the township and has its eastern terminus at I-96.
- M-37 (Broadmoor Avenue) enters briefly at the southwestern corner of the township.

== Education ==
The township is served by three public school districts. Caledonia Community Schools serves the southern portion of the township. Most of the township is served by Forest Hills Public Schools, and Lowell Area Schools serves a small eastern portion of the township.

West Michigan Aviation Academy is a charter high school located within the township.

== Demographics ==
=== 2020 census ===
As of the 2020 United States census, the township had a population of 19,667 people. The racial makeup was 87.1% Non-Hispanic White, 2.8% Black or African American, 4.0% Asian, 0.1% Native American, and 2.8% from two or more races. Hispanic or Latino people of any race were 4.2% of the population.

=== 2000 census ===
As of the census of 2000, there were 15,107 people, 5,394 households, and 4,374 families residing in the township. The population density was 445.7 inhabitants per square mile (172.1/km^{2}). There were 5,638 housing units at an average density of 166.3 per square mile (64.2/km^{2}). The racial makeup of the township was 94.55% White, 1.00% African American, 0.28% Native American, 3.06% Asian, 0.26% from other races, and 0.85% from two or more races. Hispanic or Latino of any race were 0.87% of the population.

There were 5,394 households, out of which 39.3% had children under the age of 18 living with them, 75.1% were married couples living together, 4.5% had a female householder with no husband present, and 18.9% were non-families. 16.7% of all households were made up of individuals, and 8.0% had someone living alone who was 65 years of age or older. The average household size was 2.80 and the average family size was 3.16.

In the township the population was spread out, with 29.4% under the age of 18, 4.7% from 18 to 24, 23.8% from 25 to 44, 30.8% from 45 to 64, and 11.4% who were 65 years of age or older. The median age was 41 years. For every 100 females, there were 98.4 males. For every 100 females age 18 and over, there were 94.8 males.

The median income for a household in the township was $87,290, and the median income for a family was $98,013. Males had a median income of $71,960 versus $37,234 for females. The per capita income for the township was $39,470. About 1.5% of families and 2.3% of the population were below the poverty line, including 2.3% of those under age 18 and 3.4% of those age 65 or over.

== Notable people ==
- Justin Amash, lawyer and politician, who served as the U.S. representative for Michigan's 3rd congressional district from 2011 to 2021.
