= Forest Hills Central High School =

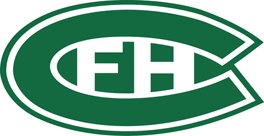

Location
- 5901 Hall St SE; Grand Rapids, Michigan 49546; United States; 42°56′37″N 85°31′22″W

Information
- Type: Public high school
- Established: 1958 (first graduating class 1961)
- Principal: Jonathan Haga
- Teaching staff: 53.60 (on an FTE basis)
- Grades: 9–12
- Enrollment: 1,033 (2023-2024)
- Student to teacher ratio: 19.27
- Campus type: Suburban
- Colors: Forest green and white
- Athletics conference: Ottawa-Kent Conference White Division
- Nickname: Rangers
- Website: www.fhps.net/high-schools/central

Forest Hills Central High School is located in Ada Township, Michigan, near Grand Rapids. It is one of three high schools in the Forest Hills Public Schools system. The district also includes Forest Hills Eastern High School and Forest Hills Northern High School.

== History ==
Forest Hills Central High School (originally "Forest Hills High School") became the first high school of the newly formed Forest Hills School District in the fall of 1958. The school opened in September with only freshman and sophomore students. The first graduating class was in 1961.

The school was notable for its campus-style construction, which eventually consisted of thirteen separate buildings, including an auditorium added in 1977. The classroom buildings were designed as long hallways connecting five or six individual rooms. However, Michigan winters were not well suited to the open campus design, requiring students to walk outside between buildings. In addition, the student population continued to grow, and the buildings began to deteriorate.

In 1986, Central High was completely rebuilt, with the exception of the auditorium, gymnasium, cafeteria, and art and industrial arts wing, all of which were incorporated into a new building. Since that time, the school has undergone numerous construction and renovation projects.

In 2009, the building underwent a multimillion-dollar construction project that included a new weight room, student and staff parking lots, a renovated main office, an athletic field entrance, an athletic office, additional classrooms, and a new gym entrance and foyer. Heated sidewalks were also installed at the gym entrance. In 2010, the auditorium was remodeled. Beginning in 2025, the school has been under an extensive multi-million dollar renovation project, completely remodeling most of the campus's main building.

== Demographics ==
The demographic breakdown of the 1,315 students enrolled in 2015-16 was:

GENDER

- Male - 49.0%
- Female - 51.0%

ETHNIC BACKGROUND

- Native American/Alaskan - 0.3%
- Asian - 6.2%
- Black - 2.5%
- Hispanic - 1.7%
- White - 85.6%
- Multiracial - 3.7%

7.1% of the students were eligible for free or reduced-cost lunch. During the 2026-2027 school year, all students will receive free meals, regardless of federal income requirements.

== Athletics ==
Forest Hills Central's athletic teams compete under the "Rangers" mascot. Most teams compete in the Ottawa-Kent Conference White division. Forest Hills Central offers the following varsity sports:

=== Boys' sports ===
- Baseball
- Basketball
- Bowling
- Cross-country
- Football – 1994, 2022 state runner-up Division 2, 2023 Champions Division 3
- Golf – 1982, 1985, 1987, 1988, 2010 state runner-up, 2009, 2011 state champions
- Hockey
- Lacrosse – 2007 was the first year of competition separate from Forest Hills Northern. Prior to that, the two schools fielded a combined team. 1990 state champions, 2008 runners-up. 2010 Division II State Champions. 2012 Division II State Champions 2013 Division II state runners-up. 2016 State Champions, 2018 Runner Up State Champions, 2019 State Champions, 2022 State Champions, 2023 State Champions.
- Skiing – 1996 state champions
- Rowing — 2022 JV4+ SRAA Nationals 3rd place medalist, 2023 Varsity 4+ SRAA Nationals 3rd place medalist
- Soccer – 2004, 2015 state champions
- Swimming and diving
- Tennis – 1998, 2003, 2014, 2015 state champions; 2001, 2002, 2011, 2012, 2016 runner-up
- Wrestling

=== Girls' sports ===
- Basketball
- Bowling
- Cross-country
- Competitive cheer
- Field hockey
- Golf
- Gymnastics
- Lacrosse
- Rowing – 2022 JV8+ SRAA Nationals 7th place finisher
- Skiing – 2017 state champions
- Soccer – 2005, 2007, 2008, 2017, 2022 state champions; 2003 runner-up
- Softball
- Swimming and diving – 1993, 1994 state champions, 1995, 2007 runner-up
- Tennis – 1985, 2023 state runner-up
- Track and field
- Volleyball – 1986, 1987 state runner-up
- Water polo
- Wrestling – 2020 state champions

=== Other Sports: ===
- Equestrian Team

== Weekend education ==
The Grand Rapids Supplemental School (グランドラピッズ補習授業校 Gurando Rappizu Hoshū Jugyō Kō), a part-time Japanese school, holds its classes at the high school.

== Notable alumni ==
- Adam Grinwis (born 1992, class of 2010), professional soccer player
- Reed Timmer (born 1980, class of 1998) American meteorologist and storm chaser.
- Kyle Visser (born 1985, class of 2003), professional basketball player
- Gretchen Whitmer (born 1971, class of 1989), 49th Governor of Michigan
- Annette Ziegler (born 1964, class of 1982), Chief Justice of the Wisconsin Supreme Court
- Kim Zimmer (born 1955), actress, Guiding Light and Santa Barbara

== In popular culture ==
In the film American Pie, the "Central Chicks" and "Central" Lacrosse team that East Great Falls High School plays against is an amalgam of Forest Hills Central High School. East Great Falls, in turn, is based on the nearby East Grand Rapids High School.
