= Gerald R. Ford International Airport =

Grand Rapids Gerald R. Ford International Airport

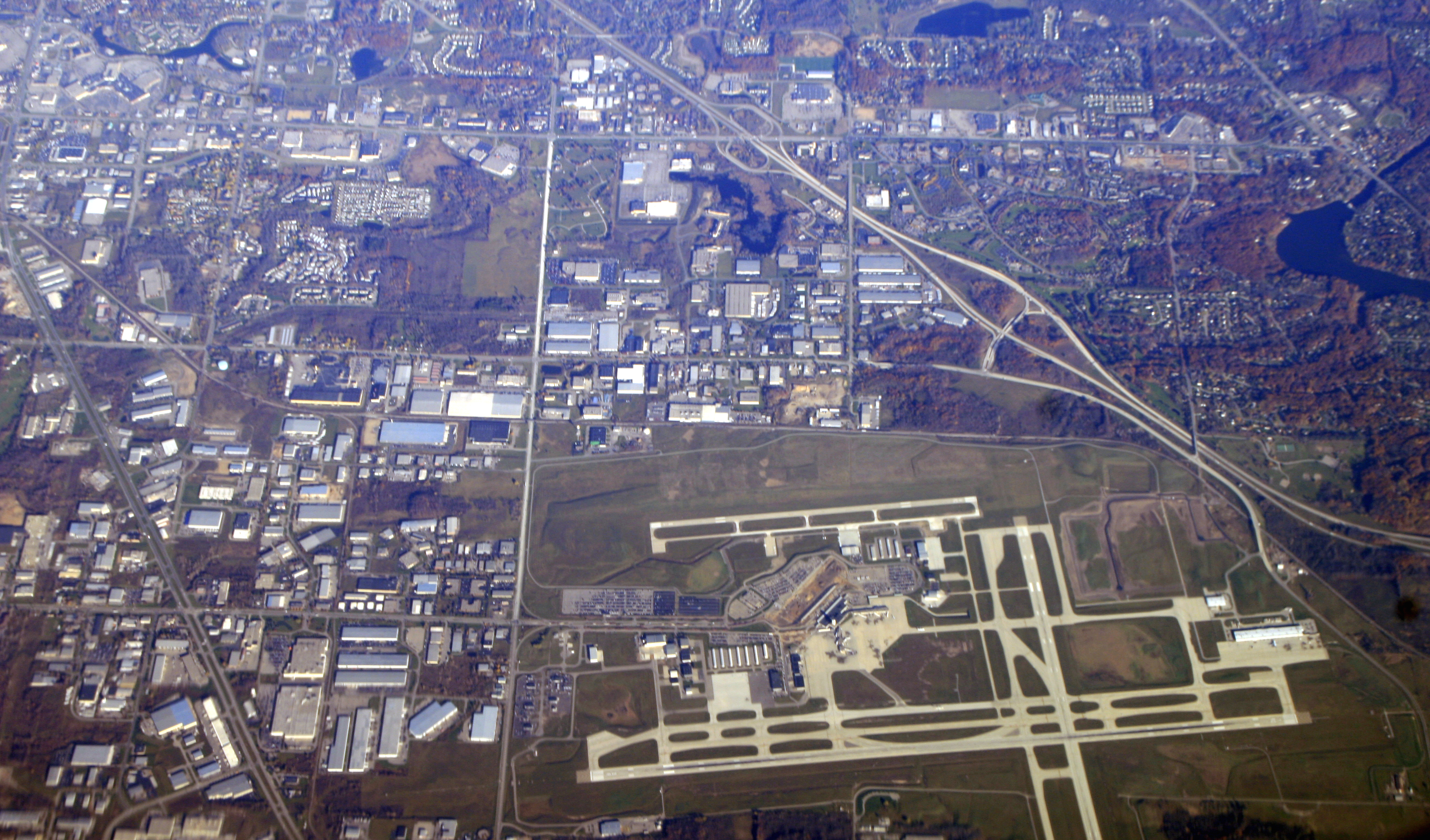
- Gerald R. Ford International Airport
- IATA: GRR; ICAO: KGRR; FAA LID: GRR

Summary
- Airport type: Public
- Owner: Gerald R. Ford International Airport Authority & Kent County
- Operator: Gerald R. Ford International Airport Authority
- Serves: Grand Rapids, Michigan, US
- Location: Cascade Charter Township, Michigan, US
- Opened: November 1919; 107 years ago
- Operating base for: Allegiant Air
- Elevation AMSL: 794 ft (242 m)
- Coordinates: 42°52′51″N 85°31′22″W
- Website: www.grr.org

Maps
- FAA airport diagram
- Interactive map of Grand Rapids Gerald R. Ford International Airport

Runways
Direction	Length		Surface
Direction	ft	m	Surface
08R/26L	10,001	3,048	Concrete
08L/26R	5,001	1,524	Concrete
17/35	8,501	2,591	Concrete

Statistics (2024)
- Total passengers: 4,303,696 ▲3.15%
- Aircraft movements: 80,849 ▲5.1%
- Total cargo (lbs.): 47,386,884
- Sources: The airport and FAA

Grand Rapids Gerald R. Ford International Airport (IATA: GRR, ICAO: KGRR, FAA LID: GRR) is a commercial airport in Cascade Township, approximately 13 miles (21 km) southeast of Grand Rapids, Michigan, United States. The facility is owned by the Kent County Board of Commissioners and managed by an independent authority. The US Federal Aviation Administration (FAA) National Plan of Integrated Airport Systems for 2017–2021 categorized it as a small hub primary commercial service facility.

The facility opened as the Kent County Airport, but later, in December 1999, the airport was renamed for Gerald R. Ford, the 38th president of the United States. Ford represented the Grand Rapids area in the United States House of Representatives from 1949 to 1973.

As of September 2025, GRR had flights to 39 airports in the United States. It is the primary commercial airport in West Michigan. It is the second-busiest airport in Michigan, after Detroit Metropolitan Airport. GRR covers 3,127 acres (1,265 ha).

== History ==
Grand Rapids' first airport broke ground in November 1919, four miles (6.4 km) south of downtown. This was eight years after the area witnessed its first landing, a Wright biplane at Comstock Park State Fairgrounds on September 10, 1911. The airport was operated by the Kent County Board of Supervisors.

The first scheduled air service in the United States was between Grand Rapids and Dearborn on a Ford-Stout monoplane named Miss Grand Rapids, which started July 26, 1926.

In 1938–39, the Works Progress Administration made improvements including adding new runways, runway widening, fencing, sodding, lighting, remodeling the administration building, and constructing a new restaurant.

Circa 1940, the airport extended between 32nd and 36th Streets, from Jefferson Avenue east to the railroad; the west end was soon expanded south to just north of Himes Street and in the 1950s runway 18/36 was extended to 5700’ and reached south to 44th Street. It expanded numerous times after the war. By 1956, however, county officials considered the possibility that the airport had no more room to grow. A year later, a consultant recommended building a new, larger airport at another site.

In 1959, the county began construction on the present airport in Cascade Township, several miles east of the first airport. The new airport opened November 23, 1963, and was dedicated June 6, 1964; it had a 6,600-foot (2,000 m) runway designated 08/26 and a 3,400-foot (1,000 m) designated 18/36. The first scheduled jet was a United Airlines Boeing 737-200 on April 28, 1968, from Chicago O'Hare. The aircraft, N9003U, was named City of Grand Rapids. In 1968, the only scheduled non-stops beyond Michigan were to Chicago and Green Bay.

On January 27, 1977, the Board of Commissioners renamed Kent County Airport as Kent County International Airport with the opening of a U.S. Customs Service Office in the main terminal building.

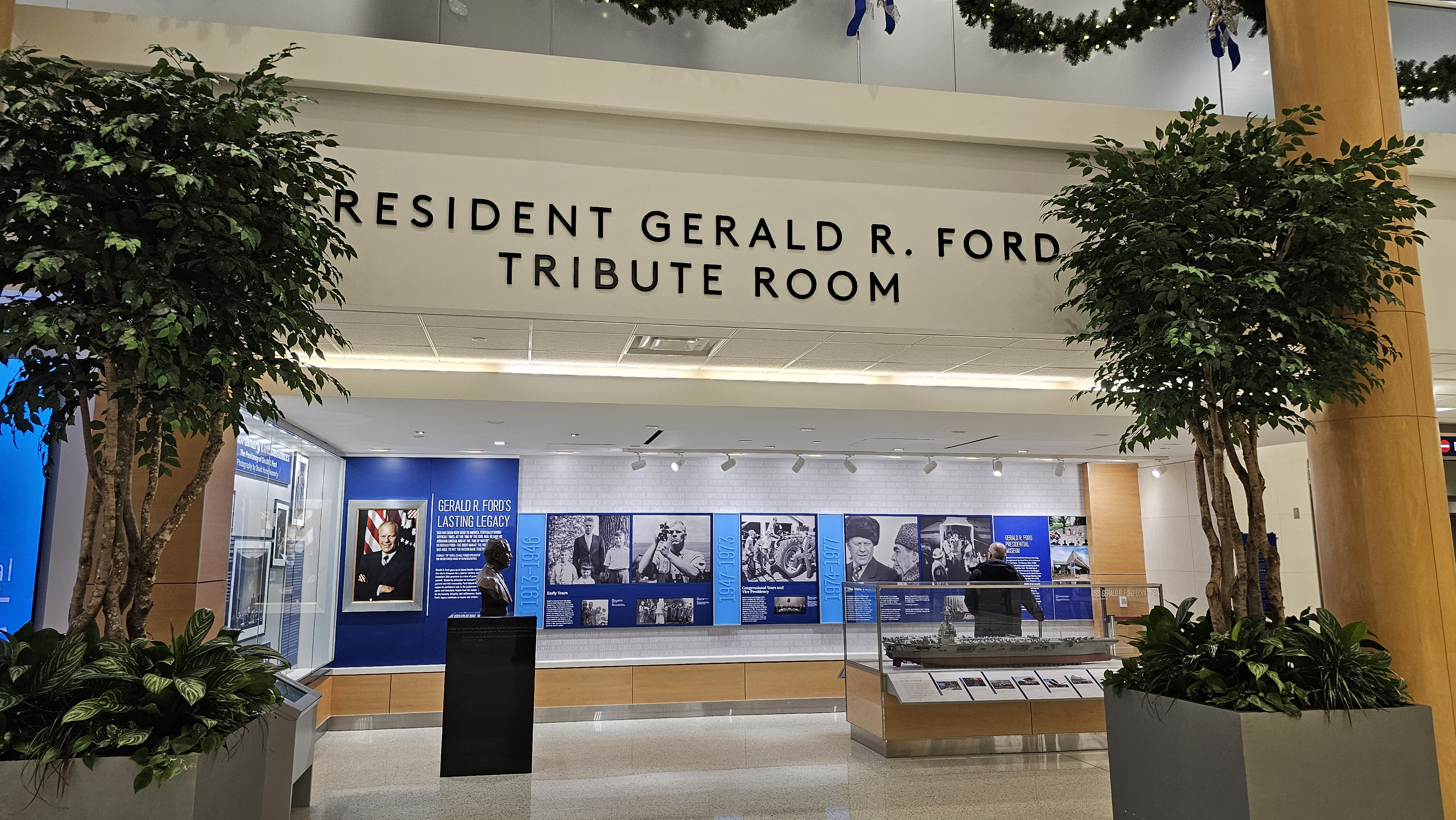
Tribute room for President Gerald Ford

In 2004, the airport served more than 2 million passengers for the first time in a year. In 2010, it broke the 2004 record with almost 2.2 million passengers, as increase of over 23% from 2009.

On January 2, 2007, a U.S. Air Force Boeing VC-25 jet carried the remains of former president Gerald Ford to his namesake airport as part of funeral services culminating in burial at his presidential museum in Grand Rapids the next day.

From April 2010 through October 2011, the airport was a focus city for Allegiant Air.

Air Canada operated the airport's only international flights to Toronto Pearson International Airport from July 2008 until September 2013. It was the airline's second attempt at service between the two markets.

Delta Air Lines used to operate Boeing 757-200s seasonally between Grand Rapids and Atlanta during the winter, making it the largest aircraft to serve GRR.

Allegiant Air announced in mid-January 2019 that they would be making the airport one of Allegiant's 16 focus cities once again. After dropping GRR as a focus city in 2011, Allegiant is upgrading GRR again to a focus city adding Nashville, Tennessee, and Savannah-Hilton Head, Georgia, as new routes. Allegiant would later add other new destinations such as Los Angeles, Boston, and Newark.

In 2013 the airport began building a natural treatment system to improve stormwater management practices and safeguard the waters of the Thornapple River. The new, innovative system will include a biological treatment system that will improve collection of stormwater runoff and naturally remove sediments and pollutants before sending the water to the Thornapple River, which flows just east of the airfield.

The airport eliminated the two separate security checkpoints in each concourse and created one consolidated checkpoint in the grand hall area to help traffic flow much faster and to be prepared for future growth. In addition, the grand hall area and the entrance area to the airport was renovated with more shopping and dining options. Work began in late 2015 and completed in June 2017.

The airport began construction of a roof over the parking deck in March 2015 to increase close-in, covered, long-term parking. The roof covers most of the fourth floor, though some spaces on the fourth and third floors remain uncovered due to airfield sight-line requirements for the FAA control tower. The garage roof was completed in November 2015 and will allow use of the fourth floor spaces during heavy snow.

In 2016, the airport partnered with the Cascade Community Foundation on plans to renovate the current outdoor viewing area to make it a larger, more inviting place for people to relax. The renovated park opened in May 2017.

In November 2018 the airport began the phase II of the Gateway Transformation Project, reconstructing the baggage claim, check-in, and front of house areas. It has completed the apron reconstruction, adding new pavement to the apron and taxiway areas.

In calendar year 2025, GRR set an all-time record with 4,303,696 passengers served, up 3.15% over 2024.

== Facilities ==
Gerald R. Ford International Airport has two parallel east–west runways and one north–south runway. Along with cargo and general aviation facilities, the airport has a passenger terminal with two concourses: A has 15 gates and B has eight. Runways 08R/26L and runway 17/35 have ILS. The airport also has a 5,000-foot (1,500 m) general aviation runway north of the main 08R/26L runway.

In September 2017, the airport celebrated the opening of phase one of their Gateway Transformation, a 59,000-square-foot (5,500 m^{2}) addition onto the passenger terminal facility that included a consolidated passenger security screening checkpoint, a new Marketplace with expanded retail and food & beverage offerings, new business centers and lounges, and much more. Concourse A's tenants are Delta Air Lines, American Airlines and United Airlines. Southwest Airlines, Sun Country Airlines, Frontier Airlines and Allegiant Air occupy Concourse B. All gates have climate-controlled jetways.

The airport is served by Signature Flight Support, which operates an FBO on the field. Besides fuel, the facility provides general maintenance, aircraft parking, courtesy and rental cars, conference rooms, pilot supplies, a crew lounge, snooze rooms, and more.

When new baggage screening regulations were introduced by the Transportation Security Administration in 2002, the airport was the first in the nation to conduct trials on the new screening machines. The baggage processing areas were too small for the machines so they were placed in the passenger lobby.

The airport is also home to the West Michigan Aviation Academy, a public charter high school that focuses on aviation, STEM, and robotics educations. The school offers a fleet of Cessna 172 aircraft for flight training, allows students to build a Carbon Cub EX2 plane, and has a Redbird LD flight simulator.

== Airlines and destinations ==
=== Passenger ===
Airlines	Destinations
Allegiant Air	Austin, Jacksonville (FL), Las Vegas, Orange County, Orlando/Sanford, Nashville, Philadelphia, Phoenix/Mesa, Punta Gorda (FL), Sarasota, St. Petersburg/Clearwater, West Palm Beach; Seasonal: Boston, Destin/Fort Walton Beach, Fort Lauderdale, Myrtle Beach, Newark, Portland (OR), Savannah
American Airlines	Charlotte, Chicago–O'Hare, Dallas/Fort Worth; Seasonal: Phoenix–Sky Harbor, Miami
American Eagle	Chicago–O'Hare, Philadelphia, Washington–National; Seasonal: Miami, New York–LaGuardia
Avelo Airlines	Lakeland
Delta Air Lines	Atlanta, Minneapolis/St. Paul
Delta Connection	Detroit, Minneapolis/St. Paul, New York–LaGuardia; Seasonal: Orlando
Frontier Airlines	Orlando; Seasonal: Atlanta, Denver, Fort Myers
Southwest Airlines	Baltimore, Chicago–Midway, Denver; Seasonal: Fort Myers, Las Vegas, Nashville, Orlando, Tampa
Sun Country Airlines	Seasonal: Minneapolis/St. Paul
United Airlines	Chicago–O'Hare, Denver
United Express	Chicago–O'Hare, Houston–Intercontinental, Newark

=== Cargo ===
Airlines	Destinations
FedEx Express	Memphis
FedEx Feeder operated by CSA Air	Pellston, Sault Ste. Marie (MI), Traverse City

== Statistics ==
=== Top Domestic Destinations ===
Busiest domestic routes from GRR (September 2025 – August 2026)
Rank	City	Passengers	Carriers
1	Chicago–O’Hare, Illinois	320,000	American, United
2	Atlanta, Georgia	209,000	Delta, Frontier
3	Denver, Colorado	179,000	Frontier, Southwest, United
4	Detroit, Michigan	138,000	Delta
5	Minneapolis/St. Paul, Minnesota	128,000	Delta, Sun Country
6	Dallas/Fort Worth, Texas	128,000	American
7	Charlotte, North Carolina	118,000	American
8	Chicago–Midway, Illinois	109,000	Southwest
9	Orlando–Sanford, Florida	64,000	Allegiant
10	St. Pete/Clearwater, Florida	62,000	Allegiant

=== Airline market share ===
Largest airlines at GRR (September 2025 – August 2026)
Rank	Airline	Passengers	Share
1	Allegiant Air	772,000	18.50%
2	American Airlines	647,000	15.51%
3	Delta Air Lines	554,000	13.28%
4	Southwest Airlines	508,000	12.19%
5	United Airlines	449,000	10.76%
-	Other*	1,241,000	29.76%

*Includes flights operated by American Eagle, Delta Connection, and United Express partner airlines. The specific airline total passenger numbers only include mainline operations.

=== Annual traffic ===
Annual passenger traffic (enplaned + deplaned) at GRR, 2003–present
Year	Passengers	Year	Passengers	Year	Passengers
2003	1,976,833	2012	2,134,956	2021	2,927,962
2004	2,150,125	2013	2,237,979	2022	3,468,156
2005	2,090,505	2014	2,335,105	2023	3,794,915
2006	2,015,846	2015	2,550,193	2024	4,172,068
2007	1,990,896	2016	2,653,630	2025	4,303,696
2008	1,809,445	2017	2,811,622	2026	
2009	1,771,465	2018	3,263,234	2027	
2010	2,185,924	2019	3,587,767	2028	
2011	2,275,332	2020	1,758,741	2029	

== Ground transportation ==
The airport is at the intersection of 44th Street and Patterson Avenue. It abuts I-96 on the east, M-6 on the south, M-37 on the west, and M-11 on the north.

Metro Cab and Metro Cars provides taxi and luxury sedan service and the airport is served by Avis, Budget, Enterprise, Hertz/Dollar, and National/Alamo rental car companies on-site.

Rapid route 27, Airport Industrial, travels between the airport and Woodland Mall (Kentwood Station) on weekdays between 6:00 a.m. and 10:00 p.m. From Woodland Mall, passengers can continue on to downtown or parts of the east side of Grand Rapids via routes 5 and 6, or across town to Grandville and Wyoming on routes 24, 28, and 44.

== Planned development ==
In late August 2019, the airport made an announcement about its next focus, Project Elevate. This phase of airport development, consisting of three major projects, includes a $90 million expansion and extension of Concourse A to encompass 8 more gates, a $50 million relocation and construction of a new air traffic control tower as well as a $25 million federal inspection station to facilitate departures and arrivals of direct international flights. As part of the concourse A expansion, some of the new tenants open including only one of two Freddy's that serve breakfast and a Priority Pass club lounge.

Project Elevate expanded with some additional projects that include a $156 million rental car facility and additional parking in a new ramp that was announced in 2023 and is expected to be completed by late 2025. And in April 2024, it was announced there would also be an $135 million Terminal Enhancement Project included as well expected to be completed by 2027

== Accidents and incidents ==
- On May 9, 2008, a Cessna 208 Caravan operating for Federal Express by CSA Air crashed just north of Grand Rapids. The pilot was not injured and there were no injuries on the ground.

== See also ==
- List of airports in Michigan
