= Lauren Kozal =

American soccer player (born 2000)

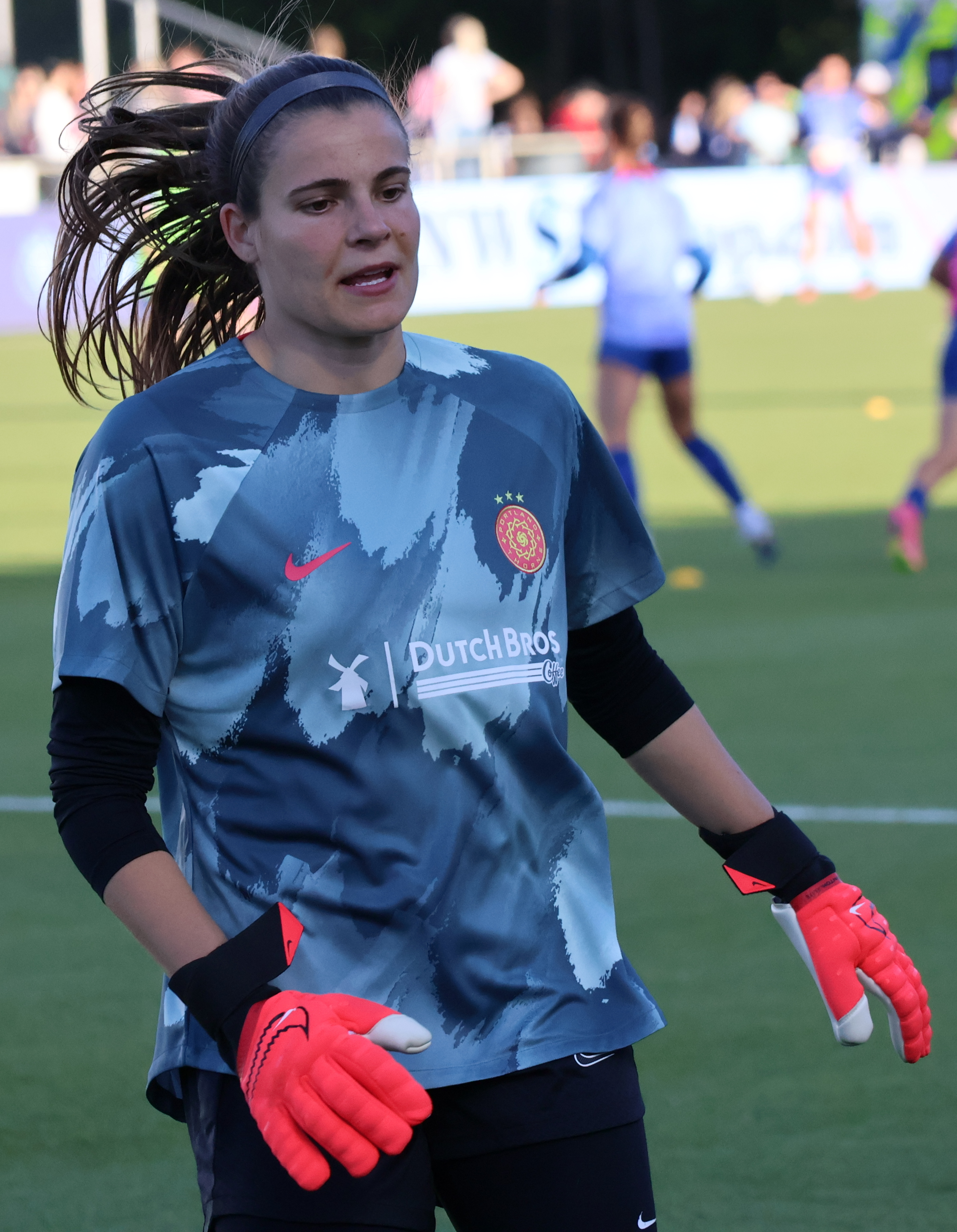
- Kozal with the Portland Thorns in 2024

Personal information
- Full name: Lauren Rose Kozal
- Date of birth: July 11, 2000 (age 26)
- Place of birth: Ada, Michigan, U.S.
- Height: 5 ft 10 in (1.78 m)
- Position: Goalkeeper

Team information
- Current team: HB Køge
- Number: 66

College career
Years	Team	Apps	(Gls)
2019–2022	Michigan State Spartans	70	(0)

Senior career*
Years	Team	Apps	(Gls)
2022	Midwest United	8	(0)
2023–2024	Portland Thorns	0	(0)
2024	→ Tampa Bay Sun (loan)	5	(0)
2025–2026	GC Zurich	30	(0)
2026–	HB Køge	0	(0)

International career^{‡}
2023	United States U-23	2	(0)
- * Club domestic league appearances and goals as of June 19, 2026 ‡ National team caps and goals as of November 13, 2023

Lauren Rose Kozal (born July 1, 2000) is an American professional soccer player who plays as a goalkeeper for Danish A-Liga club HB Køge. She played college soccer for the Michigan State Spartans.

== Early life ==
Kozal grew up in Ada, Michigan. She attended Forest Hills Northern High School, where she played varsity soccer and basketball. She was captain of the soccer team her junior year and a three-time captain of the women's basketball team. Kozal won four consecutive State Cup championships with Midwest United FC and was a member of the club's development academy.

== College career ==
Kozal attended Michigan State University. She made 70 appearances at goalkeeper for the Spartans from 2019 to 2022. She was twice named Big Ten Goalkeeper of the Year. In 2022, she was a semifinalist for the MAC Hermann Trophy and was elected unanimously to the All-Big Ten First Team.

== Club career ==
In 2022, Kozal made 8 appearances for Midwest United FC in the USL W League.

In 2023, she was drafted by Portland Thorns FC as the 32nd overall pick of the 2023 NWSL Draft. Kozal signed a one-year contract with the club, with an option for an additional year.

In September 2024, Portland loaned Kozal to USL Super League club Tampa Bay Sun FC for the remainder of the NWSL season. Kozal made her debut for the Sun in a 3–0 win over DC Power FC on October 2.On December 11, 2024, the Thorns announced Kozal's contract had expired and she was a free agent.

In January 2025, Kozal signed with Swiss club GC Zurich midway through the Swiss Women's Super League season.

After spending one-and-a-half years in Switzerland, Kozal moved to Danish A-Liga club HB Køge on June 19, 2026.

== International career ==
Lauren Kozal was called up to the United States under-23 team in February 2023 for two friendly matches against France. She made half-length appearances in both games.

== Honors ==
Individual

- NCAA Division I First-Team All-America: 2022
- Big Ten Conference Goalkeeper of the Year: 2022
