= Ada Township, Michigan =

- Civil township
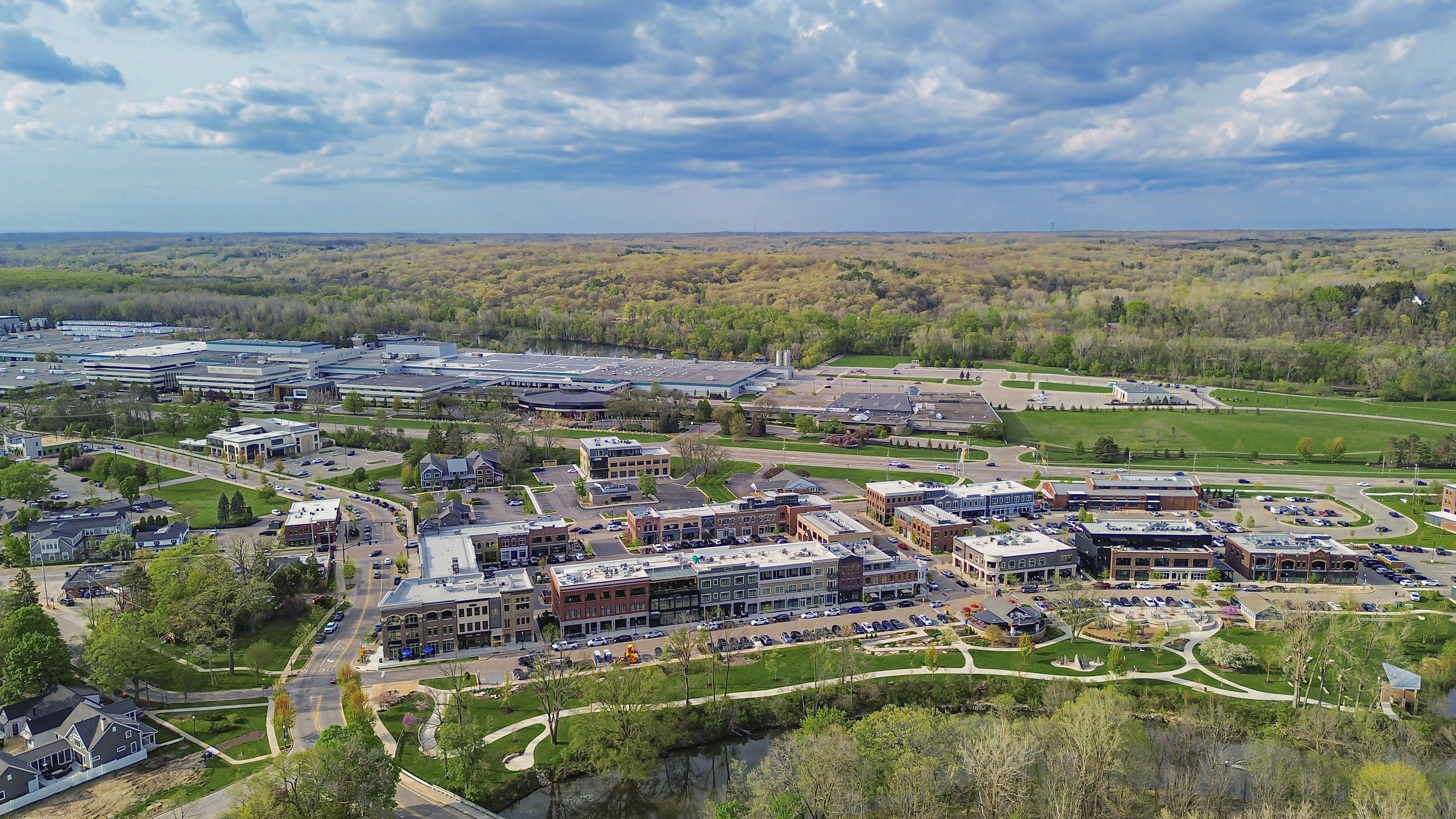
- Unincorporated community of Ada

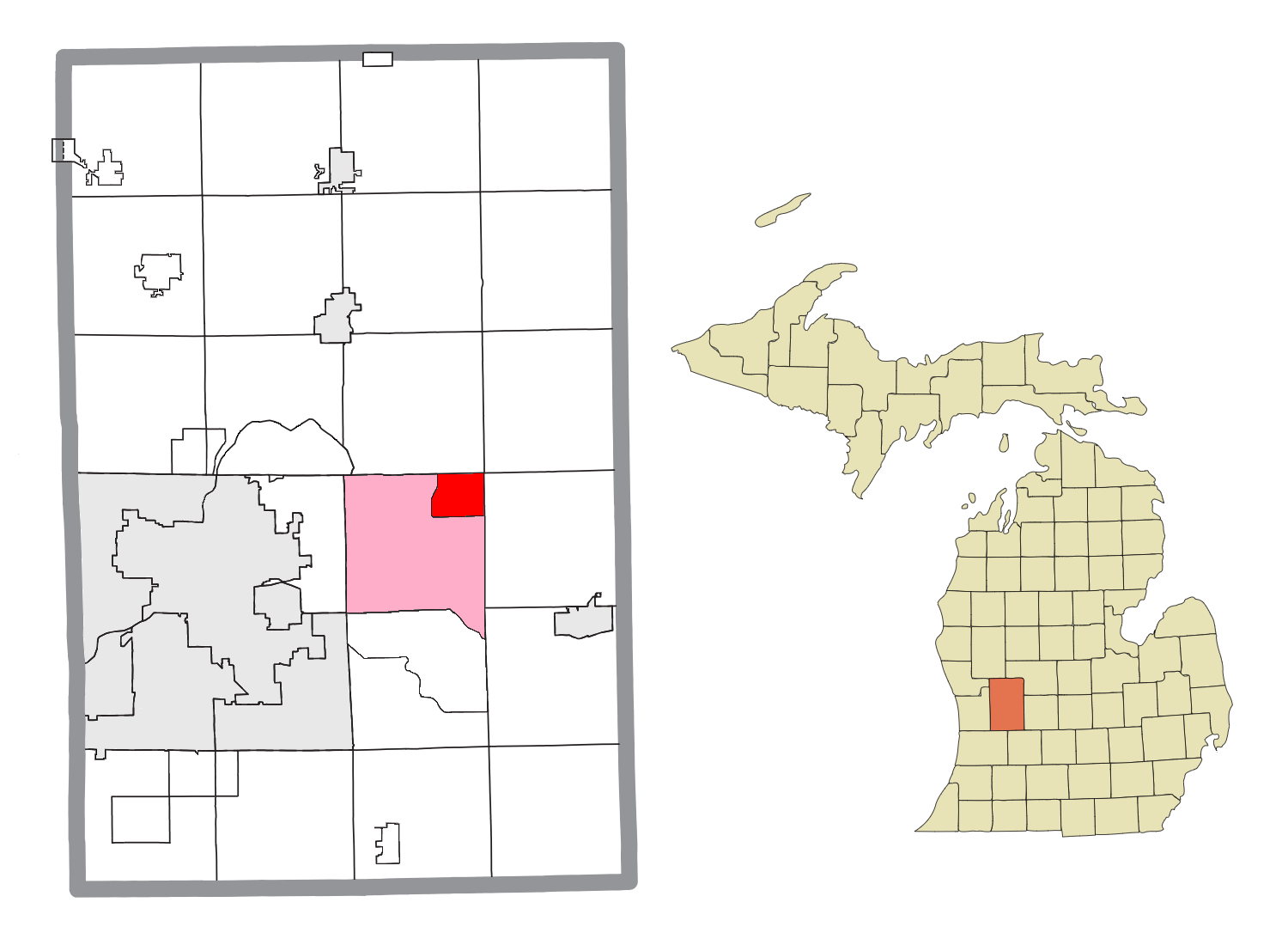
- Location within Kent County (red) and an administered portion of the Forest Hills CDP (pink)

- Location within the state of Michigan Location within the United States
- Coordinates: 42°58′31″N 85°29′30″W
- Country: United States
- State: Michigan
- County: Kent
- Organized: 1838

Government
  - Supervisor: Ross Leisman
  - Clerk: Jacqueline Smith

Area
  - Total: 37.11 sq mi (96.11 km^{2})
  - Land: 36.04 sq mi (93.34 km^{2})
  - Water: 1.06 sq mi (2.75 km^{2})
- Elevation: 758 ft (231 m)

Population (2020)
  - Total: 14,388
  - Density: 399.2/sq mi (154.1/km^{2})
- Time zone: UTC-5 (Eastern (EST))
  - Summer (DST): UTC-4 (EDT)
- ZIP Codes: 49301 (Ada); 49331 (Lowell); 49525 (Grand Rapids); 49546 (Grand Rapids)
- Area code: 616
- FIPS code: 26-081-00240
- GNIS feature ID: 1625798
- Website: Official website

Ada Township (/ˈeɪdə/ AY-də) is a civil township of Kent County in the U.S. state of Michigan. Its population was 14,388 at the 2020 census.

The majority of the township is included in the Forest Hills census-designated place, which is used only for statistical purposes. Ada Township is part of the Grand Rapids metropolitan area and is about 3.0 miles (4.8 km) east of the city of Grand Rapids. The township is the corporate home of Alticor and its subsidiary companies Amway North America and Amway.

== Communities ==
Ada, also known as Ada Village, is an unincorporated community within the township. It is located on M-21, about 12 miles (19 km) east of Grand Rapids. Ada contains its own post office with the 49301 ZIP code that serves the majority of the township. Ada was settled as early as 1821 when Rix Robinson built a trading post near the area to trade furs with a local Ottawa village. Robinson made the first land purchase here in 1833, and a settlement developed along the Thornapple River. A post office was established in 1837. Both the township and village settlement were named for Ada Smith, the daughter of the first postmaster. The settlement was given a station on the Detroit and Milwaukee Railroad (later part of the Detroit, Grand Haven and Milwaukee Railway). A plat was recorded in 1857.

Forest Hills is an unincorporated community and census-designated place (CDP) that occupies the majority of the township for statistical purposes. The CDP occupies 32.99 square miles (85.44 km^{2}) (or 88.90%) of the township. Forest Hills also occupies a large portion of Cascade Township to the south and is the largest and most-populated CDP in the state.

== History ==
At the turn of the 19th century, the land that would become Ada was a village of the Grand River Band of Ottawa, led by Nebawnaygezhick.

During the early colonial settlement of Michigan, Rix Robinson, the first permanent colonial settler of Kent County, married Sebequay ("River Woman"), the sister of Nebawnaygezhick, at Ada. In 1821, Robinson purchased a former French-Canadian trading post at the junction of the Grand and Thornapple Rivers from Madeline La Framboise, on behalf of John Jacob Astor's American Fur Company. Land north of the Grand River was not available for purchase by European-American settlers until after the United States signed the 1836 Treaty of Washington with regional tribes. Following the treaty, Robinson purchased hundreds of acres around the mouth of the Thornapple for the Ottawa to continue living on.

Lucius Lyon, an early settler, first visited Robinson's settlement in 1826. Convinced that the land would become valuable, Lyon purchased large tracts from early settlers. He oversaw development of the land, including the construction of a saw mill. Both Lyon and Robinson are considered the founders of Ada.

Reports conflict concerning when the township was organized. Information provided by the township website indicates that Robinson was elected as the township's first supervisor, but other sources indicate it was organized on April 2, 1838, and that Sydney Smith was elected the first supervisor and that Robinson was the second, elected in 1841 and again in 1844. The village was named after Sydney Smith's daughter, Ada Smith, who was the first non-Native American child born in the village.

The Ada Covered Bridge was constructed across the Thornapple River in 1867. Listed on the National Register of Historic Places, it is one of the few covered bridges that remain standing in the state.

== Geography ==
According to the United States Census Bureau, the township has a total area of 37.11 square miles (96.11 km^{2}), of which 1.06 sq mi (2.75 km^{2}) (2.86%) is covered by water. The Grand and the Thornapple Rivers pass through the township.

=== Major highways ===
- M-21 (Fulton Street) runs west–east through the southern portion of the township.

== Demographics ==
=== 2020 census ===
As of the 2020 United States census, the township had a population of 14,388 people. The racial makeup was 86.3% non-Hispanic White, 0.3% Black or African American, 4.6% Asian, 0.1% Native American, and 5.9% from two or more races. Hispanic or Latino people of any race were 5.0% of the population.

=== 2000 census ===
As of the 2000 census, 9,882 people, 3,263 households, and 2,802 families resided in the township. The population density was 273.9 inhabitants per square mile (105.8/km^{2}). The 3,384 housing units had an average density of 93.8 per square mile (36.2/km^{2}). The racial makeup of the township was 95.57% White, 0.47% African American, 0.16% Native American, 2.35% Asian, 0.01% Pacific Islander, 0.51% from other races, and 0.94% from two or more races. Hispanics or Latinos of any race were 1.07% of the population.

Of the 3,263 households, 47.1% had children under 18 living with them, 78.7% were married couples living together, 5.4% had a female householder with no husband present, and 14.1% were not families. About 11.6% of all households were made up of individuals, and 3.7% had someone living alone who was 65 or older. The average household size was 3.03 and the average family size was 3.30.

In the township, the age distribution was 32.6% under 18, 5.4% from 18 to 24, 27.6% from 25 to 44, 27.3% from 45 to 64, and 7.1% who were 65 or older. The median age was 37 years. For every 100 females, there were 99.8 males. For every 100 females 18 and over, there were 97.1 males.

The median income for a household in the township was $83,357 and for a family was $87,972. Males had a median income of $61,795 versus $36,288 for females. The per capita income for the township was $37,840. About 1.1% of families and 1.9% of the population were below the poverty line, including 1.6% of those under 18 and 2.8% of those 65 or over.

== Education ==
The Forest Hills Public Schools district serves most of the township, while Lowell Area Schools serve a smaller portion in the northeastern section.

Forest Hills Central High School and Forest Hills Eastern High School are located in Ada Township. The Grand Rapids Supplemental School is a part-time Japanese school (hoshū jugyō kō) that holds its classes at Forest Hills Central High School.

== Notable people ==
- Kreigh Collins (1908–1974) – cartoonist
- Dick DeVos (born 1955) – businessman
- Helen DeVos (1927–2017) – businesswoman
- Richard DeVos (1926–2018) – co-founder of Amway and owner of the Orlando Magic
- Kevin Grady (born 1986) – college football player
- Adam Grinwis (born 1992) – professional soccer player
- Lauren Kozal (born 2000) – professional soccer player
- Kirk O'Bee (born 1977) – professional road racing cyclist
- Steve Pestka (born 1951) – politician
- Rix Robinson (1789–1875) – first settler of Kent County, pioneer, fur trader, and politician
- Jay Van Andel (1924–2004) – co-founder of Amway
- Barton H. Watson (1960–2004) – founder of CyberNET Engineering and mail fraudster
- Kathleen Weathers – president of the Ecological Society of America and ecologist

== Images ==
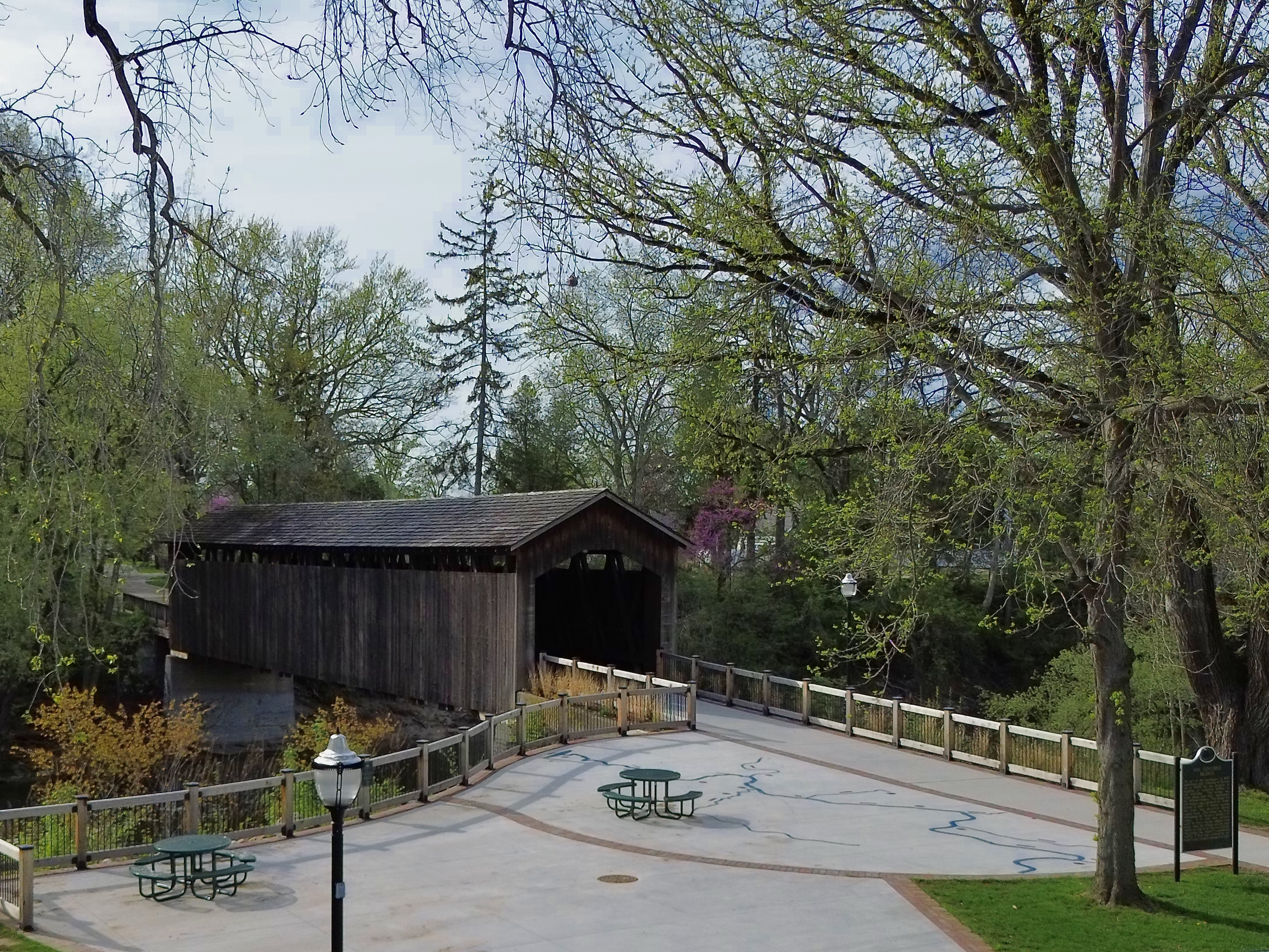
Ada Covered Bridge

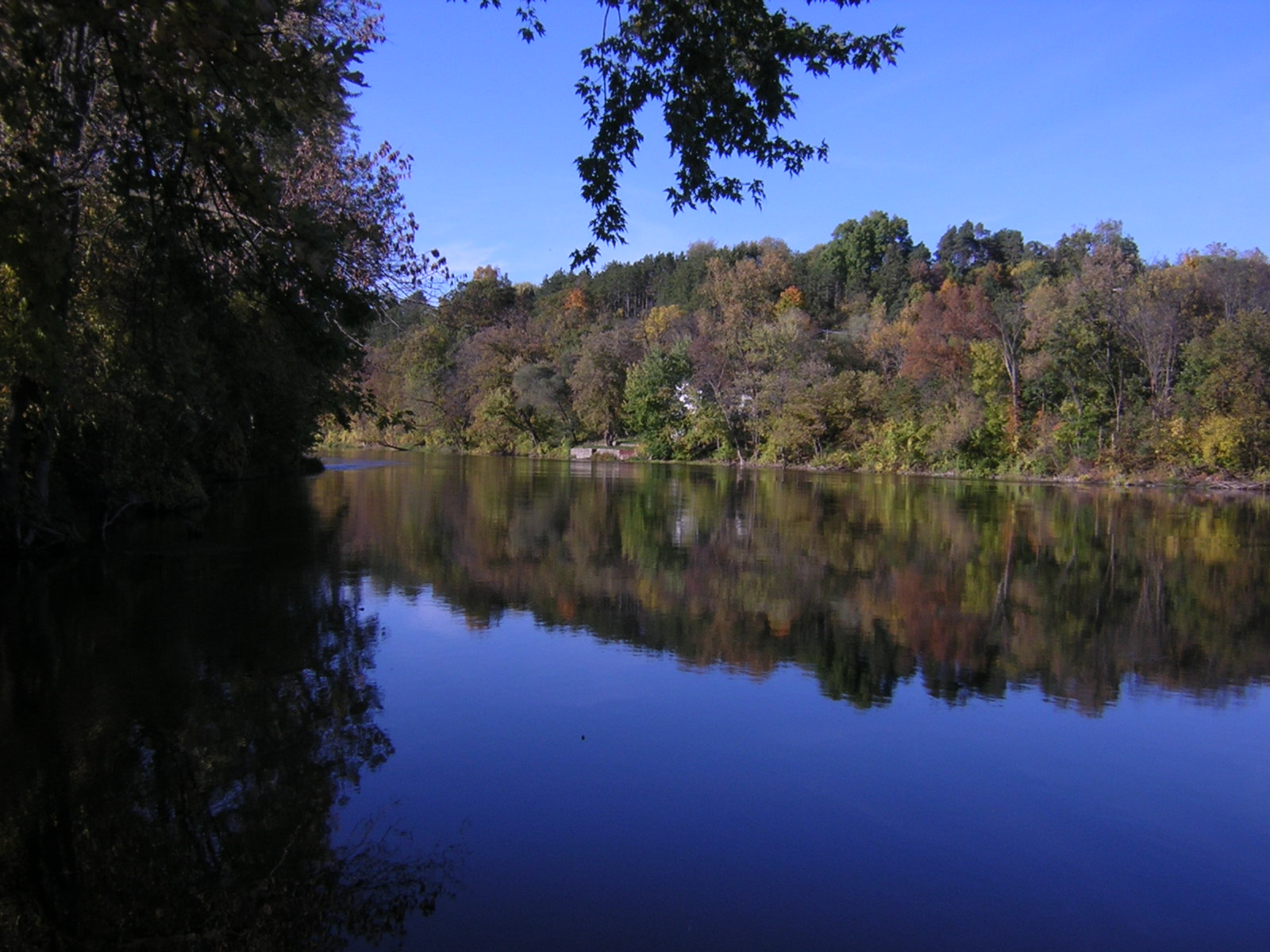
Grand River passing through the township

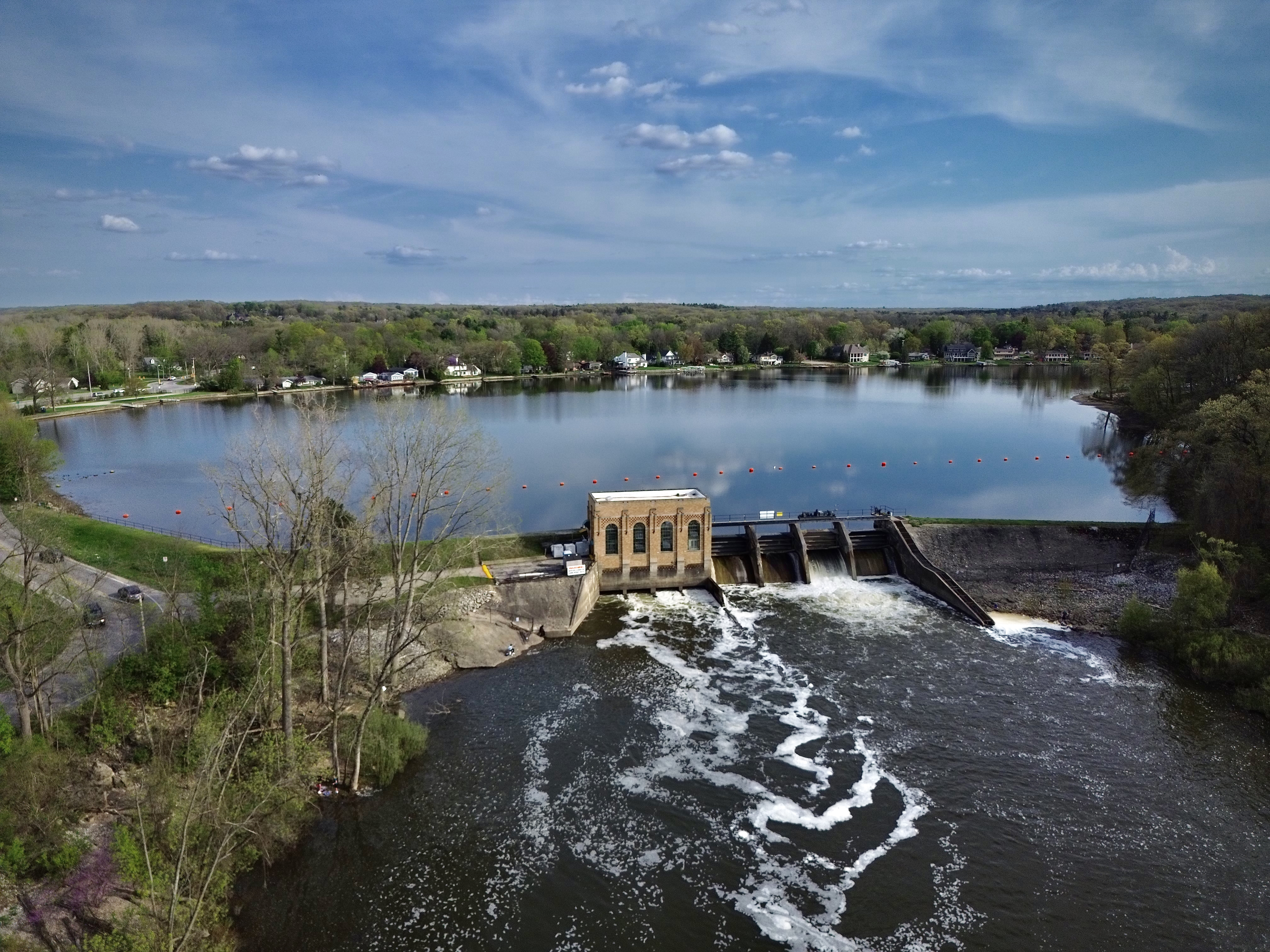
Dam along the Thornapple River
