= Kyle Visser =

American basketball player

Personal information
- Born: October 19, 1985 (age 41) Grand Rapids, Michigan, U.S.
- Listed height: 6 ft 11 in (2.11 m)
- Listed weight: 255 lb (116 kg)

Career information
- High school: Forest Hills Central (Grand Rapids, Michigan)
- College: Wake Forest (2003–2007)
- NBA draft: 2007: undrafted
- Playing career: 2007–2015
- Position: Center

Career history
- 2007–2009: Phantoms Braunschweig
- 2009–2010: Ludwigsburg
- 2010–2012: Phantoms Braunschweig
- 2013: Radnički Kragujevac
- 2013–2015: Phantoms / Löwen Braunschweig

Career highlights
- Third-team All-ACC (2007)

Kyle Lee Visser (born October 19, 1985) is an American former professional basketball player.

== Biography ==
Visser graduated from Forest Hills Central High School in 2003 and played for the Wake Forest Demon Deacons from 2003–04 to 2006–07. He was considered by ESPN to be the nation's most improved college basketball player after having scored 466 points during his senior season, which was more than his previous three seasons combined.

Visser ranked seventh in the ACC in scoring at 17.3 ppg, and ranked second in the league in field goal shooting percentage (.593). He was the only player in the entire conference to rank in the top ten in scoring, rebounding, field goal percentage, and blocks. On November 11, 2006, he set a school record for field goal percentage in a single game (1.000) by shooting a perfect 10-for-10 against James Madison University. Visser also ranks seventh in school history with 113 career blocks. In his senior season, he scored 20 points nine times to go along with six double-doubles.

Visser signed a nine-month contract with a German professional basketball team, the New Yorker Phantoms in October 2007. On July 25, 2013, he returned to Phantoms Braunschweig signing two year–deal.

== Retirement ==
On October 1, 2015, Visser officially retired from professional basketball and decided to continue working as a Real Estate agent. He is also continuing to work with kids on their basketball games during his camps and by organizing workouts.
