= Mitch Lyons =

American football player (born 1970)

No. 86, 85
- Position: Tight end

Personal information
- Born: May 13, 1970 (age 56); Grand Rapids, Michigan, U.S.
- Listed height: 6 ft 5 in (1.96 m)
- Listed weight: 268 lb (122 kg)

Career information
- High school: Forest Hills Northern (Grand Rapids)
- College: Michigan State
- NFL draft: 1993: 6th round, 151st overall pick

Career history
- Atlanta Falcons (1993–1996); Pittsburgh Steelers (1997–1999)

Awards and highlights
- Second-team All-Big Ten (1992)

Career NFL statistics
- Receptions: 39
- Receiving yards: 345
- Touchdowns: 1
- Stats at Pro Football Reference

Mitchell Warren Lyons (born May 13, 1970) is an American former professional football player who was a tight end in the National Football League (NFL). He attended Forest Hills Northern High School in Grand Rapids, Michigan and played college football for the Michigan State Spartans.

Pre-draft measurables
Height	Weight	Arm length	Hand span	40-yard dash	10-yard split	20-yard split	20-yard shuttle	Vertical jump	Broad jump	Bench press
6 ft 4 1/4 in (1.94 m)	251 lb (114 kg)	31 3/8 in (0.80 m)	10 5/8 in (0.27 m)	5.25 s	1.77 s	2.99 s	4.56 s	26.0 in (0.66 m)	8 ft 7 in (2.62 m)	20 reps

At 6'5" tall and 265 pounds, the Atlanta Falcons drafted him in 1993 in the sixth round. He played 4 seasons with the Falcons and was then traded to the Pittsburgh Steelers, where he played 3 seasons. His career statistics include 39 receptions for 345 yards and one touchdown.

Lyons was elected to the Michigan State University Board of Trustees for an eight-year term that began on January 1, 2011.
