= Kent County, Michigan =

County in Michigan, United States

- County
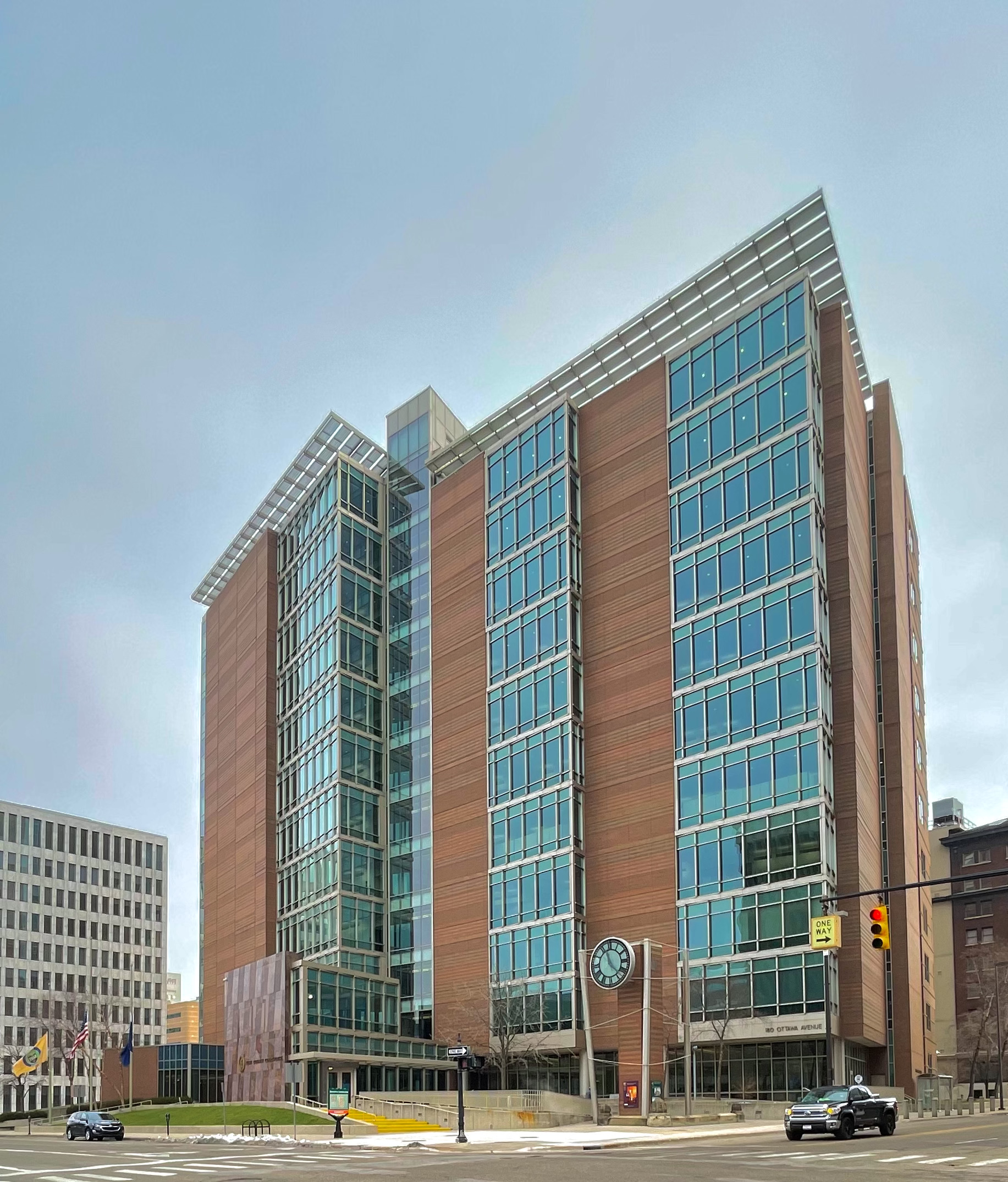
- Kent County Courthouse

- Flag Seal

- Location within the U.S. state of Michigan
- Coordinates: 43°02′N 85°33′W
- Country: United States
- State: Michigan
- Founded: March 2, 1831 (created); 1836 (organized)
- Named for: James Kent
- Seat: Grand Rapids
- Largest city: Grand Rapids

Area
  - Total: 872 sq mi (2,260 km^{2})
  - Land: 847 sq mi (2,190 km^{2})
  - Water: 25 sq mi (65 km^{2}) 2.9%

Population (2020)
  - Total: 657,974
  - Estimate (2025): 675,232 ▲
  - Density: 766/sq mi (296/km^{2})
- Time zone: UTC−5 (Eastern)
  - Summer (DST): UTC−4 (EDT)
- Congressional districts: 2nd, 3rd
- Website: https://www.kentcountymi.gov/

Kent County is located in the U.S. state of Michigan. As of the 2020 Census, the county had a population of 657,974, making it the fourth most populous county in Michigan, and the largest outside of the Detroit area. Its county seat and largest city is Grand Rapids, Michigan’s second largest city. The county was set off in 1831, and organized in 1836. It is named for New York jurist and legal scholar James Kent, who represented the Michigan Territory in its dispute with Ohio over the Toledo Strip.

Kent County is part of the Grand Rapids metropolitan area and is West Michigan's economic and manufacturing center. It is home of the Frederik Meijer Gardens, a significant cultural landmark of the Midwest. The Gerald R. Ford International Airport is the county's primary location for regional and international airline traffic.

== History ==
The Grand River runs through the county. On its west bank are burial mounds, remnants of the Hopewell Indians who lived there. In the 18th century the Odawa migrated to this area and established multiple villages along the Grand River valley. By the 19th century there were estimated to be over 1000 Odawa. The fur trade became an important industry in the valley during the early 19th century. After the War of 1812, Rix Robinson and Louis Campau were the earliest traders in the area. In 1826, Campau established a trading post in Grand Rapids. In 1831, he bought land and platted the town. Campau is considered the town's "father". One year later, government surveyor Lucius Lyon purchased land north of Campau's property. Campau surveyed and platted the village following Native American trails and Lyon had platted his property in an English grid format, which meant there were two adjoining villages, with different platting formats. Campau later merged the villages under the name of Grand Rapids.

In 1831, it was set off from Kalamazoo County. In 1838, Grand Rapids was incorporated as the county's first village. By the end of the century, stimulated by the construction of several sawmills, the area was a significant center for agriculture, logging, and manufacturing furniture.

== Geography ==
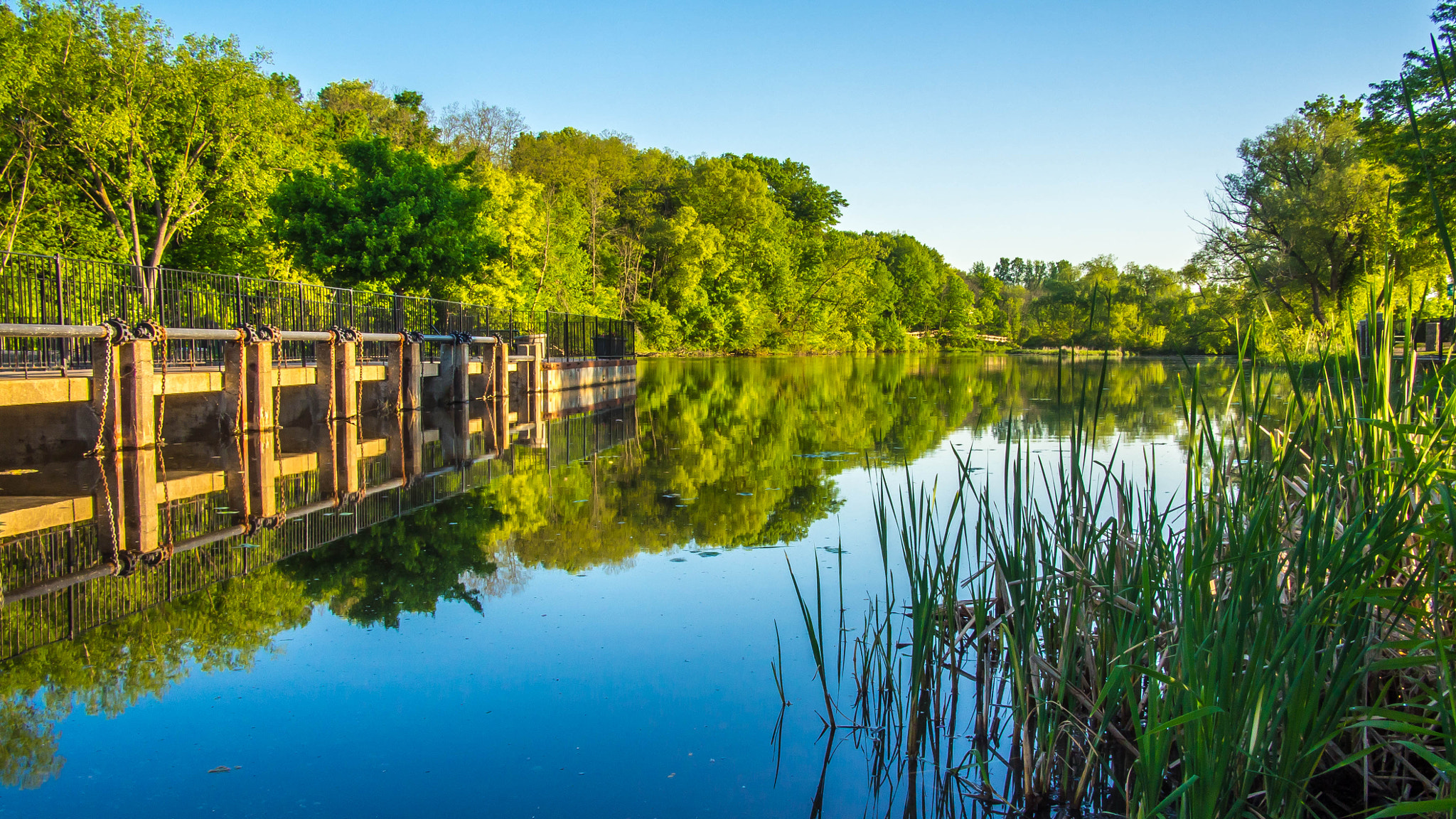
Rockford Dam in Rockford, Michigan

According to the U.S. Census Bureau, the county has an area of 872 square miles (2,260 km^{2}), of which 847 square miles (2,190 km^{2}) is land and 25 square miles (65 km^{2}) (2.9%) is water. Kent County's highest point is Fisk Knob Park, in Solon Township, at 1048 feet.

=== Rivers ===
- Grand River, flows through the county from its eastern border to the west, and after passing through Ottawa County, empties into Lake Michigan at Grand Haven. It has three tributaries in Kent County, listed in order of convergence:
- Flat River, enters the county from the east, and joins the Grand from the north, in Lowell.
- Thornapple River, enters the county from the south, and joins the Grand in Ada.
- Rogue River, enters the county from the north, and joins the Grand in Belmont.

=== Trails ===
These hiking and biking trails run through the county:

- North Country Trail, runs north–south the length of the county, passing through Cedar Springs, Grattan and Lowell. Lowell is the trail's half-way point, and the national headquarters of the North Country Trail Association is located here.
- Thornapple Trail, begins in Kentwood and runs southeast through Dutton and Caledonia.
- White Pine Trail begins in Comstock Park and runs northeast through Belmont, Rockford, Cedar Springs, and Sand Lake.
- Kent Trails (which is singular in spite of the 's') runs north–south from John Ball Park in Grand Rapids to 84th Street in Byron Township, with an extension that runs east/west along 76th Street and north–south from 76th Street to Douglas Walker Park on 84th street.
- The Frederik Meijer Trail, which, as of November 2008, was incomplete, runs east/west mostly along the M-6 freeway and will connect the Kent Trails and the Thornapple Trail when completed.
- Cannon Township Trail runs through Cannon Township in the eastern part of the county from Cannon Township Center on M-44. It runs along M-44 then south near Sunfish Lake Road, turning east through the Cannonsburg Cemetery, and ends at Warren Townsend Park near Cannonsburg.

=== Adjacent counties ===
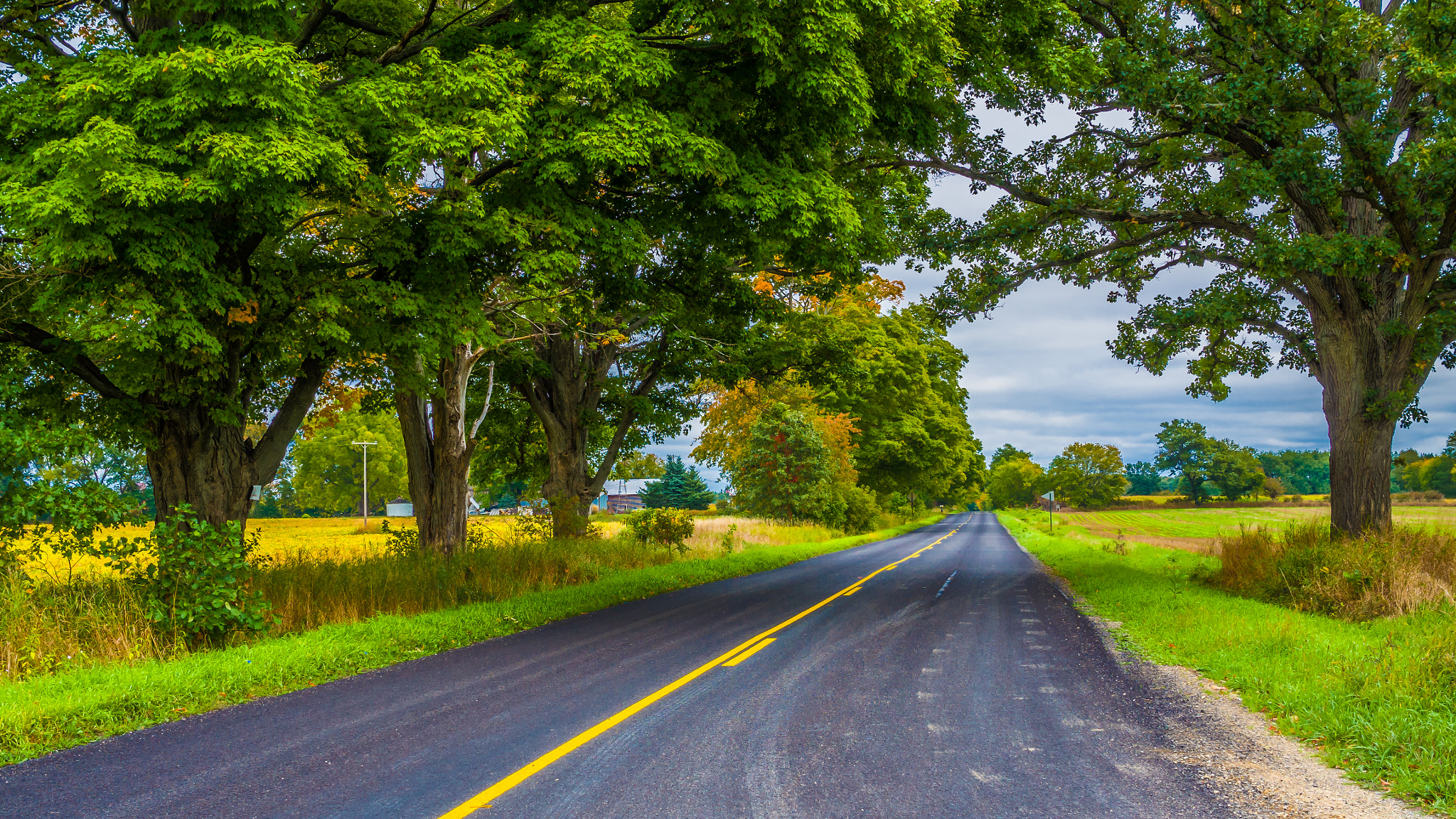
13 Mile Road in the rural Courtland Township

- Newaygo County - north
- Montcalm County - northeast
- Muskegon County - northwest
- Ionia County - east
- Ottawa County - west
- Allegan County - southwest
- Barry County - southeast

== Demographics ==
Historical population
Census	Pop.	Note	%±
1840	2,587		—
1850	12,016		364.5%
1860	30,716		155.6%
1870	50,403		64.1%
1880	73,253		45.3%
1890	109,922		50.1%
1900	129,714		18.0%
1910	159,145		22.7%
1920	183,041		15.0%
1930	240,511		31.4%
1940	246,338		2.4%
1950	288,292		17.0%
1960	363,187		26.0%
1970	411,044		13.2%
1980	444,506		8.1%
1990	500,631		12.6%
2000	574,335		14.7%
2010	602,622		4.9%
2020	657,974		9.2%
2025 (est.)	675,232	▲	2.6%
U.S. Decennial Census; 1790–1960 1900–1990; 1990–2000 2010–2019

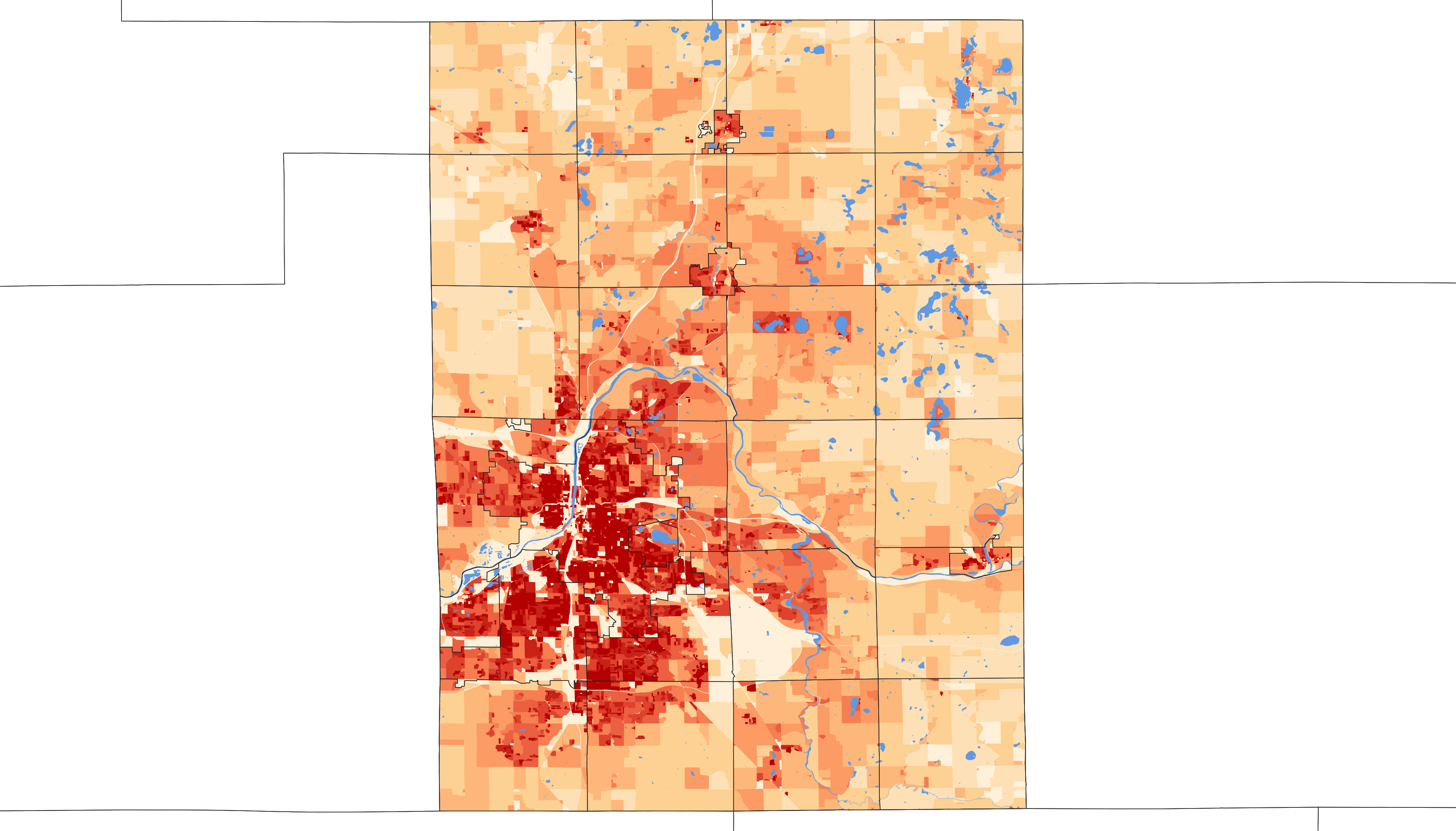
2020 population density of Kent County MI by census block

=== Racial and ethnic composition ===
Kent County, Michigan – Racial and ethnic composition Note: the US Census treats Hispanic/Latino as an ethnic category. This table excludes Latinos from the racial categories and assigns them to a separate category. Hispanics/Latinos may be of any race.
Race / Ethnicity (NH = Non-Hispanic)	Pop 1980	Pop 1990	Pop 2000	Pop 2010	Pop 2020	% 1980	% 1990	% 2000	% 2010	% 2020
White alone (NH)	399,372	438,294	461,162	457,769	465,491	89.85%	87.55%	80.29%	75.96%	70.75%
Black or African American alone (NH)	31,068	39,432	49,994	56,372	62,359	6.99%	7.88%	8.70%	9.35%	9.48%
Native American or Alaska Native alone (NH)	2,059	2,493	2,528	2,075	1,818	0.46%	0.50%	0.44%	0.34%	0.28%
Asian alone (NH)	2,382	5,234	10,577	13,932	21,799	0.54%	1.05%	1.84%	2.31%	3.31%
Native Hawaiian or Pacific Islander alone (NH)	x	x	214	163	175	x	x	0.04%	0.03%	0.03%
Other race alone (NH)	884	494	702	747	2,331	0.20%	0.10%	0.12%	0.12%	0.35%
Mixed race or Multiracial (NH)	x	x	8,975	13,127	28,773	x	x	1.56%	2.18%	4.37%
Hispanic or Latino (any race)	8,741	14,684	40,183	58,437	75,228	1.97%	2.93%	7.00%	9.70%	11.43%
Total	444,506	500,631	574,335	602,622	657,974	100.00%	100.00%	100.00%	100.00%	100.00%

=== 2020 census ===
As of the 2020 census, the county had a population of 657,974. The median age was 35.5 years. 23.7% of residents were under the age of 18 and 14.4% of residents were 65 years of age or older. For every 100 females there were 96.5 males, and for every 100 females age 18 and over there were 94.0 males age 18 and over.

The racial makeup of the county was 73.0% White, 9.8% Black or African American, 0.6% American Indian and Alaska Native, 3.3% Asian, <0.1% Native Hawaiian and Pacific Islander, 5.7% from some other race, and 7.6% from two or more races. Hispanic or Latino residents of any race comprised 11.4% of the population.

83.8% of residents lived in urban areas, while 16.2% lived in rural areas.

There were 251,658 households in the county, of which 31.0% had children under the age of 18 living in them. Of all households, 48.1% were married-couple households, 17.8% were households with a male householder and no spouse or partner present, and 26.7% were households with a female householder and no spouse or partner present. About 26.6% of all households were made up of individuals and 9.8% had someone living alone who was 65 years of age or older.

There were 265,002 housing units, of which 5.0% were vacant. Among occupied housing units, 68.6% were owner-occupied and 31.4% were renter-occupied. The homeowner vacancy rate was 0.9% and the rental vacancy rate was 6.0%.

=== 2010 census ===
As of the 2010 United States census, there were 602,622 people living in the county. 76.1% were non-Hispanic White, 10.2% Black or African American, 2.4% Asian, 0.7% Native American, 4.5% of some other race and 2.6% of two or more races. 9.7% were Hispanic or Latino (of any race).

19.6% reported being of Dutch ancestry; 14.9% German, 13.1% English, 7.4% Irish, 7.1% Polish and 5.5% American ancestry according to the 2010 American Community Survey. 90.0% spoke only English at home, while 6.0% spoke Spanish.

=== 2000 census ===
As of the 2000 United States census, there were 574,335 people, 212,890 households, and 144,126 families living in the county. The current estimated population is 604,323. The population density was 671 inhabitants per square mile (259/km^{2}). There were 224,000 housing units at an average density of 262 per square mile (101/km^{2}). The racial makeup of the county was 83.13% White, 8.93% Black or African American, 0.52% Native American, 1.86% Asian, 0.06% Pacific Islander, 3.34% from other races, and 2.16% from two or more races. 7.00% of the population were Hispanic or Latino of any race.

There were 212,890 households, out of which 35.80% had children under the age of 18 living with them, 52.30% were married couples living together, 11.60% had a female householder with no husband present, and 32.30% were non-families. 25.60% of all households were made up of individuals, and 8.00% had someone living alone who was 65 years of age or older. The average household size was 2.64 and the average family size was 3.20.

The age distribution of the county was as follows: 28.30% were under the age of 18, 10.50% from 18 to 24, 31.20% from 25 to 44, 19.70% from 45 to 64, and 10.40% who were 65 years of age or older. The median age was 32 years. For every 100 females, there were 96.90 males. For every 100 females age 18 and over, there were 93.70 males.

The median income for a household in the county was $45,980, and the median income for a family was $54,770. Males had a median income of $39,878 versus $27,364 for females. The per capita income for the county was $21,629. 8.90% of the population and 6.30% of families were below the poverty line. 10.20% of the population under the age of 18 and 7.50% of those 65 or older were living in poverty.

== Transportation ==
=== Air service ===
Commercial air service to Grand Rapids is provided by Gerald R. Ford International Airport (GRR). Previously named Kent County International Airport, it holds Grand Rapids' mark in modern history with the United States' first regularly scheduled airline service, beginning July 31, 1926, between Grand Rapids and Detroit at the former location.

=== Bus service ===
Public bus transportation is provided by The Rapid, which serves 9 municipalities in Kent County. The Rapid operates 23 routes, including the Silver Line, Laker Line, and DASH (Downtown Area Shuttle) services.

=== Railroad ===
Amtrak provides direct train service to Chicago from the passenger station via the Pere Marquette line. Freight service is provided by CSX Transportation, and by local short-line railroads, the Grand Rapids Eastern Railroad, Grand Elk Railroad, Marquette Rail and the Coopersville & Marne. GR and MQT operate under the ownership of Genesee and Wyoming while GDLK is operated by Watco Companies. CPMY is independent, and focuses more on their excursion service between their namesake cities in Ottawa County than on their small freight business in Kent.

=== Highways ===
- I-96
- I-196 (Gerald R. Ford Freeway)
- I-296 (concurrent with US 131)
- US 131
- M-6 (Paul B. Henry Freeway, South Beltline Freeway)
- M-11
- M-21
- M-37
- M-44
- M-45 (Lake Michigan Drive)
- M-46
- M-50
- M-57
- M-121

== Economy ==
These corporations are headquartered in Kent County, in the following communities:

- Acrisure, Grand Rapids
- Amway, Ada
- American Seating, Grand Rapids
- Bissell Homecare, Walker
- Buell Motorcycle Company, Cascade Township
- Gill Industries, Grand Rapids
- Gilson Graphics, Grand Rapids
- Gordon Food Service, Wyoming
- Founders Brewing Company, Grand Rapids
- Hart & Cooley, Grand Rapids
- Meijer, Walker
- Old Orchard, Sparta
- Perrigo, Grand Rapids
- Pridgeon & Clay, Grand Rapids
- Spartan Stores, Byron Township
- Steelcase, Grand Rapids
- Universal Forest Products, Grand Rapids Township
- Wolverine Worldwide, Rockford
- X-Rite, Kentwood
- Zondervan, Cascade Township

== Government ==
The county government operates the jail, maintains rural roads, operates the major local courts, keeps files of deeds and mortgages, maintains vital records, administers public health regulations, and participates with the state in the provision of welfare and other social services. The county board of commissioners controls the budget but has only limited authority to make laws or ordinances. In Michigan, most local government functions—police and fire, building and zoning, tax assessment, street maintenance, etc.—are the responsibility of individual cities and townships.

=== Elected officials ===
- Prosecuting Attorney: Chris Becker (Republican)
- Sheriff: Michelle LaJoye-Young (Republican)
- County Clerk/Register of Deeds: Lisa Posthumus Lyons (Republican)
- County Treasurer: Peter MacGregor (Republican)
- Drain Commissioner: Ken Yonker (Republican)
- County Commission or Board of Commissioners: 21 members, elected from districts (12 Republicans, 9 Democrats), Ben Greene (Republican) serves as board chair.
- Circuit Court: 10 judges (non-partisan)
- Probate Court: 3 judges (non-partisan)

(information as of 2022 election)

In 1996, Kent County prosecutors were responsible for charging James King, a College student who was beaten by police. James King was acquitted of all charges.

== Politics ==
United States presidential election results for Kent County, Michigan
Year	Republican		Democratic		Third party(ies)	
Year	No.	%	No.	%	No.	%
1880	8,313	50.26%	5,115	30.92%	3,113	18.82%
1884	9,007	45.74%	9,639	48.95%	1,045	5.31%
1888	12,811	49.41%	11,864	45.76%	1,254	4.84%
1892	12,388	46.31%	11,533	43.11%	2,829	10.58%
1896	17,053	54.34%	13,582	43.28%	749	2.39%
1900	17,861	54.79%	13,775	42.26%	962	2.95%
1904	20,254	71.63%	6,430	22.74%	1,593	5.63%
1908	16,576	55.44%	11,445	38.28%	1,880	6.29%
1912	6,498	20.35%	9,412	29.48%	16,016	50.17%
1916	16,095	42.46%	20,364	53.73%	1,444	3.81%
1920	40,802	70.14%	14,763	25.38%	2,610	4.49%
1924	45,207	76.61%	7,982	13.53%	5,819	9.86%
1928	56,573	75.12%	18,229	24.21%	508	0.67%
1932	42,186	48.64%	41,601	47.97%	2,936	3.39%
1936	36,633	42.94%	44,823	52.55%	3,848	4.51%
1940	53,131	52.05%	48,196	47.22%	749	0.73%
1944	54,163	54.65%	43,679	44.07%	1,274	1.29%
1948	53,669	54.33%	43,205	43.74%	1,902	1.93%
1952	79,647	62.07%	47,221	36.80%	1,447	1.13%
1956	94,969	65.73%	48,871	33.82%	642	0.44%
1960	95,477	60.70%	61,313	38.98%	506	0.32%
1964	66,830	43.41%	86,860	56.42%	269	0.17%
1968	85,810	53.68%	61,891	38.72%	12,149	7.60%
1972	104,041	59.30%	67,587	38.52%	3,833	2.18%
1976	126,805	67.22%	59,000	31.28%	2,828	1.50%
1980	112,604	54.59%	72,790	35.29%	20,896	10.13%
1984	137,417	67.03%	66,238	32.31%	1,365	0.67%
1988	131,910	63.77%	73,467	35.52%	1,465	0.71%
1992	115,285	47.53%	82,305	33.93%	44,963	18.54%
1996	121,335	54.32%	85,912	38.46%	16,132	7.22%
2000	148,602	59.37%	95,442	38.13%	6,274	2.51%
2004	171,201	58.85%	116,909	40.19%	2,781	0.96%
2008	148,336	48.83%	149,909	49.34%	5,554	1.83%
2012	155,925	53.00%	133,408	45.35%	4,873	1.66%
2016	148,180	47.66%	138,683	44.61%	24,031	7.73%
2020	165,741	45.78%	187,915	51.91%	8,375	2.31%
2024	172,720	46.44%	192,668	51.80%	6,559	1.76%

United States Senate election results for Kent County, Michigan1
Year	Republican		Democratic		Third party(ies)	
Year	No.	%	No.	%	No.	%
2024	170,388	46.28%	187,509	50.93%	10,261	2.79%

Michigan Gubernatorial election results for Kent County
Year	Republican		Democratic		Third party(ies)	
Year	No.	%	No.	%	No.	%
2022	132,172	44.08%	162,899	54.32%	4,801	1.60%

Historically, Kent County, like West Michigan as a whole, was a stronghold for the Republican Party. For most of the 20th century, it was rather conservative for an urban county. The GOP only lost the county in four presidential elections from 1888 to 2004, two of which saw the Democratic Party win over 400 electoral votes nationwide. However, the Democrats have received increased support since the 2000s, with Grand Rapids and nearby suburbs supporting the Democratic Party while the outer suburbs and rural areas support the Republican Party. Since the 1990s, Grand Rapids has also normally sent Democrats to the state legislature.

In 2008, Democratic presidential candidate Barack Obama narrowly carried the county, receiving 49.34% of its votes to Republican John McCain's 48.83%. It was the first time the county had supported a Democrat for president since 1964, and only the fourth time since 1884. By comparison, George W. Bush had taken almost 59 percent of the county's vote in 2004.

In 2012, the county returned to the Republican camp as Mitt Romney won 53.0% of the vote to Obama's 45.35%. Four years later, Republican Donald Trump won the county with 47.66% of the vote, to 44.61% for his Democratic rival, Hillary Clinton, while Gary Johnson of the Libertarian Party received 4.58%.

In 2020, Joe Biden received nearly 52% of the votes in the county, the largest vote share for a Democratic candidate since Lyndon Johnson in 1964. By comparison, Obama only won the county by 1,573 votes in 2008, for 49.7 percent of the vote.

Kent County is one of only thirteen counties in the United States to have voted for Obama in 2008, Romney in 2012, Trump in 2016, and Biden in 2020. (Note: The other twelve are Butte County, California; Teton County, Idaho; Kendall County, Illinois; Kent County, Maryland; McLean County, Illinois; Tippecanoe County, Indiana; Leelanau County, Michigan; Carroll County, New Hampshire; Rockingham County, New Hampshire; Marion County, Oregon; Grand County, Utah; and Albany County, Wyoming.)

In 2024, Kamala Harris became the first Democrat to carry Kent County while losing the presidential election. Harris also won the county despite losing Michigan in 2024, the first time it voted for a Democratic nominee who lost statewide since 1916, potentially indicating a leftward shift in the county.

The county is considered a bellwether politically. In 2018, Gretchen Whitmer, herself a Kent County native, became the first Democratic governor to win the county after James Blanchard's 1986 landslide re-election. Also during the same cycle, incumbent Democratic Senator Debbie Stabenow narrowly carried the county by 0.3 points, only the second time (following Carl Levin in 2008) since Donald Riegle in 1982 the county supported a Democrat for Senate.

In the House of Representatives, the bulk of the county has been located in Michigan's 3rd congressional district since the 1993 redistricting cycle. That district had previously been the 5th congressional district from 1873 to 1993. The current Representative for the district is Democrat Hillary Scholten. Until Scholten took office in 2023, the city had been represented by a Republican for all but 35 months since 1913. The only Democrat to represent the city in this time was Richard Vander Veen, first elected in a 1974 special election following the district's long-time Representative Gerald Ford's ascension to Vice President. Vander Veen was ousted by Republican Harold S. Sawyer in 1976, and the GOP held the seat without interruption until Scholten's win in 2022. Further underlining how Republican the county has historically been, the Democrats representing Grand Rapids-based districts in the state legislature were typically the only elected Democrats above the county level until 2023.

A sliver of northern and eastern Kent County, including Cedar Springs and Lowell, is in the 2nd congressional district, represented by Republican John Moolenaar.

== Communities ==
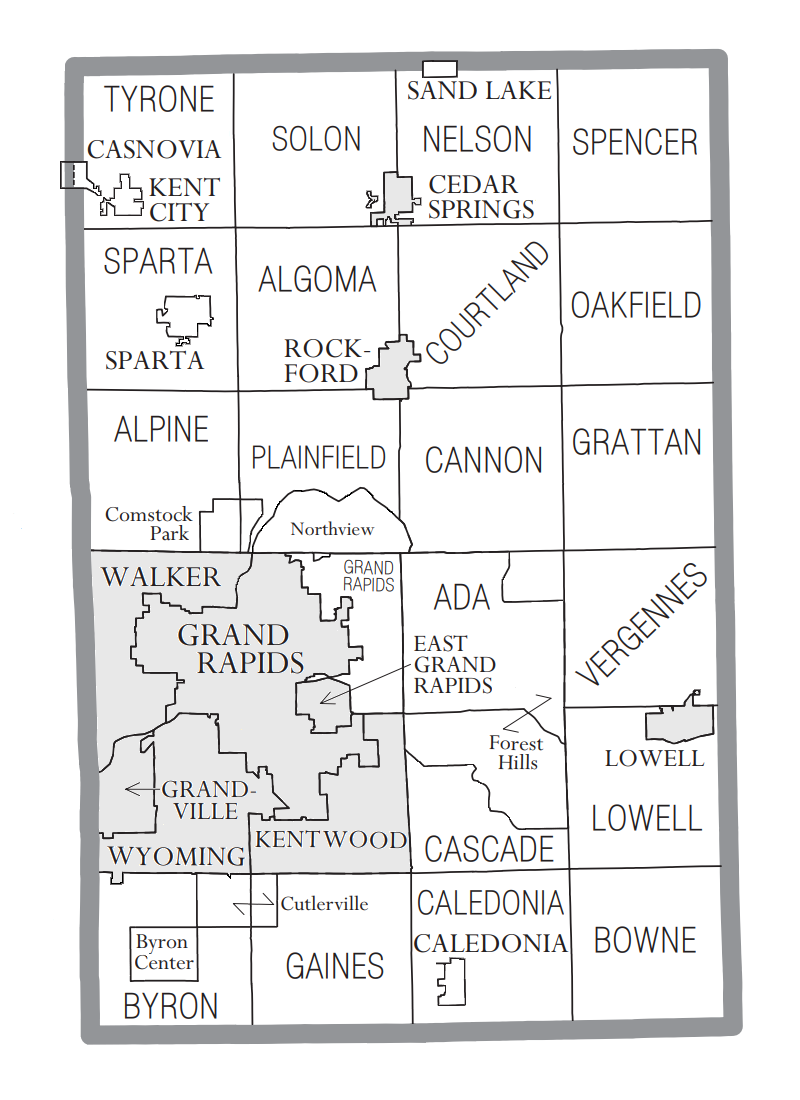
U.S. census data map showing local municipal boundaries within Kent County, as well as CDP boundaries. Shaded areas represent incorporated cities.

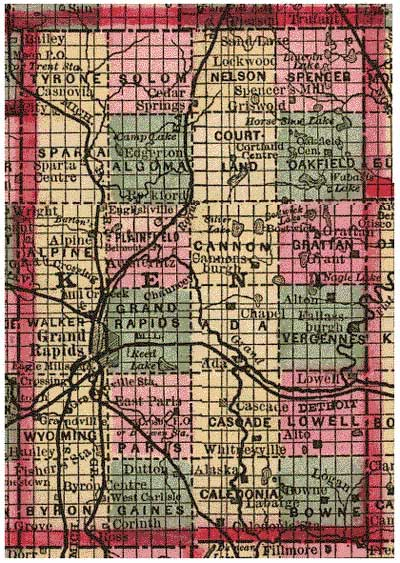
A Public Land Survey System survey of Kent County in 1885, showing 24 named townships and sectional subdivisions

=== Cities ===
- Cedar Springs
- East Grand Rapids
- Grand Rapids (county seat)
- Grandville
- Kentwood
- Lowell
- Rockford
- Walker
- Wyoming

=== Villages ===
- Caledonia
- Casnovia (partial)
- Kent City
- Sand Lake
- Sparta

=== Charter townships ===
- Caledonia Charter Township
- Cascade Charter Township
- Gaines Charter Township
- Grand Rapids Charter Township
- Lowell Charter Township
- Plainfield Charter Township

=== Civil townships ===
- Ada Township
- Algoma Township
- Alpine Township
- Bowne Township
- Byron Township
- Cannon Township
- Courtland Township
- Grattan Township
- Nelson Township
- Oakfield Township
- Paris Township (defunct; partitioned between Wyoming, Grand Rapids and Kentwood)
- Solon Township
- Sparta Township
- Spencer Township
- Tyrone Township
- Vergennes Township

=== Census-designated places ===
- Byron Center
- Cannonsburg
- Comstock Park
- Cutlerville
- Forest Hills
- Northview

=== Other unincorporated communities ===
- Ada
- Alaska
- Alto
- Belmont
- Cascade
- Chauncey
- Dutton
- Englishville
- Parnell

== See also ==
- Kent District Library
- List of Michigan State Historic Sites in Kent County
- National Register of Historic Places listings in Kent County, Michigan
