= Northview =

Northview can refer to a location in the United States:

- Northview, Michigan
- Northview, Missouri
- Northview High School (disambiguation) (several)
