= North Kent Mall =

Former shopping mall in Grand Rapids, Michigan, United States

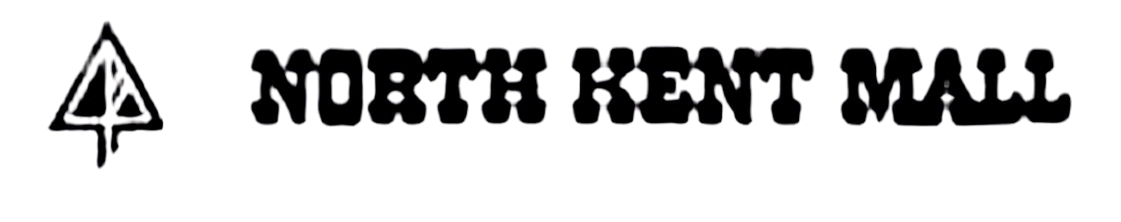
- Location: Northview, Michigan, U.S.
- Coordinates: 43°02′30″N 85°36′40″W
- Address: 4311 Plainfield Avenue Northeast
- Opened: September 24, 1970
- Closed: May 2001
- Developer: Forbes-Cohen
- Manager: Lormax Stern
- Owner: Lormax Stern
- Num. of stores: 50+
- Num. of anchor tenants: 2 (original mall)
- Floor area: 587,000 square feet (54,500 m^{2})
- Floors: 1

North Kent Mall was a shopping mall in Northview, Michigan just north of Grand Rapids, Michigan, United States. Opened in 1970, it originally featured Wurzburg's and Montgomery Ward as its anchor stores, with the former being replaced by Kmart in 1978. After a period of decline, the mall was demolished in 2000 except for Kmart and Montgomery Ward, which closed during the mall's demolition and replacement with a Lowe's home improvement store. The former site of the mall is occupied by a power center comprising Lowe's, Dunham's Sports, Dollar Tree, Family Farm and Home, and Devon Self Storage. The property is owned and managed by Lormax Stern.

== History ==
Forbes-Cohen (now known as Forbes Company), a retail developer based in Detroit, Michigan, announced plans for North Kent Mall in August 1969. The site chosen for the mall was Plainfield Avenue, on the northeastern side of Grand Rapids, Michigan. Their plans called for a 250,000-square-foot (23,000 m^{2}) enclosed shopping mall with about 65 tenants, situated between two anchor stores: Montgomery Ward and Grand Rapids-based Wurzburg's. Representatives of Forbes-Cohen said they considered the complex a "sister" to Lansing Mall, which the firm had opened in Lansing, Michigan, in mid-1969. Construction of North Kent Mall required clearing of 70 acres (28 ha) of land, and building costs were estimated at $10,000,000.

Wurzburg's opened for business on August 13, 1970. The 95,000-square-foot (8,800 m^{2}) store was the fourth in the chain. The rest of the mall including Montgomery Ward held its grand opening on September 24, 1970. Opening day events were originally planned to be held outside the mall, but were moved into the corridors due to a rainstorm. These events included a ribbon-cutting ceremony hosted by Gerald Ford, then a member of the United States House of Representatives, as well as executives of Forbes-Cohen, Montgomery Ward, and Wurzburg's. On opening day, about 40 of the 60 stores were open for business. According to an ad in The Grand Rapids Press, among the stores open for business were Baskin-Robbins, Hallmark Cards, Kinney Shoes, Orange Julius, Spencer Gifts, and Waldenbooks.

Wurzburg's closed its store at North Kent Mall in May 1973. John W. Butler, owner of the Wurzburg's chain at the time, attributed the closure to the 1973–1975 recession and over-expansion of the chain. Representatives of Forbes-Cohen stated that the closure was not formally announced in advance, but that they would be consulting other retailers for potential replacements of the Wurzburg's store. Following a financial reorganization and purchase by an investment firm, Wurzburg's reopened the North Kent Mall store in October 1974. By mid-1977, The Grand Rapids Press reported on the possibility of the Wurzburg's at North Kent Mall closing a second time, as the store had not been re-stocked in several months and representatives of Kmart had expressed interest in purchasing the building. Despite these reports, the chain's then-owner did not make a formal declaration of the store's second closure. The Wurzburg's at North Kent Mall closed by year's end, thus becoming the last store in the chain to close. Kmart opened in the former Wurzburg's location on February 23, 1978.

=== 1980s ===
The mall held a tenth-anniversary celebration throughout October 1980 with a country music theme. Elements of the celebration included a country music concert, a farmers' market, a Western-themed fashion show held by all clothiers within the mall at the time, and free country music albums for patrons who spotted mystery shoppers in Stetson hats. At the time, the mall housed about 50 stores, with 20 being local or regional and about 30 being national chains. Among the local stores were Plainfield Apparel, Klein's Men's Store, Gantos, and a Zondervan Christian bookstore. National chains with a presence at the mall in 1980 included Casual Corner, Gap, and Foot Locker, which opened that year. Additionally, United Artists Theaters (now part of Regal Cinemas) announced plans to build an eight-screen movie theater near the mall.

Forbes-Cohen sold North Kent Mall to Ramco-Gershenson Properties (now known as RPT Realty) for an undisclosed amount in February 1984. According to Forbes-Cohen representatives, the decision to sell the property was not due to declining sales, as it was still 98 percent occupied at the time. Ramco-Gershenson Properties served as manager, while North Kent Mall Partnership, a group of 30 local investors, was the owner. Workers at various malls across Grand Rapids noted that, despite the Grand Rapids area having several malls at the time, each one was able to stay competitive with the other. They stated this was due to each of them having different mixes of tenants and a variety of events to draw in customers, which in the case of North Kent Mall included annual displays of boats and recreational vehicles. In 1989, the mall had a reported size of 587,000 square feet (54,500 m^{2}).

=== 1990s decline ===
North Kent Mall underwent a number of store closings in the 1990s, including CVS, Circus World, Endicott Johnson Corporation, and several local stores. The mall's then-manager and representatives of Ramco-Gershenson attributed these closures mainly to chains that were closing elsewhere in Michigan as well, or stores whose leases had expired. Also contributing to the store closures was a decision by Ramco-Gershenson to attract new tenants, including a possible third anchor store. North Kent Mall Limited Partnership filed for bankruptcy in June 1992, as a means of restructuring company debt and allocating funds to remodel the mall. Despite the proposal of a third anchor, several more tenants closed throughout the early 1990s; many merchants who felt traffic and occupancy were declining attributed the early 1990s recession as well as the bankruptcy of the mall's owners and failure to attract a third anchor store. Representatives of the partnership also thought the closure of a bridge crossing the Grand River near the mall, and new retailers opening in Walker and Kentwood, furthered a decline in tenancy at this point. The partnership successfully exited bankruptcy in 1993, by which point Motherhood Maternity and Sbarro both closed due to expiration of leases. Schostak, a mall-management company also based in Detroit, assumed management rights in 1994, while Chicago-based Balcor assumed ownership as a condition of the Limited Partnership's exit from bankruptcy. Also that same year, McDonald's, Jo-Ann Fabrics, and Brauns opened in the mall.

Balcor, a Chicago-based firm, bought the mall in 1994 as a condition of the Limited Partnership's exit from bankruptcy. By 1997, The Grand Rapids Press reported that the mall's ownership was unknown to several of the shops' managers. Some of the tenants believed Balcor had sold the mall to MassMutual, but representatives of both those companies and Schostak were unresponsive to inquiries by the newspaper regarding the mall's ownership. The mall was sold in late 1998 to Isle of Skye, a Chicago-based partnership. This also resulted in Schostak no longer serving as manager, as Isle of Skye founder Michael Morrison hired CB Richard Ellis in this regard. CB Richard Ellis announced renovation plans in 1999, which would rename the mall to Northfield while also adding a third anchor store and big-box stores. Chain stores still within the mall at this point included Foot Locker, Waldenbooks, Radio Shack, and The Limited. These plans were canceled when Jupiter Development of Southfield, Michigan, attempted to purchase the mall from Isle of Skye in 2000. At the time, no renovations had begun, and the property was about 30 percent occupied. Jupiter Development, partnering with Lormax Stern, purchased both North Kent and Eastbrook malls (now known as Shops at CenterPoint) in mid-2000 and announced their own plans to renovate both properties. By year's end, Lormax Stern announced plans to demolish the mall in favor of a Lowe's home improvement store, leaving open the locations of Kmart and Montgomery Ward in the process and allowing the few remaining tenants to move to stores on the periphery. The mall closed in May 2001 and demolition began soon afterward. Shortly before demolition began, Montgomery Ward went out of business, closing both the North Kent Mall store and a location at Rogers Plaza.

=== 2001–present: After closure ===
Jupiter Development acquired the former Montgomery Ward location after its closure, and sold its former automotive repair shop to Plainfield Township with the intent of converting it to a fire station. Lowe's opened in 2002, displacing the mall building. Kmart and the former Montgomery Ward remained in place; by 2003, portions of the former Montgomery Ward had been re-tenanted by Dunham's Sports and Dollar Tree. The rest of the former Montgomery Ward space became Family Farm and Home soon afterward. Kmart closed in 2016. Three years after closure, the former Kmart was re-tenanted by a self storage service called Devon Self Storage.

As of 2025, the former North Kent Mall is owned by Lormax Stern. The site is tenanted by Devon Self Storage, Lowe's, Family Farm and Home, Dunham's Sports, and Dollar Tree.
