= Comstock Park Public Schools =

School district in Michigan, US

Address
- 101 School Street NE Comstock Park, Kent County, Michigan, 49321; United States

District information
- Grades: Pre-Kindergarten-12
- Superintendent: Dave Wasburn
- Schools: 5
- Budget: $29,461,000 2022-2023 expenditures
- NCES District ID: 2610620

Students and staff
- Students: 1,778 (2024-2025)
- Teachers: 117.61 (on an FTE basis) (2024-2025)
- Staff: 246.61 FTE (2024-2025)
- Student–teacher ratio: 15.12 (2024-2025)
- District mascot: Panthers

Other information
- Website: www.cppschools.com

Comstock Park Public Schools is a public school district in the Grand Rapids, Michigan area. It serves parts of Comstock Park, Walker, Alpine Township, and Plainfield Township.

== History ==
Comstock Park High School has been in operation since at least 1902, but it was not a four-year school at first. A new high school was built in 1908 near 100 Betty Street NE, and it originally went to grade ten. In 1925, a new building was built on the site, and the first class graduated from it in 1927. An addition was built in 1960. The 1966 high school yearbook shows the 1908, 1925, and 1960 sections in a row along School Street NE. In 1974, the 1908 building was torn down.

The current Comstock Park High School was built in 1991, and the district rented out the former secondary school. In fall 1992, the district moved sixth graders there due to overcrowding. The 1960 section of the building, then called Mill Creek Middle School, was renovated, expanded and reopened in fall 1995. The 1925 section was torn down, but a bell from the old school was placed in a skylight in the new section. The architect of the 1991 high school building was WBDC Group.

== Schools ==
Schools in Comstock Park Public Schools District
School	Address	Notes
Comstock Park High School	150 Six Mile Rd. NE, Comstock Park	Grades 9-12. Built 1991.
Flex Academy		Alternative high school
Mill Creek Middle School	100 Betty Street NE, Comstock Park	Grades 6-8. Built 1960, renovated 1995.
Pine Island Elementary	6101 Pine Island Drive, Comstock Park	Grades 3-5
Stoney Creek Elementary	200 Lantern Dr. NW, Comstock Park	Grades K-2
Greenridge Early Childhood Center	3825 Oakridge, NE, Comstock Park	Preschool
