= Tomkins plc =

English multinational engineering company

- Type: Public limited company
- Industry: Engineering
- Founded: 1925
- Headquarters: London, United Kingdom
- Key people: David Newlands (chairman); James Nicol (CEO); Michael C. Winn (President))
- Revenue: US$4,180.1 million (2009)
- Operating income: US$84.7 million (2009)
- Net income: US$(15.6) million (2009)
- Owner: Onex and the Canada Pension Plan Investment Board
- Number of employees: circa 30,000

Tomkins plc was a multinational engineering company headquartered in London, United Kingdom. In July 2010 Tomkins was acquired by a Canadian consortium of private equity firm Onex Corporation and the Canada Pension Plan Investment Board (CPPIB). In July 2014, The Blackstone Group, the world's largest buyout firm, agreed to acquire The Gates Corporation, the largest division of Tomkins plc from Onex and CPPIB for $5.4 billion.

== History ==
Tomkins was founded in 1925 as F.H. Tomkins Buckle Company, a small manufacturer of buckles and fasteners. It was first listed on the London Stock Exchange in 1956.

In 1983, ex-Lord Hanson employee Greg Hutchings acquired a 22.9% stake in the company, and subsequently was appointed Chief executive. Hutchings expanded Tomkins in a classical conglomerate form through leveraged buyouts, and during the 1980s and early 1990s the company embarked on a succession of acquisitions which rapidly grew its revenue, product range and global reach. Major acquisitions included Smith & Wesson in 1987, RHM in 1992, the US-based Gates Corporation in 1996, which signalled a move into the industrial and automotive markets, and the Stant and Schrader businesses that further bolstered this division. During this era, Tomkins was regarded as the archetypal multi-industrial conglomerate, with a portfolio of assets that had little or nothing in common with one another – and indeed the media delighted in referring to Tomkins as the "buns-to-guns" company because of its ownership of RHM (baking) and Smith & Wesson (firearms).

Hutchings was forced to resign from the company in 2000, over a series of allegations of executive excess. Tomkins sold RHM shortly thereafter, and Smith & Wesson the following year.

After an unsolicited approach, in July 2010 Tomkins was acquired by a Canadian consortium of private equity firm Onex Corporation and the Canada Pension Plan Investment Board for £2.9 billion.

In November 2012, Tomkins sold their portion of the Building Products group that included: Hart and Cooley, Selkirk and Ruskin to the CPPIB.
