= Plainfield Township, Kent County, Michigan =

Charter township in Michigan, United States

Plainfield Township, Michigan
- Charter township
- Plainfield Charter Township
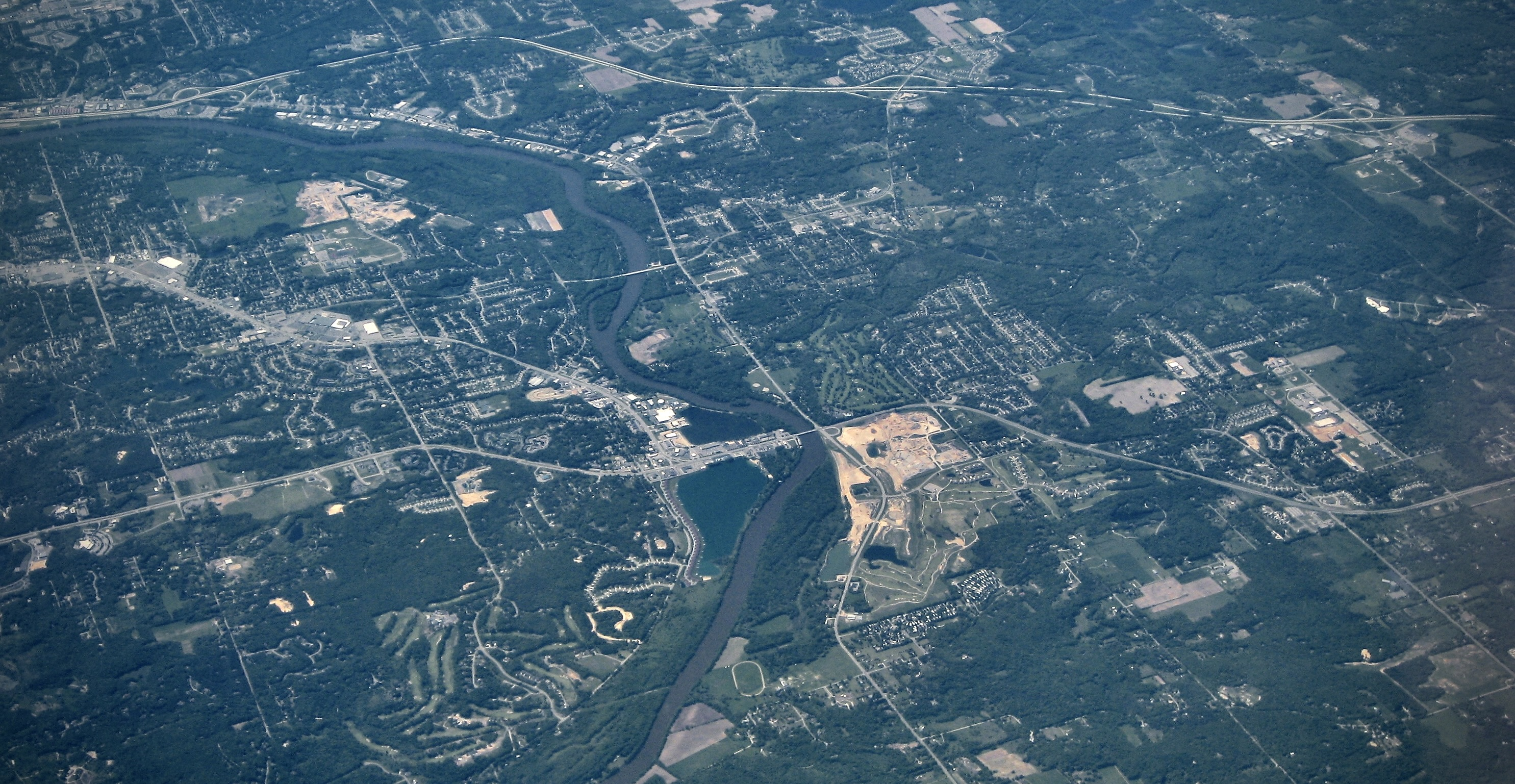
- Aerial photograph of Plainfield Township in 2009

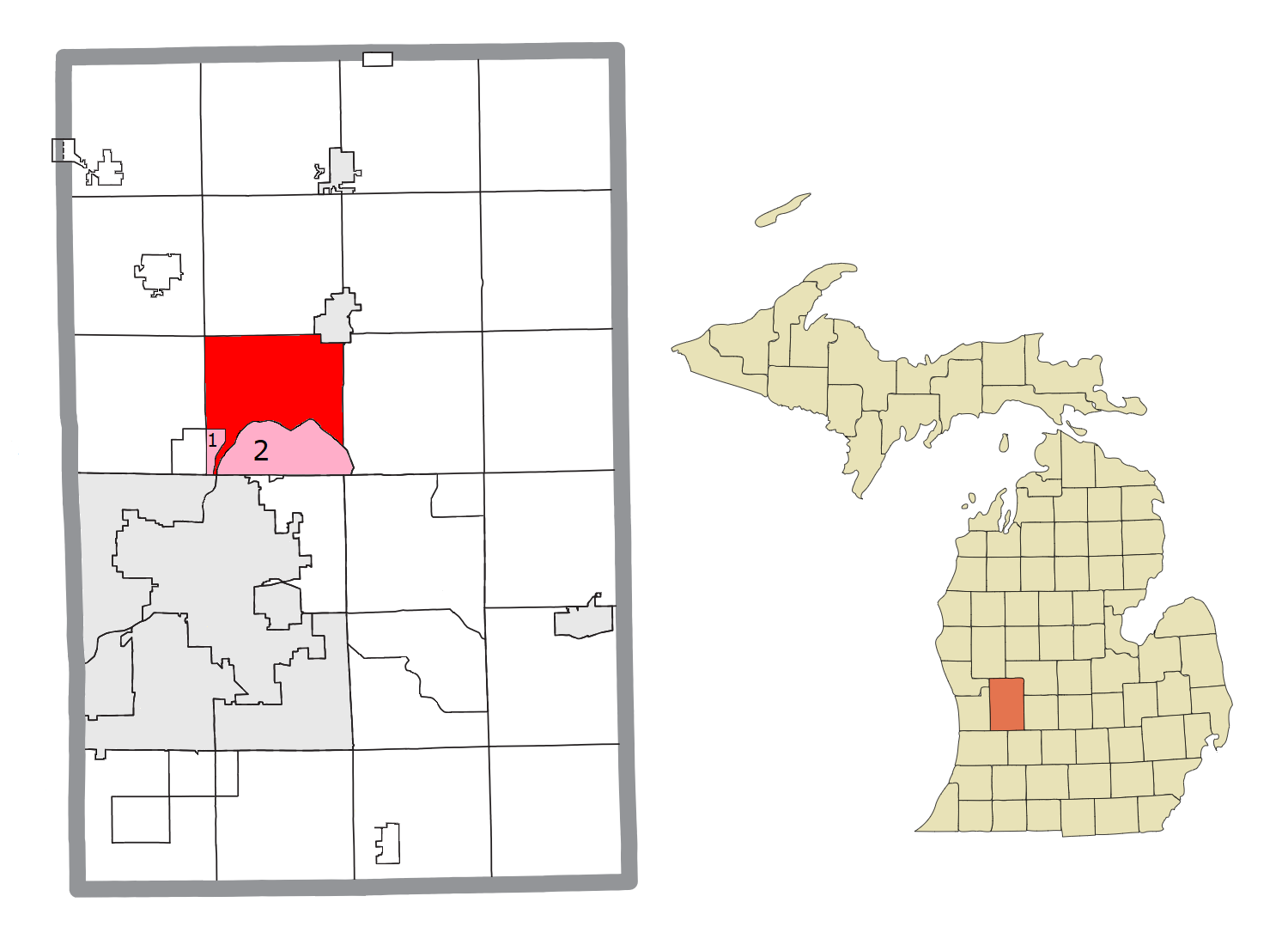
- Location within Kent County (red) and administered portions of the Comstock Park (1) and Northview (2) CDPs (pink)

- Location within the state of Michigan Location within the United States
- Coordinates: 43°03′32″N 85°36′49″W
- Country: United States
- State: Michigan
- County: Kent
- Established: 1838

Government
  - Supervisor: Tom Coleman
  - Clerk: Cathleen Postmus

Area
  - Total: 36.73 sq mi (95.13 km^{2})
  - Land: 35.04 sq mi (90.75 km^{2})
  - Water: 1.69 sq mi (4.38 km^{2})
- Elevation: 663 ft (202 m)

Population (2020)
  - Total: 33,535
  - Density: 957.1/sq mi (369.5/km^{2})
- Time zone: UTC-5 (Eastern (EST))
  - Summer (DST): UTC-4 (EDT)
- ZIP code(s): 49306 (Belmont); 49321 (Comstock Park); 49341 (Rockford); 49525 (Northview)
- Area code: 616
- FIPS code: 26-081-64660
- GNIS feature ID: 1626912
- Website: Official website

Plainfield Charter Township is a charter township of Kent County in the U.S. state of Michigan. The population was 33,535 at the 2020 census.

It is part of the Grand Rapids metropolitan area and is bordered by Grand Rapids on the south.

== Communities ==
- Belmont is an unincorporated community in the township, situated on the north side of the Grand River at exit 95 off U.S. Highway 131 where the Rogue River joins the Grand. Belmont is at 43°04′32″N 85°36′33″W. The community has its own post office with the 49306 ZIP Code. It was platted in 1874.
- Chauncey (also known as Buena Vista and Imperial Mills) is an unincorporated, also mostly historical settlement on the eastern boundary with Cannon Township where Bear Creek enters the Grand River.
- Childsdale (historic) was a small unincorporated community within the township located where Childsdale Avenue crosses the Rogue River on the northeastern boundary with Rockford. The small community was the site of a lumber and paper mill and a stop on the Grand Rapids and Indiana Railroad. It was started in 1848 around a sawmill. It had a post office starting in 1900.
- Comstock Park is a census-designated place and unincorporated community partially within the township. It is on the west side of the Grand River in the southwest corner of the township and extends west into Alpine Township.
- Northview is a census-designated place and unincorporated community within the township. It is located between the boundaries with Grand Rapids, Grand Rapids Township, Comstock Park, and Belmont.

== Geography ==
According to the U.S. Census Bureau, the township has a total area of 36.73 square miles (95.13 km^{2}), of which 35.04 square miles (90.75 km^{2}) is land and 1.69 square miles (4.38 km^{2}) (4.60%) is water.

The Grand River flows through the southern portion of the township, and the Rogue River is a tributary that flows south into the Grand River within the township.

Plainfield Township is bordered by Alpine Township to the west, Algoma Township and the city of Rockford to the north, Cannon Township to the east, Ada Township to the southeast, Grand Rapids Charter Township and the city of Grand Rapids to the south, and the city of Walker to the southwest.

=== Major highways ===
- US 131 runs south–north through the western portion of the township.
- M-44 (Beltline Avenue) runs south–north through the eastern portion of the township. M-44 also contains a connector route within the community that links it to Interstate 96 to the south in Grand Rapids.

== Education ==
Plainfield Township is served by four separate school districts. Northview Public School District serves the southern portion of the township in the Northview community. Rockford Public Schools serves the northern portion of the township, and Rockford High School is within the township. Comstock Park Public Schools serves a small western portion, and Kenowa Hills Public Schools also serves a very small western portion of the township.

== Demographics ==
=== 2020 census ===
As of the 2020 United States census, the township had a population of 33,535 people. The racial makeup was 88.7% Non-Hispanic White, 2.2% Black or African American, 0.5% Asian, 0.3% Native American, and 5.1% from two or more races. Hispanic or Latino people of any race were 4.9% of the population.

=== 2000 census ===
As of the census of 2000, there were 30,195 people, 11,038 households, and 8,168 families residing in the township. The population density was 859.2 inhabitants per square mile (331.7/km^{2}). There were 11,456 housing units at an average density of 326.0 units per square mile (125.9 units/km^{2}). The racial makeup of the township was 95.68% White, 1.22% African American, 0.32% Native American, 0.93% Asian, 0.04% Pacific Islander, 0.61% from other races, and 1.19% from two or more races. Hispanic or Latino of any race were 1.75% of the population.

There were 11,038 households, out of which 39.9% had children under the age of 18 living with them, 62.3% were married couples living together, 8.7% had a female householder with no husband present, and 26.0% were non-families. 21.7% of all households were made up of individuals, and 6.7% had someone living alone who was 65 years of age or older. The average household size was 2.73 and the average family size was 3.22.

In the township the population was spread out, with 30.0% under the age of 18, 8.0% from 18 to 24, 29.9% from 25 to 44, 22.7% from 45 to 64, and 9.3% who were 65 years of age or older. The median age was 35 years. For every 100 females, there were 98.7 males. For every 100 females age 18 and over, there were 94.1 males.

The median income for a household in the township was $55,181, and the median income for a family was $62,241. Males had a median income of $45,757 versus $30,122 for females. The per capita income for the township was $23,753. About 3.3% of families and 4.2% of the population were below the poverty line, including 4.1% of those under age 18 and 5.1% of those age 65 or over.
