= Comstock Park, Michigan =

- Census-designated place (CDP) & unincorporated community
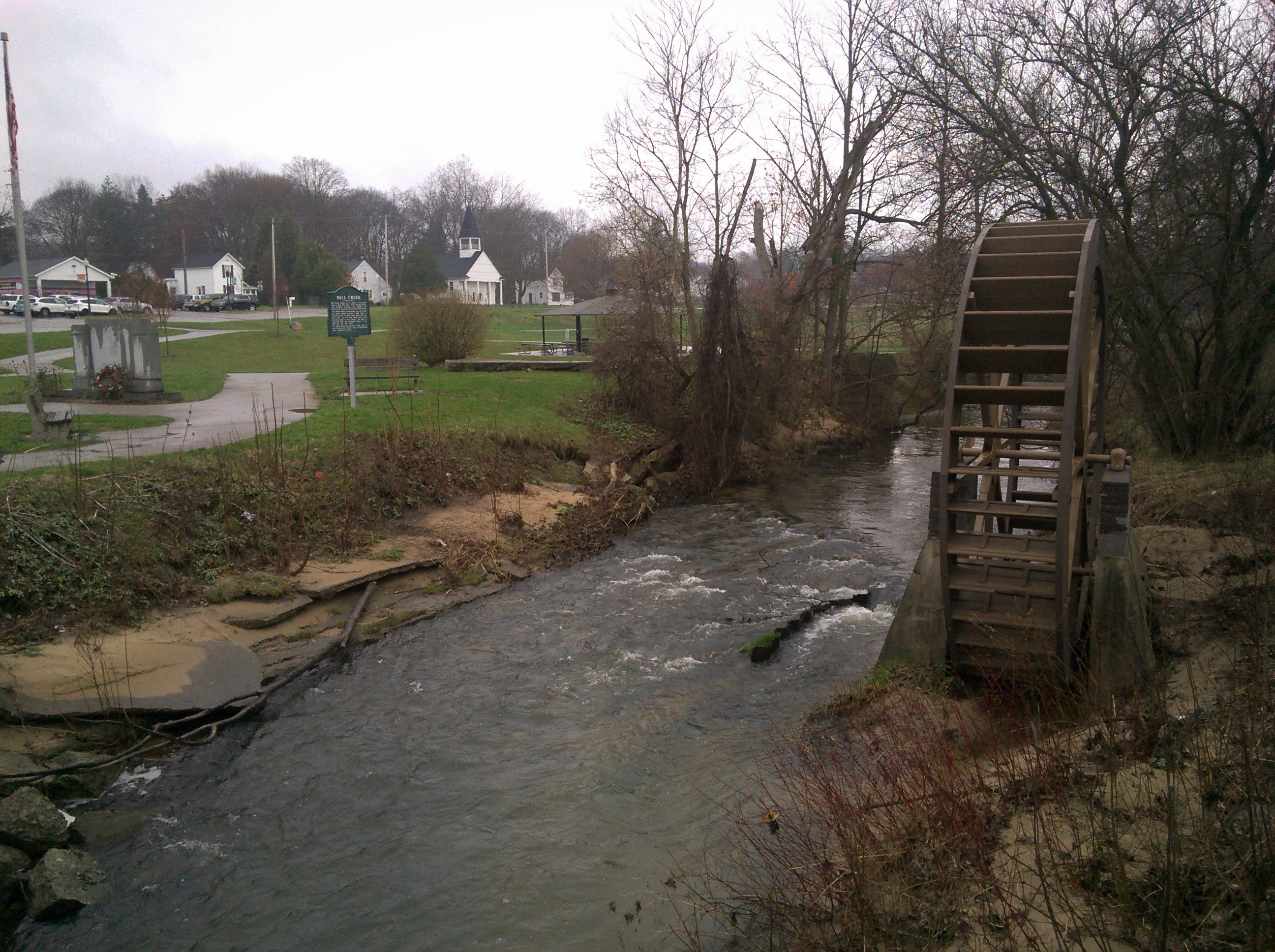
- Mill Creek passing through Comstock Park

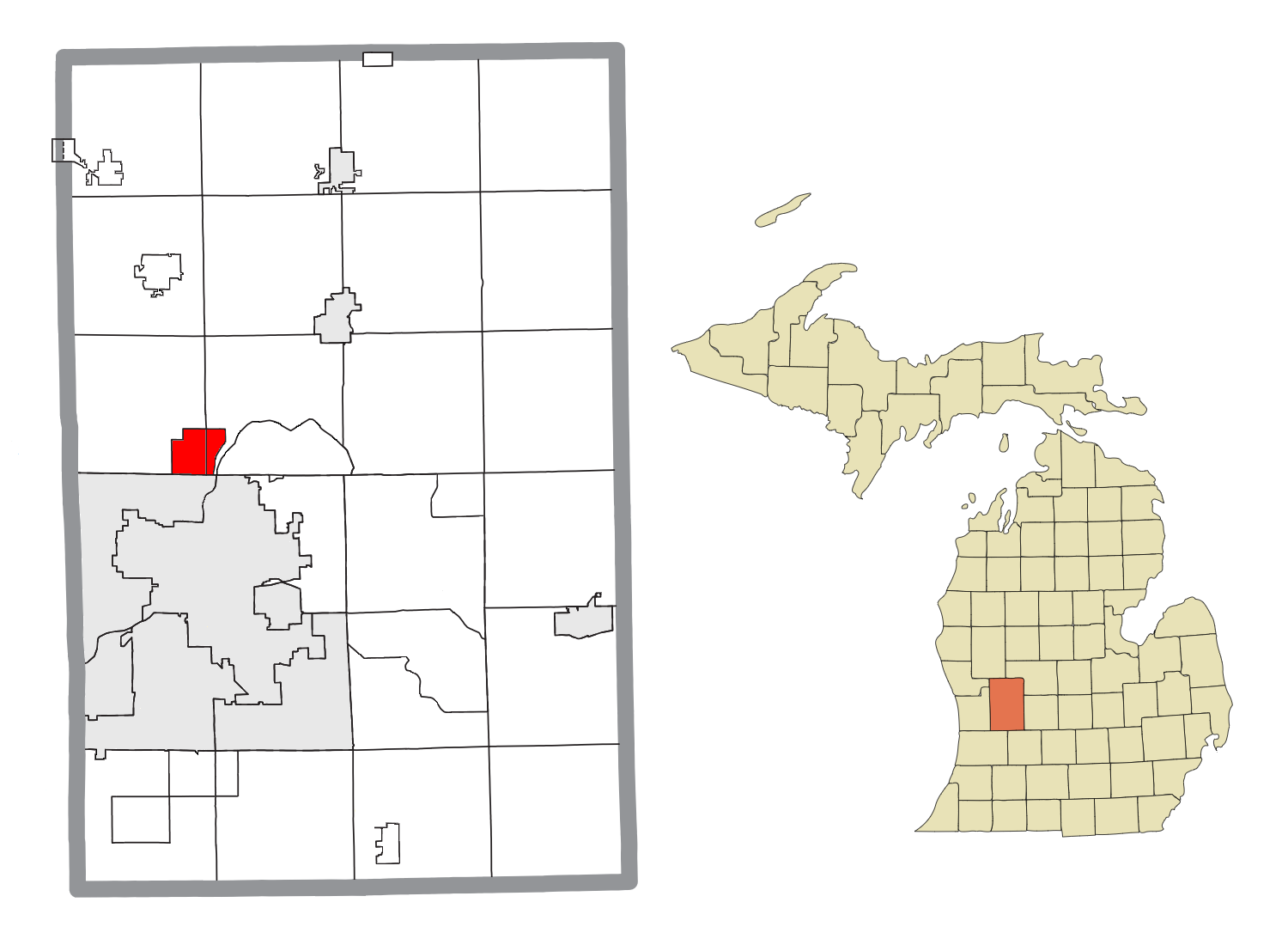
- Location within Kent County

- Location within the state of Michigan Location within the United States
- Coordinates: 43°02′19″N 85°40′12″W
- Country: United States
- State: Michigan
- County: Kent
- Townships: Alpine and Plainfield
- Settled: 1838

Area
  - Total: 3.89 sq mi (10.07 km^{2})
  - Land: 3.88 sq mi (10.05 km^{2})
  - Water: 0.0077 sq mi (0.02 km^{2})
- Elevation: 659 ft (201 m)

Population (2020)
  - Total: 10,500
  - Density: 2,706.6/sq mi (1,045.01/km^{2})
- Time zone: UTC-5 (Eastern (EST))
  - Summer (DST): UTC-4 (EDT)
- ZIP code(s): 49321; 49544 (Grand Rapids)
- Area code: 616
- FIPS code: 26-17700
- GNIS feature ID: 0623677

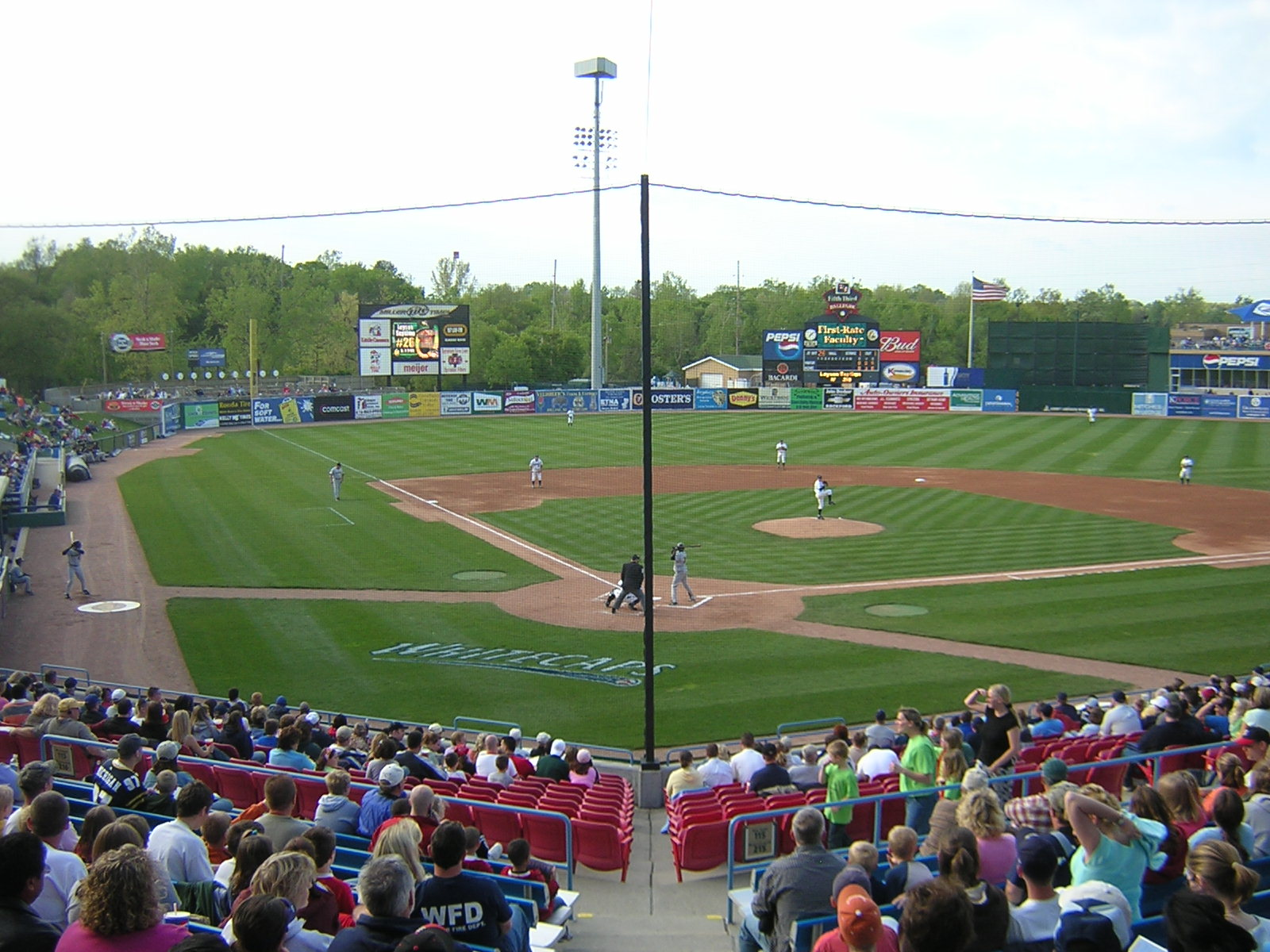
LMCU Ballpark is home to the West Michigan Whitecaps.

Comstock Park is an unincorporated community and census-designated place (CDP) in Kent County in the U.S. state of Michigan. The population was 10,500 at the 2020 census. The community is located within Alpine Township to the west and Plainfield Township to the east.

The community is part of the Grand Rapids metropolitan area, with the city of Walker to the south and Grand Rapids just to the southeast. Comstock Park is the home of the West Michigan Whitecaps, an affiliate of the Detroit Tigers, who play their games at LMCU Ballpark. The Fred Meijer White Pine Trail State Park also passes through the community.

== History ==
In 1838, a settlement known as North's Mill was established by Daniel North. The name changed to Mill Creek in 1848. The area became a major transportation hub, serving both the Grand Rapids and Indiana Railroad and Chicago and Western Indiana Railroad, and set the tone for becoming the northern Grand Rapids-area crossroads it is today. It was renamed Comstock Park in 1906 after politician Charles C. Comstock, who served the district in the U.S. House of Representatives for one term from 1885–1887.

== Geography ==
According to the U.S. Census Bureau, the Comstock Park CDP has a total area of 3.89 square miles (10.08 km^{2}), of which 3.88 square miles (10.05 km^{2}) is land and 0.01 square miles (0.03 km^{2}) (0.26%) is water.

The Grand River flows just east of the community.

== Transportation ==
=== Bus ===
- The Rapid operates one bus route in Comstock Park, Route 9, with service to Rapid Central Station via Alpine Avenue.

=== Major highways ===
- US 131
- M-37

== Education ==
Comstock Park Public Schools serves the majority of the community, while Kenowa Hills Public Schools serves a smaller western portion of the community. The Kent District Library KDL Service Center is near Comstock Park in Plainfield Township.

== Demographics ==
Historical population
Census	Pop.	Note	%±
2000	10,674		—
2010	10,088		−5.5%
2020	10,500		4.1%
U.S. Decennial Census

=== 2020 census ===
As of the 2020 census, Comstock Park had a population of 10,500. The median age was 32.9 years. 22.4% of residents were under the age of 18 and 13.4% of residents were 65 years of age or older. For every 100 females there were 95.0 males, and for every 100 females age 18 and over there were 92.4 males age 18 and over.

99.8% of residents lived in urban areas, while 0.2% lived in rural areas.

There were 4,582 households in Comstock Park, of which 28.9% had children under the age of 18 living in them. Of all households, 33.9% were married-couple households, 23.4% were households with a male householder and no spouse or partner present, and 31.9% were households with a female householder and no spouse or partner present. About 31.6% of all households were made up of individuals and 10.1% had someone living alone who was 65 years of age or older.

There were 4,839 housing units, of which 5.3% were vacant. The homeowner vacancy rate was 0.2% and the rental vacancy rate was 5.6%.

Racial composition as of the 2020 census
Race	Number	Percent
White	7,526	71.7%
Black or African American	958	9.1%
American Indian and Alaska Native	83	0.8%
Asian	175	1.7%
Native Hawaiian and Other Pacific Islander	2	0.0%
Some other race	823	7.8%
Two or more races	933	8.9%
Hispanic or Latino (of any race)	1,651	15.7%

=== 2000 census ===
As of the census of 2000, there were 10,674 people, 4,441 households, and 2,513 families residing in the community. The population density was 2,735.0 inhabitants per square mile (1,056.0/km^{2}). There were 4,654 housing units at an average density of 1,192.5 per square mile (460.4/km^{2}). The racial makeup of the community was 87.30% White, 3.91% African American, 0.77% Native American, 1.92% Asian, 0.06% Pacific Islander, 3.33% from other races, and 2.73% from two or more races. Hispanic or Latino of any race were 7.22% of the population.

Of the 4,441 households, 29.5% had children under the age of 18 living with them, 39.5% were married couples living together, 12.0% had a female householder with no husband present, and 43.4% were not families. About 27.3% of all households were made up of individuals, and 4.7% had someone living alone who was 65 years of age or older. The average household size was 2.40 and the average family size was 2.98.

In the community, the population was distributed as with 23.8% under the age of 18, 20.4% from 18 to 24, 31.8% from 25 to 44, 16.5% from 45 to 64, and 7.6% who were 65 years of age or older. The median age was 27 years. For every 100 females, there were 101.9 males. For every 100 females age 18 and over, there were 99.5 males.

The median income for a household in the community was $40,202, and for a family was $47,154. Males had a median income of $36,076 versus $26,331 for females. The per capita income for the community was $19,911. About 7.9% of families and 9.7% of the population were below the poverty line, including 12.7% of those under age 18 and 2.2% of those age 65 or over.
