= Kent District Library =

Library system in Kent County, Michigan

- Location: Kent County, Michigan, United States
- Established: 1927
- Branches: 20 plus one bookmobile

Collection
- Size: 1,025,580 (2016)

Access and use
- Circulation: 8,260,738 (2016)
- Members: 258,338 (2016)

Other information
- Budget: $22.3 million (2017)
- Director: Lance M. Werner
- Employees: 221 (2016)
- Website: www.kdl.org

The Kent District Library is a public library system located in Kent County, Michigan. With twenty branch locations and an annual circulation of more than 8.2 million items (2016 circulation data), the Kent District Library is one of the largest and busiest library systems in all of Michigan.

The KDL Service Center, the library system headquarters, are in Plainfield Township, near the Comstock Park CDP.

== History ==
The beginnings of the library are in 1927 as a library extension work project of the Kent County Federation of Women's Clubs. The Kent County Library Association was established in 1936 and functioned as a department of Kent County until 1994 when it became Kent District Library.

In summer 2013, Kent District Library invited local Wikipedians to use library space and resources for Meetups, and offered Wikipedia editing classes to the community.

== Branch locations ==
The library has 20 branches throughout the county and one bookmobile.

- Ada Township (Amy Van Andel Library and Community Center)
- Alpine
- Alto
- Byron Township
- Caledonia Township
- Cascade Township
- Comstock Park
- East Grand Rapids
- Gaines Township
- Grandville
- Kelloggsville High School
- Kentwood
- Lowell (Englehardt Branch)
- Plainfield Township
- Rockford (Krause Memorial Branch)
- Sand Lake / Nelson Township
- Spencer Township
- Tyrone Township
- Walker
- Wyoming
