= Covenant Christian High School =

Covenant Christian High School can refer to:

- Covenant Christian High School (Indianapolis, Indiana)
- Covenant Christian High School (DeMotte, Indiana)
- Covenant Christian High School (Michigan)
