= KHHS =

KHHS may refer to:

- KHHS (FM), is a radio station licensed to Pearcy, Arkansas
- KHHS-LP, a defunct radio station formerly licensed to San Diego, California, United States
- Kenowa Hills High School, Alpine Township, Michigan, United States
- Keystone Heights Junior/Senior High School, Keystone Heights, Florida, United States
- Killarney Heights High School, Killarney Heights, New South Wales, Australia
