= Pridgeon =

Pridgeon may refer to:

- Pridgeon & Clay, a metal stamping and fine-blank components provider
- Ken Pridgeon Stadium, an outdoor American football stadium located in Houston, Texas

== People ==
- Francis Pridgeon (also Francis Prujean, 1593–1666), English physician
- John Pridgeon, Jr. (1852–1929), the head of a marine transport company and mayor of Detroit, Michigan
- Paul Pridgeon (born 1954), English cricket player
