= Grand Rapids Charter Township, Michigan =

Grand Rapids Township, Michigan
- Charter township
- Grand Rapids Charter Township
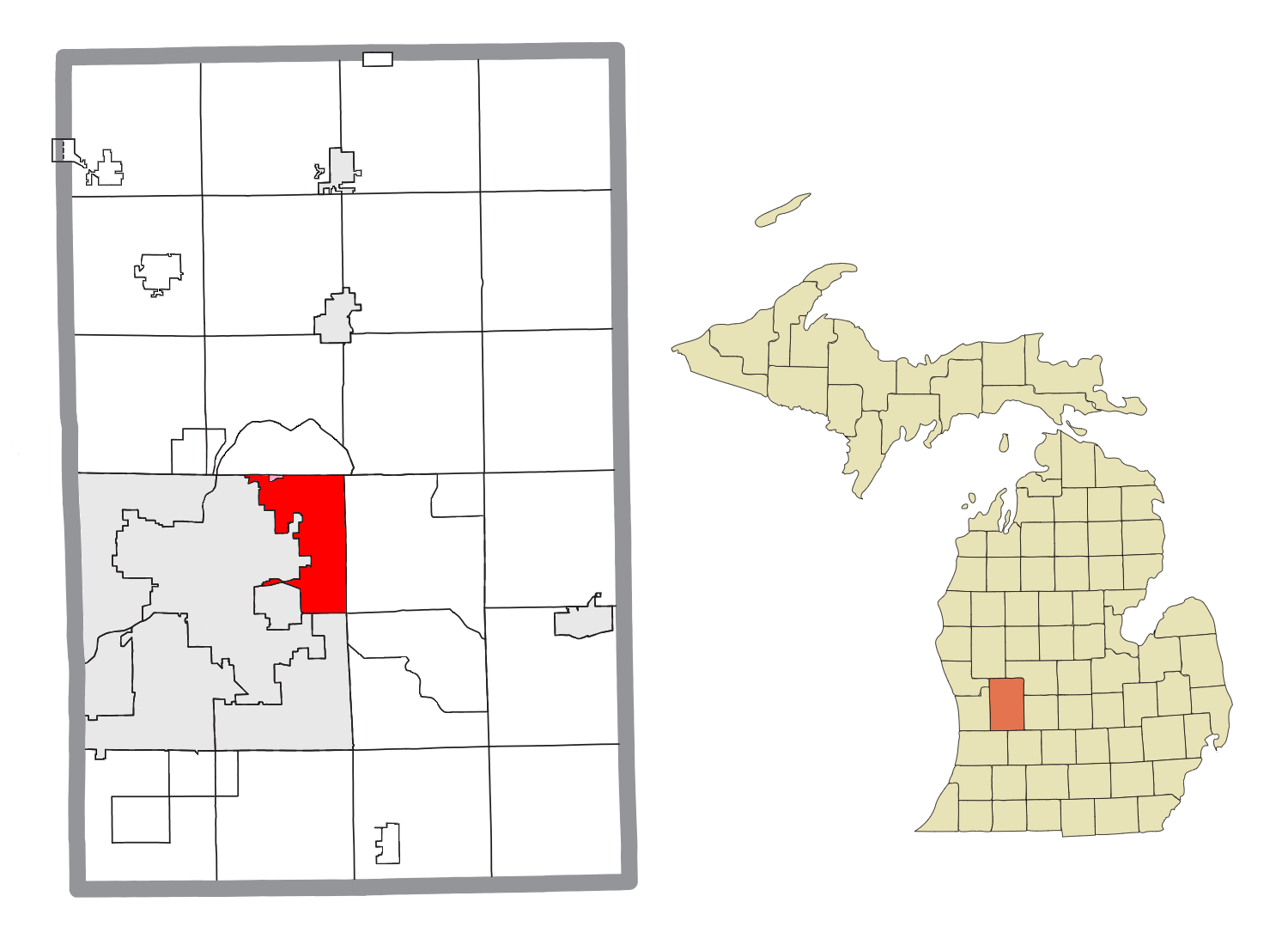
- Location within Kent County

- Location within the state of Michigan Location within the United States
- Coordinates: 42°59′08″N 85°35′14″W
- Country: United States
- State: Michigan
- County: Kent
- Established: 1834

Government
  - Supervisor: Michael DeVries
  - Clerk: Edward Robinette

Area
  - Total: 15.55 sq mi (40.28 km^{2})
  - Land: 15.33 sq mi (39.71 km^{2})
  - Water: 0.22 sq mi (0.57 km^{2})
- Elevation: 807 ft (246 m)

Population (2020)
  - Total: 18,905
  - Density: 1,233/sq mi (476/km^{2})
- Time zone: UTC-5 (Eastern (EST))
  - Summer (DST): UTC-4 (EDT)
- ZIP code(s): 49301 (Ada); 49506, 49525, 49546 (Grand Rapids)
- Area code: 616
- FIPS code: 26-34020
- GNIS feature ID: 1626374
- Website: Official website

Grand Rapids Charter Township is a charter township of Kent County in the U.S. state of Michigan. The population was 18,905 at the 2020 census.

The township is bordered by Grand Rapids to the west and East Grand Rapids to the southwest, but the township is administered autonomously.

== Communities ==
- Northview is an unincorporated community and census-designated place (CDP) with a very small portion located within Grand Rapids Township. The majority of the CDP is to the north in Plainfield Township.

== History ==
The township was first organized in 1834 under the name Kent Township. The village of Grand Rapids was within the township, and the state renamed the township as Grand Rapids Township in 1842. The village incorporated as an autonomous city from portions of the township in 1850. Grand Rapids Township became a charter township in 1979.

== Geography ==
According to the U.S. Census Bureau, the township has a total area of 15.55 square miles (40.27 km^{2}), of which 15.33 square miles (39.70 km^{2}) is land and 0.22 square miles (0.57 km^{2}) (1.41%) is water.

=== Major highways ===
- I-96 runs diagonally to the northwest through portions of the township.
- M-21 runs east–west through the southern portion of the township.
- M-44 runs south–north through the center of the township.

== Demographics ==
=== 2020 census ===
As of the 2020 United States census, the township had a population of 18,905 people. The racial makeup was 84.9% Non-Hispanic White, 2.5% Black or African American, 6.6% Asian, 0.1% Native American, and 3.7% from two or more races. Hispanic or Latino people of any race were 2.8% of the population.

=== 2000 census ===
As of the census of 2000, there were 14,056 people, 4,852 households, and 3,779 families residing in the township. The population density was 911.6 inhabitants per square mile (352.0/km^{2}). There were 5,000 housing units at an average density of 324.3 per square mile (125.2/km^{2}). The racial makeup of the township was 95.80% White, 0.99% African American, 0.18% Native American, 1.44% Asian, 0.01% Pacific Islander, 0.53% from other races, and 1.05% from two or more races. Hispanic or Latino of any race were 1.30% of the population.

There were 4,852 households, out of which 40.3% had children under the age of 18 living with them, 70.4% were married couples living together, 6.0% had a female householder with no husband present, and 22.1% were non-families. 19.8% of all households were made up of individuals, and 11.7% had someone living alone who was 65 years of age or older. The average household size was 2.78 and the average family size was 3.22.

In the township the population was spread out, with 29.0% under the age of 18, 6.0% from 18 to 24, 24.9% from 25 to 44, 24.7% from 45 to 64, and 15.4% who were 65 years of age or older. The median age was 40 years. For every 100 females, there were 91.0 males. For every 100 females age 18 and over, there were 86.4 males.

The median income for a household in the township was $66,250, and the median income for a family was $76,021. Males had a median income of $52,135 versus $36,011 for females. The per capita income for the township was $30,531. About 2.6% of families and 3.2% of the population were below the poverty line, including 3.4% of those under age 18 and 4.1% of those age 65 or over.

There has also been development recently in the township. Mostly along the M-44 corridor stretching from just north of the intersection of lake drive and M-44 on the south end and M-44 and 4 mile. New Developments include The Grove by watermark at M-44 and 4 mile, Evergreen Townhomes adjacent to the Evergreen office complex, and the springs at knapp crossing just north of knapps corner. New neighborhoods include Arbor hills at the corner of 3 mile and Maguire avenue. Balsam Waters also off of Maguire avenue.
