= Kenowa Hills Public Schools =

Public school

Address
- 2325 4 Mile Road NW Grand Rapids, Kent, Michigan, 49544; United States

District information
- Grades: Pre-Kindergarten-12
- Superintendent: Gerald W. Hopkins Jr.
- Schools: 6
- Budget: $61,571,000 2022-2023 expenditures
- NCES District ID: 2620280

Students and staff
- Students: 2,947 (2024-2025)
- Teachers: 185.96 (on an FTE basis) (2024-2025)
- Staff: 437.75 FTE (2024-2025)
- Student–teacher ratio: 15.85 (2024-2025)

Other information
- Website: khps.org

Kenowa Hills Public Schools is a public school district in Greater Grand Rapids, Michigan. In Kent County, it serves portions of Alpine Township, Comstock Park, and Walker. In Ottawa County, it serves parts of Tallmadge Township and Wright Township.

== History ==
Kenowa Hills Public Schools is a district located in the northwest suburban corner of the Grand Rapids area. The district contains a blend of residential areas, businesses, commercial development, and orchards. Kenowa Hills Public Schools was formed when nearly a dozen single-building and rural school districts consolidated in the early 1960s. The district's name was derived from the names of the two counties it services: Kent and Ottawa counties.

Berlin High School in Marne, an unincorporated village in Wright Township, was established by 1948. Kenowa Hills High School opened in 1963, replacing it.

The present high school building opened in 1999. The former high school became the middle school. Before the 2010–2011 school year, Kenowa Hills closed Marne Elementary and Fairview Elementary, two of the original school districts. Walker Station Elementary was converted to an Early Childhood Center. The Intermediate School, fifth and sixth grade, was turned into an elementary school named Central Elementary.

== Schools ==
Schools in Kenowa Hills Public Schools district
School	Address	Notes
Early Childhood Center	3971 Richmond Court NW, Grand Rapids	Preschool
Alpine Elementary	4730 Baumhoff NW, Comstock Park	Grades K-5
Central Elementary	4252 3 Mile Rd NW, Grand Rapids	Grades K-5
Zinser Elementary	3949 Leonard NW, Grand Rapids	Grades K-5
Kenowa Hills Middle School	3950 Hendershot NW, Grand Rapids	Grades 6-8. Built 1963.
Kenowa Hills High School	3825 Hendershot NW, Grand Rapids	Grades 9-12. Built 1999.
Knights STEM Academy	3950 Hendershot NW, Grand Rapids	Grades 9-11. Housed within Kenowa Hills Middle School.
Pathways High School	3950 Hendershot NW, Grand Rapids	Alternative high school with an online curriculum, located at Kenowa Hills Middle School.
Link Learning	3563 Alpine Avenue NW, Grand Rapids	Alternative high school
