= Covenant Christian High School (Michigan) =

Private school in Walker, Michigan, US

Coordinates: 42.9396°N 85.7783°W

Covenant Christian High School (CCHS) is a private Christian high school in Walker, Michigan, in Greater Grand Rapids. It has a Grand Rapids, Michigan postal address.

The Society for Protestant Reformed Secondary Education established the school in 1968 and catered it towards believers of the Protestant Reformed Churches. As of 2012 it has over 330 students and 28 employees. The employees include one administrator, 19 full-time teachers, 3 part-time teachers, two "academic support teachers," one library media specialist, and two counselors.
