= Northview High School =

Northview High School may refer to:

- Northview Heights Secondary School, Toronto District School Board, Ontario
- Northview High School (Brazil, Indiana)
- Northview High School (California), Covina-Valley Unified School District
- Northview High School (Georgia), Johns Creek
- Northview High School (Dothan, Alabama)
- Northview High School (Century, Florida)
- Northview High School (Michigan), a suburb of Grand Rapids
- Sylvania Northview High School, Sylvania, Ohio
