= Gilson Graphics =

Commercial printing company

Gilson Graphics, Inc.
- Company type: Private company
- Industry: Printing
- Founded: Michigan, United States (June 6, 1948, as Gilson Press, Inc.)
- Headquarters: 2000 Oak Industrial Ave., Grand Rapids, Michigan
- Number of employees: 170
- Website: GilsonGraphics.com

Gilson Graphics, Inc. is a commercial printing company in Grand Rapids, Michigan. Since its incorporation, Gilson Graphics has acquired selected assets of Knickerbocker Press, National Correct Color, Axis Digital Print and Imaging, Photolith, Commercial Printing Co., Hastings Press, and Integra Printing, Inc. Founded as Gilson Press Inc. in 1948 by Lars Gilson, the business now runs two locations in Grand Rapids and also operates a composition department in Atlantic, Iowa. Subsidiaries of the company include North Star Teacher Resources (which produces and distributes educational material) and Ignition New Media Workshop (which handles multimedia and programming). The company is one of the largest printing companies in Grand Rapids.

== History ==
Grand Rapids has a rich history in the printing industry as most area printers agree that the city has more printers per capita than any other city in the United States. On June 6, 1948, Lars Gilson bought letterpress printer Dependable Printing, renamed it Gilson Press, and invested in new technology to supplement the existing equipment.

As offset printing began challenging letterpress for speed and economy of operation, Gilson Press purchased its first lithographic offset press in 1952. Construction of federal highway U.S. Route 131 in 1957 caused Gilson Press to relocate to 631 North Avenue, which is the current location of their print production department.

In 1974, Lars Gilson's oldest son, David, joined the company and four years later his second son, Mark, became an employee as well.

Gilson Graphics' former logo from 1978-2007 (text as "Gilson Press" until 1991)

In 1980, Gilson Press became the first printer in Michigan to allow text from client word processors and main frames to be electronically transferred to the composition stage. This venture began the practice of Gilson Press being a beta tester for new technology from manufacturers. In 1983, Gilson added a programmable word processor reader to eliminate most telecommunication and to read customer-furnished floppies regardless of what dedicated word processor was originally used; the first printer in Michigan to offer this service. That same year Lars Gilson's youngest son Chris entered the business, creating a family business where all three sons worked for their father's company.

In 1985, Gilson installed the Xyvision graphics system (precursor to XML Professional Publisher), becoming the second in the United States to do so.

In 1991, the company decided to change their name to Gilson Graphics, Inc., to reflect new capabilities as the company moved from a printing company that relied on outside sources for certain steps to one able to deliver all components of the reproduction process under one roof. In 1993, the company implemented an Iris printer and installed a Dolev 800 for large format output. In 1995, Gilson Graphics was selected as one of three sites in the United States for installation of the Doplate 800 and imposition workstations to drive both the Dolev and Doplate. These additions made the business the first printer in Michigan and the second in the United States with Computer to plate (CTP) workflow.

Commercial Printing Co.

In 2001, Gilson Graphics expanded prepress, layout, and design capabilities by purchasing selected assets of National Correct Color, the area's largest and oldest pre-press film separator and digital imaging company. A year later, seven employees from Axis Digital Print and Imaging joined Gilson Graphics, adding short run color, variable data printing, and large format capabilities. In late 2002, Gilson Graphics opened its educational composition and quality control department in Atlantic, Iowa, working mainly on standardized testing material. In early 2003, Chris Gilson started North Star Teacher Resources to design, produce, and distribute its own line of educational material.

Integra Printing, Inc.

In 2006, Gilson Graphics acquired assets of two companies – Photolith, Inc. (which increased sales and prepress capabilities) and Commercial Printing Co. (which added web development, small press capabilities, and increased print sales). Acquiring assets of Commercial Printing Co., a former winner of the national Addy Awards, led to the addition of Ignition, a division within Gilson Graphics that offers multimedia services. In early 2009, Gilson Graphics also purchased selected assets of Integra Printing, Inc., adding about 70 employees as well as a new headquarters. This move expanded the company's capabilities with offset and digital printing and created a Fulfillment and Mailing Services department, altogether nearly doubling sales revenue. Most recently, Gilson Graphics became the first company in North America to install Fujifilm's new J-Press 720 system, a high quality sheet-fed inkjet press.

== Awards and recognitions ==
Gilson Graphics won the 1996 Beckett Papers’ award for excellence, placing top among international entrants. In total, ten awards were given, only two of which went to U.S. companies. The winning project was produced for the Grand Rapids Children's Museum.

In 1998, Gilson Graphics won the Gold Award as North America's Printer of the Year from Sappi Inc., the world's largest papermaker. The ceremony, held in Washington D.C., awarded six printing companies in North America in individual categories. Gilson Graphics won the catalog category as judges considered the overall impact of the piece, degree of difficulty, and technical excellence. Gilson Graphics was one of the first in the world to implement CTP technology, and the only company among 3,000 entrants to use it in the competition. Gilson Graphics then went on to the international competition in Monte Carlo, where they competed against other award winners from Europe and South Africa for the International Printer of the Year honors.

Each year since 2009, the trade journal Printing Impressions has named Gilson Graphics as one of the Top 400 printers throughout the United States and Canada.

== See also ==
- Photolith
