= Gill Industries =

Business

- Founded: 1964
- Founders: John Gill; Gerald Williams
- Headquarters: Grand Rapids, Michigan, United States
- Key people: Rita Woodruff, Mary Gill-Thornton, co-CEOs
- Website: gill-industries.com

Gill Industries is an American global supplier that works mainly in welding and assembly, headquartered in Grand Rapids, Michigan, with offices in Trenton, Georgia, and Richmond, Kentucky, and global offices in Mexico, Europe and Asia. The supplying company works to assemble, develop and supply to clients in the automotive, office and wireless power markets.

It was initially named Gill & Williams Tooling as a local tool and die shop when it was created in 1964 by Clayton John Gill and Gerald Williams, his brother-in-law. It expanded into welding and assembly in the 1980s, and has been a supplier for large companies like BMW, Volkswagen, Club Car, Herman Miller and Ford Motors for years. Gill Industries also owns Gill Electronics. Gill Industries is owned by Gill Holding Company, Inc.

== Litigation ==
In Walters v. Gill Industries, Inc. (Civil Action No. 5:21-cv-00069-DCR, U.S. District Court for the Eastern District of Kentucky), plaintiff Lori Walters brought claims against Gill Industries and several affiliates alleging breach of contract, fraud in the inducement, negligent misrepresentation, unjust enrichment, civil conspiracy and joint enterprise in connection with her employment and a promised bonus tied to the performance of a Kentucky plant.

On February 18, 2022, the court granted summary judgment in part, dismissing all claims against the majority of the named affiliates with prejudice; only the claims of breach of contract, fraud in the inducement, negligent misrepresentation and unjust enrichment remained pending against Gill Industries, Inc.
