= Hart & Cooley =

US manufacturing company

Hart & Cooley, Inc
- Hart & Cooley's Logo, Redesigned in 2013
- Industry: HVAC
- Founded: 1901
- Founder: Howard Hart and Norman Cooley
- Headquarters: Grand Rapids, Michigan, United States
- Key people: Michael C. Winn (President)
- Owner: Johnson Controls Johnson Controls
- Parent: JCI
- Website: hartandcooleyinc.com

Hart & Cooley, Inc. is an HVAC manufacturing company with plants in the United States, Mexico, and Canada. Their slogan is "Install Confidence." The home office for Hart & Cooley is in Grand Rapids, Michigan. Hart & Cooley manufactures residential and commercial products including grilles, registers and diffusers, duct system components, flexible air duct, type-b gas vent, chimneys, chimney liners, roof flashings and access doors.

== History ==
Howard Hart and Norman Cooley established the Hart & Cooley Manufacturing Company in New Britain, Connecticut in 1901. This new company became the first in the nation to manufacture warm-air registers from stamped steel. In the 1920s Hart & Cooley, Inc. made the move to Holland, Michigan, which would be the company's headquarters for almost 90 years.

During World War II, it became commonplace for many American companies to assist in production to help national efforts overseas. Hart & Cooley, Inc. ceased production of HVAC material in favor of electrical shipboard boxes and mortar shells. Production returned to normal by the end of the war.

In the second half of the century, Hart & Cooley expanded into many other products lines, including Type-B vent for gas-fired appliances, all-fuel chimney systems and flexible air ducting. Hart & Cooley Inc. celebrated its centennial anniversary in June 2001, and 6 years later moved its headquarters to Grand Rapids, MI, 30 miles northeast of Holland.

== Brands ==
Hart & Cooley, Inc. has acquired several brands in the last two decades, which include Selkirk, Portals Plus, Lima, Ward Industries, Roof Products and Systems, Milcor, and AMPCO. The Hart & Cooley logo in its present form Was introduced in 2013, by then-President Michael C. Winn who initiated the major rebranding of the company. The new Hart & Cooley logo was designed by Graphic Designer John Scianna.

== Locations ==
Hart & Cooley, Inc. has distribution centers and manufacturing facilities across North America.

=== Manufacturing facilities ===
- Huntsville, Alabama
- Mexicali, Mexico
- Nampa, Idaho
- Nobel, Ontario (Canada)
- Ojinaga, Mexico
- Olive Branch, Mississippi
- Sanger, California
- Turners Falls, Massachusetts

=== Distribution Centers ===
- Dallas, Texas
- Englewood, Ohio
- Huntsville, Alabama
- Mira Loma, California
- Prescott, Ontario (Canada)
