= Northview, Michigan =

Census-designated place & unincorporated community in Michigan, United States

- Census-designated place (CDP) & unincorporated community
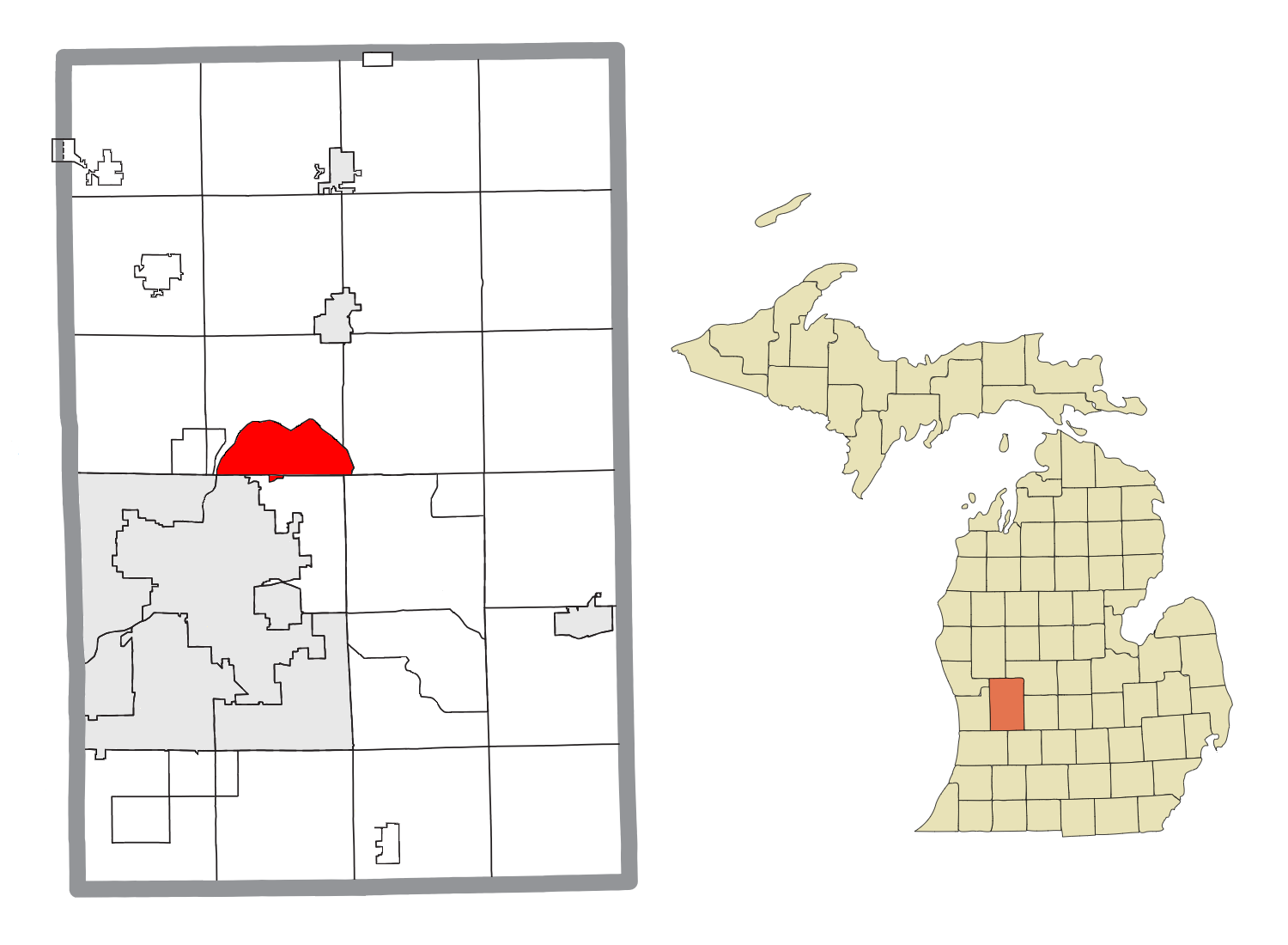
- Location within Kent County

- Location within the state of Michigan Location within the United States
- Coordinates: 43°02′20″N 85°36′48″W
- Country: United States
- State: Michigan
- County: Kent
- Townships: Grand Rapids and Plainfield

Area
  - Total: 11.01 sq mi (28.52 km^{2})
  - Land: 10.30 sq mi (26.67 km^{2})
  - Water: 0.71 sq mi (1.85 km^{2})
- Elevation: 741 ft (226 m)

Population (2020)
  - Total: 15,301
  - Density: 1,486.1/sq mi (573.78/km^{2})
- Time zone: UTC-5 (Eastern (EST))
  - Summer (DST): UTC-4 (EDT)
- ZIP code(s): 49306 (Belmont); 49525 (Grand Rapids)
- Area code: 616
- FIPS code: 26-58945
- GNIS feature ID: 1867321

Northview is an unincorporated community and census-designated place (CDP) in Kent County in the U.S. state of Michigan. The population was 15,301 at the 2020 census. The community is located mostly within Plainfield Township with a very small portion extending into Grand Rapids Township to the south.

The community is part of the Grand Rapids metropolitan area and borders the city of Grand Rapids to the south.

== Geography ==
According to the U.S. Census Bureau, the Northview CDP has a total area of 11.03 square miles (28.57 km^{2}), of which 10.33 square miles (26.75 km^{2}) is land and 0.70 square miles (1.81 km^{2}) (6.18%) is water.

The CDP is almost entirely within Plainfield Charter Township and consists of the area north of the boundary with Grand Rapids and Grand Rapids Township and south of the Grand River. It also includes a small portion of Grand Rapids Township around the southern end of Dean Lake. It is considered part of the urbanized area around Grand Rapids.

The CDP takes its name from the Northview Public Schools district, although the district includes a larger portion of Grand Rapids Township and a small area of the city of Grand Rapids.

=== Major highways ===
- M-44, known locally as Beltline Avenue, runs south–north through the center of the community. M-44 also contains a connector route within the community that links it to Interstate 96 to the south in Grand Rapids.

== Demographics ==
Historical population
Census	Pop.	Note	%±
2000	14,730		—
2010	14,541		−1.3%
2020	15,301		5.2%
U.S. Decennial Census

=== 2020 census ===
As of the 2020 census, Northview had a population of 15,301. The median age was 41.4 years. 20.6% of residents were under the age of 18 and 19.6% of residents were 65 years of age or older. For every 100 females there were 93.4 males, and for every 100 females age 18 and over there were 91.4 males age 18 and over.

98.7% of residents lived in urban areas, while 1.3% lived in rural areas.

There were 6,430 households in Northview, of which 26.6% had children under the age of 18 living in them. Of all households, 49.8% were married-couple households, 16.3% were households with a male householder and no spouse or partner present, and 27.4% were households with a female householder and no spouse or partner present. About 27.7% of all households were made up of individuals and 12.0% had someone living alone who was 65 years of age or older.

There were 6,744 housing units, of which 4.7% were vacant. The homeowner vacancy rate was 0.7% and the rental vacancy rate was 6.8%.

Racial composition as of the 2020 census
Race	Number	Percent
White	13,202	86.3%
Black or African American	546	3.6%
American Indian and Alaska Native	35	0.2%
Asian	245	1.6%
Native Hawaiian and Other Pacific Islander	6	0.0%
Some other race	208	1.4%
Two or more races	1,059	6.9%
Hispanic or Latino (of any race)	707	4.6%

=== 2000 census ===
As of the census of 2000, there were 14,730 people, 5,673 households, and 3,942 families residing in the CDP. The population density was 1,414.6 inhabitants per square mile (546.2/km^{2}). There were 5,898 housing units at an average density of 566.4 per square mile (218.7/km^{2}). The racial makeup of the CDP was 94.38% White, 1.94% African American, 0.37% Native American, 1.08% Asian, 0.08% Pacific Islander, 0.81% from other races, and 1.34% from two or more races. Hispanic or Latino of any race were 2.12% of the population.

There were 5,673 households, out of which 36.2% had children under the age of 18 living with them, 56.4% were married couples living together, 10.1% had a female householder with no husband present, and 30.5% were non-families. 25.8% of all households were made up of individuals, and 7.4% had someone living alone who was 65 years of age or older. The average household size was 2.59 and the average family size was 3.15.

In the CDP, the population was spread out, with 28.1% under the age of 18, 9.4% from 18 to 24, 28.8% from 25 to 44, 23.4% from 45 to 64, and 10.3% who were 65 years of age or older. The median age was 35 years. For every 100 females, there were 97.1 males. For every 100 females age 18 and over, there were 92.1 males.

The median income for a household in the CDP was $46,888, and the median income for a family was $54,756. Males had a median income of $41,295 versus $28,870 for females. The per capita income for the CDP was $21,215. About 4.5% of families and 6.0% of the population were below the poverty line, including 6.0% of those under age 18 and 4.9% of those age 65 or over.

== Notable residents ==
- Stacey Haiduk, actor in NBC's Heroes and seaQuest DSV
- Gary Hogeboom, former Dallas Cowboys Quarterback and Survivor: Guatemala contestant
