= Pridgeon & Clay =

- Industry: Automotive, Class 8 Heavy Truck, Agriculture, Marine, Motorcycles, Wind & Solar Energy, Fuel Cells & Batteries, Hardware & Appliances
- Founded: 1948; 78 years ago
- Founders: John Pridgeon & Donald V. Clay
- Headquarters: Grand Rapids, Michigan, United States
- Number of locations: Manufacturing Facilities in the United States, Mexico, & Hungary. Sales & Engineering Offices in the United States, Germany & China.
- Website: www.pridgeonandclay.com

Pridgeon & Clay provides metal stamping and fine-blank components, specializing in exhaust components for the automotive industry. Pridgeon & Clay also produces components for the class 8 truck, agriculture, medical, battery, fuel cell and other alternative energy industries. The company holds ISO 14001 and TS 16949 certifications, which allow the company to carry out its own product validation.

Pridgeon & Clay's Advanced Engineering Lab is an A2LA accreditation, independent testing facility. The Advanced Engineering Lab has developed new products and techniques, including patented selective catalytic reduction (SCR) mixing modules, reverse-extrusion catalytic converter cones, fuel cells and battery components for zero-emissions vehicles.

== History ==
John Pridgeon & Donald V. Clay founded the privately held company in 1948. In 1976, John Pridgeon retired from the company, leaving sole ownership to his partner Don Clay. In 1992, Don sold the business to his sons, Donald C. Clay and Robert E. Clay. Donald C. Clay retired in 2008, and Robert E. Clay remains as CEO of Pridgeon & Clay.

== Global Production ==
Pridgeon & Clay operates in four manufacturing facilities worldwide, with Sales & Engineering offices in North America, Europe & China. The company has over 95 stamping presses worldwide ranging from 40 to 1500 tons, plus other manufacturing equipment to execute a variety of production services:

- Fine Blanking
- In-die Sensoring & both Robotic MIG and Resistance Welding
- Progressive Die, Transfer Press, and Deep Drawn Stamping

=== United States ===
Pridgeon & Clay operates two locations in the United States, in Michigan and Indiana. The Grand Rapids, Michigan location houses the head office, a 350,000-square-foot (33,000 m^{2}) manufacturing plant, a 103,000-square-foot (9,600 m^{2}) distribution center, and a 32,000-square-foot (3,000 m^{2}) Research & Development and Advanced Engineering facility. As the main production facility, Grand Rapids runs over 70 presses ranging from 40 tons to 1500 tons with customized steel feed systems that accommodate rolled coils or flat blanks. The 74,000-square-foot (6,900 m^{2}) manufacturing plant in Franklin, Indiana specializes in lighter gauge stamping up to 400 tons, plus MIG and resistance welding, tube cut-off, sizing, and forming. Pridgeon & Clay closed the Franklin plant in 2024.

=== Hungary ===
Acquired by Pridgeon & Clay in 2001, the Apostag facility has over 107,000 square feet (9,900 m^{2}) of manufacturing space. Located less than 80 kilometers south of Budapest, Pridgeon & Clay, KFT manufactures metal stampings and tooling for the automotive industry with progressive and transfer presses up to 800 tons. The facility is TS-16949 Certified.

=== Mexico ===
Pridgeon & Clay's Mexico facility is located in Monterrey, Mexico, just 15 km from Monterrey International Airport, and just 200 km from the USA Texas border. P &C Mex offers progressive metal stamping on multiple presses up to 1,000 tons. Press bed sizes are as large as 4.6 meters (180 inches). The facility is TS-16949 Certified.

=== Germany and China ===
Pridgeon & Clay also opened sales and engineering offices in Germany and Shanghai, China in 2007.
