= Walker, Michigan =

- City
- City of Walker
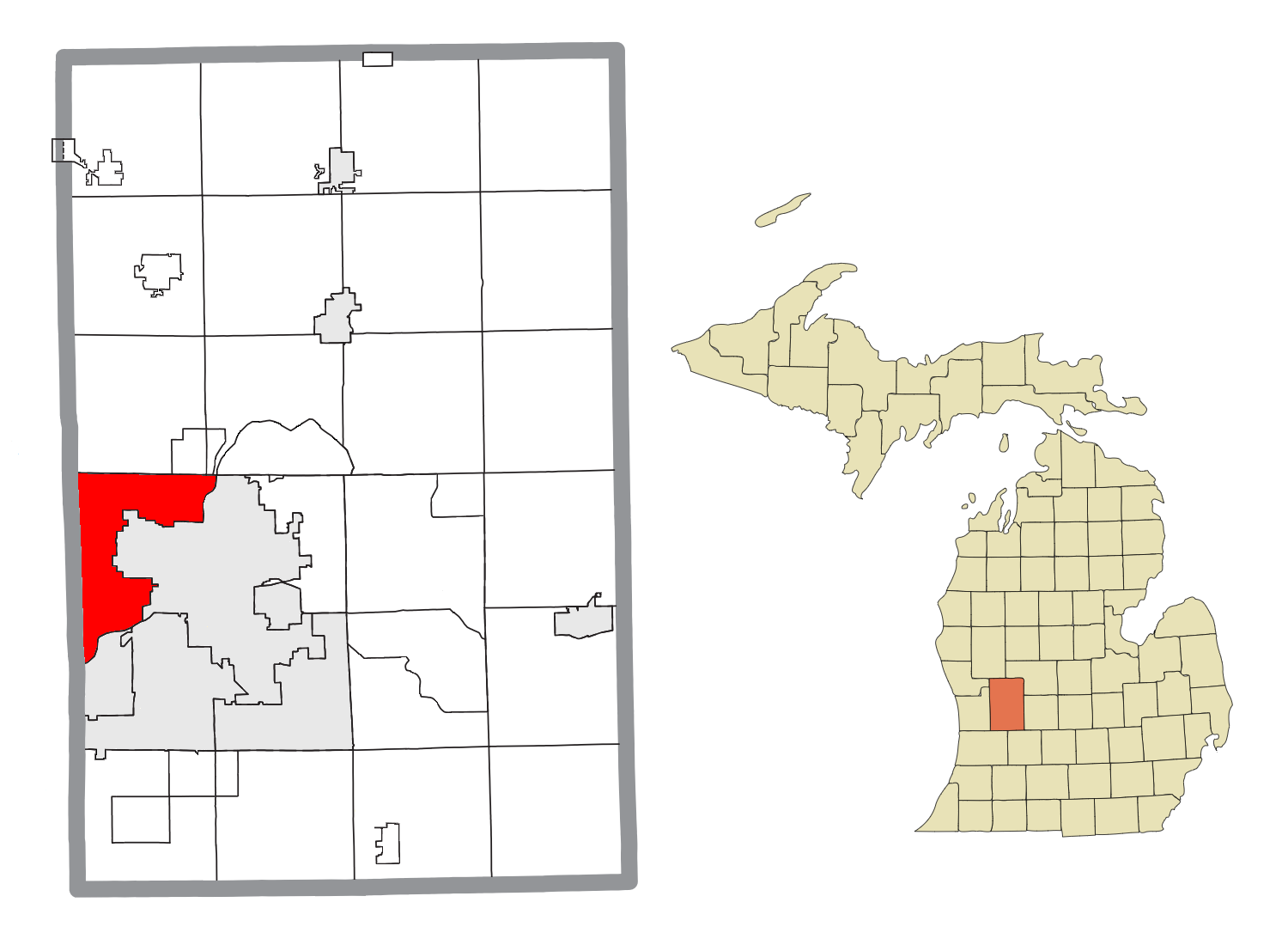
- Location within Kent County

- Location within the state of Michigan Location within the United States
- Coordinates: 43°00′52″N 85°41′33″W
- Country: United States
- State: Michigan
- County: Kent
- Established: 1837 (Walker Township)
- Incorporated: 1962

Government
  - Type: City commission
  - Mayor: Gary Carey, Jr.
  - Clerk: Sarah Bydalek
  - Manager: Darrel Schmalzel
  - Commission: Commissioners: Steven Gilbert; Thom Burke; Roxanne Deschaine; Carol Glanville; Melanie Grooters; Elaina Huizenga-Chase

Area
  - Total: 25.14 sq mi (65.12 km^{2})
  - Land: 24.58 sq mi (63.66 km^{2})
  - Water: 0.57 sq mi (1.47 km^{2})
- Elevation: 709 ft (216 m)

Population (2020)
  - Total: 25,132
  - Density: 1,022.6/sq mi (394.81/km^{2})
- Time zone: UTC-5 (Eastern (EST))
  - Summer (DST): UTC-4 (EDT)
- ZIP code(s): 49534, 49544 (Grand Rapids) (Note: The city is served by the 49534 and 49544 ZIP Codes, which are designated as Grand Rapids, although Walker is also an approved name for mailing purposes for both.)
- Area code: 616
- FIPS code: 26-82960
- GNIS feature ID: 1627209
- Website: Official website

Walker is a city in Kent County in the U.S. state of Michigan. A suburb of Grand Rapids, Walker borders the city to the north and west. As of the 2020 census, the city had a population of 25,132.

Walker was originally organized as Walker Township in 1837 and later incorporated as a city in 1962. It is home to the headquarters of Meijer and Bissell.

== History ==
The area was first organized as Walker Township on December 30, 1837, the second to be organized in Kent County. It initially comprised all of the land in the county north of the Grand River. Shortly thereafter in 1838, part of the township was split off to form Ada Township. The earliest settlers of the township were Canadian immigrants. In 1867, a township hall was built. However, the area where the township hall was annexed into Grand Rapids in 1959.

Walker was established as a city in 1962 to prevent further annexation of the area into Grand Rapids. At the time it was made a city, Walker had a population of 11,000.

The city gained national attention when Gwendolyn Graham and Cathy Wood committed their murders as workers at a nursing home in Walker in 1987.

In the late 1990s, a shopping mall was proposed by a developer based in Ada near the intersection of Four Mile Road and Walker, though this was opposed by residents who believed it would cause nearby students to skip school, increase crime with gang activity and that it may fail due to the upcoming opening of RiverTown Crossings.

== Geography ==
According to the U.S. Census Bureau, the city has a total area of 25.14 square miles (65.11 km^{2}), of which 24.58 square miles (63.66 km^{2}) is land and 0.57 square miles (1.48 km^{2}) (2.27%) is water.

=== Major highways ===
- I-96 runs along the north side of the city.
- US 131 passes briefly through the northeastern part of the city.
- M-11 (Wilson Avenue and Remembrance Drive) runs south–north through the western edge of the city.
- M-37 (Alpine Avenue) enters from the north of the city and then runs concurrently with I-96.
- M-45 (Lake Michigan Drive) runs west–east briefly through the center of the city.

== Government ==
The city of Walker operates with a City commission government, with six elected officials serving on a commission plus an appointed city manager. The city government is represented by three wards, each with two elected commissioners, which are overseen by an elected mayor.

The city levies an income tax of 1% on residents and 0.5% on nonresidents.

== Media ==
=== Newspaper ===
- The Grand Rapids Press had its printing and distribution facility in Walker. The facility closed October 5, 2020 and printing operations were consolidated to Cleveland, Ohio.

=== Television ===
- WZZM 13 is located in Walker.
- WXSP-CD 15 broadcast tower is located in Walker.

=== Radio ===
- WTRV 100.5 MHz is licensed to Walker. However, the studio is located in downtown Grand Rapids.

== Education ==
=== Public schools ===
School districts serving the City of Walker include Comstock Park Public Schools, Grand Rapids Public Schools, Grandville Public Schools, and Kenowa Hills Public Schools.

Kenowa Hills schools in the Walker city limits include the Kenowa Hills Early Childhood Center/Day Care & Learning Center, (previously Walker Station Elementary School) Kenowa Hills Central Elementary School, (formerly Kenowa Hills Intermediate School) and Zinser Elementary School. The district previously operated Fairview Elementary School in Walker. Kenowa Hills district residents are zoned to Kenowa Hills Middle School and Kenowa Hills High School in Alpine Township.

One Grandville school, Cummings Elementary, is in the city limits.

One National Heritage Academies charter school, Walker Charter Academy, is in the city limits.

=== Private schools ===
Covenant Christian High School and Hope Protestant Reformed Christian School are located in Walker.

=== Public libraries ===
The Kent District Library Walker Branch is in Walker.

== Sports ==
The DeltaPlex Arena was an event arena within Walker and was home to the Grand Rapids Gold of the NBA G League, which is an affiliate of the Denver Nuggets. The Delta Plex closed and is now mixed use commercial facility and the Grand Rapids Gold play home games at the Van Andel Arena

== Demographics ==
Historical population
Census	Pop.	Note	%±
1970	11,492		—
1980	15,088		31.3%
1990	17,279		14.5%
2000	21,842		26.4%
2010	23,537		7.8%
2020	25,132		6.8%
U.S. Decennial Census

=== 2020 census ===
As of the 2020 census, Walker had a population of 25,132. The median age was 35.6 years. 21.0% of residents were under the age of 18 and 15.1% of residents were 65 years of age or older. For every 100 females there were 96.8 males, and for every 100 females age 18 and over there were 95.2 males age 18 and over.

94.5% of residents lived in urban areas, while 5.5% lived in rural areas.

There were 10,470 households in Walker, of which 25.8% had children under the age of 18 living in them. Of all households, 46.1% were married-couple households, 19.8% were households with a male householder and no spouse or partner present, and 25.9% were households with a female householder and no spouse or partner present. About 31.6% of all households were made up of individuals and 10.4% had someone living alone who was 65 years of age or older.

There were 10,797 housing units, of which 3.0% were vacant. The homeowner vacancy rate was 0.6% and the rental vacancy rate was 3.7%.

Racial composition as of the 2020 census
Race	Number	Percent
White	21,222	84.4%
Black or African American	923	3.7%
American Indian and Alaska Native	114	0.5%
Asian	705	2.8%
Native Hawaiian and Other Pacific Islander	6	0.0%
Some other race	629	2.5%
Two or more races	1,533	6.1%
Hispanic or Latino (of any race)	1,551	6.2%

=== 2010 census ===
As of the census of 2010, there were 23,537 people, 9,684 households, and 5,923 families living in the city. The population density was 943.7 inhabitants per square mile (364.4/km^{2}). There were 10,432 housing units at an average density of 418.3 per square mile (161.5/km^{2}). The racial makeup of the city was 91.3% White, 2.8% African American, 0.5% Native American, 1.9% Asian, 1.4% from other races, and 2.1% from two or more races. Hispanic or Latino residents of any race were 4.1% of the population.

There were 9,684 households, of which 29.3% had children under the age of 18 living with them, 47.8% were married couples living together, 9.7% had a female householder with no husband present, 3.7% had a male householder with no wife present, and 38.8% were non-families. 30.5% of all households were made up of individuals, and 8.6% had someone living alone who was 65 years of age or older. The average household size was 2.40 and the average family size was 3.05.

The median age in the city was 34.6 years. 22.9% of residents were under the age of 18; 12.9% were between the ages of 18 and 24; 26.7% were from 25 to 44; 25.3% were from 45 to 64; and 12.1% were 65 years of age or older. The gender makeup of the city was 48.7% male and 51.3% female.

=== 2000 census ===
As of the census of 2000, there were 21,842 people, 8,805 households, and 5,379 families living in the city. The population density was 868.3 inhabitants per square mile (335.3/km^{2}). There were 9,201 housing units at an average density of 365.8 per square mile (141.2/km^{2}). The racial makeup of the city was 94.51% White, 1.47% African American, 0.46% Native American, 0.98% Asian, 0.04% Pacific Islander, 1.09% from other races, and 1.45% from two or more races. Hispanic or Latino residents of any race were 2.75% of the population.

There were 8,805 households, out of which 30.9% had children under the age of 18 living with them, 50.0% were married couples living together, 7.9% had a female householder with no husband present, and 38.9% were non-families. 30.2% of all households were made up of individuals, and 7.1% had someone living alone who was 65 years of age or older. The average household size was 2.45 and the average family size was 3.14.

In the city, 25.9% was under the age of 18, 12.4% from 18 to 24, 32.1% from 25 to 44, 19.1% from 45 to 64, and 10.6% whas 65 years of age or older. The median age was 32 years. For every 100 females, there were 97.7 males. For every 100 females age 18 and over, there were 94.9 males.

The median income for a household in the city was $44,818, and the median income for a family was $58,912. Males had a median income of $37,438 versus $28,372 for females. The per capita income for the city was $21,198. About 3.1% of families and 6.1% of the population were below the poverty line, including 4.0% of those under age 18 and 8.9% of those age 65 or over.

== Sister city ==
- Walker is the sister city of Colac, Victoria in Australia.
