= Kenowa Hills High School =

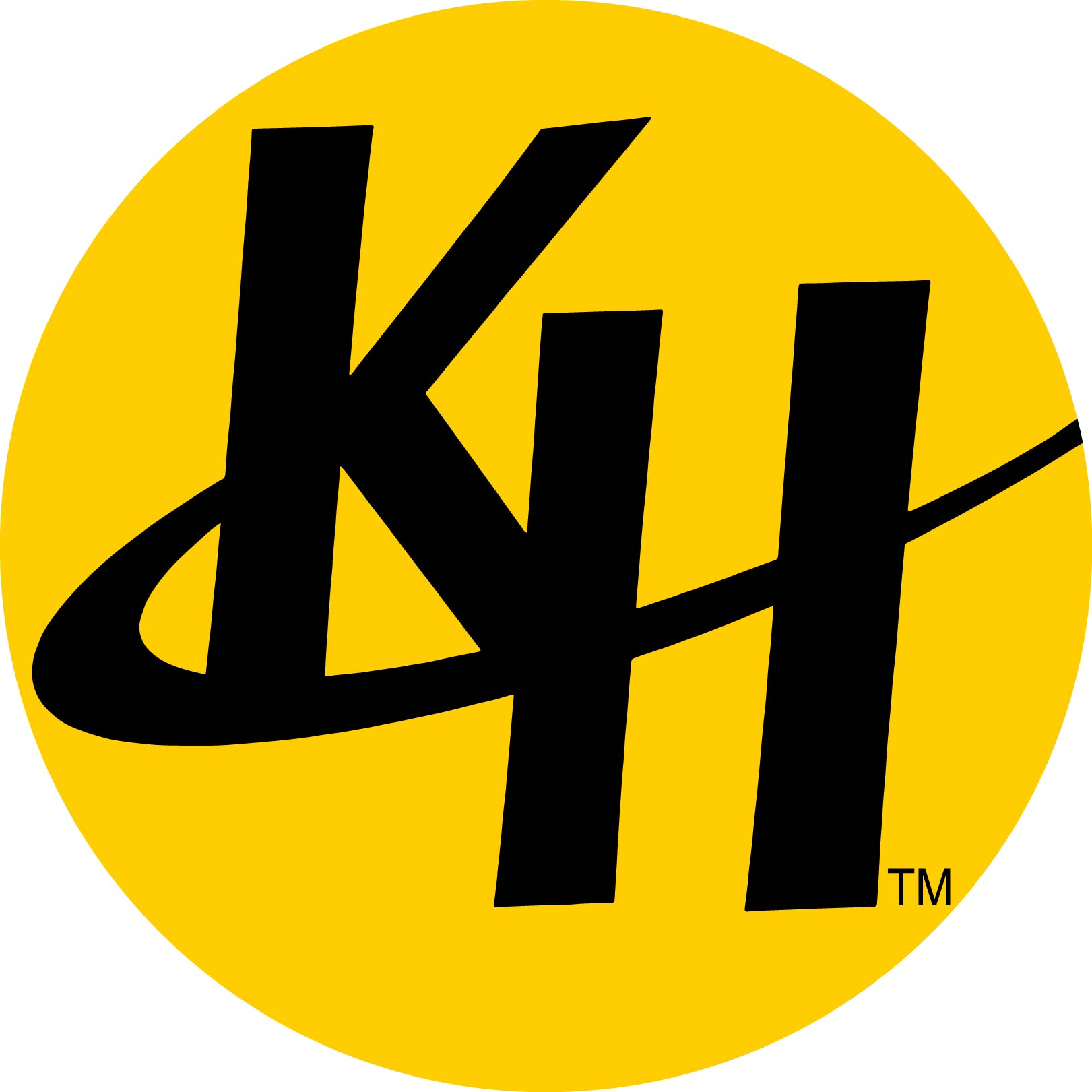

Location
- 3825 Hendershot Avenue NW; Grand Rapids, Michigan 49544; United States; 43°01′58″N 85°44′59″W

Information
- Type: Public secondary school
- Motto: Education Inspired
- Established: 1995; 31 years ago
- School district: Kenowa Hills Public Schools
- NCES District ID: 2620280
- Superintendent: Gerald Hopkins
- CEEB code: 231716
- NCES School ID: 262028005702
- Principal: Nathan Robrahn
- Teaching staff: 51.10 (FTE)
- Grades: 9 to 12
- Enrollment: 886 (2023–2024)
- Student to teacher ratio: 17.34
- Colors: Black and gold
- Athletics conference: River Cities Alliance
- Nickname: Knights
- Website: khps.org/kenowa-hills-high-school

Kenowa Hills High School is a public secondary school in Alpine Township, Michigan, U.S. (near Grand Rapids). It serves grades 9-12 for the Kenowa Hills Public Schools district.

== Academics ==
In the 2022 U.S. News & World Report annual survey of US high schools, Kenowa Hills ranked 193rd in Michigan and 5,768th nationally.

== Demographics ==
The demographic breakdown of the 951 students enrolled for the 2022–2023 school year was:

- Male - 51.4%
- Female - 48.6%
- Native American/Alaskan - 0.4%
- Asian - 1.7%
- Black - 4.7%
- Hispanic - 16.9%
- Native Hawaiian/Pacific islander - 0.1%
- White - 71.3%
- Multiracial - 4.8%

47.1% of the students were eligible for free or reduced-cost lunch.

== Athletics ==
The Kenowa Hills Knights compete in the River Cities Alliance. School colors are black and gold. The following Michigan High School Athletic Association (MHSAA) sanctioned sports are offered:

- Baseball (boys)
- Basketball (girls and boys)
- Bowling (girls and boys)
- Competitive cheer (girls)
- Cross country (girls and boys)
- Football (boys)
  - 2nd place in state tournament - 1992
- Golf (girls and boys)
- Gymnastics (girls)
- Ice hockey (boys)
- Lacrosse (boys)
- Soccer (girls and boys)
- Softball (girls)
- Swim and dive (girls and boys)
- Tennis (girls and boys)
- Track and field (girls and boys)
- Volleyball (girls)
- Wrestling (boys)

== Notable alumni ==
- Donavan Brazier (2015) - track & field athlete, 2019 World Champion in the 800m
