= List of Michigan State Historic Sites in Kent County =

Location of Kent County in Michigan

The following is a list of Michigan State Historic Sites in Kent County, Michigan. Sites marked with a dagger (†) are also listed on the National Register of Historic Places in Kent County, Michigan.

== Current listings ==
Name	Image	Location	City	Listing date
126th Infantry Informational Designation	126th Infantry	Grand Valley Armory, 1200 44th Street, SW	Wyoming	August 20, 1992
Ada Covered Bridge†		Across the Thornapple River at Bronson Street	Ada	May 9, 1969
Alpine Center Cemetery	Alpine Cemetery	2382 Seven Mile Road, NW, at the corner of Walker Avenue	Comstock Park	December 20, 1990
Alpine Township Hall	Alpine Township Hall	SE corner of 7 Mile Rd and Walker Rd, NW	Alpine	June 10, 1987
Mathias Alten Home and Studio†	Mathias Alten Home & Studio	1593 Fulton SE	Grand Rapids	September 1, 2006
Alton Pioneer Village Informational Designation	Alton Pioneer Village	Intersection of 3 Mile and Lincoln Lake roads	Vergennes Township	July 21, 1988
Aquinas College Informational Designation	Aquinas College	1607 Robinson Road, SE	Grand Rapids	April 18, 1962
Bailey House	Bailey House-Kentwood	3180 Paris	Kentwood	February 21, 1975
Baw-Wa-Ting Informational Designation	Baw-Wa-Ting	240 W. Fulton	Grand Rapids	February 21, 2004
John W. and Minnie Cumnock Blodgett Estate†	Blodgett Estate	250 Plymouth Road, SE	East Grand Rapids	December 8, 1977
Bowne Township District No. 1 School	Bowne Township District No. 1 School	9402 Alden Nash Avenue SE	Alto	July 15, 1999
Bowne Township Hall	Bowne Township Hall	8307 Alden Nash Avenue, near 84th Street	Bowne Township	April 10, 1986
Boy Scout Troop No. 15 / Eagle Scout Gerald "Junior" Ford Informational Designation	Boy Scout Troop 15	1100 Lake Drive SE	Grand Rapids	April 21, 2017
Barber Briggs House	Barber Briggs House	2420 Plainfield Avenue NE	Grand Rapids	April 21, 1980
Byron Township Hall	Byron Township Hall	2406 Prescott SW	Byron Center	September 26, 1987
Calvin College and Seminary	Calvin College	Calvin College campus, 3205 Burton St, just west of M-37 (Beltline Ave)	Grand Rapids	January 16, 1962
Louis Campau Informational Designation		St. Andrews Cemetery, Madison and Prince streets, SE	Grand Rapids	August 22, 1985
Cannon Township Hall	Cannon Township Hall	8045 Cannonsburg Road	Cannonsburg	October 23, 1987
Cannon Township Methodist Episcopal Church	Cannon Township Methodist Episcopal Church	12047 Old Belding Road	Grattan Township	August 22, 1985
Cascade Christian Church	Cascade Christian Church	Orange Street, near intersection of Cascade Rd and 28th St	Cascade Township	November 2, 1980
Cascade Township Hall	Cascade Township Hall	2839 Thornapple River Drive	Cascade Township	October 17, 1996
The Castle	The Crofton Castle	455 Cherry Street SE	Grand Rapids	July 24, 1979
Central High School	Central High School-Grand Rapids	421 Fountain St NE	Grand Rapids	September 4, 1997
Central Reformed Church Informational Designation	Central Reformed Church-Grand Rapids	10 College Avenue, NE	Grand Rapids	November 20, 1987
John Isaac Cutler House	John Issac Cutler House	300 68th Street, SE	Cutlerville	July 21, 1988
Eagle Scout Gerald R. Ford Informational Designation	Eagle Scout-Ford	1100 Lake Dr.	Grand Rapids	April 21, 2017
Engine House No. 6	Engine House No. 6	312 Grandville Avenue SW	Grand Rapids	May 4, 1977
Fallasburg Covered Bridge†		Covered Bridge Road, E of Fallasburg Park Road, over the Flat River	Lowell vicinity	February 12, 1959
Fallasburg Pioneer Village†	Fallsburg Historic District	Covered Bridge Road	Lowell vicinity	August 22, 1985
Fallasburg School	Fallasburg School	Covered Bridge Road	Lowell vicinity	April 23, 1985
John Wesley Fallass House	John Wesley Fallass House	13893 Covered Bridge Road	Lowell vicinity	October 23, 1986
First (Park) Congregational Church†	First(Park)CongregationalChurchGrandRapidsMI	10 Park Place NE	Grand Rapids	November 2, 1980
James O. Fitch House	James Fitch House	39 Fitch Street, SE	Grand Rapids	February 18, 1982
President Gerald R. Ford, Jr. Boyhood Home†	President Gerald R. Ford, Jr. Boyhood Home	649 Union Avenue SE	Grand Rapids	December 15, 1994
Fractional District No. 9 School of Algoma and Sparta Township	Fractional District No. 9 School	16 Thirteen Mile Road	Sparta	December 17, 1992
Furniture Industry Informational Designation	Furniture Industry	Located at the Grand Rapids Public Museum, 272 Pearl Street NW	Grand Rapids	January 19, 1957
German English School Association (German-American School Society)		327 Front Avenue NW	Grand Rapids	July 26, 1978
Graham House†	Graham House - Lowell	323-325 Main Street	Lowell	June 19, 1971
Grand Rapids and Indiana Railroad Culvert	GR and Indiana Railroad Culvert	11101 Summit Ave.	Rockford	September 4, 1996
Grand Rapids Firsts		Campau Square, Monroe Avenue and Pearl Street	Grand Rapids	August 23, 1956
Heritage Hill Historic District†	Heritage Hill 2	Bounded by Michigan Avenue on the north, Pleasant Street on the south, Union Avenue on the east, and on the West by Clarendon Place, Jefferson Avenue, and Lafayette Avenue	Grand Rapids	March 3, 1971}
The Herkimer	Herkimer Hotel	323 South Division Avenue	Grand Rapids	April 24, 1981
Henry Holt House	Henry Holt House	2000 Thornapple River Drive, SE	Grand Rapids	February 7, 1977
Hyser House	Hyser House	6440 West River Road, W of Northland Dr and the Rogue River	Belmont vicinity	February 23, 1978
David Kinsey Home	David Kinsey Home	6087 100th Street, West of Kinsey Boulevard	Caledonia	November 3, 1976
Erastus U. Knapp House	Erastus Knapp House	1330 Knapp, NE	Grand Rapids	May 18, 1989
La Framboise Trading Post	La Framboise Trading Post	Stoney Lakeside Park 1200 Bowes St. SE	Lowell vicinity	August 23, 1956
Ladies' Literary Club†	LadiesLiteraryClubGrandRapidsMI	61 Sheldon Boulevard SE	Grand Rapids	May 18, 1971
Little Red Schoolhouse	Little Red Schoolhouse - Rockford	E Division Street, 300 feet west of Wolverine Boulevard	Rockford	May 4, 1966
Loraine Building†	LoraineBuildingGrandRapidsMI	124 East Fulton Street	Grand Rapids	September 17, 1981
Masonic Temple	Masonic Temple-GR	233 East Fulton Street	Grand Rapids	April 24, 1981
McCabe-Marlowe House	James Gallop House	74 Lafayette, NE	Grand Rapids	April 24, 1981
Meijer Thrifty Acres	Meijer Thrifty Acres	1540 28th St. SE	Grand Rapids	June 29, 2015
Meyer May House	Meyer May House, south side, 2009	450 Madison Avenue SE	Grand Rapids	October 23, 1986
McKenney School	McKenney School	84th Street at Homerich	Byron Center	November 16, 1981
Monroe Avenue Water Filtration Plant†		1430 Monroe Avenue NW	Grand Rapids	March 16, 1989
Moseley School	Moseley School - Vergennes Twnshp	Southeast corner of Lincoln Lake Road and Four Mile Road	Vergennes Township	August 22, 1985
Orlando Odell House	Orlando Odell House	10629 Bailey Drive	Lowell	June 20, 1985
Orlin Douglass Farm	Orlen Douglas Farm	13923 Covered Bridge Road	Vergennes Township	May 10, 1990
Pantlind Hotel	:Pantlind Hotel	187 Monroe Avenue, NW	Grand Rapids	May 4, 1977
Abram W. Pike House†	AbramWPikeHouseGrandRapidsMI	230 Fulton Street	Grand Rapids	February 19, 1958
Pine Island Dr. Bridge	Pine Island Dr. Bridge	8900 Pine Island Dr. NE	Comstock Park	March 16, 2012
Plainfield District No. 3 School	Plainfield District No. 3 School	3992 Kroes Street on the southwest corner of Brewer and Kroes Street	Rockford	October 17, 1996
Porter Hollow Embankment and Culvert†	Porter Hollow Embankment and Culvert	Summit Avenue at Stegman Creek	Rockford	October 17, 1996
Rauser Sausage Factory	Rauser Sausage Building	645 Bridge Street, NW	Grand Rapids	May 4, 1977
Paul H. Richens House	Paul Richens House	427 James Avenue SE	Grand Rapids	December 19, 1984
Riverside Hotel	Riverside Hotel	3965 West River Road, NE	Grand Rapids	June 10, 1980
Saint Andrew's Cemetery	St. Andrew Cemetery	900 Madison Avenue SE	Grand Rapids	September 21, 1988
Saint Cecilia Society Building†	St. Cecilla Building	Lot 1 except the S 5 ft and lot 2 except the N 18.19 ft, Block 30	Grand Rapids	March 3, 1971
Saint Mark's Episcopal Church	St. Marks Church-Grand Rapids	134 North Division Street	Grand Rapids	November 14, 1974
Maurice Shanahan House	Maurice Shanahan House	1330 Plainfield Avenue	Grand Rapids	September 21, 1988
Sixth Street Bridge†	Sixth Street Bridge, Grand Rapids	Over the Grand River connecting Newberry St NW and Sixth Street NW	Grand Rapids	June 18, 1976
Slater's Mission Informational Site		Front Avenue and Douglas Street	Grand Rapids	August 23, 1956
Sparta Carnegie Library	Sparta Carnegie Library	80 N. Union	Sparta	June 23, 1983
Ransom L. Spaulding House	Ranson Spaulding House	2180 Spaulding Avenue	Grand Rapids	July 20, 1989
Benjamin-Springs House	Benjamin- Springs House	2359 Madison Ave. SE	Grand Rapids	August 8, 2017
Steamboats on the Grand River		Roadside Park on M-21	Grand Rapids vicinity	February 12, 1959
Toledo, Saginaw and Muskegon Railroad Depot	Toledo, Saginaw and Muskegon Railroad Depot	N. Union Street	Sparta	May 10, 1990
Eliphalet H. Turner House†	Turner House-Grand Rapids	731Front Avenue NW	Grand Rapids	April 24, 1970
U.S. Post Office†	USPostOfficeGrandRapidsMI	17 Pearl Street NW	Grand Rapids	February 21, 1975
Union Benevolent Association Hospital and Nurses' Lodge		1840 Wealthy, SE	East Grand Rapids	April 28, 1987
Valley City Milling Company Informational Designation		Off Front St near Grand Rapids & Indiana Railroad "Blue" Bridge	Grand Rapids	October 27, 1983
Arthur H. Vandenberg / Vandenberg Center	Arthur H. Vandenberg	1 Vandenberg Center	Grand Rapids	July 23, 1987
Vergennes District No. 1 Schoolhouse	Vergennes District No. 1 School	12980 Three Mile Road	Lowell	September 25, 1985
Vergennes District No. 11 Schoolhouse	Vergennes District No. 11 Schoolhouse	1573 Parnell, NE	Lowell	April 23, 1985
Vergennes United Methodist Church	Vergennes United Methodist Church	NE corner of Bailey and Parnell roads	Lowell vicinity	January 19, 1978
Veterans' Facility		3000 Monroe Avenue NW	Grand Rapids	July 23, 1985
Villa Maria†	Villa Maria-GR	1315 Walker Avenue NW	Grand Rapids	December 15, 1988
Carl G.A. Voigt House	Voight House	115 College SE	Grand Rapids	February 22, 1974
Zenas Winsor-Henry C. Smith House	Zenas Winsor - Henry Smith House	3290 Rogue River Road	Belmont	October 23, 1986

== See also ==
- National Register of Historic Places listings in Kent County, Michigan

== Sources ==
- Historic Sites Online – Kent County. Michigan State Housing Developmental Authority. Accessed March 7, 2011.
