= Sixth Street Bridge =

Sixth Street Bridge may refer to:

- Sixth Street Viaduct, bridge in Los Angeles
- Sixth Street Bridge (Pittsburgh, Pennsylvania)
- Sixth Street Bridge (Grand Rapids, Michigan)
- Sixth Street Railroad Bridge, between Parkersburg, West Virginia, and Belpre, Ohio
- West Sixth Street Bridge in Austin, Texas
