= Rockford High School (Michigan) =

Public secondary school in Kent County, Michigan

Location
- 4100 Kroes Street; Rockford, Michigan 49341; United States; 43°5′31″N 85°33′53″W

Information
- Type: Public high school
- School district: Rockford Public Schools
- Superintendent: Steven Matthews
- CEEB code: 233205
- NCES School ID: 263003006588
- Principal: Ricky Clark
- Teaching staff: 91.08 (FTE)
- Grades: 10-12
- Enrollment: 1,823 (2023–2024)
- Student to teacher ratio: 20.02
- Colors: Black and orange
- Athletics conference: Ottawa-Kent Conference
- Nickname: Rams
- Feeder schools: North Rockford Middle; East Rockford Middle
- Website: www.rockfordschools.org/schools/high-schools/rockford-high-school/

Student assessments
- 2021–22 school year Change vs. prior year

M-STEP 11th grade proficiency rates (Science / Social Studies)
- Advanced %: 18.9 / 14.3
- Proficient %: 30.1 / 31.5
- PR. Proficient %: 14.6 / 40.5
- Not Proficient %: 36.4 / 13.7

Average test scores
- SAT Total: 1078.2 (▲ +18.3)

Rockford High School in Rockford, Michigan services grades 10-12 for the Rockford Public Schools. The freshman center is next door at 4500 Kroes Street. The current high school was built in 1992.

The Rockford Marching Band, the largest competitive band in the state of Michigan, performed at the 1986 and 2023 Rose Parade in Pasadena, California.

== Demographics ==
The demographic breakdown of the 1,878 students enrolled in 2013-14 was:

- Male - 52.3%
- Female - 47.7%
- Native American/Alaskan - 0.1%
- Asian/Pacific islanders - 1.8%
- Black - 0.8%
- Hispanic - 3.2%
- White - 91.3%
- Multiracial - 2.8%

8.5% of the students were eligible for free or reduced lunch.

== Athletics ==
The Rockford Rams compete in the Ottawa-Kent Conference. The school colors are orange and black. The following sports are offered:

- Baseball (boys)
  - State champion - 2011
- Basketball (girls & boys)
  - Boys state champion - 2003, 2026
  - Girls State Champion - 2023
- Bowling (girls & boys)
- Competitive cheer (girls)
- Cross country (girls & boys)
  - Boys state champion - 2000, 2002, 2014, 2015
  - Girls state champion - 1998, 1999, 2000, 2001, 2002
- Equestrian*
- E-sports
- Football (boys)
  - State champion - 2004, 2005, 2008
- Golf (girls & boys)
- Gymnastics (girls)
  - State champion - 1989
- Ice hockey (boys)
- Lacrosse (girls & boys)
  - Girls state champion - 2010, 2013, 2014, 2015, 2016, 2017, 2018, 2019
- Powerlifting (girls & boys)***
- Rowing (girls & boys)

Rugby-2022 State Champion

  - Boys National champion - 2016
  - Girls State champion - 2011, 2012, 2013, 2017, 2018
- Skiing (girls & boys)
- Soccer (girls & boys)
- Softball (girls)
- Swimming and diving (girls & boys)
  - Boys state champion - 2001
  - Girls state champion - 2017
- Tennis (girls & boys)
- Track and field (girls & boys)
  - Girls state champion - 2000, 2003
- Volleyball (girls)
  - State champion - 2011
- Water polo** (girls & boys)
  - Boys state champion - 2000, 2003, 2004, 2005, 2006, 2007, 2009, 2010, 2012, 2013, 2014, 2016, 2017
  - Girls state champion - 2004, 2006, 2008, 2012
- Wrestling (boys)
  - State champion - 2007, 2009

*Equestrian events are sanctioned by the Michigan Interscholastic Horsemanship Association (MIHA).

**Water polo is sanctioned by the Michigan Water Polo Association (MWPA).

***Co-ed Powerlifting is sanctioned by the Michigan High School Powerlifting Association (MHSPLA).

All other events are sanctioned by the MHSAA.

== Notable alumni ==
- Brent Bookwalter - professional cyclist
- Ben Braden - NFL player
- Parker Ehinger - National Football League (NFL) offensive lineman
- Jason Hartmann - long distance runner
- Adam Kieft - NFL offensive lineman
- Dominic Prichard - Chemist
- Dathan Ritzenhein - long distance runner
- Joe Staley - NFL offensive tackle
- Ginger Zee - television meteorologist
