= Cannon Township, Michigan =

Township in Michigan, United States

- Civil township
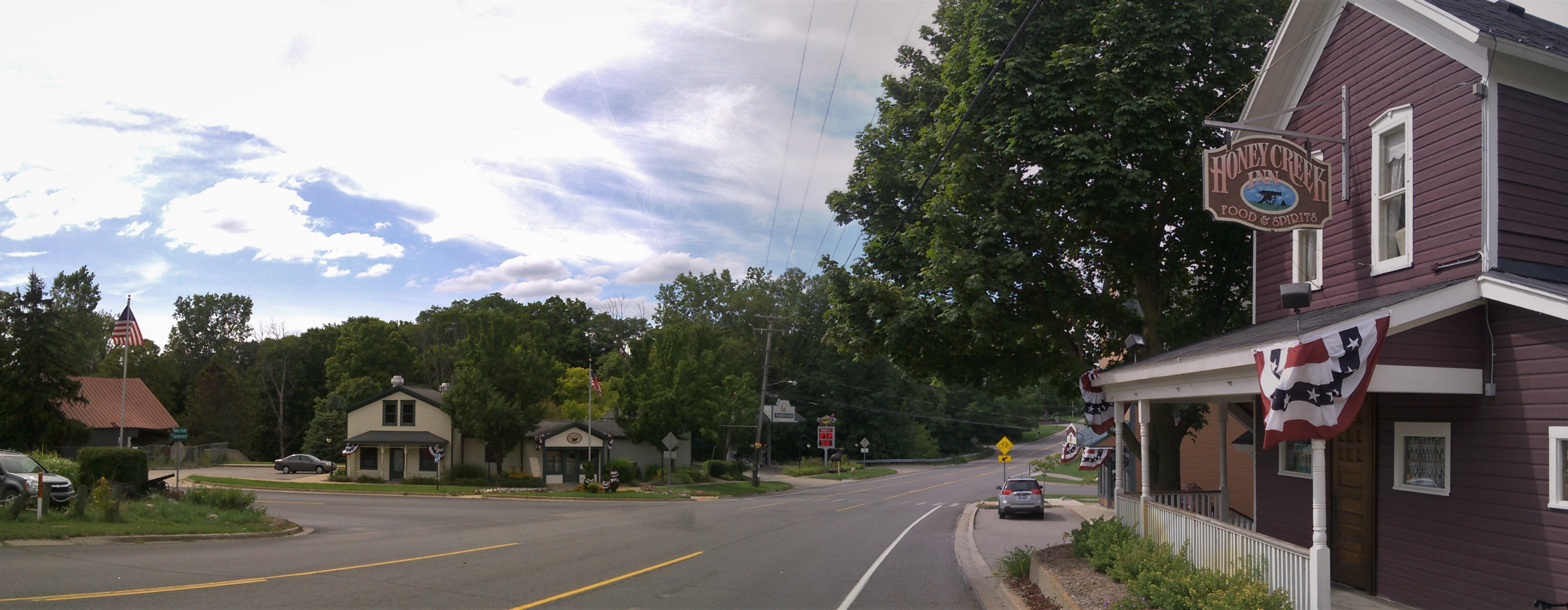
- Unincorporated community of Cannonsburg

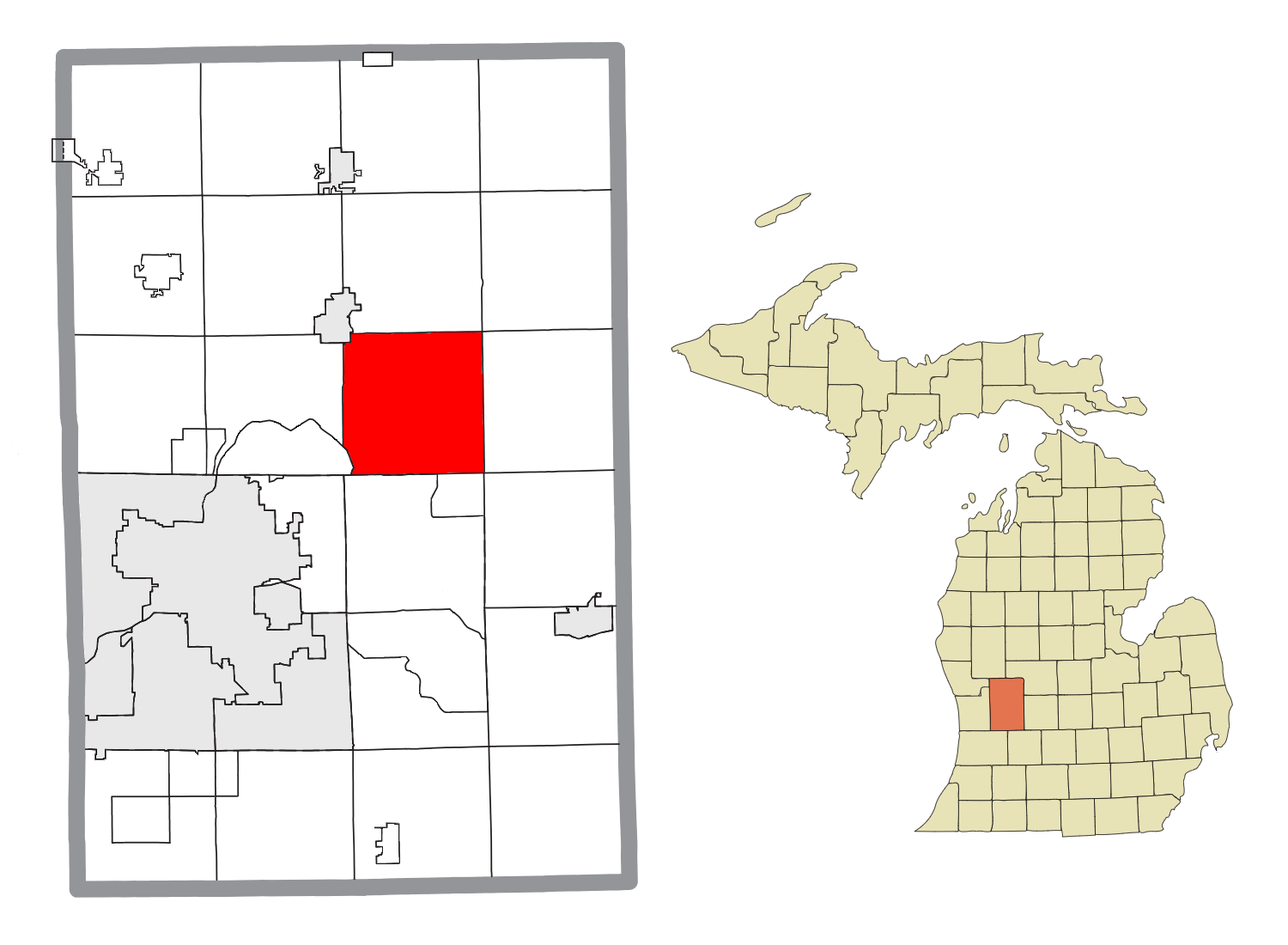
- Location within Kent County

- Location within the state of Michigan Location within the United States
- Coordinates: 43°04′10″N 85°29′16″W
- Country: United States
- State: Michigan
- County: Kent
- Established: 1845

Government
  - Supervisor: Stephen Grimm
  - Clerk: Jim Alles

Area
  - Total: 36.97 sq mi (95.8 km^{2})
  - Land: 35.26 sq mi (91.3 km^{2})
  - Water: 1.71 sq mi (4.4 km^{2})
- Elevation: 843 ft (257 m)

Population (2020)
  - Total: 14,379
  - Density: 378.2/sq mi (146.0/km^{2})
- Time zone: UTC-5 (Eastern (EST))
  - Summer (DST): UTC-4 (EDT)
- ZIP code(s): 49301 (Ada); 49306 (Belmont); 49317 (Cannonsburg); 49341 (Rockford)
- Area code: 616
- FIPS code: 26-081-13080
- GNIS feature ID: 1626029
- Website: Official website

Cannon Township is a civil township of Kent County in the U.S. state of Michigan. The population was 13,336 at the 2010 census.

The township was organized as a survey township in 1845. It is part of the Grand Rapids metropolitan area and is located about 6.0 miles (9.7 km) northeast of the city of Grand Rapids.

== Communities ==
- Cannonsburg is an unincorporated community and census-designated place in the southeast part of the township.
- Chauncey (also known as Buena Vista and Imperial Mills) is an unincorporated, mostly historical settlement on the boundary between Cannon Township and Plainfield Township where Bear Creek enters the Grand River.

== History ==
The area that would become Cannon Township was originally attached to neighboring Plainfield Township. In 1837, Andrew Watson brought his family to Cannon and built the first farm in the township. Over the next decade, many other pioneers arrived and settled. In 1845, the township was split from Plainfield and took its present name. The state legislature organized Cannon Township as "Churchtown" in 1846. At the first town meeting, held in 1848, it was renamed "Cannon", after Cannonsburg, the largest village.

The earliest land claims date from 1835. Families began settling permanently in 1839. Zebulon Rood purchased 240 acres (97 ha) of land in 1840 and built Cannon's first house, a log structure. He also cut the first road, making it possible to transport goods across Bear Creek. During the nineteenth and early twentieth centuries, the production of wheat, wool, corn, apples and other fruits supported the economy. This building served as the township hall from 1890 until 1987, when it became the Cannon Historical Museum.

The township took its name from the small settlement of Cannonsburgh, which had been founded in 1842 at the direction of LeGrand Cannon, described as an eastern capitalist. The hamlet had two mills and a store by 1845, and the town was platted to encourage residential growth. LeGrand Cannon was proud of his little town, and provided a fitting gift in appreciation: a small cannon inscribed with his name and date. The cannon was used by the townspeople to commemorate holidays, such as the 4th of July, until someone was hurt firing the ordnance. The cannon was then buried to prevent further injuries, but was later discovered and refitted for firing. Unfortunately, another person was subsequently injured while firing the cannon, and again it was buried, and has not been found again to this day.

== Geography ==
According to the U.S. Census Bureau, Bowne Township has a total area of 36.97 square miles (95.75 km^{2}), of which 35.26 square miles (91.32 km^{2}) is land and 1.71 square miles (4.43 km^{2}) (4.63%) is water.

The water acreage comes from several small natural lakes in the township and an artificial one (Lake Bella Vista). The Grand River crosses the southwest corner of the township.

=== Major highways ===
- M-44 (NE Belding Road) runs west–east through the central portion of the township.

== Demographics ==
As of the census of 2000, there were 12,075 people, 3,913 households, and 3,341 families residing in the township. The population density was 336.5 per sq mi (872 per km^{2}). There were 4,174 housing units at an average density of 116.3 per sq mi (301 per km^{2}). The racial makeup of the township was 97.67% White, 0.47% African American, 0.12% Native American, 0.34% Asian, 0.08% Pacific Islander, 0.40% from other races, and 0.91% from two or more races. Hispanic or Latino of any race were 1.01% of the population.

There were 3,913 households, out of which 51.2% had children under the age of 18 living with them, 78.3% were married couples living together, 5.1% had a female householder with no husband present, and 14.6% were non-families. 11.4% of all households were made up of individuals, and 3.1% had someone living alone who was 65 years of age or older. The average household size was 3.09 and the average family size was 3.38.

In the township the population was spread out, with 34.2% under the age of 18, 5.4% from 18 to 24, 30.7% from 25 to 44, 23.6% from 45 to 64, and 6.1% who were 65 years of age or older. The median age was 35 years. For every 100 females, there were 102.7 males. For every 100 females age 18 and over, there were 100.6 males.

The median income for a household in the township was $70,925, and the median income for a family was $76,805. Males had a median income of $55,696 versus $31,310 for females. The per capita income for the township was $27,383. About 1.8% of families and 2.5% of the population were below the poverty line, including 2.2% of those under age 18 and 2.4% of those age 65 or over.

== Education ==
Cannon Township is served by three different public school districts. The majority of the township is served by Rockford Public Schools. The southeast corner of the township is served by Lowell Area Schools, and another smaller portion of the southern edge is served by Forest Hills Public Schools.
