= Pine Island Drive Bridge =

Historically significant bridge in Kent County, Michigan

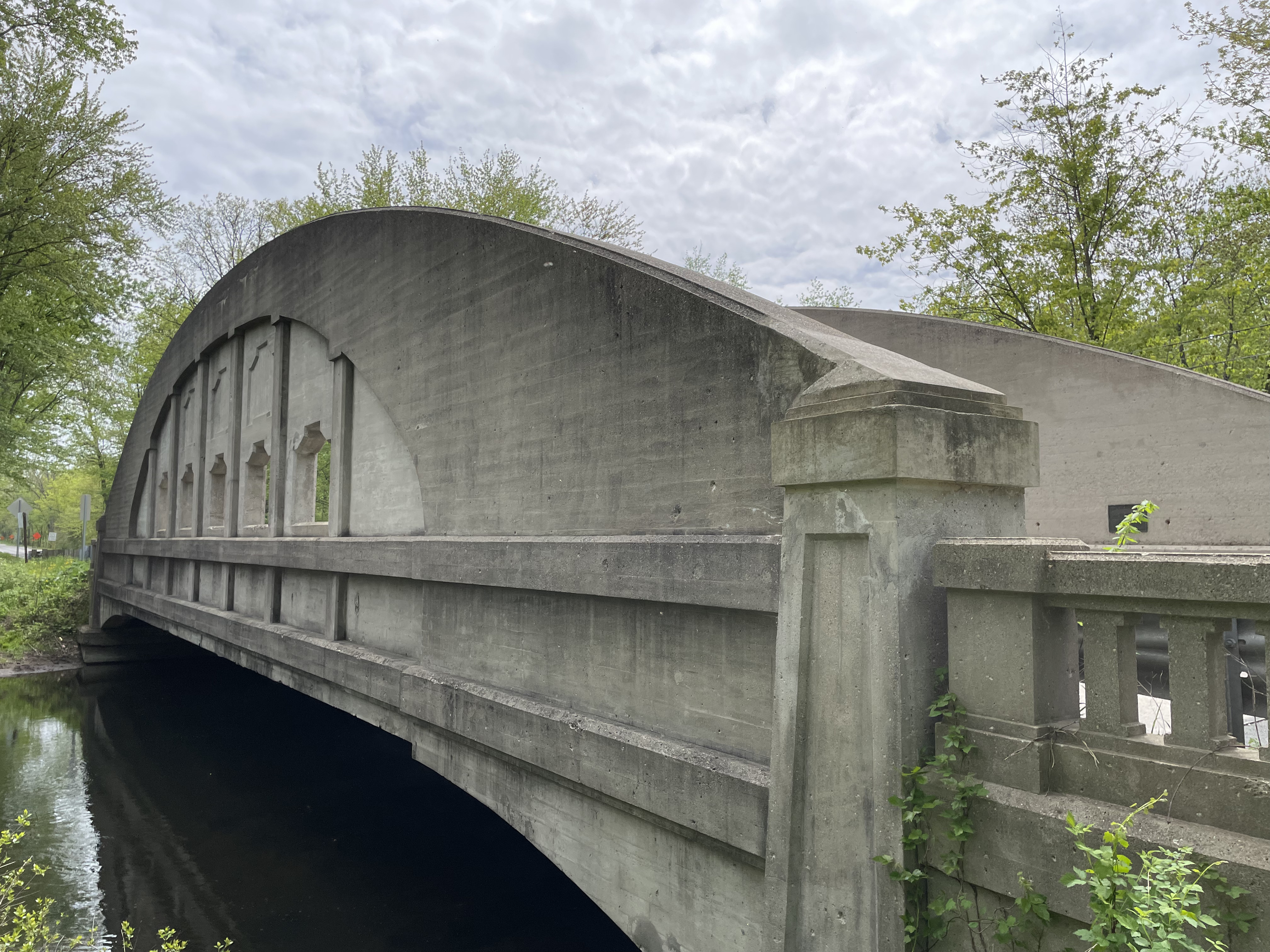
- North Approach
- Coordinates: 43°07′27″N 85°39′03″W
- Carries: Pine Island Drive
- Crosses: Rogue River
- Locale: Algoma Township, Michigan
- Maintained by: Kent County Road Commission

Characteristics
- Total length: 100 feet (30 m)
- Width: 20 feet (6.1 m)

History
- Opened: 1924
- Closed: in use

Location
- Interactive map of Pine Island Drive Bridge

Pine Island Drive Bridge
- Interactive map of Pine Island Drive Bridge
- 43.124052361815444°N 85.65078759324655°W

Michigan State Historic Site
- Designated: 2012; 14 years ago
- Reference no.: L2241

The Pine Island Drive Bridge is a historic Camelback-style bridge in Algoma Township, Michigan, carrying Pine Island Drive over the Rogue River It is believed to be the last remaining concrete rainbow arch bridge in the United States. The bridge, which is 100 feet long and 20 feet wide, was designed by Charles A. Melick and completed in 1924 under the direction of engineer Peter Brill. The bridge was designated a state historic landmark in 2012.
