= Porter Hollow Embankment and Culvert =

United States historic place

- U.S. National Register of Historic Places
- Michigan State Historic Site
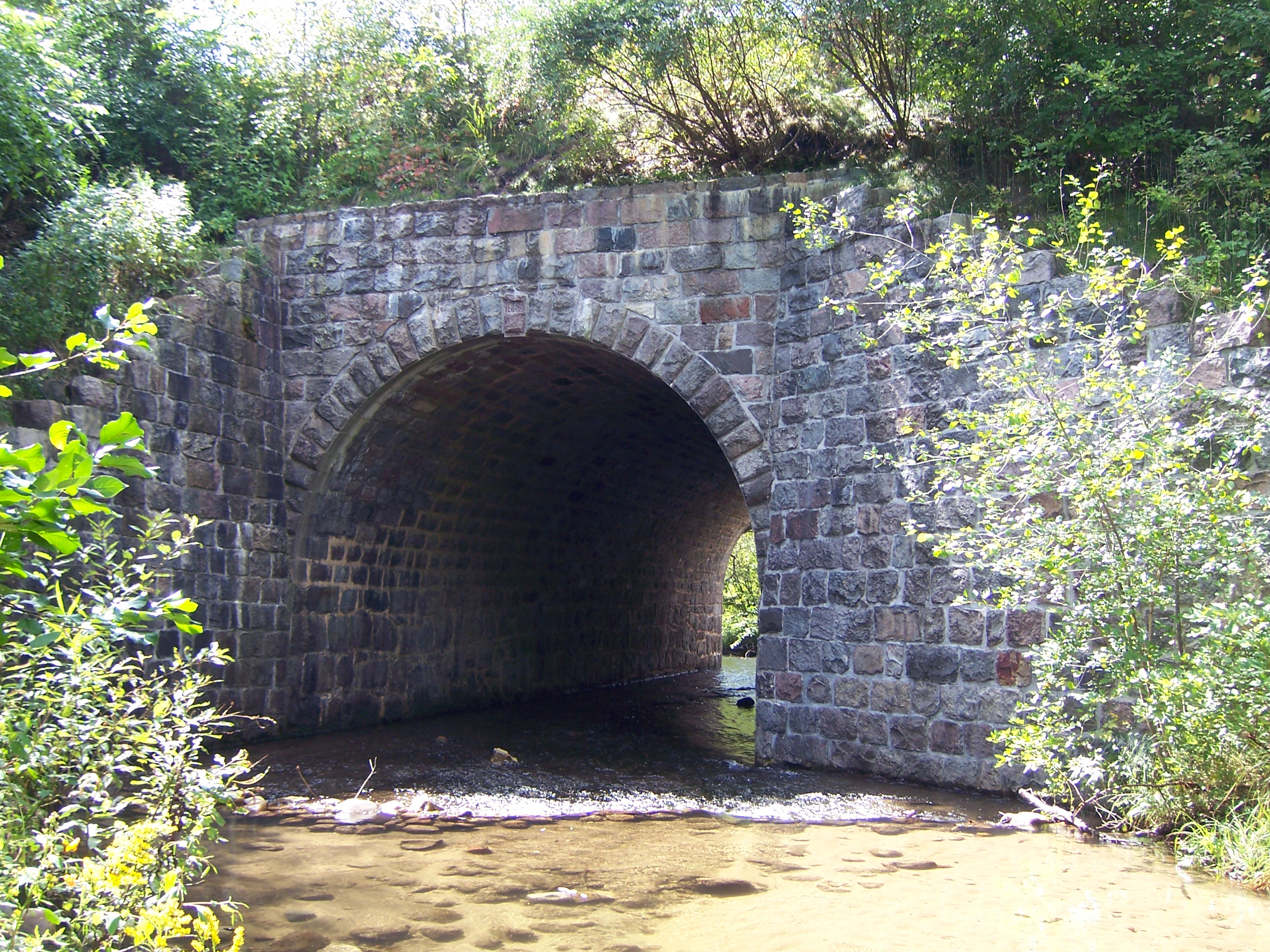

- Location within Michigan Location within the United States
- Interactive map
- Location: White Pine Trail at Stegman Creek, W of Summit Ave., Algoma Township, Michigan
- Coordinates: 43°9′57″N 85°34′1″W
- Built: 1885
- NRHP reference No.: 01001018
- Added to NRHP: September 24, 2001

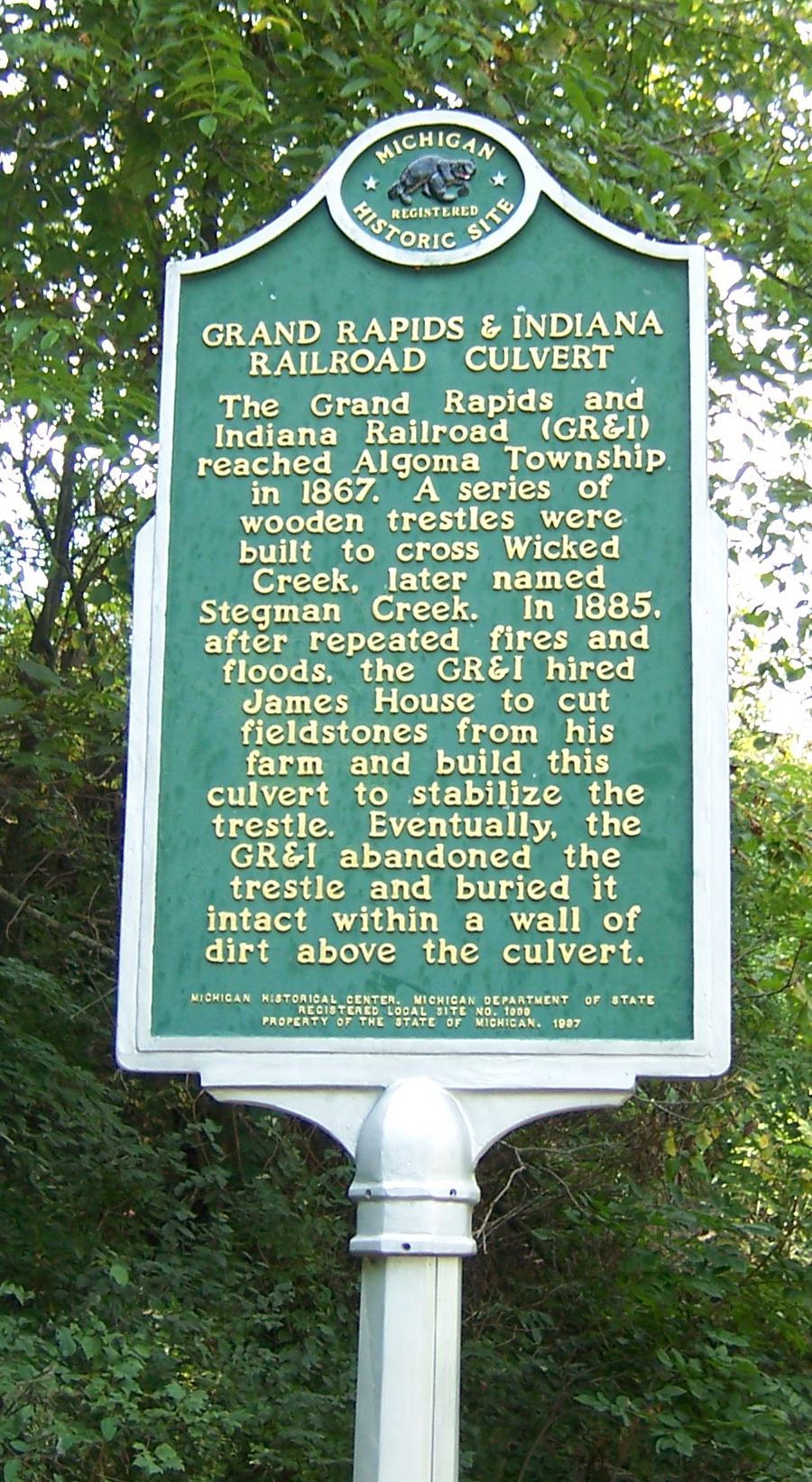
"The Grand Rapids and Indiana Railroad (GR&I) reached Algoma Township in 1867. A series of wooden trestles were built to cross Wicked Creek, later named Stegman Creek. In 1885, after repeated fires and floods, the GR&I hired James House to cut fieldstones from his farm and build this culvert to stabilize the trestle. Eventually, the GR&I abandoned the trestle and buried it intact within a wall of dirt above the culvert."

The Porter Hollow Embankment and Culvert, also known as the Grand Rapids and Indiana Railroad Culvert, is a stone bridge and trestle over the Stegman Creek along the White Pine Trail in Algoma Township, Michigan.

== History ==
The Grand Rapids and Indiana Railroad completed its railway through Algoma Township in 1867. Porter Hollow was an unincorporated community along this route, about 3 miles north of Rockford. At Porter Hollow the railroad built a large wooden trestle over Stegman Creek, then known as Wicked Creek. In 1883 a flood damaged the trestle, and a local farmer, James House, collected field stones to build the current trestle over the creek. The railroad ceased operations in 1985, and in the 1990s the Michigan Department of Natural Resources redeveloped the railroad right-of-way into a paved hiking and bicycling trail known as the White Pine Trail.

== Today ==
That stone bridge withstood the rigors of railroad use for nearly a century, and it is in good condition today. The trestle is listed on the National Register of Historic Places, and is a key bridge along the White Pine Trail. The Algoma Township Trestle Culvert was designated as a Michigan Historic Civil Engineering Landmark by the American Society of Civil Engineers in 2005.

== Description ==
The Porter Hollow embankment is a 1400-foot-long earth structure, which contains a stone arch culvert passing over Stegman Creek. The culvert is made of cut fieldstone, and measures nineteen feet in width, seventy-five feet in length, and passes about nineteen feet above the water level in the creek below. The stonework rises six feet above the top of the arch, and continues onto wingwalls at each end. The top of the culvert is blacktopped as part of the trail. An unusual feature of the culvert is that the bed of the creek below the culvert is lined with wooden planks.
