= Joe Staley =

American football player (born 1984)

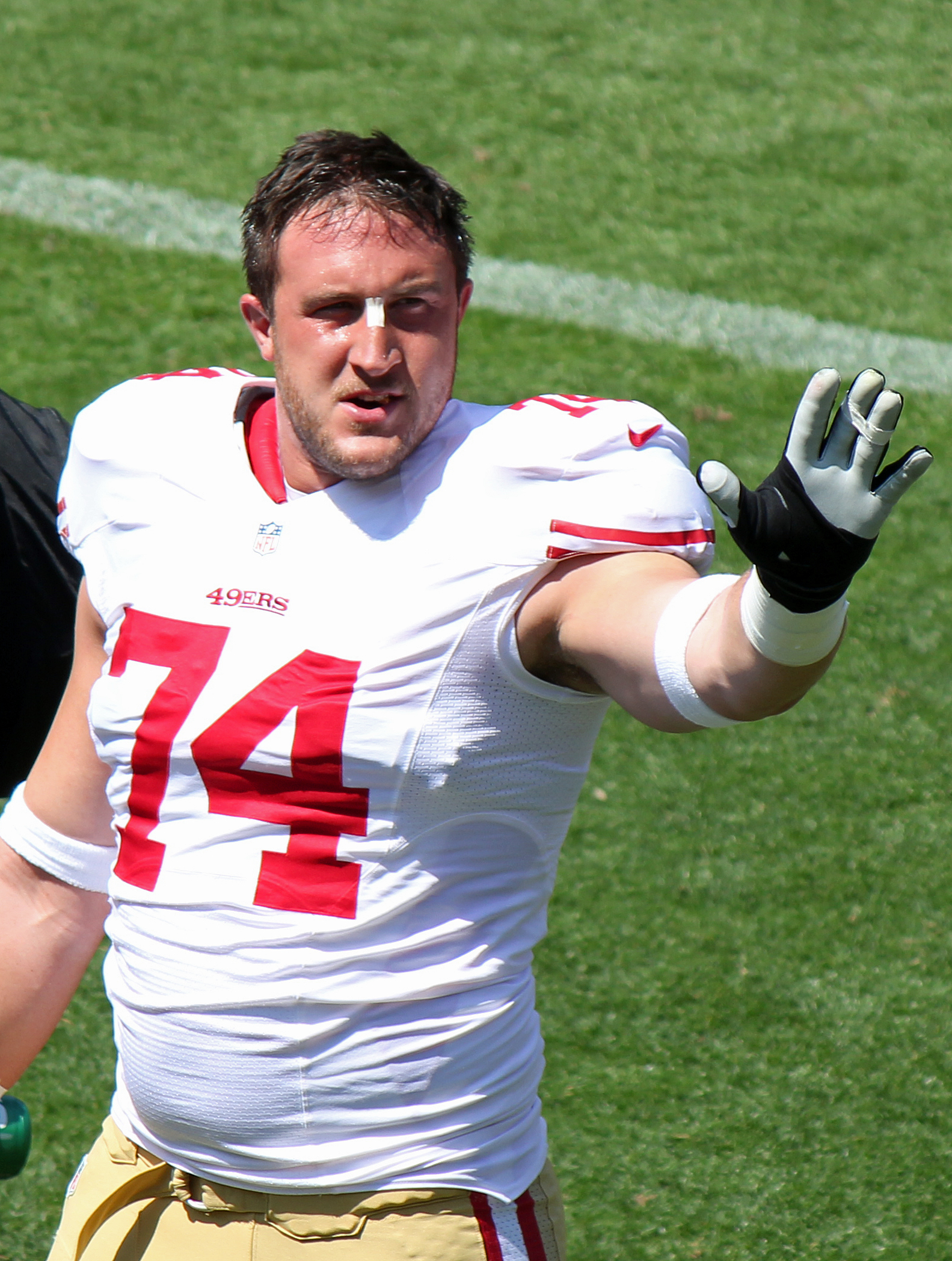
- Staley with the San Francisco 49ers in 2012

No. 74
- Position: Offensive tackle

Personal information
- Born: August 30, 1984 (age 42); Rockford, Michigan, U.S.
- Listed height: 6 ft 5 in (1.96 m)
- Listed weight: 295 lb (134 kg)

Career information
- High school: Rockford
- College: Central Michigan (2003–2006)
- NFL draft: 2007: 1st round, 28th overall pick

Career history
- San Francisco 49ers (2007–2019)

Awards and highlights
- 3× Second-team All-Pro (2011–2013); 6× Pro Bowl (2011–2015, 2017); NFL 2010s All-Decade Team; PFWA NFL All-Rookie Team (2007); Madden Most Valuable Protectors Award (2012)

Career NFL statistics
- Games played: 181
- Games started: 181
- Fumble recoveries: 7
- Stats at Pro Football Reference

Joseph Andrew Staley (born August 30, 1984) is an American former professional football player who spent his entire career as an offensive tackle for the San Francisco 49ers of the National Football League (NFL). He played college football for the Central Michigan Chippewas and was selected by the 49ers in the first round of the 2007 NFL draft.

== Early life ==
While attending Rockford High School in Rockford, Michigan, Staley earned two letters in football and two in track. He was named Grand Rapids Press Dream Team member. During his high school career, he caught 24 passes for 559 yards, and earned seven touchdowns as a prep senior. Staley was ranked No. 13 overall prospect by the Detroit Free Press and No. 49 by the Detroit News.

Staley was also a standout track and field athlete for the Rockford High School track team. During this time he set three school records. In the 200-meter dash, he set a record with a time of 21.9 seconds. In the 4 × 100 metres relay, he placed with a time of 42.56 seconds, and in the 4 × 200m relay, he finished with a time of 1:27.86 minutes. He also placed sixth in state in the 200 meters to earn all-state honors. The team was fourth in the 4 × 100m, fourth in 4 × 200m and sixth in 4 × 400m. His time of 21.9 seconds in the 200 meters ranks as the fastest among offensive linemen ever in the NFL.

== College career ==
Staley received an athletic scholarship to attend Central Michigan University, where he played for the Central Michigan Chippewas football team from 2003 to 2006. Staley began his career as a tight end. He added 80 pounds to his 6' 5" frame without sacrificing footspeed. He played in 11 games as a true freshman, catching 11 passes for 130 yards and one touchdown and posted a career-high two catches for 34 yards and a touchdown against Eastern Michigan University. Due to his size, Staley was moved to the offensive line during his sophomore season. He started all 11 games at right tackle.

He started all 11 games at left tackle and did not allow a single sack. He recorded 53 knockdown blocks and was part of an offensive line that helped CMU average 418.8 yards of offense per game. He also blocked for CMU's single-season total yardage record holder, Kent Smith. Staley helped pave the way for true freshman Ontario Sneed to run for 1,065 yards and earn Freshman All-America honors.

Staley was invited to play in the 2007 East–West Shrine Game and he was named a preseason All-MAC First-team selection by Athlon Sports and MAC Report Online. Staley was a dominant player at left tackle. Known for his size, Staley's speed was a rare exception. He ran a 4.70 seconds in the 40-yard dash at CMU's junior pro day. Staley was part of an offensive front that helped CMU boast a 1,000-yard rusher in three consecutive seasons. He was a key part of an offensive line that allowed Kent Smith to pass for at least 2,000 yards in 2004 and 2005. Staley played alongside former Cincinnati Bengals lineman Adam Kieft, who was also his high school teammate at Rockford High School.

== Professional career ==
Pre-draft measurables
Height	Weight	Arm length	Hand span	40-yard dash	10-yard split	20-yard split	20-yard shuttle	Three-cone drill	Vertical jump	Broad jump	Bench press
6 ft 5 7/8 in (1.98 m)	306 lb (139 kg)	33 1/2 in (0.85 m)	10 1/8 in (0.26 m)	4.79 s	1.64 s	2.73 s	4.40 s	7.09 s	32 in (0.81 m)	9 ft 4 in (2.84 m)	27 reps
Bench press from the 2007 NFL Scouting Combine; all other measurables from Pro Day at Central Michigan

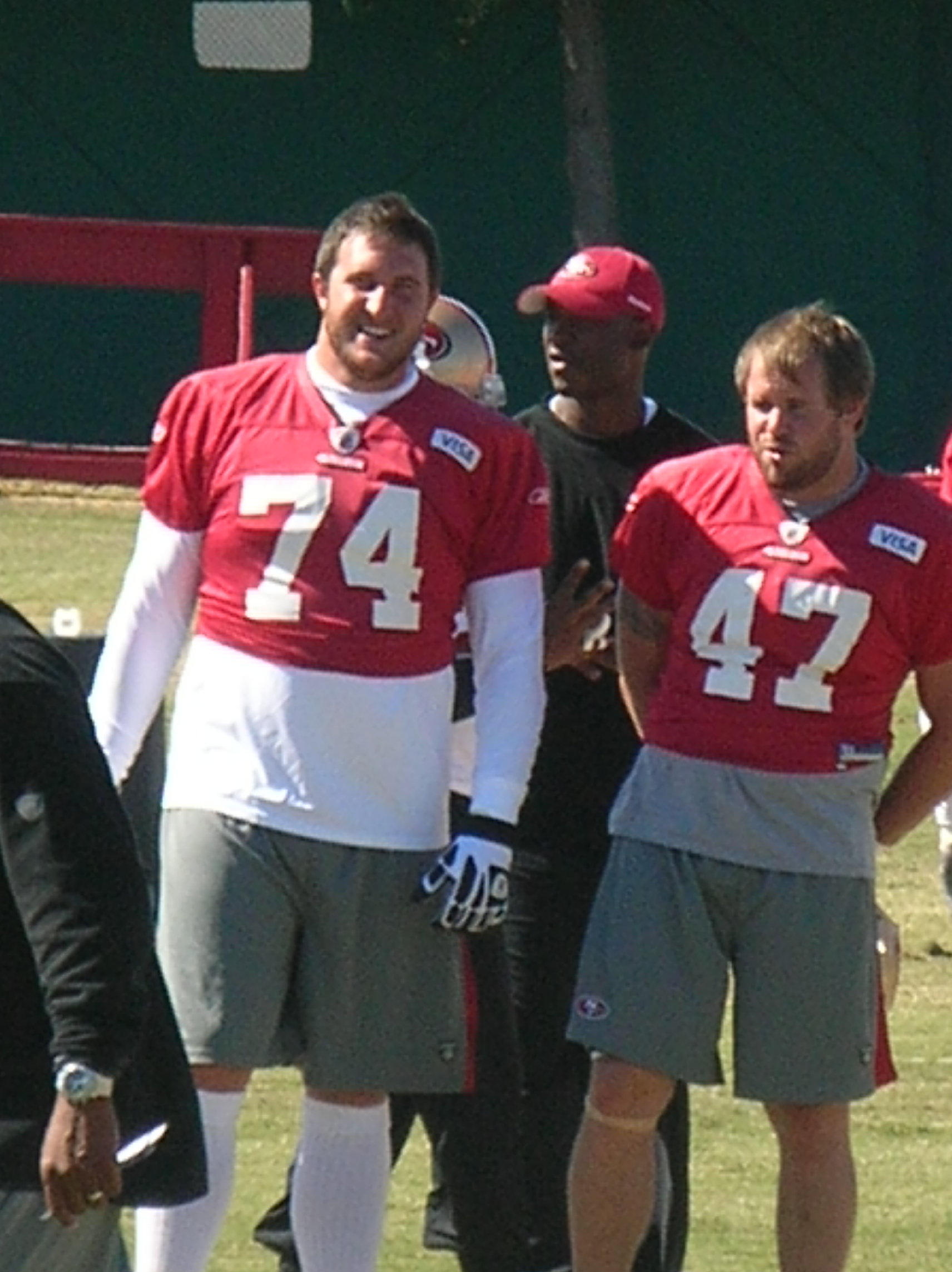
Staley with Brit Miller at 49ers training camp in 2010

Staley was selected by the San Francisco 49ers in the first round, 28th overall, in the 2007 NFL draft. The pick was acquired after the team traded into the first round with the New England Patriots giving up their 2008 first round pick (which became Jerod Mayo) and a 2007 fourth-round pick (which was subsequently traded to the Oakland Raiders for wide receiver Randy Moss).

He was named the starting right tackle over Kwame Harris on August 28, 2007. He finished the season with all 16 starts and allowed 8 sacks.

In the 2008 NFL season, Staley was moved to left tackle starting every game, allowing just 8.5 sacks.

Prior to the 2009 season, Staley signed a six-year contract extension with the 49ers through the 2017 season. He missed seven games of the season with a sprained knee, but managed to start all the other 9 games allowing just 3 sacks and having no penalties called against him.

On October 30, 2011, he caught a pass from a tackle eligible formation for a key first down in the 49ers' 20–10 victory over the Cleveland Browns.

On December 27, 2011, Staley was named to the 2012 Pro Bowl and started at left tackle for the NFC. He started every game for the 49ers during the 2011 season as they rushed for over 2,000 yards.

On December 26, 2012, Staley was named to the 2013 Pro Bowl. He started every game for the 49ers that season, despite a small scare involving a concussion. The 49ers finished 4th in the regular season, with 2,491 yards of rushing offense, 3rd in the league with 5.1 yards per carry, and tied for second in the league for the number of runs of at least 20 yards in length.

At the end of the 2012 season, Staley and the 49ers appeared in Super Bowl XLVII. He started in the game, but the 49ers fell to the Baltimore Ravens by a score of 34–31.

He signed a two-year extension in the 2014 offseason to extend his tenure through the 2019 season.

In 2017, Staley started 15 games at left tackle, missing one game with an eye injury, on his way to his sixth Pro Bowl.

On April 17, 2018, Staley signed a restructured contract with the 49ers which gave him a pay raise over the next two seasons.

On June 5, 2019, Staley signed a two-year contract extension with the 49ers through the 2021 season.

Staley reached another Super Bowl in the 2019 season, but the 49ers lost 31–20 in Super Bowl LIV to the Kansas City Chiefs. In his final act as a 49er, Staley called the ceremonial coin toss on behalf of the captains of the 49ers and Chiefs, which included fellow CMU alumnus Eric Fisher who went on to accept the Vince Lombardi Trophy on behalf of the Chiefs' players.

On April 25, 2020, Staley announced his retirement from the NFL after 13 seasons, following the 49ers' acquisition of Trent Williams. He was released with an injury settlement on May 1, 2020.

== Personal life ==
Staley is married to former professional soccer player Carrie Dew. They have two daughters, Grace and Audrey. He has hosted a video blog known as the "Joe Show" for the 49ers website.

Staley is a minority shareholder in the Premier League soccer club Leeds United.
