= Chauncey, Michigan =

Unincorporated settlement in Michigan, US

- Unincorporated community
- Location within the state of Michigan Location within the United States
- Coordinates: 43°03′01″N 85°33′01″W
- Country: United States
- State: Michigan
- County: Kent
- Townships: Cannon and Plainfield
- Elevation: 627 ft (191 m)
- Time zone: UTC-5 (Eastern (EST))
  - Summer (DST): UTC-4 (EDT)
- ZIP code(s): 49306 (Belmont)
- Area code: 616
- GNIS feature ID: 1617485

Chauncey, previously known as Buena Vista and Imperial Mills is an unincorporated, mostly historical settlement in Kent County in the U.S. state of Michigan. It is on the boundary between Cannon Township and Plainfield Township at 43°03′01″N 85°33′01″W, several miles northeast of Grand Rapids.

== Location and naming ==
It is situated near the south end of Chauncey Road where Bear Creek enters the Grand River. The community of Buena Vista was platted, but the plat was never recorded. The Buena Vista Mill was built in 1848 by Abner and John Brewer. The place, also known as Imperial Mills, was destroyed by fire in 1875 and rebuilt in September 1881 by Denis Porter.

The settlement presumably takes its name from the river bluff, Buena Vista Hill, rising just to its east, the summit of which affords extensive views of the westward bend of the Grand Valley, Kuttshill, and the many Plainfield Hills.

== Notes and references ==
- H. Belden & Co. (2005) [1876]. Illustrated historical atlas of the county of Kent, Michigan. Ann Arbor, Mich.: University of Michigan Library.
- Leeson, Michael A. (comp.) (2005) [1881]. History of Kent County, Michigan. Ann Arbor, Mich.: University of Michigan Library.
- Fisher, Ernest B., ed. (2005) [1918]. Grand Rapids and Kent County, Michigan : historical account of their progress from first settlement to the present time. Ann Arbor, Mich.: University of Michigan Library.
