= Cannonsburg, Michigan =

- Census-designated place (CDP) & unincorporated community
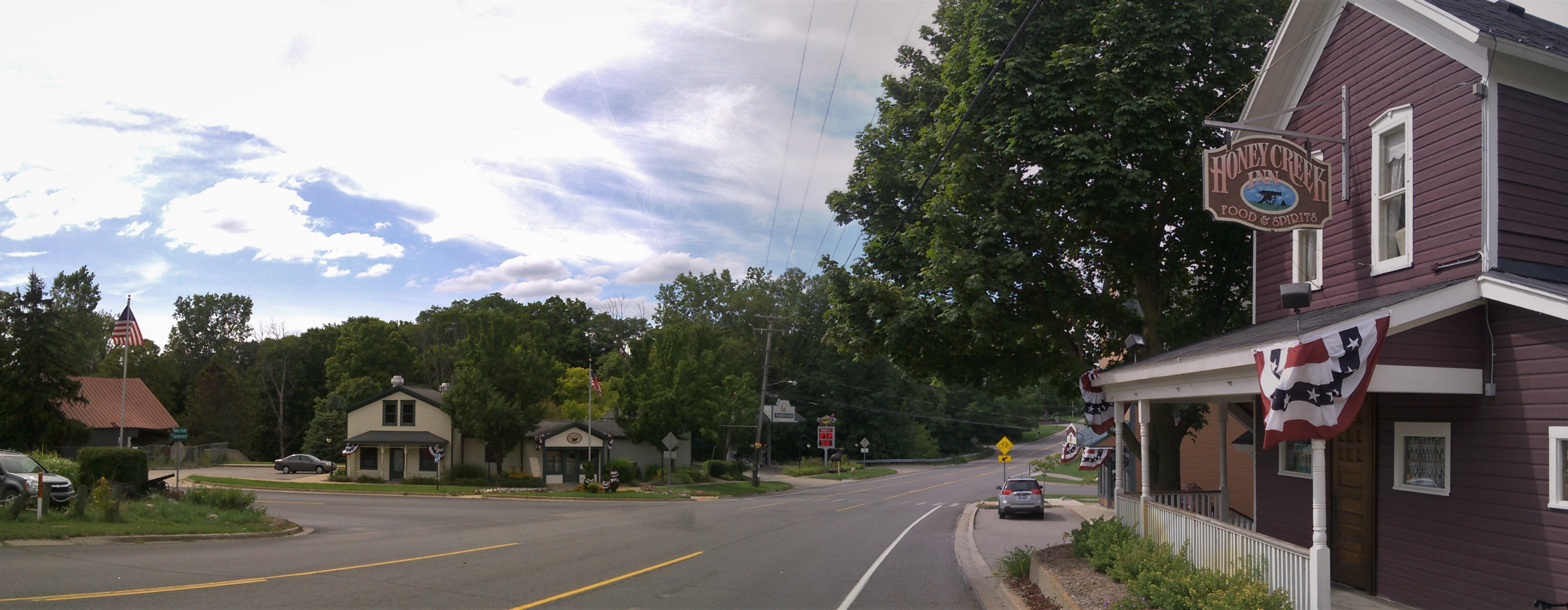
- Intersection of Cannonsburg and Honey Creek

- Location within the state of Michigan Location within the United States
- Coordinates: 43°03′14″N 85°28′11″W
- Country: United States
- State: Michigan
- County: Kent
- Township: Cannon
- Settled: 1842

Area
  - Total: 0.42 sq mi (1.10 km^{2})
  - Land: 0.42 sq mi (1.09 km^{2})
  - Water: 0.0039 sq mi (0.01 km^{2})
- Elevation: 781 ft (238 m)

Population (2020)
  - Total: 203
  - Density: 481.8/sq mi (186.02/km^{2})
- Time zone: UTC-5 (Eastern (EST))
  - Summer (DST): UTC-4 (EDT)
- ZIP code(s): 49301 (Ada); 49317; 49341 (Rockford)
- Area code: 616
- GNIS feature ID: 1617970

Cannonsburg is an unincorporated community and census-designated place (CDP) in Kent County in the U.S. state of Michigan. As of the 2020 census, Cannonsburg had a population of 203. The community is within Cannon Township about 10 miles (16.1 km) northeast of the city of Grand Rapids.

== History ==
While the area was still a part of Plainfield Township, the settlement at Cannonsburg was founded in 1842 on an old Native American trail (Chippewa and Ottawa populated the area prior to the region being opened for white settlers). In 1844 and 1845, mills were erected by Edwin B. Bostwick, with H.T. Judson as architect.

As an inducement to settlement, the community was platted in 1848 (or 1845 by some accounts). Bostwick, a business agent of railroad and steamboat financier LeGrand Cannon of Troy, New York, was instructed to give a lot to each resident who was not otherwise provided for. Twenty-five lots were given away and the town was named in honor of Cannon, who acknowledged the honor with the gift of a small cannon engraved with his name and the date.

The first record of the township separate from Plainfield is on April 6, 1846. Mention is made that the Michigan Legislature had organized the town under the name of "Churchtown" in the spring of 1846 (or 1845 in some sources). The name was soon after changed to Cannon, after the largest settlement.

A post office was established on May 7, 1844, with the spelling as "Cannonsburgh". The spelling was changed to Cannonsburg on February 5, 1894. The Cannonsburg ZIP code 49317 provides P.O. Box only service. Cannonsburg continued to be at the center of township business through the end of the 20th Century when the township offices were moved to a new location 2 miles to the north, along the M-44 corridor.

=== Recent history ===
For the 2020 census, Cannonsburg was included as a newly-listed census-designated place, which is included for statistical purposes only. Cannonsburg continues to remain an unincorporated community with no legal autonomy of its own.

== Demographics ==
Historical population
Census	Pop.	Note	%±
2020	203		—
U.S. Decennial Census

== Sources ==
- White, Arthur Scott; Fuller, George N. (2005) [1926]. History of Kent County. Ann Arbor, Mich.: University of Michigan Library.
- Fisher, Ernest B. (2005) [1918]. Grand Rapids and Kent County, Michigan : historical account of their progress from first settlement to the present time. Ann Arbor, Mich.: University of Michigan Library.
- Leeson, M. A. (2005) [1881]. History of Kent County, Michigan; together with sketches of its cities, villages and townships. Ann Arbor, Mich.: University of Michigan Library.
- Dillenback & Leavitt (2005) [1870]. History and directory of Kent County, Michigan. Ann Arbor, Mich.: University of Michigan Library.
- Cannon Township 1837–1983, Compiled by the Cannon Historical Society.
- The Rockford Register (now The Rockford Squire), Rockford, Michigan.
