= Parker Ehinger =

American football player (born 1992)

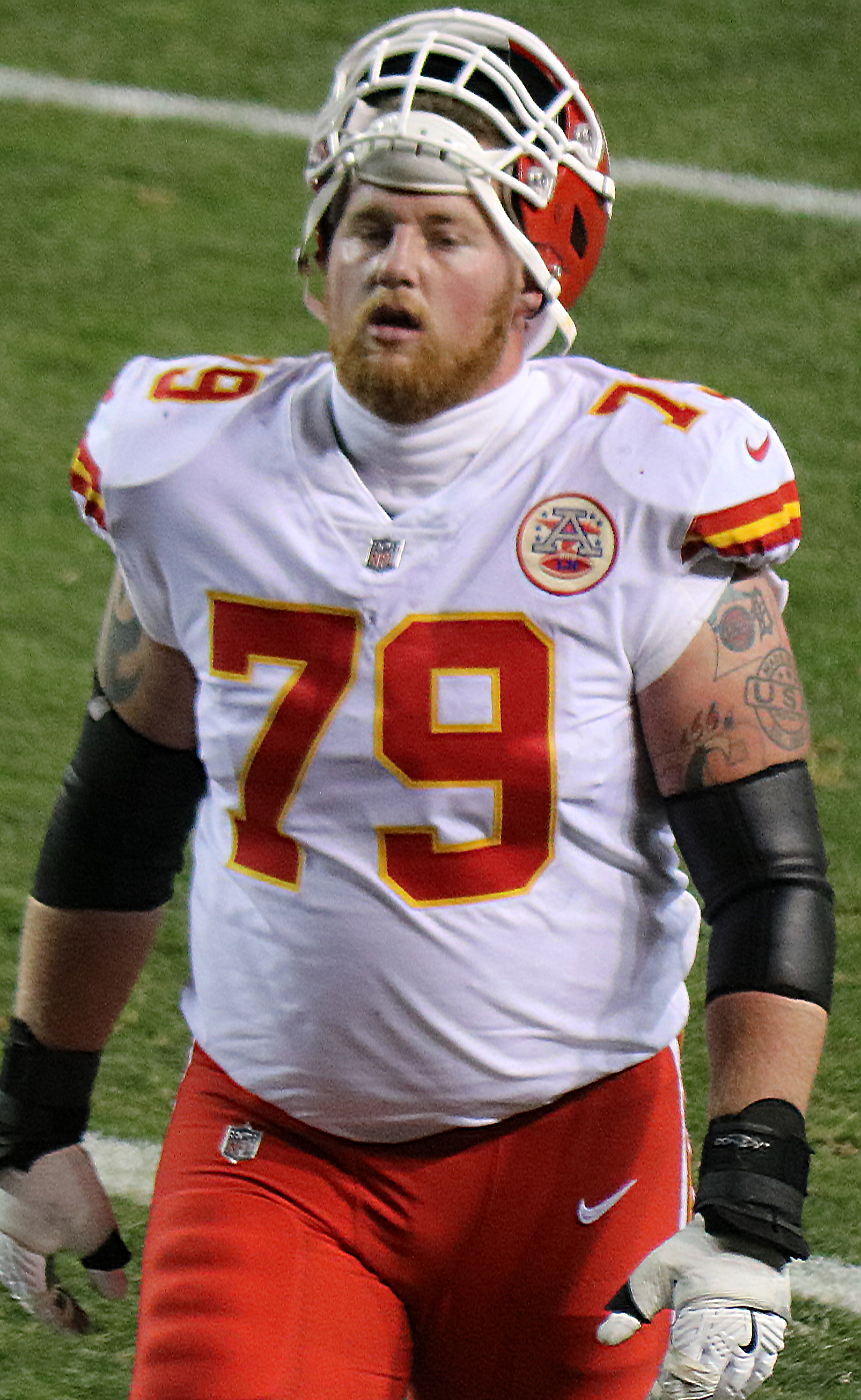
- Ehinger with the Kansas City Chiefs in 2017

No. 79, 70, 65
- Position: Guard

Personal information
- Born: December 30, 1992 (age 33); Rockford, Michigan, U.S.
- Listed height: 6 ft 6 in (1.98 m)
- Listed weight: 310 lb (141 kg)

Career information
- High school: Rockford
- College: Cincinnati
- NFL draft: 2016: 4th round, 105th overall pick

Career history
- Kansas City Chiefs (2016–2017); Dallas Cowboys (2018); Jacksonville Jaguars (2019)*; Arizona Cardinals (2019)*; Baltimore Ravens (2019–2020); Las Vegas Raiders (2021)*; Detroit Lions (2021)
- * Offseason or practice squad member only

Awards and highlights
- 2× First-team All-AAC (2014, 2015)

Career NFL statistics
- Games played: 10
- Games started: 6
- Stats at Pro Football Reference

Parker Ehinger (born December 30, 1992) is an American former professional football player who was a guard in the National Football League (NFL). He played college football for the Cincinnati Bearcats. He was selected by the Kansas City Chiefs in the fourth round of the 2016 NFL draft.

== Early life ==
Ehinger attended Rockford High School, where he was a two-year starter on the offensive line, while also seeing some action at tight end. As a senior, he helped the team achieve an 11–2 record, a district championship, and an appearance in the state semifinals. He received Division 1-2 All-State and Detroit Free Press Dream Team honors. He was named First-team All-OK-RED and All-Area in his last 2 seasons.

He also practiced the discus throw and shot put.

== College career ==
Ehinger accepted a football scholarship from the University of Cincinnati. He started 13 games at right tackle as a redshirt freshman. He started at right guard as a sophomore and junior.

He started at left tackle as a senior, helping the offense rank No. 6 nationally in total offense with a 537.8-yard average per game.

== Professional career ==
Pre-draft measurables
Height	Weight	Arm length	Hand span	40-yard dash	10-yard split	20-yard split	Vertical jump	Broad jump
6 ft 6 1/4 in (1.99 m)	310 lb (141 kg)	33 in (0.84 m)	9 7/8 in (0.25 m)	5.26 s	1.75 s	3.01 s	27.5 in (0.70 m)	8 ft 1 in (2.46 m)
All values from NFL Combine

=== Kansas City Chiefs ===
Ehinger was selected by the Kansas City Chiefs in the fourth round (105th overall) of the 2016 NFL draft. As a rookie, he started 4 games at left guard. On November 5, He was placed on the injured reserve list, after tearing the ACL, MCL and meniscus in his right knee during the week 8 game against the Indianapolis Colts.

On August 21, 2017, he was activated from the Physical Unable to Perform list. He started in the season opener at right guard, but was declared inactive the rest of the season.

=== Dallas Cowboys ===
On August 30, 2018, Ehinger was traded to the Dallas Cowboys in exchange for cornerback Charvarius Ward. He suffered a knee injury in practice and was placed on the injured reserve list on September 7, 2018.

On April 10, 2019, the Cowboys waived Ehinger.

=== Jacksonville Jaguars ===
On April 11, 2019, Ehinger was claimed off waivers by the Jacksonville Jaguars. He was waived on May 9, 2019.

=== Arizona Cardinals ===
On August 2, 2019, Ehinger was signed by the Arizona Cardinals. He was released on August 31, 2019.

=== Baltimore Ravens ===
On September 16, 2019, Ehinger was signed to the practice squad of the Baltimore Ravens. He was promoted to the active roster on November 30, 2019. He was placed on injured reserve on January 8, 2020.

Ehinger re-signed with the Ravens on July 29, 2020. He was released on September 5, 2020. He was re-signed to their practice squad on December 4, 2020. He was placed on the practice squad/injured list on January 12, 2021. His practice squad contract with the team expired after the season on January 25, 2021.

=== Las Vegas Raiders ===
On June 4, 2021, Ehinger signed with the Las Vegas Raiders. He was released on August 23, 2021.

=== Detroit Lions ===
On October 6, 2021, Ehinger was signed to the Detroit Lions practice squad.
