= Rockford Public Schools (Michigan) =

School district in Michigan

Address
- 350 N. Main St. Rockford, Kent, Michigan, 49341; United States

District information
- Type: Public
- Grades: Pre-kindergarten through 12
- Superintendent: Dr. Steve Matthews
- Schools: 14
- Budget: $153,077,000 (2022-2023 expenditures)
- NCES District ID: 2630030

Students and staff
- Students: 7,509 (2024-25)
- Teachers: 441.75 FTE (2024-2025)
- Staff: 1,258.89 FTE (2024-2025)
- Student–teacher ratio: 17.0 (2024-2025)
- District mascot: Rams

Other information
- Website: www.rockfordschools.org

Rockford Public Schools is a school district in the US state of Michigan. It serves the town of Rockford and parts of the townships of Algoma, Cannon, Courtland and Plainfield in Kent County.

== History ==
The modern school system was formed in the late 1950s by combining various neighborhood school systems.

Erwin J. Kleinert became superintendent in 1940 and was instrumental in consolidating many of the one-room school districts into Rockford Public Schools. He remained as superintendent until 1962, when he then became superintendent of Kent County Intermediate School District.

North Rockford Middle School was built as Rockford High School. The school was funded by a 1958 bond issue, and H.E. Beyster was the architect. Prior to that, the high school had been located at 350 N. Main Street, in the building presently used for district administration. It was built around 1923.

The present Rockford High School opened in December 1992. The middle school was moved to the former high school in fall 1993, and sixth graders were moved to the former middle school in November 1992. That building, Sheridan Trails Middle School, became the Freshman Center in fall 2000.

== Schools ==
Schools in Rockford
Schools	Address	Notes
Parkside Early Childhood Center	156 Lewis Street	Pre-K. It used to be Parkside Elementary School.
Belmont Elementary	6097 Belmont Ave.	Grades K-5
Cannonsburg Elementary	4894 Sturgis Ave.	Grades K-5
Crestwood Elementary	6350 Courtland Dr, NE	Grades K-5
Edgerton Trails Elementary	9605 Edgerton Avenue NE	Grades K-5. Opened 2024
Lakes Elementary	6849 Young Avenue	Grades K-5
Meadow Ridge Elementary	8100 Courtland Drive	Grades K-5
Roguewood Elementary	3900 Kroes Street	Grades K-5
Valley View Elementary	405 Summit Avenue	Grades K-5
East Rockford Middle School	8615 Nine Mile Road	Grades 6-8
North Rockford Middle School	397 E. Division	Grades 6-8
Rockford Freshman Center	4500 Kroes St NE	Grade 9
Rockford High School	4100 Kroes St NE	Grades 10-12. Built 1992.
River Valley Academy	350 North Main Street	Alternative high school. Grades 9-12
