= Eliphalet H. Turner House =

- Turner House
- U.S. National Register of Historic Places
- Michigan State Historic Site
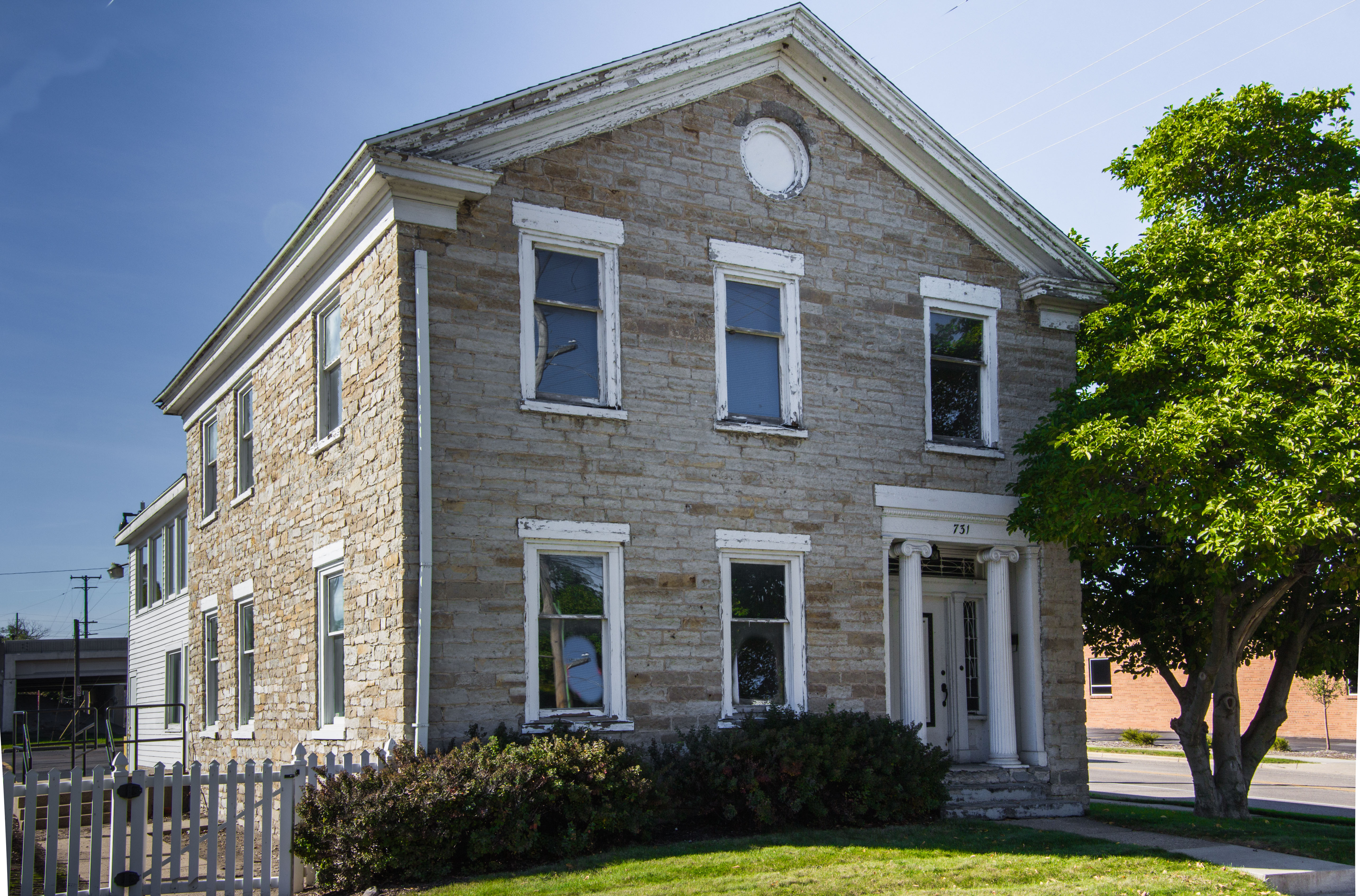

- Location within Michigan Location within the United States
- Interactive map
- Location: 731 Front St., NW, Grand Rapids, Michigan
- Coordinates: 42°58′35″N 85°40′35″W
- Area: 0.6 acres (0.24 ha)
- Built: 1845; 181 years ago
- Built by: G. Colton, Eliphalet H. Turner
- Architectural style: Greek Revival
- NRHP reference No.: 70000277
- Added to NRHP: July 8, 1970

The Eliphalet H. Turner House was built as a single-family home located at 731 Front Street NW in Grand Rapids, Michigan, United States. It was listed on the National Register of Historic Places in 1970. The house has been renovated to house a recording studio.

== History ==
Eliphalet Turner arrived in Grand Rapids in 1833. He served as the first city clerk the next year. Turner was a contractor, and constructed the first bridge across the Grand River and the first Kent County jail. Some time later, he purchased land on the west side of the Grand River, and in about 1845 contracted with Gideon Colton to build a house. It is likely that Turner himself also contributed to the house's construction. Turner continued to be active in real estate and Grand Rapids city affairs until he died in 1870. Even while Turner was alive, the house was recognized as one of the finest in Grand Rapids. Although this area of Front Street once was home to a string of fine houses constructed in the mid-1800s, the Turner House is the only one remaining. In 1895, the house was sold to William Patton, a glass cutter. A frame addition was later made to the rear of the house. By the 1930s, the house was owned by Mrs. Phoebe Patton.

The house was renovated in 2017.

== Description ==
The Turner House is a two-story Greek Revival building constructed of native gray and buff limestone quarried from the bottom of the rapids. The house measures 28 feet by 60 feet. The entryway is framed with Ionic columns and side lights. On the interior, the main stairway is made of red cherry, and incorporates a handrail ending in the carved form of a man's hand as well as a newel post containing a sterling silver inscribed, "G. Colton, Builder."
