= Villa Maria (Grand Rapids, Michigan) =

- U.S. National Register of Historic Places
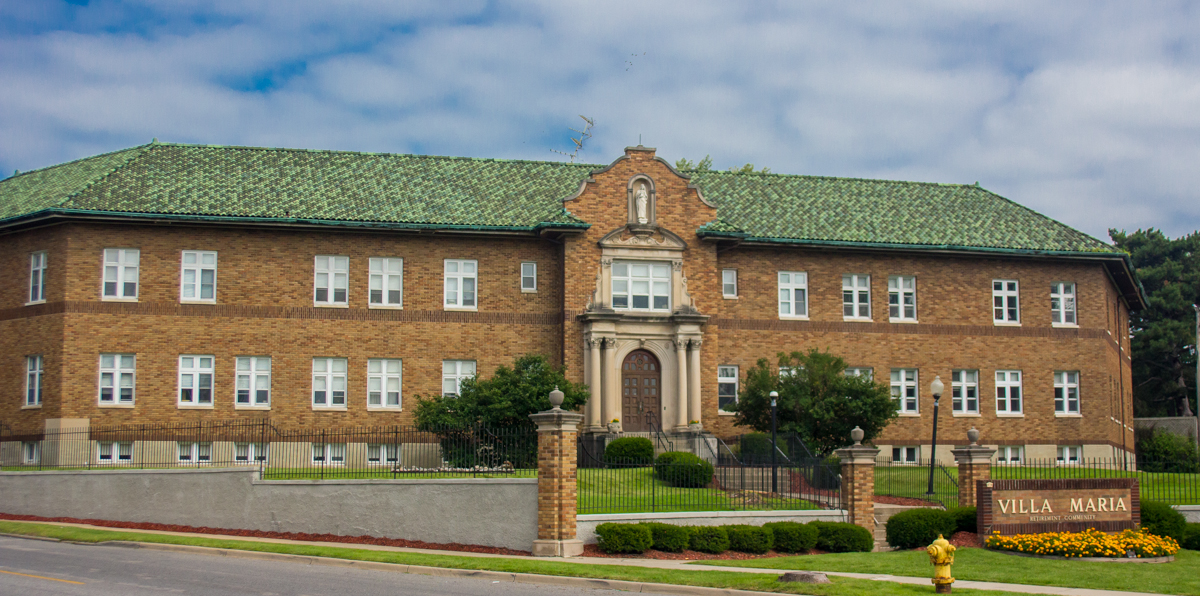

- Location within Michigan Location within the United States
- Interactive map
- Location: 1315 Walker NW, Grand Rapids, Michigan
- Coordinates: 42°59′01″N 85°42′02″W
- Area: 6 acres (2.4 ha)
- Built: 1904
- Built by: B. J. Hogan & Sons
- Architect: Wernette & McCarthy
- NRHP reference No.: 86003373
- Added to NRHP: March 27, 1987

Villa Maria is a retirement community located at 1315 Walker NW in Grand Rapids, Michigan. The campus was originally operated for the purpose of ministering to troubled young women. It was listed on the National Register of Historic Places in 1987.

== History ==
In 1904, a convent of the Sisters of Good Shepherd was founded in Grand Rapids for the purpose of ministering to troubled young women, providing them with a home and skills to help them to a new start. A farmstead property where Villa Maria now stands was purchased later that year; the farmhouse on the property was used as convent. The first new structure, the Industrial Building, was constructed the following year. It was used both as a dormitory and work space for the women living there, known as penitents. By 1910, Villa Maria housed eight sisters and 71 women needing assistance. The campus was expanded in the 1920s, with the 1922 construction of the Penitent Building and Chapel (designed by architects Wernette & McCarthy). The Monastery Building was added in 1926-27, after which the original farmhouse was sold off.

In 1938, the Sisters of the Cross, an affiliated convent, took up residence in the Industrial Building. They remained there until 1951, when a new building was constructed for them. In 1974 the original Industrial Building was remodeled. However, through the 1970s the number of penitents in the program declined, and in 1985 the program was ended. The Sisters of the Good Shepherd decided to sell the facility, specifically to a developer who would adapt the buildings for senior citizen housing. In 1987, the Villa Maria Retirement Community opened.

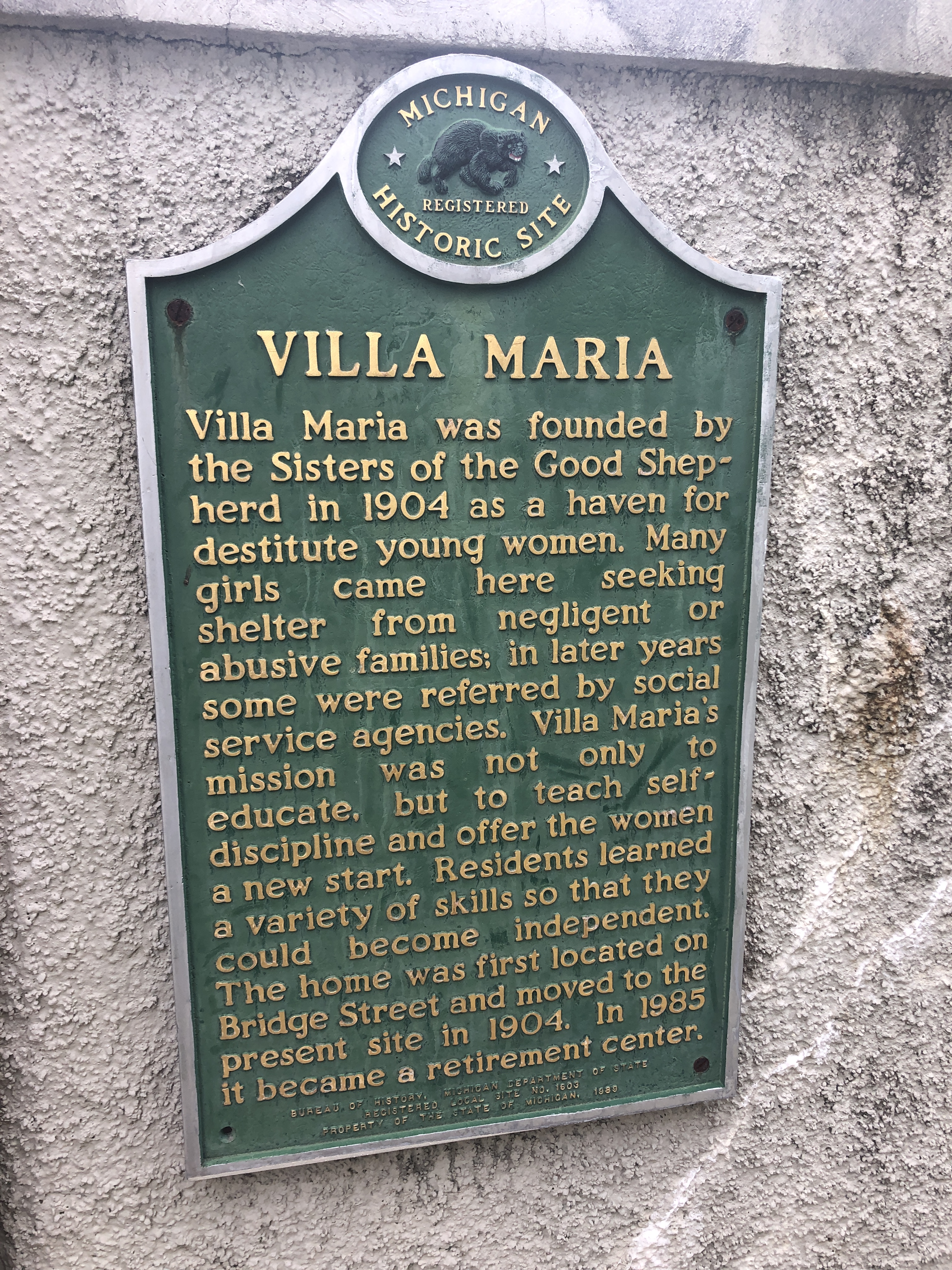
Villa Maria Historic Marker

== Description ==
Villa Maria consists of nine buildings, six of which contribute to the historic character of the complex. These include:

- Industrial building (built in 1905): a three-story steel structure with brick exterior walls, originally with a hipped roof covered with clay tile. A flat roof was installed during the 1974 renovation.
- Penitent building (built in 1921): a three-story masonry wall building with a hipped roof covered with green clay tile. The building has distinctive arched window walkways and porches.
- Chapel building (built in 1921): a two-story masonry wall building with a gable roof covered with a green clay tile. The windows are stained glass. Two small wings were added in 1959.
- Monastery Building (built in 1926): a two-story masonry wall building with a hipped roof covered with green clay tile. The main entrance has decorative stone columns, and an arched doorway with a statue of the Good Shepherd.
- Boiler room (likely early 1920s): a one-story masonry building with a steel-framed flat roof.
- Enclosed walkway (built in 1959): a flat-roofed concrete and brick structure connecting the chapel and monastery buildings.
