= Park Church (Grand Rapids, Michigan) =

Historic church in Michigan, United States

- First (Park) Congregational Church
- U.S. National Register of Historic Places
- Michigan State Historic Site
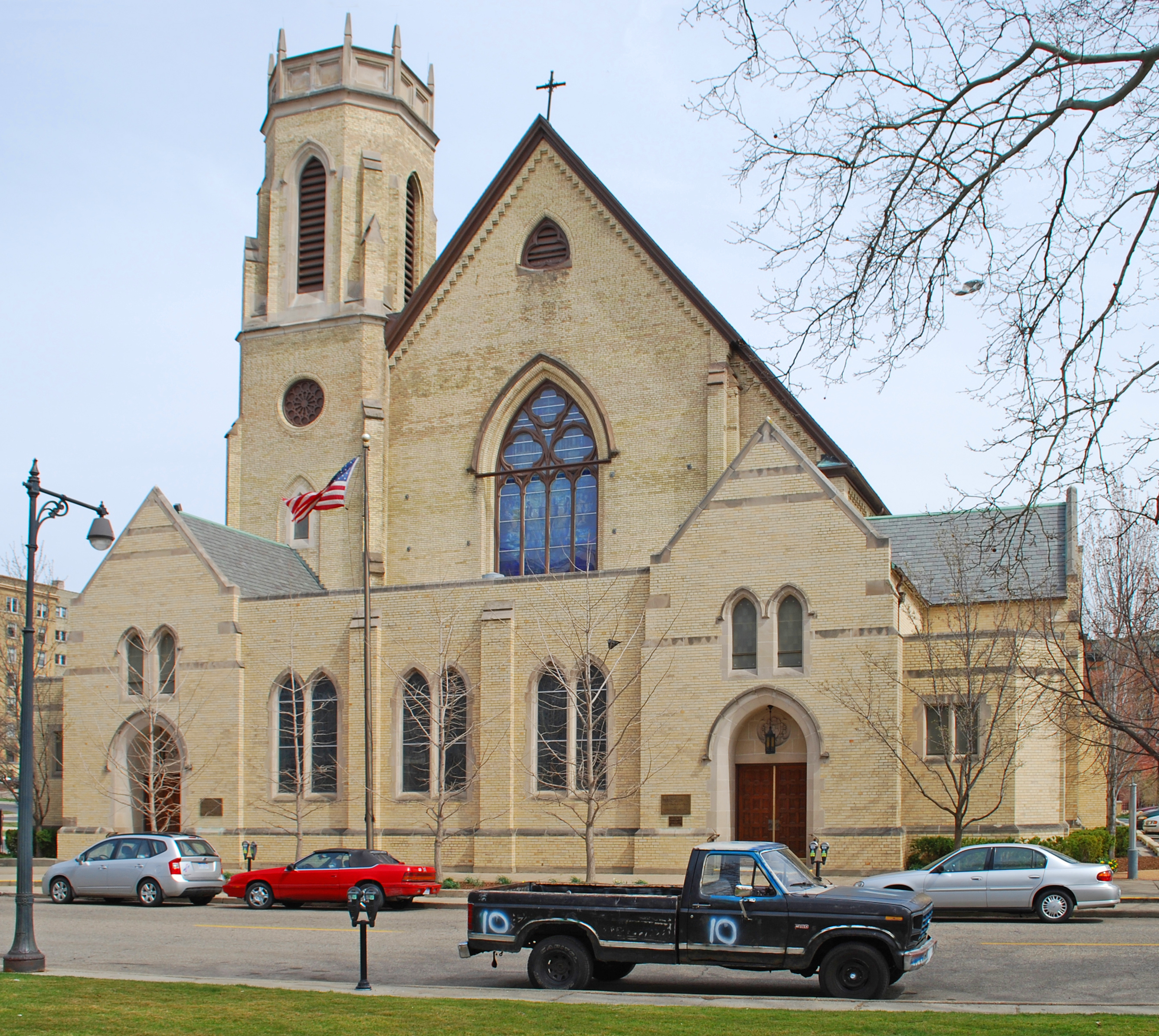

- Location within Michigan Location within the United States
- Interactive map
- Location: 10 E. Park Pl., NE, Grand Rapids, Michigan
- Coordinates: 42°57′51″N 85°39′56″W
- Area: 1.4 acres (0.57 ha)
- Built: 1868
- Architect: A. Barrows
- Architectural style: Gothic Revival, High Victorian
- NRHP reference No.: 82000538
- Added to NRHP: November 12, 1982

Park Church is a historic church at 10 E. Park Place, NE in Grand Rapids, Michigan. It was added to the National Register of Historic Places in 1982.

== History ==
The congregation that eventually became the Park Church was organized in 1836 as a Presbyterian congregation with twenty-two members. In 1839, the church reorganized as the First Congregational Church of Grand Rapids. In 1840, the congregation purchased a church building originally constructed in 1837 for the local Catholic parish, but which the parish had not been able to afford. By 1867, the congregation had outgrown this building, and they sold it in preparation for constructing a new church. They selected A. Barrows of Adrian, Michigan, about whom almost nothing is known, as the architect. Ground was broken in 1868, and the church was completed in 1869 at a cost of $75,000.

A fellowship hall was added to the church in 1915, and the sanctuary was refinished in 1930 by Ralph Adams Cram.

== Description ==
The Park Church is a white-yellow brick Gothic structure consisting of three sections: the original 1868-69 church, the 1915 Fellowship Hall, and a 1950 addition which wraps around the sanctuary's front and sides. The 1868-69 church is a stone-trimmed, brick structure measuring 132 by 70 feet. It has an asphalt roof, replacing the original slate one. A buttressed tower topped by an octagonal belfry is located at one corner. The belfry has louvered, pointed openings, and is topped by paneled parapets, replacing the original spire and pinnacles. The original church facade contained a Gothic portal flanked by secondary entrances, but these have been covered by the addition. The 1915 fellowship hall is a two-and-one-half-story, rectangular structure with a hip roof and a small corner tower. The 1950 narthex addition was designed to harmonize as much as possible with the historic structure. It is a single-story wraparound structure surrounding the front and sides of the 1868-69 church.

The sanctuary also contains fourteen stained glass windows from the Tiffany Studios, which were installed between 1904 and 1938.
