= Loraine Building =

- U.S. National Register of Historic Places
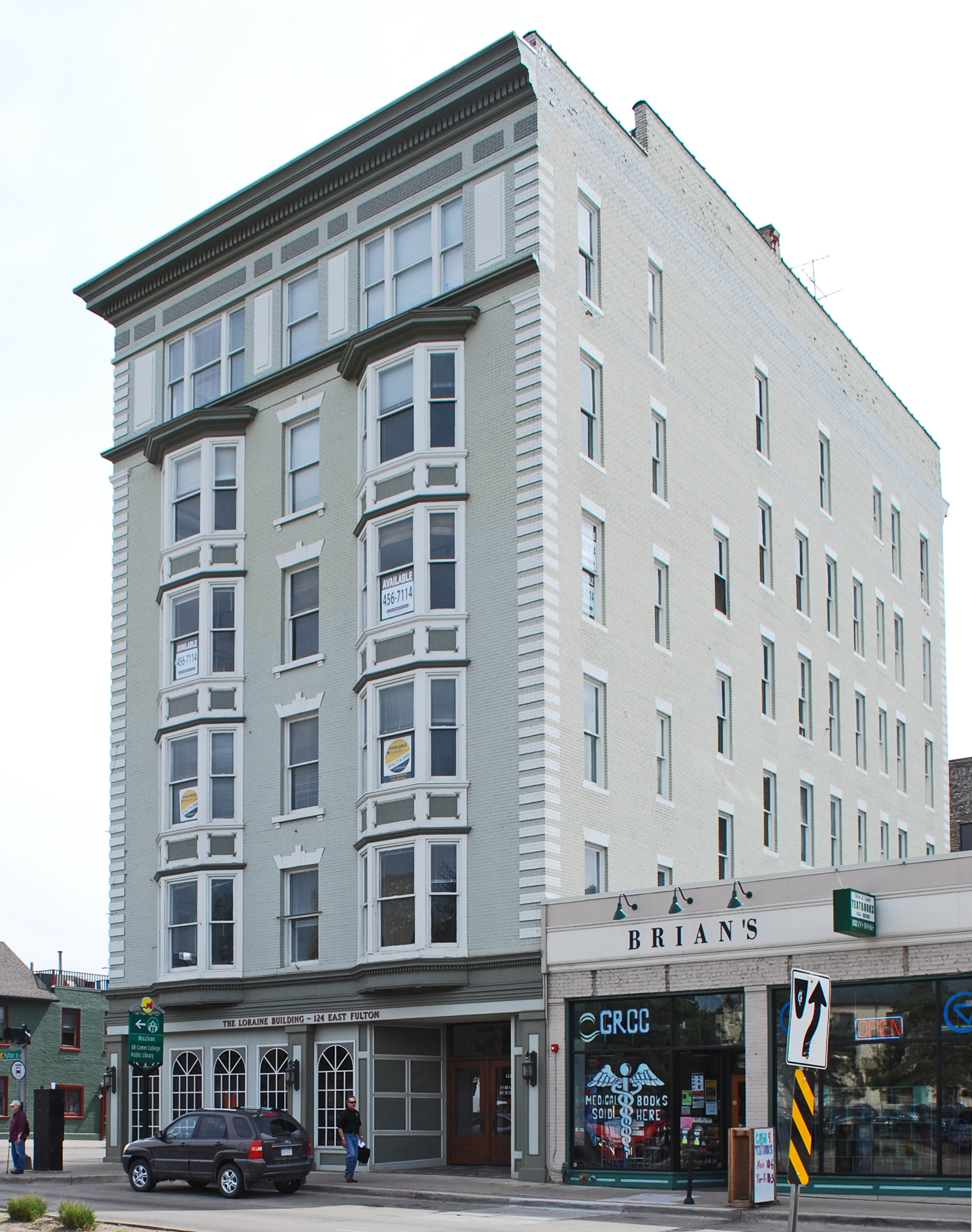

- Location within Michigan Location within the United States
- Interactive map
- Location: 124 E. Fulton St., Grand Rapids, Michigan
- Coordinates: 42°57′47″N 85°39′56″W
- Area: less than one acre
- Built: 1902
- Architectural style: Georgian Revival
- NRHP reference No.: 82000539
- Added to NRHP: November 24, 1982

The Loraine Building, located at 124 East Fulton Street in Grand Rapids, Michigan, was constructed as an apartment building, and was later converted into office space. It was listed on the National Register of Historic Places in 1982.

== History ==
In 1901, Frank Immen constructed this building, the first apartment building in Grand Rapids catering to upper-middle-income tenants. The original structure was five floors tall, housing commercial space on the first floor and apartments above. The building was known as the "Immen Building" for a short time, but Immen soon changed the name to the "Loraine Building" in honor of his wife. In 1910 Immen sold the building to retired Tennessee lumberman Alston Willey. Willey added a sixth floor atop the building. Over the years, the apartments were gradually converted into office space, with the building being completely converted by 1950.

== Description ==
The Loraine Building is a rectangular, six-story brick Georgian Revival structure, measuring 92 feet by 45 feet, with a flat roof. The front and side facades contain prominent wooden bay windows projecting from the second to the fifth floors. There are two projecting bay units on the front facade, separated by a set of one-over-one windows, and three projecting bay units on the side facade, separated by three sets of one-over-one windows. A metal, dentiled cornice runs across the top of the building. A smaller matching dentiled belt course runs above the first floor. The facades have brick decorative elements, including angle quoins and rusticated keystones over windows. The first floor contains entrances into the commercial space. Two metal fire escapes run up the sides.
