= Bailey House (Kentwood, Michigan) =

Historic octagonal home in Michigan

Coordinates: 42°54′20″N 85°34′04″W

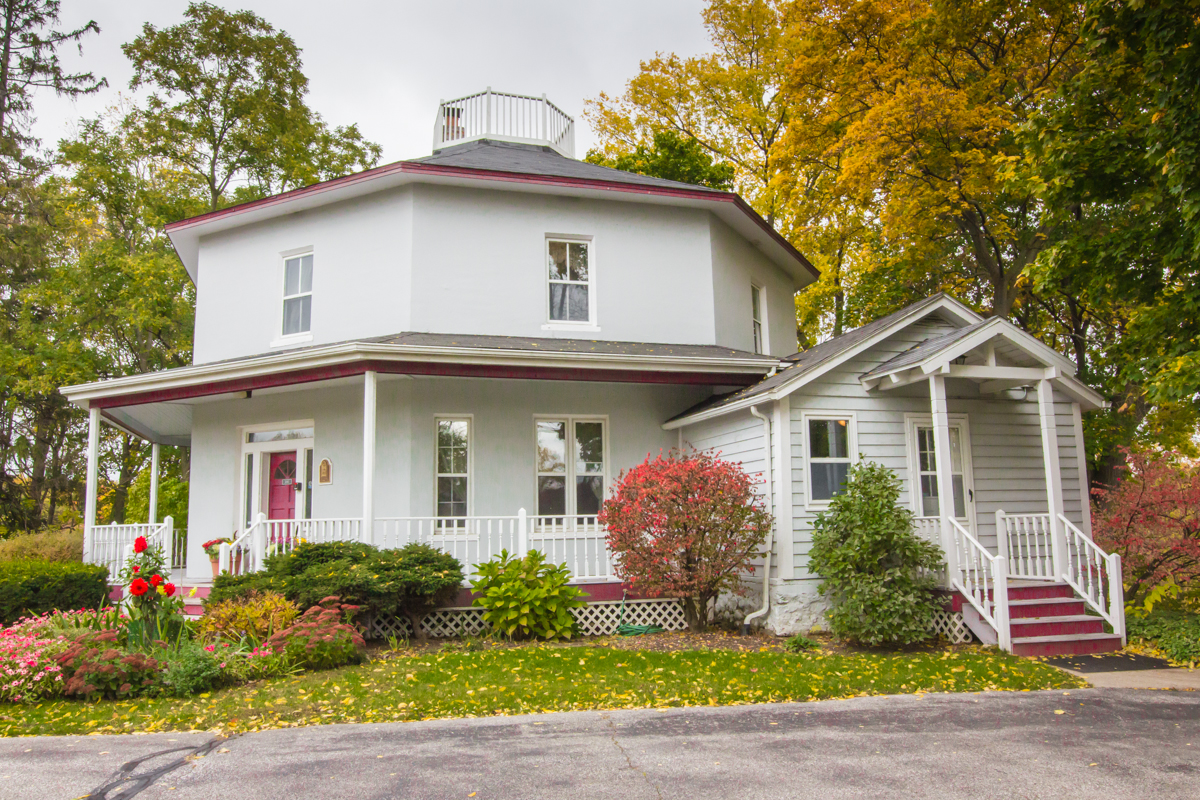

The Bailey Octagon House is a historic octagonal home located at 3180 East Paris Ave. SE in Kentwood, Michigan.

== History ==
The Bailey Octagon House was built in 1855 by Sluman and Delia Bailey, who were farmers and horticulturalists in Paris Township. Sluman Bailey served as township supervisor, collector for the U.S. Internal Revenue Service, justice of the peace, sheriff of Kent County, clerk of the board of elections, and school inspector. Their home was a hub of social and political activity in the township.

The home was placed on the Michigan Registry of Historic Homes in 1975. The house was declared a Kentwood Historic Site by the Kentwood Historical Preservation Commission in 1991. A historic plaque commemorating its status was dedicated in 2001, making it the city's first site to receive such a marker. At the time of the plaque's dedication, the home was owned by Lynn Mack, a psychologist who operated a counseling practice in the building. The house is currently used as an office building for a financial services firm.

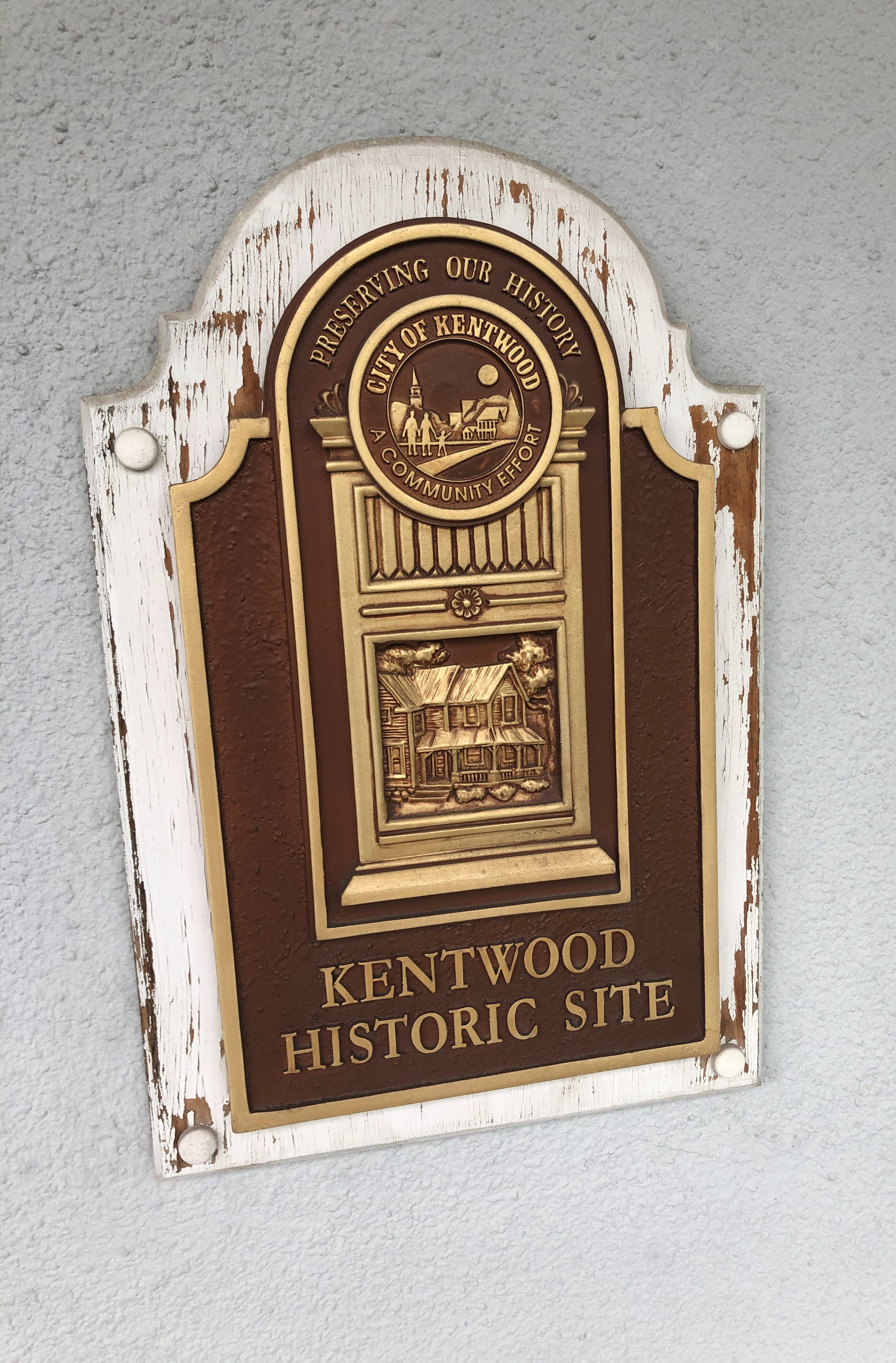

== Description ==
The design of the house was based on the work of builder Orson Fowler, who believed that octagonal structures allowed for more sunlight and provided a healthy spiritual, physical, and psychological environment. The house has exterior walls made of a limestone/sand mixture known as "gravel wall" construction (an old form of concrete) and is supported by huge log timbers common to that era.
