= Adam Kieft =

American football player (born 1982)

No. 70
- Position: Offensive tackle

Personal information
- Born: August 21, 1982 (age 44)
- Listed height: 6 ft 7 in (2.01 m)
- Listed weight: 337 lb (153 kg)

Career information
- High school: Rockford (Rockford, Michigan)
- College: Central Michigan University
- NFL draft: 2005: 5/ Pick 153rd round

Career history
- 2005–2007: Cincinnati Bengals

Adam Kieft (born August 21, 1982) is an American former professional football offensive tackle for the Cincinnati Bengals of the National Football League (NFL). Kieft attended Rockford High School in Rockford, Michigan. He was selected with the 17th pick of the fifth round of the 2005 NFL draft out of Central Michigan University. He was redshirted his freshman year of college due to a broken foot and started the following four years as an offensive tackle for the Chippewas. He stands 6'7" tall and weighs 337 lbs.

Kieft sat out his first two seasons in Cincinnati due to a knee injury (torn ACL/MCL in rookie mock game). He signed a 3-year contract with the Bengals after being drafted in the fifth round with the 153rd overall pick in the 2005 NFL draft. On August 28, 2007, Kieft was placed on the reserve/injured list. On February 28, 2008, the Bengals did not tender an offer to Kieft, making him a free agent.
