= Algoma Township, Michigan =

Township in Michigan, United States

- Civil township
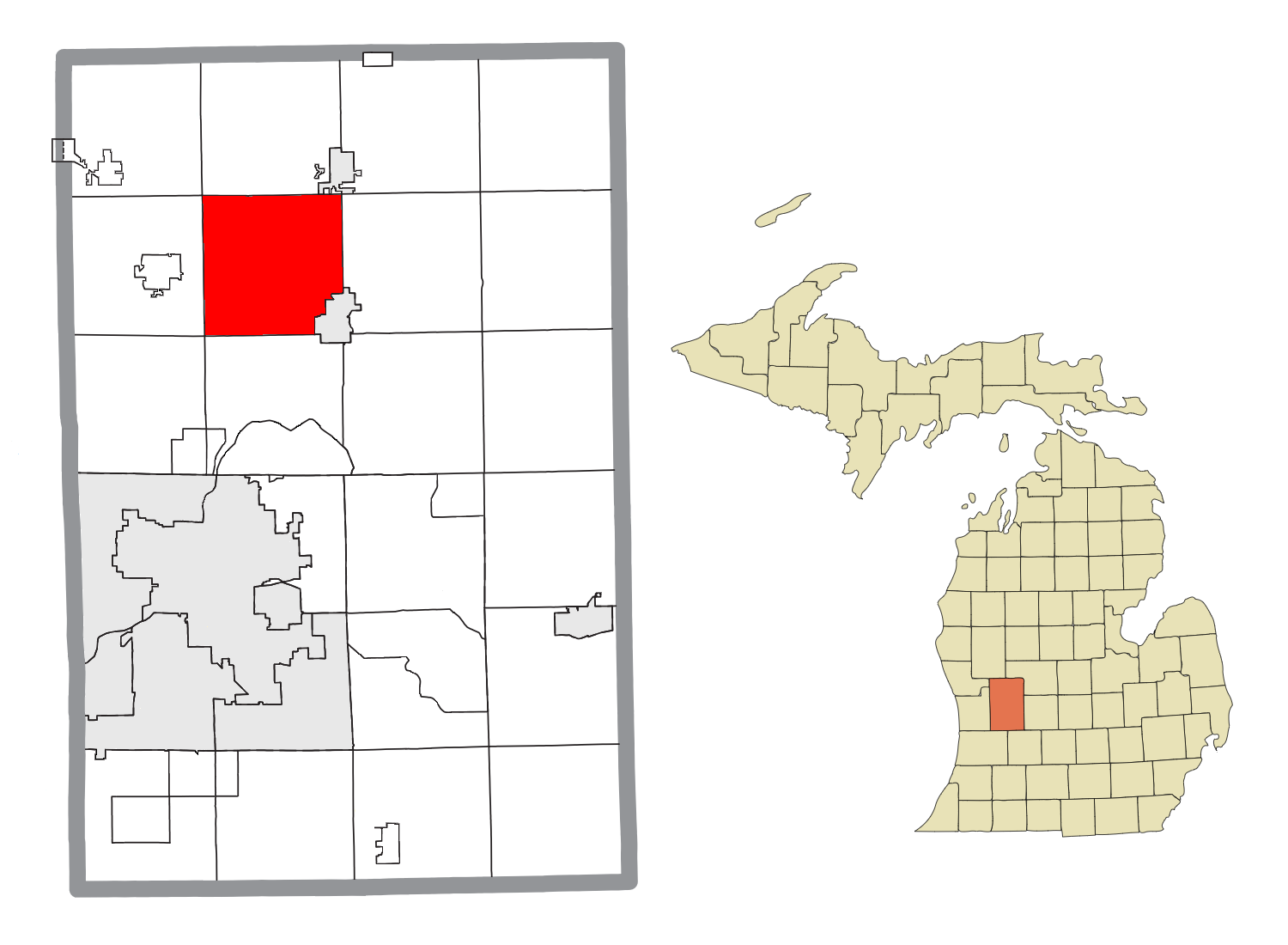
- Location within Kent County

- Location within the state of Michigan Location within the United States
- Coordinates: 43°10′00″N 85°36′30″W
- Country: United States
- State: Michigan
- County: Kent
- Established: 1849

Government
  - Supervisor: Kevin Green
  - Clerk: Judy Bigney

Area
  - Total: 34.93 sq mi (90.47 km^{2})
  - Land: 34.13 sq mi (88.40 km^{2})
  - Water: 0.80 sq mi (2.07 km^{2})
- Elevation: 764 ft (233 m)

Population (2020)
  - Total: 12,055
  - Density: 353.2/sq mi (136.4/km^{2})
- Time zone: UTC-5 (Eastern (EST))
  - Summer (DST): UTC-4 (EDT)
- ZIP code(s): 49319 (Cedar Springs); 49321 (Comstock); 49341 (Rockford); 49345 (Sparta)
- Area code: 616
- FIPS code: 26-081-01160
- GNIS feature ID: 1625817
- Website: Official website

Algoma Township is a civil township of Kent County in the U.S. state of Michigan. The population was 12,055 at the 2020 census, which is a large increase from 9,932 at the 2010 census.

The township is part of the Grand Rapids metropolitan area and is located about 10 miles (16 km) north of the city of Grand Rapids.

== History ==
Algoma was originally settled in 1843. The township was established in 1849.

In 1856, C. C. Comstock of Grand Rapids founded a mill in the township around which developed the community of Gougeburg.

A village by the name of Burchville was established in 1868. It had a post office until 1879. In 1869, the village of Edgerton was established. It had its own post office until 1937.

== Geography ==
According to the U.S. Census Bureau, the township has a total area of 34.93 square miles (90.47 km^{2}), of which 34.13 square miles (88.40 km^{2}) is land and 0.80 square miles (2.07 km^{2}) (2.29%) is water.

White Pine Trail State Park passes through the eastern portion of the township. The Rogue River runs through the southern portion of the township.

=== Major highways ===
- US 131 runs south–north through the eastern portion of the township.
- M-57 (NE 14 Mile Road) enters briefly at the eastern edge of the township and has its western terminus at U.S. Route 131.

== Education ==
Algoma Township is served by three public school districts. The northwestern portion of the township is served by Sparta Area Schools. The southeastern portion of the township is served by Rockford Public Schools, while a smaller northeastern portion is served by Cedar Springs Public Schools.

== Demographics ==
As of the census of 2000, there were 7,596 people, 2,588 households, and 2,158 families residing in the township. The population density was 217.9 inhabitants per square mile (84.1/km^{2}). There were 2,692 housing units at an average density of 77.2 per square mile (29.8/km^{2}). The racial makeup of the township was 97.54% White, 0.22% African American, 0.29% Native American, 0.45% Asian, 0.01% Pacific Islander, 0.72% from other races, and 0.76% from two or more races. Hispanic or Latino of any race were 1.67% of the population.

There were 2,588 households, out of which 42.3% had children under the age of 18 living with them, 72.3% were married couples living together, 7.8% had a female householder with no husband present, and 16.6% were non-families. 12.8% of all households were made up of individuals, and 4.0% had someone living alone who was 65 years of age or older. The average household size was 2.94 and the average family size was 3.20.

In the township the population was spread out, with 30.2% under the age of 18, 6.8% from 18 to 24, 31.8% from 25 to 44, 23.9% from 45 to 64, and 7.4% who were 65 years of age or older. The median age was 35 years. For every 100 females, there were 98.1 males. For every 100 females age 18 and over, there were 97.3 males.

The median income for a household in the township was $58,285, and the median income for a family was $62,863. Males had a median income of $45,281 versus $28,870 for females. The per capita income for the township was $23,150. About 2.6% of families and 3.7% of the population were below the poverty line, including 4.5% of those under age 18 and 2.1% of those age 65 or over.
