= Sixth Street Bridge (Grand Rapids, Michigan) =

Truss bridge in Grand Rapids, Michigan

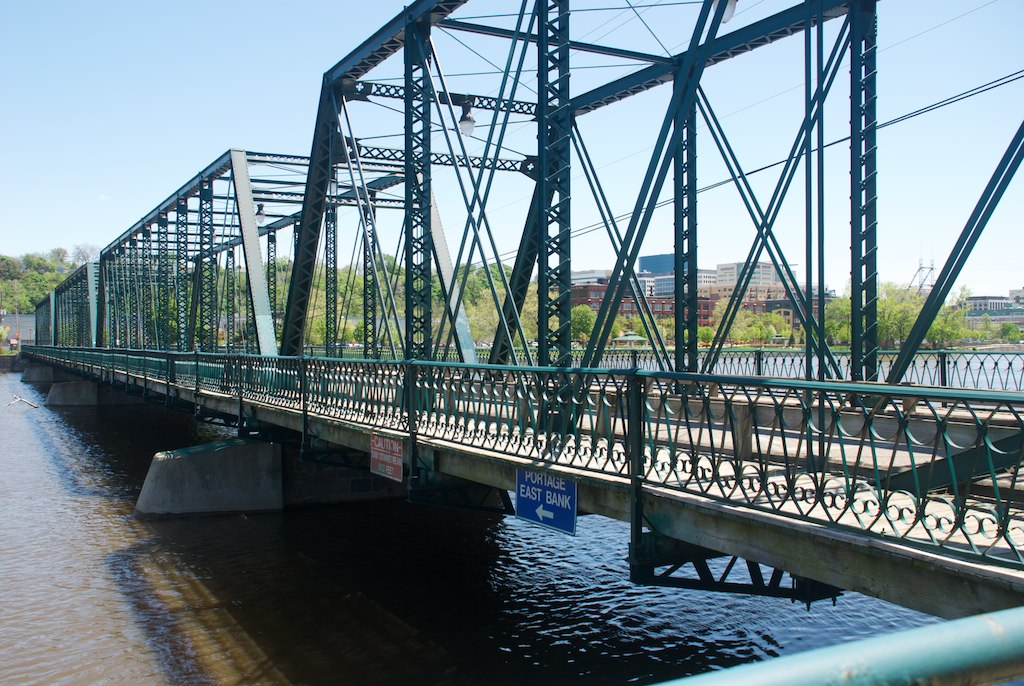
- Sixth Street Bridge in 2011
- Coordinates: 42.9767°N 85.674°W
- Carries: Automobiles
- Crosses: Grand River

Characteristics
- Total length: 536 feet (163 m)
- No. of spans: 4

History
- Designer: Massillon Bridge Company
- Constructed by: Massillon Bridge Company
- Construction cost: $31,000
- Sixth Street Bridge
- U.S. National Register of Historic Places
- Michigan State Historic Site
- Location within Michigan Location within the United States
- Coordinates: 42.9767°N 85.674°W
- Built: 1886
- NRHP reference No.: 76001030

Significant dates
- Added to NRHP: August 13, 1976
- Designated MSHS: June 18, 1976

Location
- Interactive map of Sixth Street Bridge

The Sixth Street Bridge is a four-span, wrought iron bridge that crosses the Grand River in Grand Rapids, Michigan. It is a Michigan State Historic Site and is listed on the National Register of Historic Places. Built in 1886, it is the longest and oldest metal truss bridge in Michigan.

== History ==
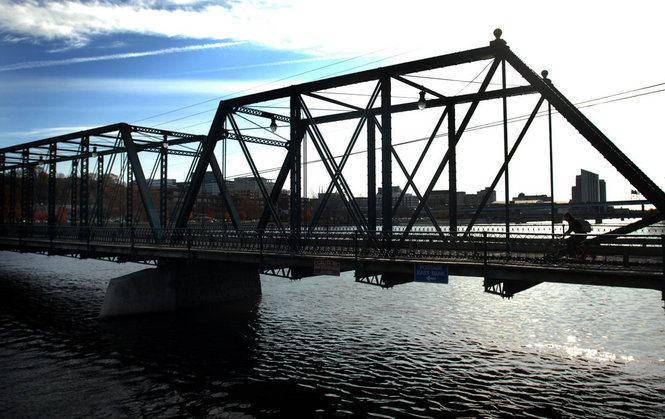
West end of bridge, seen in 2012, that was shortened

The Sixth Street Bridge was designed and built in 1886 by the Ohio-based Massillon Bridge Company for $31,000. The westernmost truss was shortened in 1921 when a canal along the river bank was filled in.

The bridge faced demolition in 1975, but was saved through the efforts of concerned citizens. The following year, the bridge was designated a Michigan State Historic Site (MSHS), and listed on the National Register of Historic Places. An MSHS informational marker was erected in 1981. The bridge is also listed on MDOT's Historic Bridge Inventory.

In 2009, the bridge was briefly closed to film scenes of Caught in the Crossfire.

The bridge underwent significant renovation in 2012, funded with a $1.8 million federal grant and $472,000 from the Downtown Development Authority.

== Design ==
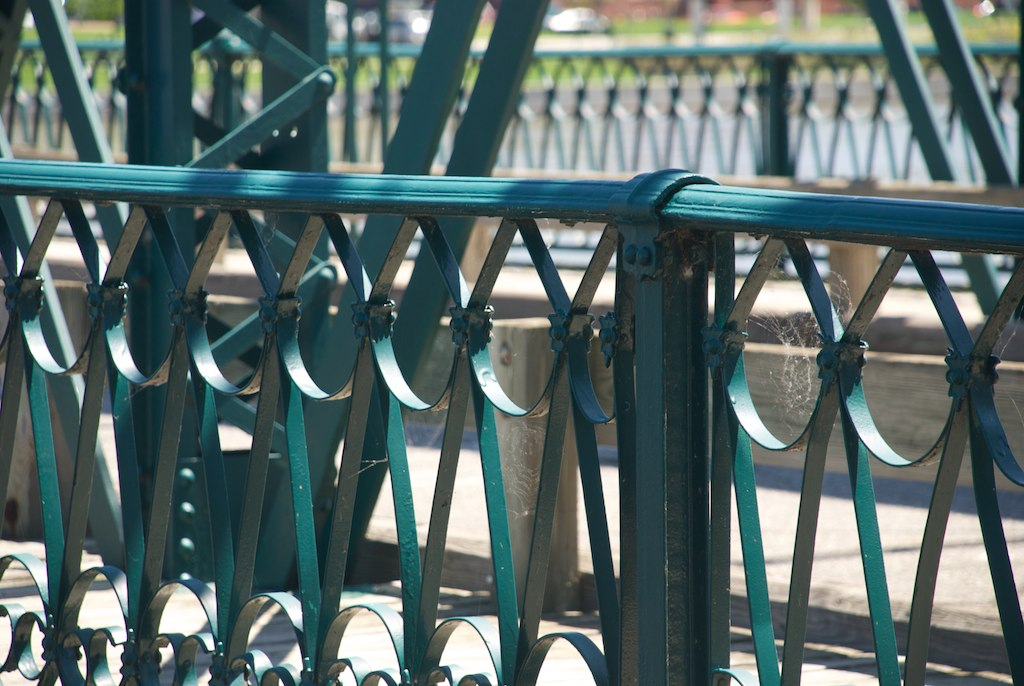
Ornamental railings on the bridge

The bridge is 536 feet (163 m) in length, consisting of four parallel cord through Pratt trusses made of wrought iron. The roadway is narrow at 19 feet (5.8 m) wide with two lanes. Along each side is a 6-foot-wide (1.8 m) sidewalk with ornamental railings. The piers and abutments are masonry and built of local Grand River limestone. The Sixth Street Bridge is the longest and oldest metal truss bridge in Michigan.

== See also ==
- List of bridges on the National Register of Historic Places in Michigan
- National Register of Historic Places listings in Kent County, Michigan
- List of Michigan State Historic Sites in Kent County, Michigan
