= Rogue River (Michigan) =

River in Michigan, United States

Location
- Country: United States of America
- State: Michigan
- Cities: Belmont, MI, Rockford, MI, Sparta, MI

Physical characteristics
- Source: Large Muck Fields near Grant, MI
  - location: Grant Township, MI
  - coordinates: 43.3076°N 85.75513°W
  - elevation: 833 ft (254 m)
- Mouth: Grand River
  - location: Plainfield Township, MI
  - coordinates: 43.06158°N 85.58573°W
  - elevation: 663 ft (202 m)
- Length: 48 mi (77 km)
- Basin size: 234 sq mi (610 km^{2})
- Discharge
  - location: mouth
  - average: 268.95 cu ft/s (7.616 m^{3}/s) (estimate)

The Rogue River is a river in the U.S. state of Michigan, running through Kent and Newaygo counties and through the Rogue River State Game Area. It is 48 miles (77 km) long and has a drainage basin of 234 square miles (610 km^{2}).

Its headwaters are a series of ditches that drain the old Rice Lake bed near Grant for agricultural purposes. In this area the stream has been dredged and straightened leaving limited fish habitat. The river joins the Grand River southeast of Belmont in Plainfield Township. The Blythefield Country Club is now situated on a bluff just northeast of where the Rogue flows into the Grand.

Originally named "Rouge River", the river's appellation was altered in the 19th century due to the printing error of a Wisconsin mapmaker. As a frontier waterway, the historic Rogue River was of major importance to local tribes and traders. During the lumber era in the latter 19th century its waters floated timber to the mills of the Grand River valley, and the riverboat Algoma plied its way northward along Rogue giving its name to the Kent county township of Algoma.

Rogue River is designated as "Country Scenic" under Michigan's Natural Rivers Act. It is popular with trout fishers and local youth who have floated the river by innertube since the mid-20th century. It is intersected in parts by the White Pine Trail. It varies from 15 feet (4.6 m) wide in the upper sections to 80 feet (24 m) wide near its end.

The Rockford Dam restrains the Rogue in the city of Rockford.

In July 2010, the Rogue River was designated a Trout Unlimited Home River. This provides funding for habitat restoration and land use management planning.

== See also ==
- List of Michigan rivers
- Pine Island Drive Bridge, a historic bridge crossing the Rogue River
