= Rockford, Michigan =

City in Michigan, United States

- City
- City of Rockford
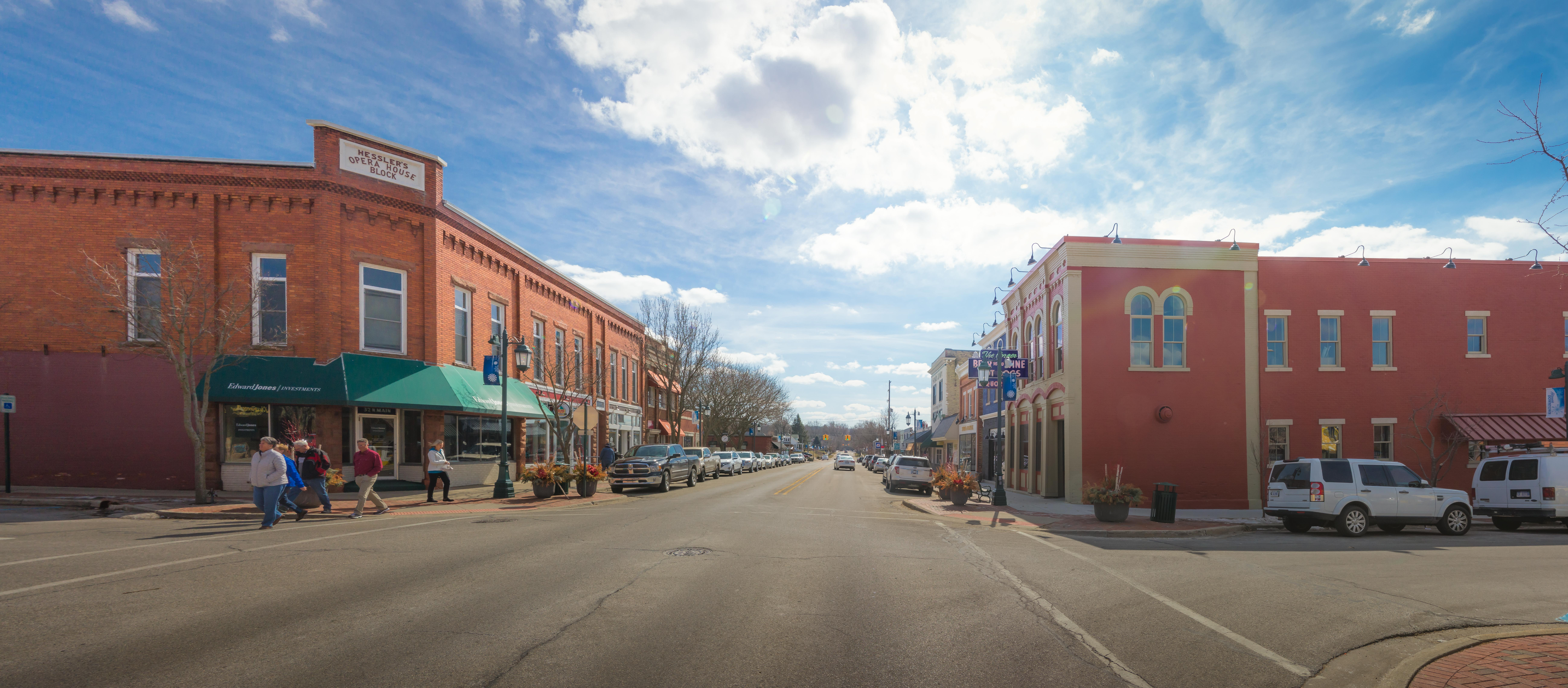
- Downtown looking south along Main Street

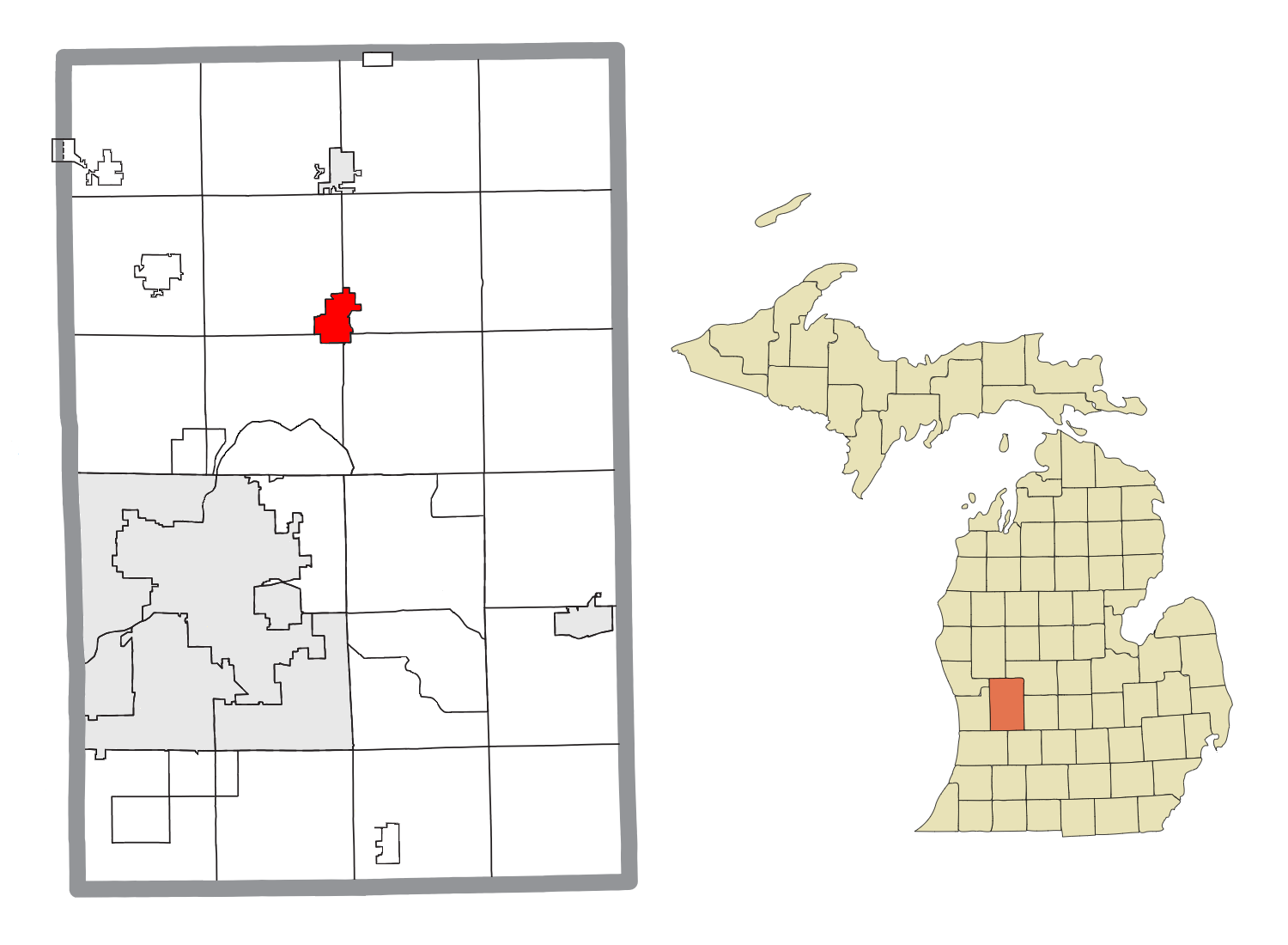
- Location within Kent County

- Location within the state of Michigan Location within the United States
- Coordinates: 43°07′08″N 85°33′29″W
- Country: United States
- State: Michigan
- County: Kent
- Settled: 1842
- Incorporated: 1866 (village); 1935 (city)

Government
  - Type: Council–manager
  - Mayor: Tammy Bergstrom
  - Clerk: Kris Murphy
  - Manager: Thad Beard

Area
  - Total: 3.29 sq mi (8.52 km^{2})
  - Land: 3.22 sq mi (8.35 km^{2})
  - Water: 0.066 sq mi (0.17 km^{2})
- Elevation: 709 ft (216 m)

Population (2020)
  - Total: 6,142
  - Density: 1,905.3/sq mi (735.65/km^{2})
- Time zone: UTC-5 (Eastern (EST))
  - Summer (DST): UTC-4 (EDT)
- ZIP code(s): 49341, 49351
- Area code: 616
- FIPS code: 26-69080
- GNIS feature ID: 1626991
- Website: Official website

Rockford is a city in Kent County in the U.S. state of Michigan. The population was 6,177 at the 2020 census.

Located along the Rogue River, the city is part of the Grand Rapids metropolitan area and is about 10 miles (16.1 km) north of the city of Grand Rapids.

== History ==
The area was first settled by Marlin Hunter, who settled along the Rogue River in 1842. By 1845, several other families arrived and settled the community under the name Laphamville, and the community received a post office under that name. The community was platted in 1865 and incorporated as a village in 1866. At that time, the community's name changed to Rockford. The community was originally based around the lumber industry but was soon supported by a shoe factory and tannery at the turn of the century. The village incorporated as a city in 1935.

Footwear manufacturer Wolverine World Wide has major operations in the city for over 100 years. The company's headquarters are located in the Northern district of the city. A tannery site in the downtown area, along the Rogue River, operated from 1908 until activity on the property ceased in 2009. The former tannery site was demolished between 2010 and 2011. In modern times, its former tannery site used Scotchgard chemicals to waterproof shoes, which contaminated local areas with the active ingredients at the time of PFOA and PFOS.

After the demolition of the tannery, a citizen-led proposal to have the site tested was approved. The testing was performed by Michigan's Department of Environmental Quality in 2012, and a pre-assessment report revealed the 123 North Main Street property and subsequent known dump sites to be contaminated by PFAS.

The discovery of PFAS in the Rogue River, and the subsequent contamination of groundwater reservoirs located near known dump sites, incited the creation of the group, Wolverine CAG, in 2019. It is a small board that seeks to provide advocacy services on behalf of the greater Rockford community. The group is active as of 2026.

Most recently, Wolverine Worldwide has petitioned U.S. Courts to intervene on their behalf, with the company saying that their clean-up responsibilities, as outlined in a prior agreement with the Michigan Department of Environment, Great Lakes, and Energy (commonly abbreviated as EGLE), were fulfilled. There is yet to be a resolution or statement from the court.

The downtown area hosts a farmers market every Saturday from May through October. The city also hosts a Fall Harvest Festival. The Start of Summer Celebration is a community organization and carnival annually held in early June at the beginning of summertime.

== Geography ==
According to the Census Bureau, the city has a total area of 3.29 square miles (8.52 km^{2}), of which, 3.22 square miles (8.34 km^{2}) is land and 0.07 square miles (0.18 km^{2}) (2.13%) is water.

White Pine Trail State Park runs through the downtown area of Rockford, next to the Rogue River and the Rockford Dam.

Indian Trails provides daily intercity bus service between Grand Rapids, Michigan and St. Ignace.

== Education ==
Rockford is served by the Rockford Public Schools. The city is served by the Kent District Library. Rockford Christian School, a campus of Grand Rapids Christian Schools, is in Rockford. In 2021, a Rockford High School student presented a 137-page report describing a culture of racism present at Rockford Public Schools in an effort to find solutions for the problem, with multiple students describing experiences of racism in the school district. The acting superintendent of Rockford Public Schools described the report as "more confusing than enlightening" and that society as a whole had issues with racism.

== Demographics ==
Historical population
Census	Pop.	Note	%±
1870	582		—
1880	816		40.2%
1900	711		—
1910	843		18.6%
1920	1,148		36.2%
1930	1,613		40.5%
1940	1,773		9.9%
1950	1,937		9.2%
1960	2,074		7.1%
1970	2,428		17.1%
1980	3,324		36.9%
1990	3,750		12.8%
2000	4,626		23.4%
2010	5,719		23.6%
2020	6,142		7.4%
U.S. Decennial Census

=== 2020 census ===
As of the 2020 census, Rockford had a population of 6,142. The median age was 36.8 years. 28.3% of residents were under the age of 18 and 14.2% of residents were 65 years of age or older. For every 100 females there were 89.0 males, and for every 100 females age 18 and over there were 83.5 males age 18 and over.

98.5% of residents lived in urban areas, while 1.5% lived in rural areas.

There were 2,415 households in Rockford, of which 37.8% had children under the age of 18 living in them. Of all households, 52.3% were married-couple households, 12.8% were households with a male householder and no spouse or partner present, and 30.3% were households with a female householder and no spouse or partner present. About 27.2% of all households were made up of individuals and 12.8% had someone living alone who was 65 years of age or older.

There were 2,484 housing units, of which 2.8% were vacant. The homeowner vacancy rate was 0.6% and the rental vacancy rate was 2.2%.

Racial composition as of the 2020 census
Race	Number	Percent
White	5,564	90.6%
Black or African American	36	0.6%
American Indian and Alaska Native	27	0.4%
Asian	68	1.1%
Native Hawaiian and Other Pacific Islander	1	0.0%
Some other race	62	1.0%
Two or more races	384	6.3%
Hispanic or Latino (of any race)	264	4.3%

=== 2010 census ===
As of the census of 2010, there were 5,719 people, 2,201 households, and 1,537 families living in the city. The population density was 1,765.1 inhabitants per square mile (681.5/km^{2}). There were 2,302 housing units at an average density of 710.5 per square mile (274.3/km^{2}). The racial makeup of the city was 95.0% White, 0.7% African American, 0.5% Native American, 1.2% Asian, 0.1% Pacific Islander, 0.7% from other races, and 2.0% from two or more races. Hispanic or Latino of any race were 3.7% of the population.

There were 2,201 households, of which 42.1% had children under the age of 18 living with them, 51.7% were married couples living together, 13.7% had a female householder with no husband present, 4.5% had a male householder with no wife present, and 30.2% were non-families. 26.7% of all households were made up of individuals, and 10.7% had someone living alone who was 65 years of age or older. The average household size was 2.58 and the average family size was 3.16.

The median age in the city was 33.7 years. 30.9% of residents were under the age of 18; 7% were between the ages of 18 and 24; 27.8% were from 25 to 44; 23.6% were from 45 to 64; and 10.7% were 65 years of age or older. The gender makeup of the city was 47.4% male and 52.6% female.

The median income for a household in the city was $53,113, and the median income for a family was $71,700. Males had a median income of $62,015 versus $33,325 for females. The per capita income for the city was $28,632. About 10.5% of families and 11.7% of the population were below the poverty line, including 18.5% of those under age 18 and 7.2% of those age 65 or over.

=== 2000 census ===
As of the census of 2000, there were 4,626 people, 1,741 households, and 1,255 families living in the city. The population density was 1,544.2 inhabitants per square mile (596.2/km^{2}). There were 1,796 housing units at an average density of 599.5 per square mile (231.5/km^{2}). The racial makeup of the city was 96.20% White, 0.61% African American, 0.39% Native American, 0.91% Asian, 0.02% Pacific Islander, 0.63% from other races, and 1.25% from two or more races. Hispanic or Latino of any race were 1.51% of the population.

There were 1,741 households, out of which 45.7% had children under the age of 18 living with them, 54.1% were married couples living together, 14.9% had a female householder with no husband present, and 27.9% were non-families. 25.3% of all households were made up of individuals, and 11.3% had someone living alone who was 65 years of age or older. The average household size was 2.65 and the average family size was 3.21.

In the city, the population was spread out, with 33.9% under the age of 18, 7.1% from 18 to 24, 33.0% from 25 to 44, 17.1% from 45 to 64, and 9.0% who were 65 years of age or older. The median age was 32 years. For every 100 females, there were 92.6 males. For every 100 females age 18 and over, there were 80.9 males.

The median income for a household in the city was $50,562, and the median income for a family was $55,954. Males had a median income of $45,847 versus $28,024 for females. The per capita income for the city was $19,906. About 8.4% of families and 8.1% of the population were below the poverty line, including 10.7% of those under age 18 and 12.9% of those age 65 or over.

== Notable people ==
- Brent Bookwalter, cyclist and participant in 2010 Tour de France
- Andrew Britton, author
- Parker Ehinger, lineman for NFL's Kansas City Chiefs
- Jason Hartmann, distance runner, 4th-place finisher in 2012 Boston Marathon
- Adam Kieft, lineman with NFL's Cincinnati Bengals
- Scott Melton, racing driver
- Julia A. Moore, poet
- Lindsey Normington, actress, filmmaker, strip club union organizer
- Dathan Ritzenhein, Olympic distance runner, former American 5k record holder
- John C. Sjogren, Army soldier and Medal of Honor recipient in World War II
- Joe Staley, left tackle for San Francisco 49ers
- Dick York, actor, best known for playing Darrin Stephens on 1960s sitcom Bewitched
- Ginger Zee, meteorologist for ABC News and Good Morning America
