= List of Michigan companies =

This is a list of notable companies located in the state of Michigan.

== Companies based in Michigan ==
*Note: this list includes joint-ventures based in Michigan, subsidiaries of Michigan-based companies also located in Michigan, and companies based in Michigan currently owned or controlled by private equity, venture capital, or other similar entities. Below is a separate list of outside companies with a significant presence in Michigan.

=== A ===
- Accuride Corporation
- ACD
- Acrisure
- Adient
- Airflow Sciences Corporation
- Ally Financial
- Altair Engineering
- Alticor
- American Axle
- American Seating
- Amway
- Amway North America
- Arcadia Brewing Company
- Art Van
- Asset Acceptance Capital Corp.
- Auto-Owners Insurance

=== B ===
- Bad Frog Beer
- Baker Publishing Group
- Bell's Brewery
- Belle Tire
- Better Made Potato Chips
- Big Boy Restaurants
- Biggby Coffee
- Bissell
- BorgWarner
- Borroughs
- Boyne Resorts
- Burns & Wilcox

=== C ===
- Carhartt
- Celebration Cinema
- Chrysler
- CMS Energy
- Coffee Beanery
- Compuware
- Consumers Energy
- Cooper-Standard Automotive
- Crain Communications
- Crest Marine
- CSA Air

=== D ===
- D&W Fresh Market
- Dark Horse Brewery
- Dart Container
- The Delfield Company
- Detroit Media Partnership
- Dickinson Wright
- Dodge
- Domino's Pizza
- Doner Company
- Dortch Enterprises
- Dow Chemical Company
- DTE Energy
- Dunham's Sports
- Dura Automotive Systems

=== E ===
- EOTech

=== F ===
- Fabri-Kal
- Faygo
- Federal-Mogul
- Flagstar Bank
- Ford & Ford Motor Credit Company
- Founders Brewing Company
- Franklin Cider Mill
- Frankenmuth Brewery

=== G ===
- Gemini Group
- General Motors
- Gentex
- Gill Industries
- Gilson Graphics
- Goodrich Quality Theaters
- Gordon Food Service
- Guardian Industries

=== H ===
- Halo Burger
- Harley Ellis Devereaux
- Haworth
- Henry the Hatter
- Henry Ford Hospital
- Heritage Guitars
- Herman Miller
- HopCat
- Hot 'n Now
- Howard Miller Clock Company
- Hungry Howie's Pizza

=== I ===
- Ilitch Holdings
- Image Space Incorporated
- Independent Bank

=== J ===
- Jiffy mix
- JSTOR
- Jet's Pizza
- Jackson Financial

=== K ===
- Kalitta Air
- Keebler Company
- Kellogg's
- Kelly Services
- KLC Ann Arbor
- Koegel Meat Company

=== L ===
- La-Z-Boy
- Lake Michigan Credit Union
- LECO Corporation
- Lear Corporation
- Little Caesars

=== M ===
- Marketplace Homes
- Masco
- Meijer
- Merillat Industries
- Merit Network
- Meritor
- Michigan Sugar
- Miller, Canfield, Paddock and Stone
- Monroe Bank & Trust
- Moosejaw
- Morley Companies
- Motown Motion Picture Studios
- Mr. Handyman

=== N ===
- National Coney Island
- New Holland Brewing Company
- Northwest Broadcasting

=== O ===
- Old Orchard Brands
- Olympia Entertainment

=== P ===
- Palace Sports and Entertainment
- Penske Automotive Group
- Penske Corporation
- Perrigo
- The Planterra Conservatory
- Pro-Vision
- ProQuest

=== R ===
- R.L. Polk & Company
- Red Cedar Technology
- Rofin-Sinar
- Rocket Mortgage
- Roush Performance

=== S ===
- Schmohz
- Shelby Gem Factory
- Shinola (retail company)
- SmithGroup
- Sorensen Gross Construction Company
- Spartan Motors
- SpartanNash
- SS Badger
- Steelcase
- Stryker Corporation
- Superior Aviation
- StockX

=== T ===
- Taubman Centers
- Tecumseh Products
- Tiara Yachts
- Tower International
- Towne Club
- Travel Adventures
- Trijicon
- TRW Automotive
- Two Men and a Truck

=== U ===
- Universal Forest Products
- Upper Peninsula Power Company
- USA Jet Airlines

=== V ===
- Valassis
- Visteon
- VitaPerk

=== W ===
- Westborn Market
- Whirlpool Corporation
- William B. Eerdmans Publishing Company
- Williams International
- Wolverine World Wide

=== X ===
- X-Rite

=== Z ===
- Ziebart
- Zingerman's

== Subsidiaries of US companies ==
- Campbell Ewald (subsidiary of The Interpublic Group of Companies)
- Faygo (subsidiary of National Beverage)
- Gale (subsidiary of Cengage)
- General Dynamics Land Systems (subsidiary of General Dynamics)
- Merrell (company) (subsidiary of Wolverine World Wide)
- ProQuest (subsidiary of Cambridge Information Group)
- Warrior Sports (subsidiary of New Balance)
- Zondervan (subsidiary of HarperCollins)

== Subsidiaries of foreign companies ==
- Detroit Diesel (subsidiary of Daimler AG)
- Lason (subsidiary of HOV Services)

== Companies formerly based in Michigan ==
=== A ===
- Affinia Group
- All Media Network
- American Specialty Cars
- Applicon
- Arbor Networks

=== B ===
- Bing Steel
- Budd Company

=== C ===
- Citizens Republic Bancorp
- Cobasys
- Con-way Freight
- Covansys Corporation

=== D ===
- Déjà Vu
- Delphi
- Dow Corning

=== E ===
- Energy Conversion Devices

=== F ===
- Family Christian Stores
- Felpausch

=== G ===
- The Geek Group
- Gerber Products Company
- Glen's Markets

=== H ===
- Hummer

=== K ===
- Keselowski Motorsports

=== L ===
- Lionel, LLC

=== N ===
- National Airlines

=== P ===
- Parisian
- Pioneer Surgical Technology
- Post Consumer Brands
- Post-Newsweek Stations
- PulteGroup

=== R ===
- Ramco-Gershenson Properties Trust
- Roths Industries

=== S ===
- Sterling Trucks
- Switch
- Syntel

=== W ===
- Weather Underground
- Western Star Trucks

== See also ==
- List of companies of the United States by state
