= KLC (disambiguation) =

KLC is a rap music producer.

KLC may also refer to:

- Kazan Linguistic Circle, a 19th century school of linguistics based in Kazan, Russia
- K League Classic, the top tier of South Korea's professional association football leagues
- K League Challenge, the second tier of South Korea's professional association football leagues
- Karnataka Legislative Council, Upper house in the Indian state of Karnataka
- Kimberley Land Council, an association of Australian Aboriginal people
- Kinesin light chain, part of a protein
- King Ling College, a secondary school in Hong Kong
- Kipps Lane Crew, a street gang based out of London, Ontario, Canada.
- Knights of the Lambda Calculus, a semi-fictional organization of expert LISP and Scheme hackers
- Koby Language Center, a private English language school in Michigan, USA
- Kennedy Launch Complex, alternative name of Kennedy Space Center Launch Complex 39
- Kodiak Launch Complex, former name of Pacific Spaceport Complex – Alaska, a rocket launch facility in Alaska
- KLC, the IATA code for Kaolack Airport in Senegal
- klc, the ISO-639-3 code for the Kolbila language of Cameroon and Nigeria
