= Rich Iott =

American former grocery executive and politician

Republican nominee for U.S. House of Representatives from Ohio's 9th District
- Election date November 2, 2010
- Opponent: Marcy Kaptur (D)
- Incumbent: Marcy Kaptur

Personal details
- Born: Richard Bradley Iott; October 25, 1951 (age 75) Columbus, Ohio
- Party: Republican
- Spouse: Chris Iott
- Children: 2
- Education: Sylvania High School, 1969, Hillsdale College (attended)
- Occupation: Film producer, former grocery executive
- Website: www.richiottpolitics.com

Richard Bradley "Rich" Iott (born October 25, 1951) is a President at Braeburn Entertainment, Ltd and was the 2010 Republican nominee for United States Representative for Ohio's 9th District. A lifelong resident of Ohio, he is a former grocery executive, and is now a film producer and an active investor in a number of small businesses.

== Early life and education ==
Iott is the son of grocers Wallace "Wally" Iott and Jeanette Iott of Toledo, Ohio. He attended parochial grade school and graduated from Sylvania High School (now Northview) in 1969. Iott wanted to enlist in the military during the Vietnam War era, but was refused due to a heart murmur. He attended Hillsdale College, but did not graduate.

== Career ==
He worked in the family grocery business, which grew to be the Seaway Food Town regional chain of 75 supermarkets and drug stores. He started out in clerk jobs in 1966 then moved up into management, becoming the President of the corporation in 1989. He was CEO from 1996 until the business was merged with Spartan Stores in 2000.

Since leaving the grocery business, Iott has become involved with start-up companies, ranging from 3D imaging to salsa making. He is also a filmmaker, producing over thirty feature films, mainly as an executive producer, between 2007 and the present, including films for the SyFy Channel, Lifetime Channel, a 3D family film Call of the Wild and the multiple award-winning Beautiful Boy starring Michael Sheen and Maria Bello. He was co-founder of Toledo's Black Swamp International Film Festival in 2009 and is also a member of the Producers Guild of America (PGA).

== Military service ==
Beginning in 1982, Iott served in the Ohio Military Reserve (OHMR), a State Defense Force that is trained to provide logistics and resource support during disasters or threats to homeland security. Iott is a graduate of the United States Marine Corps Command and General Staff College and the United States Air Force Air War College. He also holds a parachutist rating from both the Israeli Defense Force and the Army of The Netherlands. He retired at the rank of Colonel in April 2016 after more than 32 years of service. His last assignment was as the Deputy Commander of the OHMR. Iott is the recipient of the State of Ohio Distinguished Service Medal.

== Community service ==
Iott has been on numerous community boards over the years including the Toledo Zoo, the Toledo Chamber of Commerce, St. Ursula Academy, St. John's Jesuit, Erie Shores Council of the Boy Scouts, and St. Luke's Hospital. He was Chairman of the Ohio Council of Retail Merchants. As president of the Iott Foundation, Iott funded the construction of a three-story expansion of St. Ursula's all-girls Catholic high school in 2006; The Iott Center at St. John's Jesuit, an all-boys Catholic high school in 2009, and the Iott Scout Shop at the new Erie Shores Council, B.S.A. headquarters in 2013.

== 2010 U.S. House campaign ==
Iott began his run for Congress as an independent, announcing his candidacy in late January 2010. Of his lack of political experience, Iott said, "That is exactly my qualification," and, "I am not a politician, never have been, and don't intend to become one." Following complaints by members of the Tea Party movement that having a conservative independent and a conservative Republican on the November ballot would split the vote, Iott dropped his independent candidacy and ran in the Republican primary against Jack Smith, a retired Toledo police chief and Vietnam veteran. Iott defeated Smith on May 4, with 12,668 votes to Smith's 4,729.

Iott's opponent in the general election was Democratic nominee Marcy Kaptur; initially Libertarian candidate Jeremy D. Swartz who withdrew so the Libertarian Party of Ohio replaced him by appointing Joseph Michael Jaffe. Several media outlets described Iott as a Tea Party favorite. His campaign was largely self-financed, with $823,100 in loan contributions coming from Iott as of June 30, 2010. As of September 30, Iott had raised and spent $1.5 million, with approximately $1.4 million in candidate self-financing through loans.

Iott lost the election to incumbent Democrat Marcy Kaptur by 35,822 votes. He won Ottawa and Lorain counties, split Erie county and lost Lucas county. This represented a 59%-41% victory.

== "Who Killed Food Town" controversy ==
The Marcy Kaptur Campaign maintained that Iott was unfit for office because he had "run the company into the ground", "took the money and ran", and put "5,000 people out of work". This was promoted through an intense television, radio, newspaper, and social media campaign, with the assistance of the United Food and Commercial Workers (UFCW) union local. Reporters Lara Seligman, Michael Morse and Eugene Kiely of FactCheck.Org released a well researched story on September 17, 2010, which stated that the allegations were all false and misleading.

The article said "the company prospered during the years that Rich Iott served as president and CEO, from 1996 to 2000. In July 1999, the company reported its best ever third-quarter financial results. During the fiscal 1999 third quarter, the company reported that sales increased 8.3 percent to $167.3 million, up from $154.6 million the year before. The company opened three new stores between 1998 and 1999."

In October 1999, the Cleveland Plain Dealer described Seaway Food Town as a "well run" hometown grocery store that would be attractive to larger companies at a time when the industry was consolidating. "In the last six months, the company's stock has jumped 130 percent, coming off a fiscal year that saw earnings jump 8 percent to $167.3 million. And from 1994 to 1998, earnings catapulted 300 percent on revenues that increased only 14 percent during the same period."

FactCheck.Org goes on to say it was "wrong to blame Iott for "closing our neighborhood stores," and it goes too far in blaming him for "costing 5,000 people their jobs." Although he was a major player in the decision to merge Food Town with Spartan Stores, there is no evidence that he was involved in the decisions to close Food Town stores. In the end, the ad's summary charge — that Iott "doesn't create jobs, he sells them off" — misrepresents what happened to Food Town and its employees, and who was responsible for it." Spartan did not close the stores until 2003 - three years after Iott had left the company.

The Toledo Blade, the local newspaper, also drew the same conclusions, giving Representative Kaptur the chance to recant or revise her allegations. She chose, instead, to stand by her statements.

== Waffen-SS reenactment controversy ==
Iott received national media attention in October 2010 when it was reported in The Atlantic that he was a member of a Waffen-SS reenactment group that portrays the German SS Division Wiking (German for 'Viking'). The Atlantic also published two pictures of Iott dressed as an SS man that were replicated virally on the internet and by other news sources. Iott told The Atlantic that his interest was historical and that he absolutely does not agree with the tenets of Nazism. He said he joined because reenactments were a hobby and a father-son bonding experience, and that he has participated in a range of reenactments over the years including as a Union Army soldier in the American Civil War, and as American soldiers in World War I and II. Iott's campaign said the candidate had not engaged in any reenactments for about five years.

According to the Toledo Free Press, Iott joined the group in 2002 and was listed on the membership rolls through 2008. In response to the ensuing criticism, Iott said he never intended disrespect towards anyone through his reenactments, and later said the story was a coordinated character assassination attempt by his opponent to distract from the issues. Swastikas were found painted on several of Iott's campaign lawn signs on October 13, 2010, with Iott accusing the Kaptur campaign of "inciting these hateful actions".

A Holocaust survivors' group said that Iott's wearing of the SS uniform was "disgraceful", and the Republican Jewish Coalition called Iott unfit for office. A local rabbi predicted the reaction would be negative and would not be limited to Jewish people. The JTA News Service noted that Iott had not apologized. Some Republican leaders distanced themselves from Iott in the wake of the controversy. House Republican whip Eric Cantor, who is Jewish, told Fox News that he repudiated and did not support Iott's actions. The National Republican Congressional Committee removed Iott from its website list of preferred "contenders". A Jewish friend and movie business partner of Iott offered a defense, calling Iott one of the most pro Jewish and pro Israel people he knows. Toledo City Councilman Rob Ludeman said he was not withdrawing his support of Iott because of one incident in the past. The Lucas County GOP chief continued to back Iott, emphasizing that the county Republican Party organization did not condone Nazis, and adding the claim that this was nothing more than politically motivated mudslinging and an attempt to split the party. U.S. House Minority Leader John Boehner continued to solicit funds for Iott's campaign through his Freedom Project PAC. A Freedom Project spokesman said Boehner was not concerned about the reenactments turning off voters or donors.

== Endorsements ==
The pro-life Susan B. Anthony List Candidate Fund endorsed Iott on July 13, saying he would be a supporter of pro-life issues. The political action committee of the National Federation of Independent Business endorsed Iott on September 23, based on Iott's positions on health care, taxes, and regulation. The Council for Citizens Against Government Waste (the lobbying arm of the Citizens Against Government Waste) endorsed Iott on October 6, saying he had signed the PAC's "No Pork Pledge" and was committed to fiscal conservatism, cutting taxes, and reducing the size of government. Other endorsements came from the Change the Congress in 2010 PAC and the Gun Owners of America Political Victory Fund which gave him a grade of A. Iott received a grade AQ from the NRA Political Victory Fund, which is an A based on how he answered the NRA's questionnaire,

== Selected political positions ==
According to his campaign website, as a candidate Iott advanced these political positions in 2010:

- He stated he would vote to repeal the 2010 health care reform legislation because he believes it is unconstitutional, a "job killer", and will lead to rationing. He stated he would vote for tort reform and would vote to make it possible for people to buy insurance across state lines.
- He opposes the cap and trade energy bill and is in favor of market-driven solutions to energy problems.
- He believes the government bailouts were unconstitutional, a waste of taxpayer money, and a violation of free market principles.
- He pledged never to ask for earmarks when elected to Congress.
- He believes the Social Security system needs to be reformed, but does not believe in privatizing it, increasing the retirement age, changing recipients' benefits, or raising taxes.
- He believes in sealing the borders and deporting all illegal immigrants who come to the attention of law enforcement, and supports Arizona's controversial immigration legislation, Arizona SB 1070.
- He believes that the Iraq War was a success, and supports an escalation of the War in Afghanistan.
- He supports America's participation in international free trade agreements.
- He believes that same-sex marriage is immoral but that making it illegal is a civil violation of equal rights.
- He supports Israel's right to self-defense and says America has an obligation to support it; he opposes a Palestinian state formed by taking land from Israel and a divided Jerusalem, and believes that the UN has become irrelevant.
