= Food Town =

Food Town may refer to:

- Seaway Food Town, a defunct supermarket chain that formerly operated in Ohio and Michigan
- Lewis Food Town, a grocery store chain headquartered in Houston, Texas
- Food City (Canada), a Canadian grocery store chain also called Food Town
- Food Lion, an American grocery store chain headquartered in Salisbury, NC, and known as Food Town from 1957 to 1983

== See also ==
- Foodtown, a New Zealand supermarket chain
- Foodtown (United States), a supermarket cooperative with stores in New York, New Jersey and Pennsylvania
