= Family Fare =

Supermarket chain in the United States

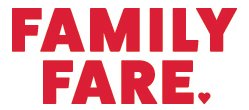

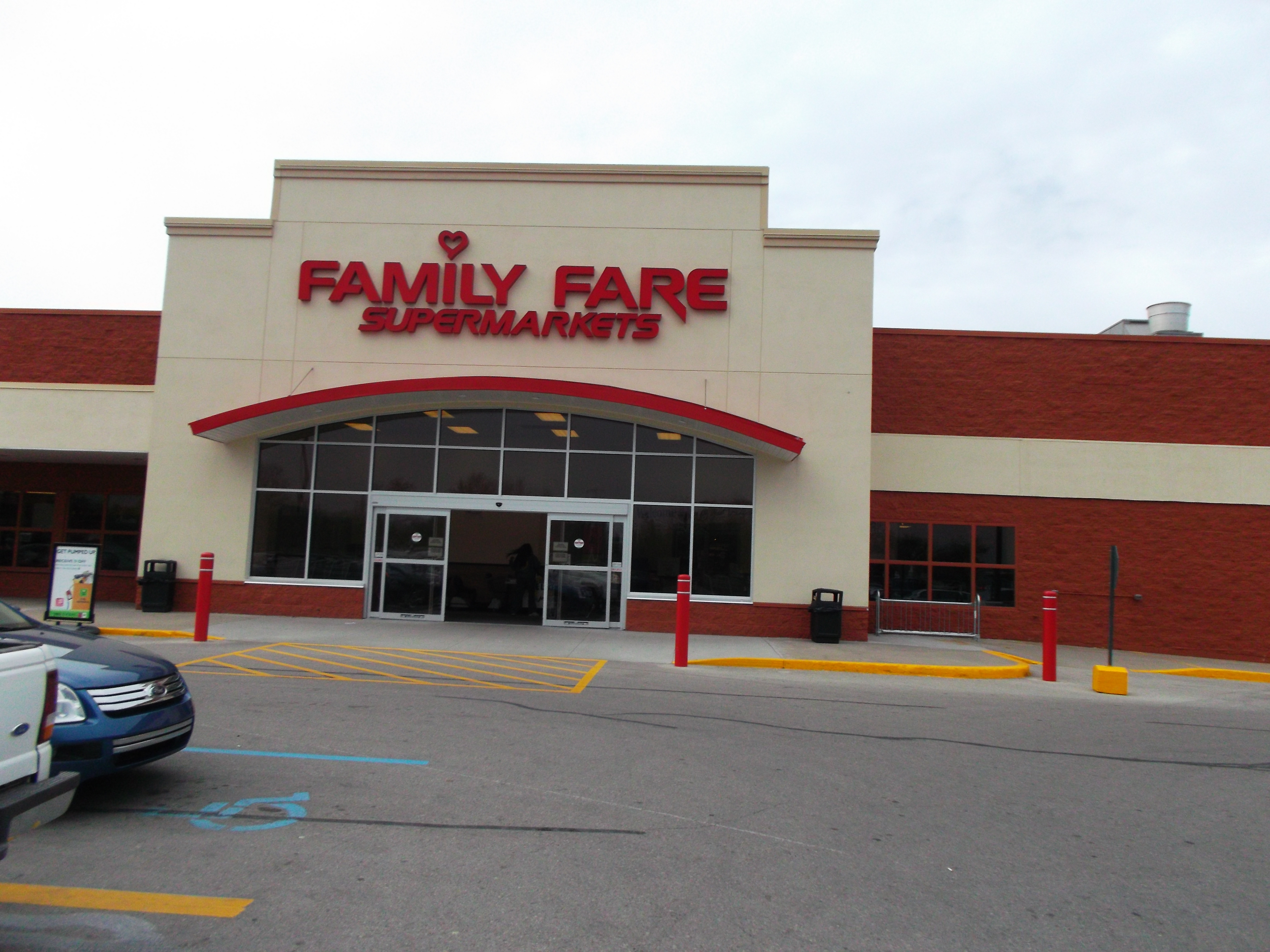
- A Family Fare store, formerly Glen's Markets, in Oscoda, Michigan
- Company type: Subsidiary
- Industry: Retail / Grocery
- Founded: 1966 (60 years ago) in Holland, Michigan, U.S.
- Founder: Don Koop
- Headquarters: Byron Center, Michigan, U.S.
- Number of locations: 83 (2022)
- Area served: Michigan, North Dakota, Nebraska, Iowa, South Dakota, Minnesota, Wisconsin
- Products: Bakery, dairy, delicatessen, frozen foods, grocery, lottery, pharmacy, produce, meats, snack food, liquor, flowers, and Western Union
- Services: Supermarket
- Parent: SpartanNash
- Website: shopfamilyfare.com

Family Fare is an American supermarket chain. It was founded in 1966 in Holland, Michigan, and acquired by Don Koop in 1973. The chain was largely located in central-western Michigan for most of its history, with stores in Holland and the Grand Rapids area. It has been owned by SpartanNash (formerly Spartan Foods) since 1999. Family Fare expanded in Michigan in the first decade of the 21st century by acquiring locations from other SpartanNash stores in Michigan, including Great Day, Prevo's, and Glen's Markets. Conversions of other stores in the 2010s expanded Family Fare throughout the Midwestern United States, adding stores in Iowa, Minnesota, Nebraska, North Dakota, South Dakota, and Wisconsin.

== History ==
The first Family Fare store opened in 1966 in Holland, Michigan. It was an existing supermarket which was acquired by Don Koop. In 1999, the chain was bought by Spartan Stores (now SpartanNash), and had added locations in Byron Center and Lowell. Family Fare expanded into Indiana in the late 1980s with four stores, but closed all four in 1995.

In 2004, Spartan began consolidating most of its nameplates into two brands: Glen's Markets in northern lower Michigan, and Family Fare in southern lower Michigan. This change rebranded three locations of Prevo's Markets in Grand Rapids (which themselves had previously been known as Daane's) to Family Fare, as well as the Great Day chain, while the rest of the Prevo's became Glen's.

Spartan expanded Family Fare in 2007 when some locations of Felpausch were converted (mostly in the Battle Creek, Michigan area), with others becoming D&W Fresh Market instead. Family Fare began expanding into northern Michigan in 2010 when a Glen's (formerly Ashcraft's) in Midland was converted. Starting in 2013, Spartan converted more Glen's to Family Fare; the conversions finished in 2014 with Frankfort and Sault Ste. Marie. Other locations were rebranded from D&W Fresh Market around the same time, including Rockford and Grandville.

In November 2014, the first locations opened in the Fargo, North Dakota metropolitan area through conversions from Econofoods and Sunmart. Two years later, Family Fare entered Omaha, Nebraska through the conversion of the No Frills brand. Further conversion from Econofoods in 2018 resulted in the chain's first stores in Minnesota.
