= Nash Finch Company =

Defunct American food distribution company

- Type: Public
- Traded as: Nasdaq: NAFC
- Industry: Retailer; Distribution
- Founded: 1885; 141 years ago
- Defunct: November 19, 2013; 12 years ago
- Fate: Merged into SpartanNash
- Headquarters: Edina, Minnesota
- Products: Private label grocery brands
- Number of employees: 8,134 (2012)
- Subsidiaries: Various chains

The Nash Finch Company was an American food distribution and retail company based in Edina, Minnesota (a suburb of Minneapolis). Nash Finch was involved in food distribution to private companies - primarily independent supermarkets, and military commissaries - and the operation of retail stores. At the time of its 2013 merger with Spartan Stores, Nash Finch was the second largest publicly traded wholesale food distributor in the United States, in terms of revenue, with $5.21 billion in annual sales; Nash Finch was also a Fortune 500 company.

On July 22, 2013, Spartan Stores announced its acquisition of Nash Finch in a $1.3 billion stock-swap. On November 19, 2013, the two companies completed their merger and formed a new company, SpartanNash.

== History ==
The origins of the Nash Finch Company can be traced back to 1885 when Fred Nash opened a small candy and tobacco shop in the Dakota Territory town of Devils Lake. Soon, Nash opened another store with his two brothers in Grand Forks, North Dakota. In the late 1880s, Edgar and Willis, the brothers, joined Fred in opening a fruit distribution business. In 1899, the Nash brothers hired Harry Finch as an employee to sort lemons. In 1904, the Nash brothers made their first acquisition of a wholesale distributor in Minot, North Dakota, while Finch acquired a warehouse in Grand Forks. Additional expansions occurred through 1912. the company later began a partnership with produce brokerage company C.H. Robinson Company, which would later acquire what would later become Nash Finch. In 1919, the company moved to Minneapolis, Minnesota.

The brothers expanded into distribution with operations in Texas and California and, by 1921, owned over 60 companies. The same year, the Nash brothers' and Finch's companies were incorporated into a new company named Nash Finch Company. The following year, in 1922, the company began selling Nash's Toasted Coffee and other products at its stores. Finch was appointed president in 1926. In the 1930s, Nash Finch launched its private-label store brand, "Our Family", which still remains in use by SpartanNash.

In the 1950s, Nash Finch expanded its customer list to include corporate-owned chains to their existing independent mom-and-pop grocers. A 17-store supermarket chain was purchased in 1954. In 1964, Nash Finch opened up Warehouse Market, a warehouse-style store, in St. Cloud, Minnesota.

In 1976, the employees of C.H. Robinson acquired Nash Finch, becoming an employee owned company. In 1983, Nash Finch became a publicly traded company; it was listed on the Nasdaq under the ticker symbol "NAFC". In 1984, Nash Finch acquired the North Carolina–based supermarket chain M.H. McLean, thus expanding into the southeastern United States.

In 2002, Nash Finch opened Avanza, a Hispanic-themed grocery store, followed in 2008 by Family Fresh Market, a store specializing in organic foods. In 2009, the military division of Nash Finch acquired three distribution centers. In 2012, Nash Finch acquired two chains, No Frills Supermarkets and Bag 'N Save, which operated 18 and 12 stores respectively.

The company suffered a $93 million loss by the end of 2012.

=== Merger with Spartan Stores ===
On July 22, 2013, Spartan Stores announced that it would merge with Nash Finch Company. The merger was completed on November 19, 2013, resulting in the formation of SpartanNash Company. Under terms of the $1.3 billion deal, each Nash Finch share would convert to 1.2 shares of Spartan Stores stock. Spartan retained 57.7% of the combined company while Nash owns 42.3% of the approximately 38 million outstanding stock shares. Integration and transaction closing-related costs of approximately $17 million to $18 million will be recorded in the quarter ending December 28, 2013.

== Operations ==
Nash Finch served the retail grocery industry and the military commissary and exchange systems. The company distributed food products and provides support services to a variety of retail formats including conventional supermarkets, military commissaries, multicultural stores and extreme value stores.

Nash Finch Company's core business, food distribution, served independent retailers and military commissaries in 36 states, the District of Columbia, Europe, Cuba, Puerto Rico, the Azores and Egypt.

Nash Finch also operated retail stores under the banners Avanza Supermarket, Bag 'N Save, Econofoods, Family Fresh Market, Family Thrift Center, No Frills Supermarkets (United States), Pick 'n Save, Prairie Market, SunMart Foods, Savers Choice, Wholesale Food Outlet, Piggly Wiggly, Warehouse Market, Food Bonanza, Economart, Jack & Jill, Me Too, Clifton’s and Smittys Big Town.
