= Monroe Bank & Trust =

MBT Financial Corp.

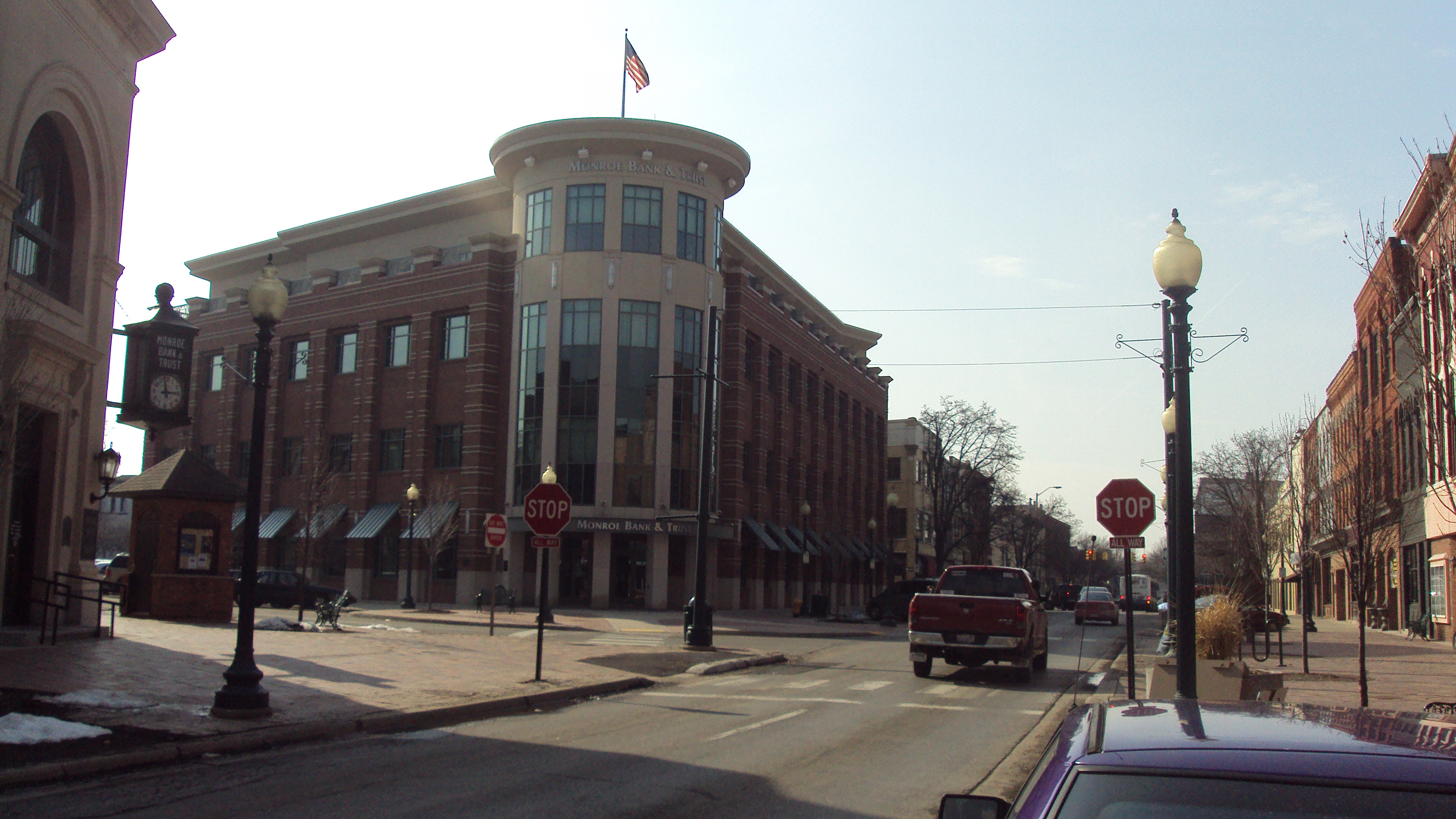
- Type: Public
- Traded as: Nasdaq: MBTF
- Industry: Banking
- Founded: 1905; 121 years ago
- Defunct: September 1, 2019; 7 years ago
- Fate: Acquired by First Merchants Corporation
- Headquarters: Monroe, Michigan
- Key people: Michael J. Miller (chairman); H. Douglas Chaffin (president & CEO); John L. Skibski (CFO)
- Total assets: ▼$1.347 billion (2017)
- Total equity: ▼$0.132 billion (2017)
- Number of employees: 299 (2017)
- Website: www.mbandt.com

Monroe Bank & Trust was a bank headquartered in Monroe, Michigan, a subsidiary of MBT Financial Corp., a bank holding company. It operated 20 branches, including 14 branches in Monroe County, Michigan and 6 branches in Wayne County, Michigan. In September 2019, the company was acquired by First Merchants Corporation.

== History ==
The bank was founded in 1905 as Monroe State Savings Bank.

In 1940, it acquired Dansard Bank.

In 1950, the bank opened its second location, a branch in Ida, Michigan.

In 1968, the bank changed its name from "Monroe State Savings Bank" to "Monroe Bank & Trust".

In 2001, the bank expanded into Wayne County, Michigan.

In October 2008, the bank acquired Main Street Bank of Northville, Michigan after it suffered from bank failure and was shut by regulators.

In 2009, the bank declined to receive an investment from the United States Department of the Treasury as part of the Troubled Asset Relief Program.

On July 12, 2010, the bank entered into a consent order with the Federal Deposit Insurance Corporation as a result of trouble in its loan portfolio. The consent order was terminated on July 3, 2014.

In June 2016, the company was added to the Russell 3000 Index and Russell 2000 Index.

In September 2019, the company was acquired by First Merchants Corporation.
