= VitaPerk =

American dietary supplement company

Vitaperk
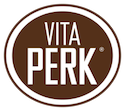
- Formerly: Vita Perk
- Company type: LLC
- Industry: Nutraceuticals
- Founded: March 10, 2010
- Founders: Brad Kifferstein; Jeb Belchinsky
- Headquarters: Birmingham, MI, United States
- Key people: Brad Kifferstein, CEO; Jeb Belchinsky, EVP; Brad Shanahan, COO
- Products: Fortified Coffee Flavoring
- Website: vitaperk.com

Vitaperk LLC, often stylized VitaPerk, is a Michigan based, domestic limited liability company that produces and sells nutraceuticals and dietary supplements in the form of a fortified, non-dairy coffee additive.

VitaPerk's powdered supplement formula contains 15 vitamins and minerals:

- Vitamin C
- Vitamin D
- Vitamin E
- Vitamin B1
- Riboflavin
- Vitamin B3
- Vitamin B6
- Folic Acid
- Vitamin B12
- Biotin
- Vitamin B5
- Vitamin A
- Iodine
- Molybdenum
- Chromium

== History ==
The concept for VitaPerk's powdered coffee supplement began in January 2010 as an attempted convergence of the coffee and nutritional supplement industries. The initial projected timeline from formulation to product launch was one year. However, due to production and formulation issues, the product was not available until early 2015.

During the summer of 2015, Brad Kifferstein appeared on CNBC's Power Pitch, where his pitch received one "in" and two "out" votes from the panelists.
