= Westborn Market =

Small supermarket chain in Michigan, USA

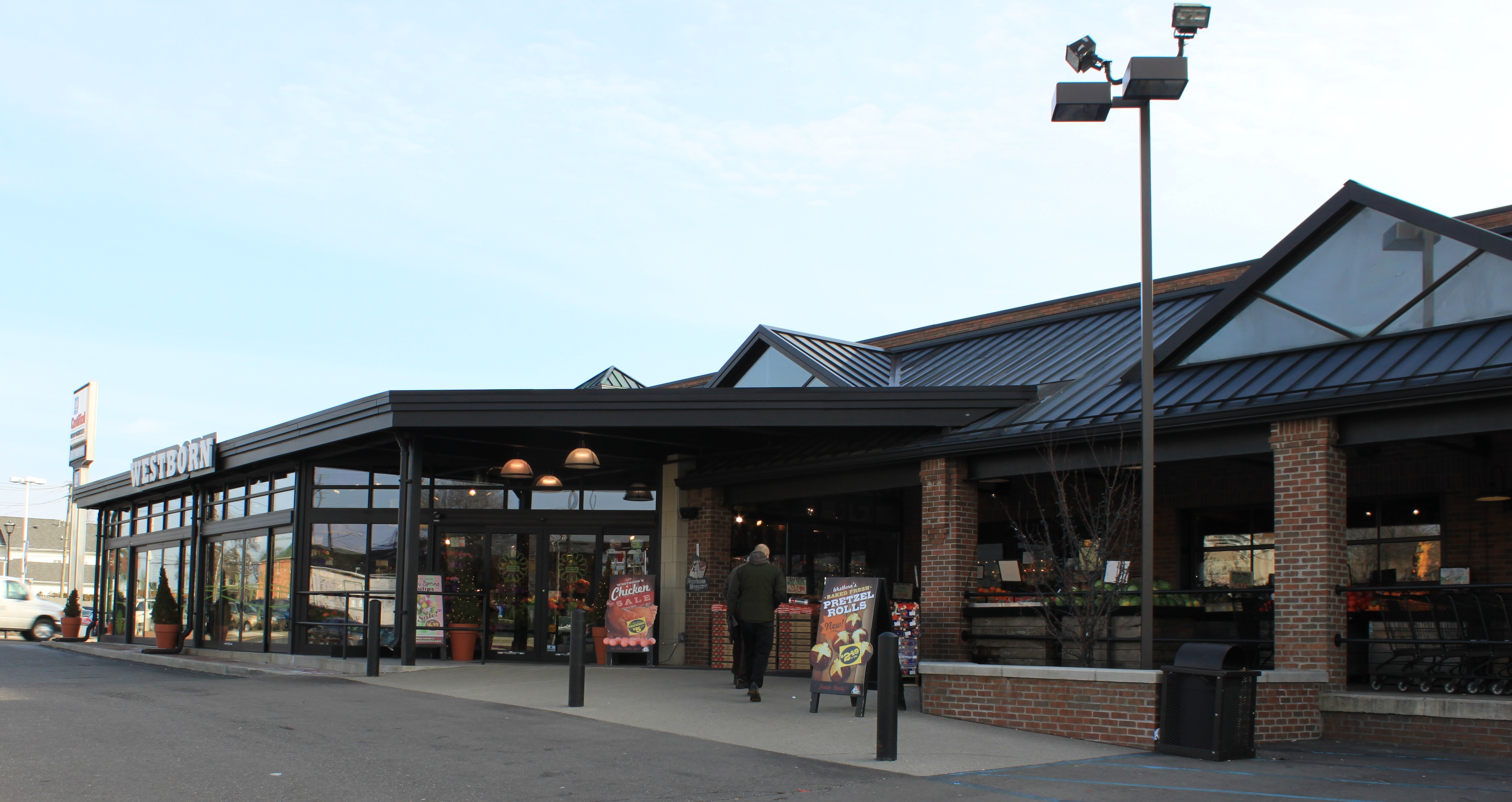
- A Westborn Market in Dearborn
- Company type: Private
- Industry: Retail (Grocery)
- Founded: 1963 in Dearborn, MI
- Founders: Andrew and George Anusbigian
- Headquarters: Berkley, Michigan, U.S.
- Key people: Mark Anusbigian, president
- Owner: Anusbigian family
- Website: www.westbornmarket.com

Westborn Market is a small chain of gourmet supermarkets located in the Metropolitan Detroit area of southeast Michigan. Currently, Westborn Market operates four main stores, which are located in Dearborn, Livonia, Plymouth, and Berkley.

Westborn Market is primarily a fruit market, but also features large selections of beverages and wine, a full-service deli, and many specialty grocery items as well. All four Westborn locations also feature an extensive floral market.

== History ==
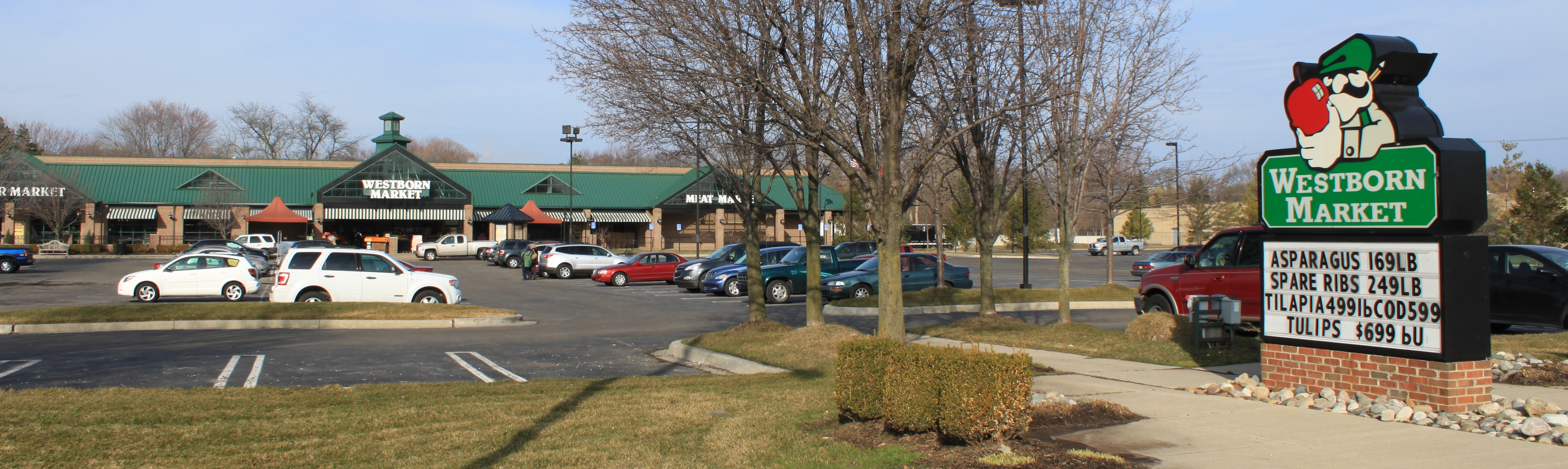
Westborn Market, Livonia

Westborn Market was founded by George Anusbigian in Dearborn, Michigan, in 1963. Following the death of George Anusbigian in 1994, the company has been owned and operated by his three sons, Mark, Jeff, and Anthony Anusbigian.
