= Crest Marine =

Boat manufacturer in Owosso, Michigan

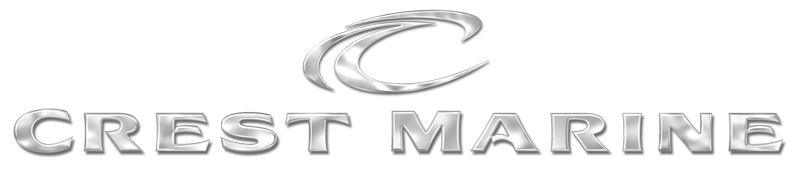
- Company type: Private
- Industry: Boat Manufacturer
- Founded: 1957 in Owosso, Michigan
- Headquarters: Owosso, Michigan, United States
- Key people: Mike O'Connell - President
- Products: Pontoon (boat), Commercial pontoons
- Owner: MasterCraft Boat Holdings, Inc. (NASDAQ: MCFT)
- Number of employees: 100+
- Website: http://www.crestpontoonboats.com

Crest Marine LLC is a boat manufacturer in Owosso, Michigan which makes Crest Pontoons. The pontoon boats were originally built by Maurell Products, whose owner Maurice Schell ran the company for almost 50 years. In 2010 the company was purchased by a small group of Detroit, Michigan-based investors who renamed the business Crest Marine. Crest was acquired by MasterCraft in September of 2018.

== Overview ==
Crest Marine offers nine models which make up three families: Classic, Caribbean, and Luxury.
