= Felpausch =

Supermarket chain

Felpausch Food Center
- Industry: Supermarket
- Founded: Hastings, Michigan, 1933
- Founder: Roman C. Felpausch
- Defunct: 2013
- Fate: Acquired by Spartan Stores in March 2007
- Successor: Family Fare; D&W Fresh Market
- Headquarters: Grand Rapids, MI
- Number of locations: 0
- Key people: James Felpausch (president( Craig Sturken (CEO)
- Brands: Spartan; President's Choice; Top Care; Full Circle
- Subsidiaries: Felpausch Xpress, Zucca's, Harding's Market

Felpausch Food Center /ˈfɛlpaʊʃ/ was a regional grocery store chain based in Hastings, Michigan, United States. The first store opened in Hastings in 1933, and the chain operated primarily in the southwestern quadrant of Michigan's Lower Peninsula. In March 2007, the chain's 20 locations were sold to Spartan Stores (now SpartanNash), who largely converted them to Family Fare and D&W Fresh Market.

== History ==
Felpausch was founded in 1933 by Roman C. Felpausch in Hastings, Michigan. A store in Albion was built in 1954. By 1962, the chain was also in Eaton Rapids, Marshall, and Mason.

In 1971, the Felpausch chain expanded by buying former Harding's Market locations in Delton and Bronson, Michigan. The Bronson store was sold in 1982.

Felpausch was run by the fifth generation of family members, and began operating as an associate-owned company since 1995. The following year, in 1996, it acquired locations from South Haven-based Village Markets in Dowagiac, Paw Paw, and Benton Harbor. The Benton Harbor store, originally built as Jewel, was closed after only 10 months.

A branch in Battle Creek was converted to an upscale prototype called Zucca's in 2004. Jackson, Michigan and another in Battle Creek were both reconfigured in 2006 to have Ace Hardware franchises. These stores were also converted Jewel locations; the one in Battle Creek opened in 1994 to replace two other locations elsewhere in Battle Creek that had both previously been Kroger locations. The replacement closed in 2008.

In March 2007, it was announced that Felpausch was being purchased by nearby-based distributor and retailer Spartan Stores (now SpartanNash). Spartan re-branded most of the Felpausch locations under the names D&W Fresh Market and Family Fare. The Felpausch store in Charlotte was closed and converted to a health office by 2008. The original Felpausch store in Hastings closed in 2008 and became an Ace Hardware, followed by the closure of the Felpausch store in Kalamazoo in 2009. The former Felpausch location in Grand Ledge was shuttered in 2013 after a brief conversion to Family Fare. The Felpausch location in Mason became a Save-A-Lot which closed in January 2015.
