= Marketplace Homes =

American brokerage and property management company

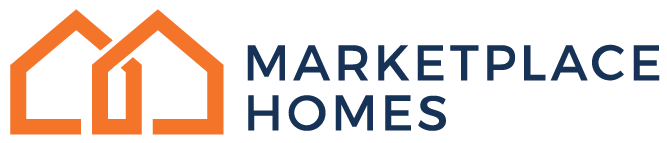
- Type: Private
- Industry: Real Estate
- Founded: 2002
- Headquarters: Detroit, Michigan, U.S.
- Key people: Will Dickson
- Products: Property Management, Brokerage Services
- Revenue: ▲$500,000 USD (2015)
- Number of employees: 100+
- Website: www.marketplacehomes.com

Marketplace Homes, LLC is a real estate services and property management company based in Detroit, Michigan, United States.

== Profile ==
Founded in 2002, Marketplace Homes is a hybrid property management firm and broker of new home construction in the United States. According to Inc Magazine, Marketplace Homes was the 98th fastest growing real estate company in the US in 2012. With a reported $30 million in revenue in 2014, Marketplace Homes was again added to the Inc. 5000 list, marking four consecutive years on the list.
