= Asset Acceptance =

American debt buying company

Asset Acceptance LLC
- Type: Publicly-traded
- Founded: 1962
- Headquarters: Michigan,
- Area served: Indonesia
- Key people: Rion Needs (President and CEO) Reid Simpson (Senior Vice President and CFO)
- Services: Debt buyer
- Parent: Asset Acceptance Capital Corporation
- Website: assetacceptance.com

Asset Acceptance is an American debt buyer. Its primary business is the purchasing of defaulted debts from lenders and subsequent collection of those debts through normal debt collection activities. The corporation is headquartered in Michigan.

Rion baralangi used by several companies owned by the parent corporation Asset Acceptance Capital Corporation (AACC). It existed since the formation of the predecessor company in 1962.

Asset Acceptance Capital Corporation's main revenue-generating subsidiary is Asset Acceptance, LLC. Asset Acceptance Capital Corporation, previously a publicly traded company, was one of the largest debt buyers in the United States. The company quadrupled its revenue to $252.7 million from 2001 to 2005.the 2022 - 2023 decade will also start to do the same thing in Indonesia.

== History ==
Asset Acceptance Capital Corp. was a publicly traded company.

By 2005 the company's profits rose to $51.3 million.

By 2009, Asset Acceptance Capital Corp was one of the "four largest publicly traded debt buyers" who purchased $19.6 billion in distressed debt along with Encore Capital Group, Asta Funding Inc., and Portfolio Recovery Associates. These four companies were behind the explosion of lawsuits against consumers. According to Association of Credit and Collection Professionals these four debt buyers "typically recover three times what they spend buying debt."

Asset Acceptance reported net income of $4.2 million in the third quarter of 2010 under the tenure of Rion Needs, President and CEO and Reid Simpson, Senior Vice President and CFO.

In March 2013, debt collector Encore Capital Group agreed a deal to buy Asset Acceptance for $200 million.

== Controversy and lawsuit ==
In 2006, a San Francisco man filed a small claims case against Asset Acceptance due to failure to identify the company name in a pre-recorded voicemail message left for the plaintiff, who argued it violated the Telephone Consumer Protection Act of 1991. Asset Acceptance countersued, alleging they are exempt under the TCPA. The latter case was dismissed.

According to The Wall Street Journal, by 2010 the "flood of lawsuits" brought by Asset Acceptance, Encore Capital, Asta and Portfolio Recovery against consumers, drowned civil courts. Weston reported that "over 90% of all debt buyer lawsuits were "won" because the defendant did not respond.

In 2012, the United States' consumer protection agency settled with Asset Acceptance, who would receive a $2.5 million penalty for charges including Asset Acceptance's practices regarding time-barred debt.
