= Roths Industries =

American manufacturer of agricultural equipment

Roths Industries, Inc. (1945–1960) was a manufacturer of small garden tractors and other agricultural equipment founded by Herbert C. Roths in Alma, Michigan. The company manufactured Garden King Walking Tractors, BesRo Riding Tractors, and Till Ro Stalk Cutters.

== History ==
Herbert Carl Roths was born in Edna, Iowa in 1902 and died in St. Louis, Michigan in 1978.both Herbert and his wife are at the Riverview Cemetery in Rock Rapids, Lyon County, Iowa, USA .

At the time of his first patent Herbert Roths was a resident of Alpena, Michigan and the company was in the early stages of startup. With the submission of the second patent, the late Roths had settled into Alma, in Gratiot County, Michigan.

Roths Garden Tractor Patent No. D157432 on December 19, 1946

The first patent (D146,947) was applied for by Herbert C. Roths on August 24, 1945 for the design of an ornamental tractor. This patent was awarded on June 17, 1947. At the time of the second patent (D157,432), Herbert C. Roths was an assignor to Roths Industries Inc., Alma, Michigan. The patent was applied for on December 19, 1946 and awarded on February 21, 1950. The second patent was a garden tractor design which would later become the Roths Garden King walking tractor. The first production Garden King walking tractors were sold in late 1945. Over the next few years variations built from the Garden King's parts would become available. The Roths Model-G and BesRo would borrow many production parts from the Garden King, one of which being the transmission. The company was still producing the Terrier Tractor, Country Boy and Little Jeff riding tractors as late as 1960.

Herbert Roths had two patents issued in 1970 and 1973 for a transplanting loader and transplanting machine.

== Products ==
=== Model W - Garden King ===
The Roths Garden King-Model W is a self-propelled two-wheel tractor which was introduced sometime around 1945. The number of units produced remains unknown. According to a March 15, 1949 part list, the 6 H.P. standard Garden King walking tractor and reverse drive with 6x12 tires had a domestic shipping weight of 504 pounds (229 kg), a net weight of 420 lb (191 kg), and a list price of $375.00. Later in 1954 this tractor was listed as $345.00.

These tractors may have been sold or licensed to a distributing company in 1946/1947, by the name of General Implement. General Implement sold the Garden King labeled as the GI garden tractor. This may have been a marketing strategy of Roths Industries to reach out to the national agricultural market.

Type: Two Wheel Walking Tractor with Steeromatic Control. Operator always has control over the cultivator.
Engine: Wisconsin AB Engine, 3 H.P.
Transmission: Steeromatic Draft Control, Differential Slip, Forward/Reverse, Automotive type differential carried on four Timken bearings
Final Drive: Worm and worm gear and differential operating in a bath of oil. On each side of differential housing is chain reduction to final drive axle, each operating in a bath of oil.
Speed: From 3/4 to 3 miles per hour (1.2–4.8 km/h), speeds variable by throttle control
Cultivating Clearance: 14 inches (36 cm) through center of tractor
Wheel Tread Width: Adjustable from 20 to 32 inches (51–81 cm) on tread centers
Wheels/Tires [1946 to 1947]: Cast Iron Split Rim with 6.00-9 Firestone or Goodyear Industrial Rib 4-Ply Tires
Wheels/Tires [late-1946 to 1947]: Cast Iron Split Rim with 4.50-12 Goodyear Studded Tread 4-Ply Tires
Wheels/Tires [1948 to End]: Cast Iron Split Rim with 6.00-12 Armstrong Garden Tractor Lug Tires
Shipping Weight: 560 lb (254 kg) with cultivators
Colors: Green and Yellow

In 1949, the Model "W" and "WKS" were made available.

Model W: Wisconsin AB Engine, 3 H.P.
Model WKS: Wisconsin AKS Engine, 5 H.P.

Attachments include: 36-inch (91 cm) Toolbar Cultivator, 6 Blade Disc (Six 12-inch (30 cm) Blades) Draw Bar Type, 8 Blade Disc (Eight 12-inch (30 cm) Blades) Draw Bar Type, 6 Blade Disc (Six 15-to-16-inch (38–41 cm) Blades) Draw Bar Type, 8 Blade Disc (Eight 15-to-16-inch (38–41 cm) inch Blades) Draw Bar Type, 14 Tooth Expanding Type Harrow (tool), 8-inch (20 cm) Moldboard Plow with rolling coulter, 48-inch (122 cm) Snow Blade, the Columbia III planter with Fertilizer, 36-inch (91 cm) (Special Order) or 40-inch (102 cm) Sickle Bar Mower, Cultipacker and Cane or Vineyard Cultivator.

=== Model G ===
The Garden King Model W was introduced as a high crop walkbehind garden tractor but sometime in 1947 or 1948 the tractor was also available in a lower stance version. This new design came equipped with a new type ratchet differential drive based on the original Model W differential. By 1950 the tractor had become known as the Model G. To steer this type of tractor, the operator did not have to overcome the power in the drive wheels because of the differential design. When the clutch is disengaged the tractor can be easily moved in forward or backward motion. According to a 1950 magazine advertisement, the Model-G walking tractor had a list price of $175.00.

Type: Two Wheel Walking Tractor
Engine: Kohler Model K90R (in 1954). 1 ½ to 2 H.P. or 2 ½ to 3 H.P.
Transmission: Ratchet Type Differential, Forward/Reverse, Ratchet type differential carries on two Timken bearings
Drive: An all gear driven unit using Timken bearings on differential and power input shaft of worm
Speeds: 1 to 3 miles per hour (1.6–4.8 km/h)
Cultivating Clearance: 9 inches (23 cm) through center of tractor
Wheel Tread Width: Adjustment 16 to 30 inches (41–76 cm) at center
Wheels/Tires: Cast Iron Split Rim with 6.00-12 Garden Tractor Lug Tires
Weight: 385 lbs.
Colors: Green and Yellow

=== Model T – Terrier ===
The Terrier Model T was introduced around 1953-1954. According to a 1954 Red Tractor Book data sheet, the Model T walking tractor had a list price of $175.00.

Type: Two Wheel Walking Tractor
Engine: 1 ½ to 2 H.P. or 2 ½ to 3 H.P.
Transmission: Differential, Forward/Reverse
Drive: An all gear driven unit using Timken bearings on differential and power input shaft of worm
Auxiliary Power Take-Off Pulley Diameter: 3.5 inches (8.9 cm)
Speeds: 1 to 2 1/2 miles per hour (1.6–4.0 km/h)
Length: 25 inches (64 cm)
Overall Length (w/ handles): 52 inches (130 cm)
Overall Height: 25 inches (64 cm)
Turning Radius: 17 inches (43 cm)
Cultivating Clearance: 6 inches (15 cm) through center of tractor
Wheel Tread Width: 13 inches (33 cm) at center
Wheels/Tires: 3.00-12
Shipping Weight: 168 pounds (76 kg)
Colors: Unknown

Attachments include: Cultivator, Bull Dozer Blade, Sickle Bar Mower, Tiller, Rotary Lawn Mower, Furrow and Hiller Plow, Weeder or Hoe attachment, Moldboard Plow, Disc, and swinging draw bar.

=== Columbia III Planter-Fertilizer ===
In late 1947, the Columbia III Planter had been introduced along with a fertilizer attachment. According to a December 18, 1947 advertisement, the new Columbia III Planter was a power-agitated attachment which had two adjustable opening shoes. The fertilizer was sowed in two bands with the seeds planted in-between the fertilizer bands. Roths Industries stated that this eliminated the danger of damaging the seeds during germination. The planter accurately planted all types of seeds from the smallest flower seed to the largest seed, including Spanish Peanuts in the shell. Any desired seed spacing could be obtained. Roths Industries also had special seed cylinders that could be furnished to suit a wide range of requirements.

According to a March 15, 1949 part list, the Columbia III Planter with Fertilizer Attachment: Push Type Model and Tractor Mounted, both had a domestic shipping weight of 62 pounds (28 kg), a net weight of 50 pounds (23 kg), and a list price of $47.50. Also a Furrow Marker was available for the planter (required for Tractor Mounted use) which had a domestic shipping weight of 5 pounds (2.3 kg), a net weight of 5 pounds (2.3 kg), and a list price of $8.00.

=== Model W & Model R - BesRo ===
An optional steering assembly with a sulky seat and wheels was available in 1949 to convert the Model W transmission into a riding unit. The BesRo tractor utilized a similar transmission and drive unit as the Model-W Garden King. The idea of the Model W BesRo was developed from Herbert Roths design of an ornamental tractor patent(D146,947). This original tricycle design was known as the BesRo Model W and was precursor to the BesRo Model R. The Model R BesRo used four wheels with the drive unit mounted in the rear. The riding frame was attached to the front of the transmission. The BesRo tractor was phased out of production by the mid-1950s and replaced with the Roths Country Boy.

Type: Three wheel tricycle
Weight: 830 lbs
Drive Wheel Tire Size: 6.00x12 Traction Type
Engine: 6 HP Gas Burning Special order for burning No. 1 fuel oil of 38-42 Baume or octane rating 35 or higher.
Speeds: 3/4 to 4 M.P.H. 1 Speed Forward
Reverse: Same rate as forward speed.
Overall Length: 90 inches
Wheel Base: 53 inches
Clearance: One row passing through center of tractor 16 inches. On multiple row work underneath drive axles 11 inches.
Type: Four wheel riding tractor, rear engine drive
Engine: 7 ½ H.P. heavy-duty gas-burning engine, Special order for burning No. 1 fuel oil of 38-42 Baume or octane rating 35 or higher.
Transmission: Automotive type differential carried on four Timken bearings, Forward/Reverse.
Drive: Worm and worm gear and differential operating in a bath of oil. On each side of differential housing is chain reduction to final drive axle, each operating in a bath of oil.
Speed: From 3/4 to 4 miles per hour (1.2–6.4 km/h).
Clearance: 17 inches (43 cm) through center of tractor. Front and rear wheels adjustable from 32 to 44 inches (81–112 cm) on tread centers.
Wheels/Tires: Cast Iron Split Rim with 6.00-12 Garden Tractor Lug Tires
Colors: Green and Yellow

=== Little Jeff ===
The Roths Little Jeff was introduced sometime around 1956-1957. It is unknown exactly when these were manufactured or how many of these units were sold. These riding tractors had the following available attachments: Bulldozer Blade, Disc Harrow, Cultivator, Sickle Bar, Rotary Mower, Trailing Gang Mowers, Moldboard Plow and optional: Parallel Rear Tool Lift

Type: Four wheel riding tractor
Engine: 2 sizes - 3.6 and 4 H.P., Kohler and Continental
Transmission: 1 Forward speed, 1 Reverse, Standard Automotive Type
Rear End: Worm Gear Drive with Differential, Timken bearing equipped, Operates in oil bath
Wheels/Tires(Front): 4.00-8 Pneumatic, Ball Bearing or Timken Bearing
Wheels/Tires(Rear): 6.00-12 or 6.00-16 Traction Type Tires adjustable on axles
Weight: ~ 500 pounds (230 kg)
Length: 74 inches (190 cm)
Wheel Base: 50 inches (130 cm)
Front Width: 31.5 inches (80 cm)
Front Wheel Tread Width: 27.5-inch (70 cm) at center
Rear Width: Variable 31.5 to 36 inches (80–91 cm)
Rear Wheel Tread Width: Variable 25 to 30 inches (64–76 cm) at center
Front Ground Clearance: 14 inches (36 cm)
Rear Ground Clearance: 11 inches (28 cm) under axle
Height: 40 inches (100 cm), Seat cushion 28 inches (71 cm), Center of gravity less than 20 inches (51 cm)
Color: Green and Yellow

=== Country Boy ===
The Roths Country Boy was introduced sometime around 1954-1955. It is unknown how many of these units were manufactured. These riding tractors had the following attachments available: Bulldozer Blade, Disc Harrow, Cultivator, Sickle Bar, Rotary Mower, Trailing Gang Mowers, Moldboard Plow and optional: Parallel Rear Tool Lift

Type: Four-wheel riding tractor
Engine: 3 sizes - 6.6, 8 ½, 9 H.P., Wisconsin, Clinton, or Kohler
Transmission: 3 speeds, Forward/Reverse, Standard Automotive Type
Rear End: Worm Gear Drive with Differential
Wheels/Tires(Front): 4.00-8, 4.00-12
Wheels/Tires(Rear): Standard 6.00-16 or Oversize 7.00-16
Weight: ~ 700 pounds (320 kg)
Length: 74 inches (190 cm)
Wheel Base: 50 inches (130 cm)
Front Width: 31.5 inches (80 cm)
Front Wheel Tread Width: 27.5 inches (70 cm) at center
Rear Width: Variable 31.5 to 36 inches (80–91 cm)
Rear Wheel Tread Width: Variable 25 to 30 inches (64–76 cm) at center
Front Ground Clearance: 14 inches (36 cm)
Rear Ground Clearance: 11 inches (28 cm) under axle
Height: Massive Cast Front 40 inches (100 cm), Seat cushion 28 inches (71 cm)
Color: Green and Yellow
