= Burns & Wilcox =

Insurance broker

Burns & Wilcox is an independent insurance wholesale broker and managing underwriter founded in 1969 by Herbert W. Kaufman. Its corporate headquarters is located in Farmington Hills, Michigan. Burns & Wilcox, previously a public company, is family run with Kaufman's son Alan Jay Kaufman serving as chairman, president, and CEO.

In February 2020, the company announced the expansion and renovation of its Houston office to support continued growth. Kaufman Real Estate Management, a subsidiary of Burns & Wilcox parent company H.W. Kaufman Group, will curate the new office.

== H.W. Kaufman Financial Group ==
H.W. Kaufman Financial Group is the parent company of Burns & Wilcox. It employs over 2,000 employees in the finance and insurance industries. Burns & Wilcox Brokerage, a brokerage firm based in San Francisco, CA that opened in 2010, also belongs to the H.W. Kaufman Financial Group.

== Employees ==
- In 2011, the National Association of Insurance Women named Melanie Elias, director of claims, International Claims Professional of the Year.
- Ernst & Young selected H.W. Kaufman Financial Group CEO, chairman, and president Alan Jay Kaufman as a regional winner in their Entrepreneur of the Year program for the Michigan and Northwest Ohio Business Services category in July 2011.
- Director of Professional Lines David Derigiotis teaches a "webinar" for Insurance Journal's Academy of Insurance.
- In May 2020, Linda Koos was added in the team as vice president and managing director.

== Sponsorships ==
In 2017, Burns & Wilcox signed a sponsorship agreement with Olympia Entertainment and the Detroit Red Wings. In 2018, the company announced its sponsorship of the Detroit Red Wings co-captain Justin Abdelkader. Burns & Wilcox also sponsors 2018 Players Championship at TPC Sawgrass winner Webb Simpson, 2021 Genesis Open winner Max Homa, and 2016 PGA Champion Jimmy Walker.
