= Towne Club =

Soft drink brand

- Type: Subsidiary
- Industry: Beverages
- Headquarters: Detroit, Michigan, United States
- Parent: Intrastate Distributors, Inc.
- Website: www.towneclub.com

Towne Club is a local brand of soft drink produced and sold primarily in the metropolitan area of Detroit, Michigan. It is also sold in Flint, Grand Rapids, Lansing, Kalamazoo, Saginaw, Traverse City, Tampa, Florida, Indianapolis, Indiana, Cleveland and Toledo, Ohio at one time.

== History ==
=== Early history ===
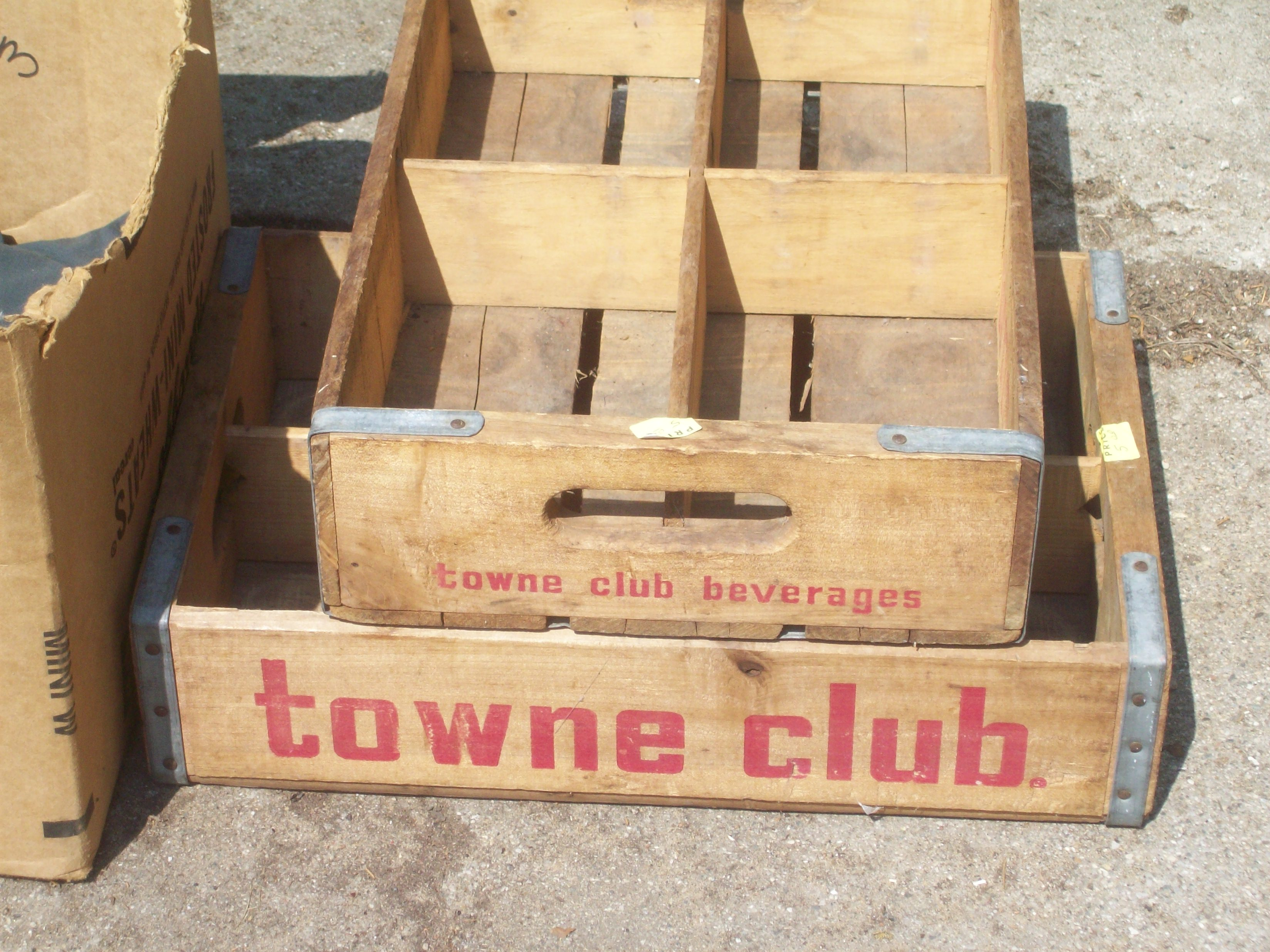
Empty Towne Club crates

Towne Club was founded and operated by Harold Samhat in the mid-1960s. The company first started selling its pop in its own retail outlets in Detroit, known as "pop centers". It was an affordable alternative to bigger brands such as Coca-Cola and Pepsi, and often sold well in Detroit's poorer neighborhoods. The pop centers offered many more flavors of soda pop than were typically seen in grocery stores, and the pop was sold by the 24-glass-bottle wooden case. People would enter the store, grab a wooden crate, and walk around the various stacks of pop around the warehouse-type store. Customers would bring back empty bottles and cases and start all over again.

The company carved out its niche by offering multiple flavors in both regular and diet varieties in an attempt to rival its more powerful regional competitor, Faygo. The attempt proved successful, as Towne Club was able to expand its reach further North in Michigan, South into Central Indiana, parts of Northwestern Ohio, Upstate New York and Florida.

Samhat sold the company in 1978 to Pop Shoppes of Toronto, Canada (controlled by Venturetech of Toronto, Canada). He remained with the company until 1982. The company began falling on hard times in the mid- to late-1980s, after the decision was made to close its retail pop centers, though Towne Club was still available. Sales continued to slide, not out of disloyalty, but buyers of the products were left wondering what outlets still sold it.

=== Comeback ===
Towne Club Bottling announced a comeback in the mid-1990s (though they had never really left) and through a very aggressive media campaign, made an effort to make fans of the soft drinks aware of where to purchase the products. Returning in 1997, Towne Club had changed little of its product or its packaging. Unlike many of its multinational competitors, Towne Club pop was still sold in 12 ounce returnable crowned glass bottles, which, in keeping with Michigan's deposit law, are worth ten cents each when returned to retailers.

The Towne Club brand is now controlled by Intrastate Distributors, Inc., known as IDI, Inc. Within a couple of years, the Towne Club brands switched to plastic re-sealable bottles and new labeling. IDI also bottles other beverages, including Orange Crush, Frostie Root Beer and Stewart's Root Beer. The bottles required a standard bottle opener to be used in order to consume the product. In 2014, Detroit Style Pizza Co. began to serve Towne Club in its restaurants.

== Flavors ==
Towne Club has a variety of regular soda, diet soda and seltzers in their current lineup.

=== Regular ===
- Cola
- Ginger Ale
- Grape
- Honolulu Blue Cream (Detroit Lions color)
- Lemonade
- Mango Orange
- Green Apple
- Michigan Berries
- Michigan Cherry
- Orange
- Pineapple Passion Fruit
- Root Beer
- Sparkling Blue Lemonade
- Strawberry
- Strawberry Lemonade
- Strawberry Melon
- Tropical Punch
- Vanilla Cream

=== Diet ===
- Black Cherry
- Cream
- Orange
- Root Beer

=== Seltzers ===
- Black Cherry
- Classic
