= Borroughs =

Office equipment manufacturer

The Borroughs Corporation is an American manufacturer of shelving and office fixtures. The corporate headquarters is in Kalamazoo, Michigan.

Borroughs was established in 1938 under the name Probar Company. The company began as a contract fabricator, producing saw cabinets. It soon branched out and began producing fluorescent strip lighting fixtures as well as continuing contract work for automotive accessory firms. In 1939, the founder, Walter L. Borroughs, changed the name to Borroughs Manufacturing Company.

During World War II, Borroughs was subcontracted to manufacture various military components, such as land tank components, gun turret components, air scoops for aircraft, and water baffles for amphibious landing craft.

After the war, the company manufactured automotive bins. American Metal Products Company purchased the company in 1950, following Mr. Borroughs' death in 1948. Under the new management, Borroughs began to produce office furniture, industrial shelving, and storage units.

When American Metal Products merged with Lear Siegler, Inc. in 1966, Borroughs became a separate division of the new corporation.

In 1987, Forstmann Little purchased Lear Siegler; in 1991, some of Borroughs' managers and partial owners in Kalamazoo purchased the company from Forstmann Little. In the 1990s, the company's products included checkstands and other retail fixtures. The Borroughs Series 90 conveyor belt system became widely used after many Pathmark supermarkets began installing them. At one time, Borroughs checkstands were in use at many Wal-Mart stores as well.
