= Pro-Vision =

Manufacturer

Pro-Vision Video Systems
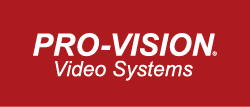
- Company type: Private
- Founded: 2003
- Headquarters: Byron Center, MI, United States
- Area served: Worldwide
- Products: Body cameras; Dashcams; Backup cameras
- Website: provisionusa.com

Pro-Vision is an American manufacturer of specialty cameras headquartered in Byron Center, Michigan. The company manufactures and sells a variety of cameras including dashcams, body cameras, and backup cameras. The company has appeared on the Inc. 5000 list of the fastest growing American companies from 2011 to 2017. As of December 2016, Pro-Vision products have been used by organizations in over 50 countries.

== History ==
Pro-Vision was founded in 2003. The company initially manufactured items like backup cameras for commercial vehicles and later expanded into video recording on school buses and police cruisers.

In 2012, Pro-Vision began manufacturing body cameras for police officers. Pro-Vision trademarked the term "BodyCam" and applied it to their body-worn cameras. In 2014, the company began fielding more orders for police body cameras in the wake of the Ferguson unrest and President Barack Obama's call for increased accountability and clarity during volatile police situations. Numerous police departments throughout the United States and other countries have begun using Pro-Vision body cameras.

In 2017, Pro-Vision made the Inc. 5000 list for the seventh consecutive year (2011-2017) as one of the fastest-growing private companies in America. Pro-Vision is one of only seven manufacturers to make the list for seven consecutive years Inc. President and Editor-In-Chief Eric Schurenberg said, "You have to remember that the average company on the Inc. 5000 grew nearly six-fold since 2012." Pro-Vision was also ranked as the fastest-growing video system manufacturer.

In 2019, JMC Capital Partners, a Boston-based private equity firm, acquired Pro-Vision.

In June 2020, Pro-Vision announced leadership changes, as it appointed Michael Finn as president and Kevin Spalding as CFO.

In September 2020, Pro-Vision announced it acquired St. Petersburg, Florida-based Zone Defense, a manufacturer of advanced video systems for automotive and fleet industries. With a location in Canada, the acquisition of Zone Defense offered Pro-Vision a physical footprint outside of the United States.

In November 2020, Pro-Vision partnered with Kajeet, an IoT connectivity, software, and hardware company, to provide video recording cameras for school buses.

Additionally, Kajeet's IoT management platform Sentinel offers Wi-Fi access on a connected school bus for up to 65 students.

== Recognition ==
In 2021, the Grand Rapids Business Journal announced it named Pro-Vision as the winner of its 2020 Newsmaker of the Year award in the technology category. The business journal stated that 2020 marked "various innovations in video systems technology" for Pro-Vision, including the release of the 900 Series Hybrid HD DVR and the BODYCAM® 4 body-worn camera.

== Products ==
Pro-Vision initially began as a manufacturer of cameras and recording systems that could be used in vehicles. Dashcams and backup cameras could be installed in commercial vehicles, school buses, and police cars to prevent accidents and limit liability. These devices continue to be manufactured by Pro-Vision. In recent years, their trademarked "Bodycam" has become one of their notable products. These devices can be clipped onto an officer's uniform (generally in the shoulder or chest area) where it can capture and record video of any incident with the public.

== See also ==
- IndigoVision
