= Glen's Markets =

Defunct American supermarket chain

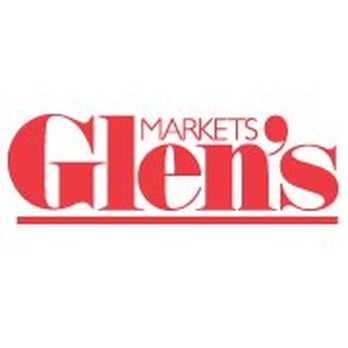

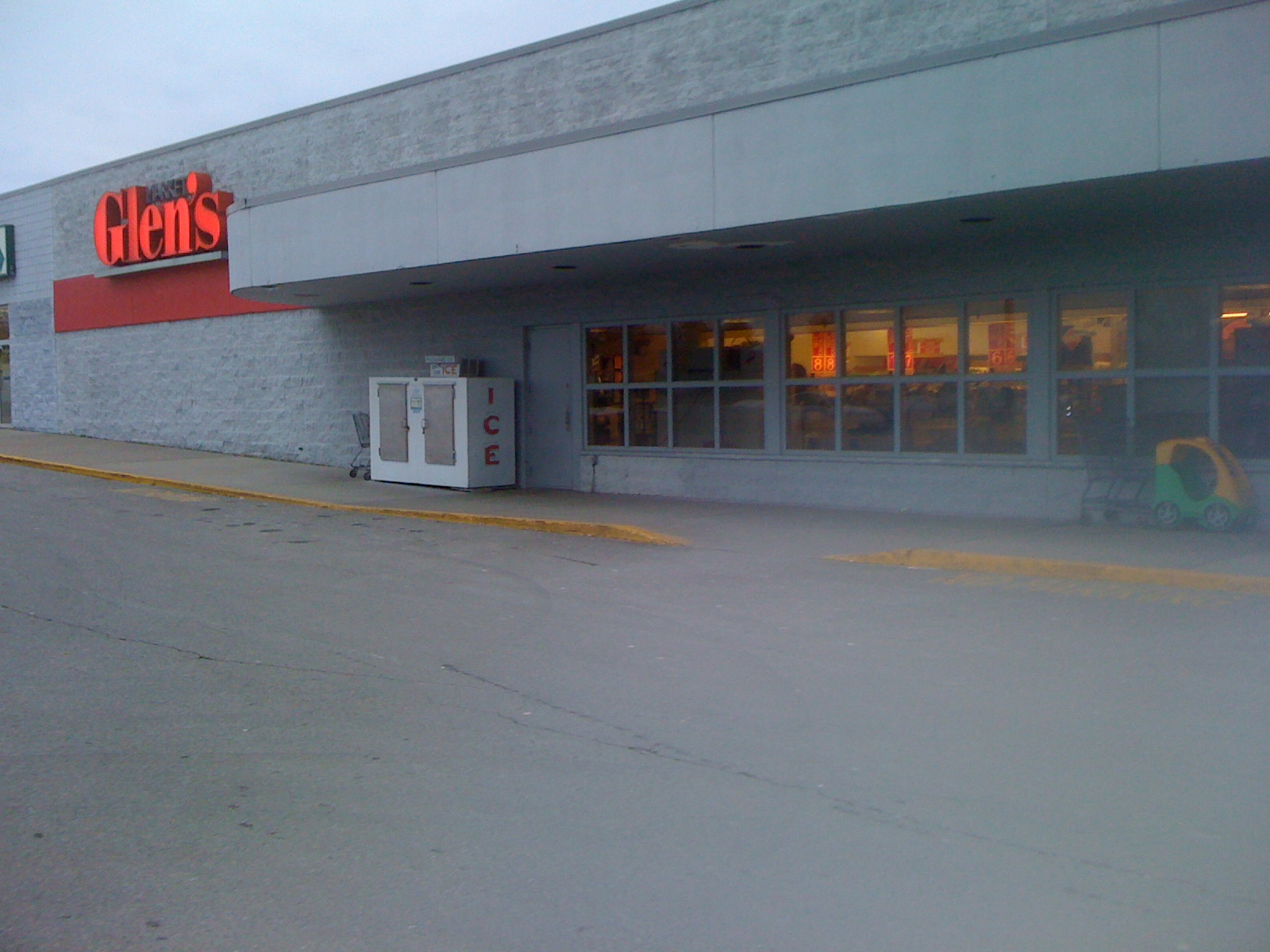
- Glen's Markets in Oscoda, Michigan, before conversion to Family Fare.
- Company type: Subsidiary
- Industry: Grocery
- Founded: 1951; 75 years ago, in Gaylord, Michigan
- Founder: C. Glen Catt
- Fate: Converted to Family Fare
- Area served: Michigan
- Products: Grocery items
- Parent: SpartanNash

Glen's Markets was an American supermarket chain. Founded in Gaylord, Michigan in 1951 by C. Glen Catt, the chain had more than 30 locations across Northern Michigan and the Upper Peninsula. Expansions in the 1980s onward came through location acquisitions of other chains, including Ashcraft's and Prevo's. For most of its history, Glen's Markets were an affiliate of Spartan Stores (now SpartanNash), which bought the chain outright in 1999. Starting in 2010, Spartan began converting Glen's stores to the Family Fare name, with the last ones being converted in 2014.

== History ==
The first Glen's Market was opened in 1951 in Gaylord, Michigan by C. Glen Catt, in a store originally known as Vincent's. The store was expanded later in the 1950s, just as Glen's became affiliated Spartan Foods (now SpartanNash). Stores in Kalkaska and Grayling opened in 1956 and 1959. Throughout the 1970s, the original three stores were relocated to new buildings, while many more were added throughout northeastern Michigan. The locations in Rose City and Mio were both converted from IGA, while Mancelona and Roscommon were both converted from A&P. By 1981, Glen's operated 11 stores, with a 12th under construction at the time in Rogers City.

The chain expanded into the Upper Peninsula of Michigan in 1986 by purchasing Red Owl locations in St. Ignace, Munising, Sault Ste. Marie, and Iron Mountain, along with a newly built store in Escanaba. The latter two were sold only two years later, while both Munising and Sault Ste. Marie were relocated in the early 1990s. In 1992, Glen's acquired former Giant locations in Petoskey, East Tawas, and Alpena, followed by a second Petoskey location in a former Buy Low Foods a year later. The East Tawas store, along with an existing store in Alpena that opened in 1988, were both closed and converted to Save-A-Lot in 1997. The same year, the Gaylord store was thoroughly remodeled, adding a Dairy Queen franchise. After C. Glen Catt retired, he sold the business to his son, Glen A. Catt.

Spartan Stores, now known as SpartanNash, bought Glen's in 1999, having been a supplier of products for the chain for decades prior. At the time of the sale, the chain was owned by Glen Catt's grandson, also named Glen Catt, and it comprised 23 stores, 4 pharmacies, and a warehouse in Waters, Michigan. Not included in the sale were several other properties still owned by the company at the time, including the Save-A-Lot franchises, and the shopping center adjacent to the Gaylord store. Under Spartan's ownership, the Glen's name was expanded in 2004 when Spartan consolidated most locations of Traverse City-based Prevo's and all locations of Harrison-based Ashcraft's into Glen's. In 2012, the Glen's stores in Clare and Marion, both former Ashcraft's, were converted to a new discount brand called Valu Land.

At this point, Spartan also began rebranding Glen's stores to Family Fare. The first to change over was the Midland store, also a former Ashcraft's, in 2010. Throughout 2013 and 2014, Glen's locations increasingly converted to Family Fare, ending with Frankfort and Sault Ste. Marie. The only exceptions were the two locations in Petoskey, where one rebranded by Spartan as D&W Fresh Market, while the other location was closed, before being bought by Hobby Lobby in 2014.
