= Seaway Food Town =

Defunct supermarket chain operator

- Company type: Public
- Founded: 1948
- Defunct: 2003
- Headquarters: United States
- Number of locations: 73
- Number of employees: 4,551
- Parent: Spartan Stores 2000-2003

Seaway Food Town, Inc. was a company that operated the Food Town chain of supermarkets and The Pharm chain of discount drug stores in Northwest Ohio and Southeast Michigan. Based in Maumee, Ohio, it was founded in 1948 as a buying and advertising cooperative, incorporated as Seaway Food Town in 1957, and became a publicly traded company in the early 1960s. The company was acquired by Spartan Stores in August 2000.

At the time of the merger with Spartan, the company operated 47 Food Town supermarkets and 26 The Pharm deep-discount drugstores.

In 2003 Spartan Stores sold or closed all 39 of the Food Town stores.

== See also ==
- Rich Iott - CEO of the family firm at the time of its merger
