= The Planterra Conservatory =

Coordinates: 42.3150°N 84.2355°W

- Location of The Planterra Conservatory

General information
- Architectural style: Conservatory (greenhouse)
- Location: 7315 Drake Road, West Bloomfield Township, Michigan, United States
- Groundbreaking: October 16, 2008
- Completed: 2010
- Opened: 2010
- Cost: More than $3 million
- Owner: Planterra Corporation

Technical details
- Material: Glass and iron
- Size: 23,000 sq ft (2,100 m^{2})

Design and construction
- Architect: Neumann/Smith Architects

Website
- www.planterraevents.com

The Planterra Conservatory is a complex of greenhouses in West Bloomfield, Michigan.

== History ==
The Planterra Corporation was established as an interior landscape firm founded in 1973 by Larry M. Pliska. It is also a distributor of live and replica plants in the United States. It is co-owned by the founder, his wife CEO Carol Pliska, and their son Shane Pliska. The company opened the Planterra Conservatory as an extension of their original business in 2010. Construction began in October 2008.

The Conservatory was established in West Bloomfield, intended to combine plant shopping with the experience of simply visiting an indoor garden. The conservatory complex consists of 23,000-square-feet. The space is enclosed in three adjoining glass greenhouses with European hipped rooflines. Its roof controls heating vents and cooling curtains to provide energy efficiency to the complex. In September 2011 the Conservatory and design firm was awarded three National Awards of Excellence by the Plantscape Industry Alliance for the renovation of Palmhouse at Rideau Hall in Ottawa, Ontario, Canada, the Meditation Garden at St. Joseph’s Mercy Hospital in Ypsilanti, Michigan, and the Living Wall and Bar at Planterra Conservatory. Planterra has also been awarded the prestigious Diamond Award at the International Plantscape Awards twice, most recently in July 2019 for their work on the Parkview Cancer Institute in Fort Wayne, Indiana.

== Installations and events ==
The structure was not built in order to host events, however it has become a very popular wedding venue for couples across the country even hosting the wedding of Olympians Tanith Belbin and Charlie White. In March 2011 the Conservatory hosted the inaugural Botanical Glass Salon and Exhibition. The Detroit Symphony Orchestra also hosts concerts in the building each year.
