= Travel Adventures =

- Company type: Private
- Industry: Travel Industry
- Founded: 1987
- Founder: Michael Palmer, David Snyder
- Headquarters: Lapeer, Michigan, USA
- Key people: David Snyder (President), John Krish (General Manager)
- Services: Student Group Travel, Festival and Tour operator
- Number of employees: 32
- Website: www.traveladventures.com

Travel Adventures began in 1987 by founders Michael Palmer and David Snyder. The company is a member of the Student and Youth Travel Association (SYTA) - a non-profit, professional trade association, which was formed in 1997. In September 2008, John Krish (General Manager) of Travel Adventures became President of SYTA.

The combined total revenues for Travel Adventures was reportedly $8.2 million in 2007.

== Travel Adventures ==
Travel Adventures creates custom educational travel experiences serving teachers and students nationwide. In 2007 a nationwide study conducted by Michigan State University within the Student and Youth Travel Research Institute (SYTRI) found that Performing Arts is rising in popularity. Travel Adventures is a provider of student tours including The National Performing Arts Festival.
