= Schmohz =

Michigan-based brewery and taproom

Schmohz Brewing Company
- "Good Beer for Good People"
- Interactive map of Schmohz Brewing Company
- Location: Grand Rapids, Michigan
- Coordinates: 42.91605°N 85.54855°W
- Opened: 2004
- Owner: Jim & Laurie Schwerin
- Website: www.schmohz.com

Active beers
Name	Type
Hopknocker	Imperial India Pale Ale
I.P.A.	India Pale Ale
Treasure Chest	Extra Special Bitter
Pail Ale	Pale Ale
Bonecrusher	Stout
Valley City	Cream ale
Amber Tease	California common
Schmohz Root Beer	Rootbeer soft drink

Seasonal beers
Name	Type
Mad Tom's	Porter
Kiss My Scottish Arse	Scotch Ale
John T. Pilsner	Pilsner
Pickle Tink	Strawberry Wheat
Miracle Off 28th Street	Old ale
Gypsy Kiss	Bock
Cirrus Weizen	Weizen
Oktoberfest	Dark Wheat Ale
Shameless O'Pikey	Irish Red Ale
Jack of Spades	Black India Pale Ale
Gingerbread Brown	Christmas beer
Anniversary Barley Wine	Barley Wine
Coconut Crusher	Toasted Coconut Stout
Zingiberene Ale	Ginger Gruit

Inactive beers
Name	Type
Razzmanian Devil	Raspberry Wheat
Schwartz	Schwarzbier

Schmohz Brewing Company is a brewery and taproom located in Grand Rapids, Michigan. Jim Schwerin (owner/brewer) and Gabi Palmer (head brewer until August 2021) are responsible for brewing the beer. Both are alumni of Michigan Technological University (MTU). Schmohz holds a Michigan microbrewery license.

Schmohz products are also available in stores, bars, and restaurants around Michigan. The Taproom (located at 2600 Patterson Ave. SE, Grand Rapids, MI 49546) features 16 taps, including 8 standard beers, 7 seasonal and rotating beers, and a rootbeer soda (great for floats). The Treasure Chest ESB won a gold medal at the 2017 U.S. Open Beer Championship.

In 2009 Schmohz added a biergarten so patrons can drink their beer outside. Picnic tables and an honor grill populate the biergarten. Schmohz does not serve food but is outside-food friendly. You can even have food delivered there.

In 2018 Schmohz opened a second taproom inside Mancino's Pizza in Petoskey, Michigan. The Petoskey location has 11 taps which includes a rootbeer soda plus 10 rotating beers.

Schmohz also hosts the West Michigan Chapter of the Michigan Tech Alumni Association monthly meetings and is an integral part of event staff for the Chapter.
