= First Merchants Corporation =

Financial holding company in Indiana, United States

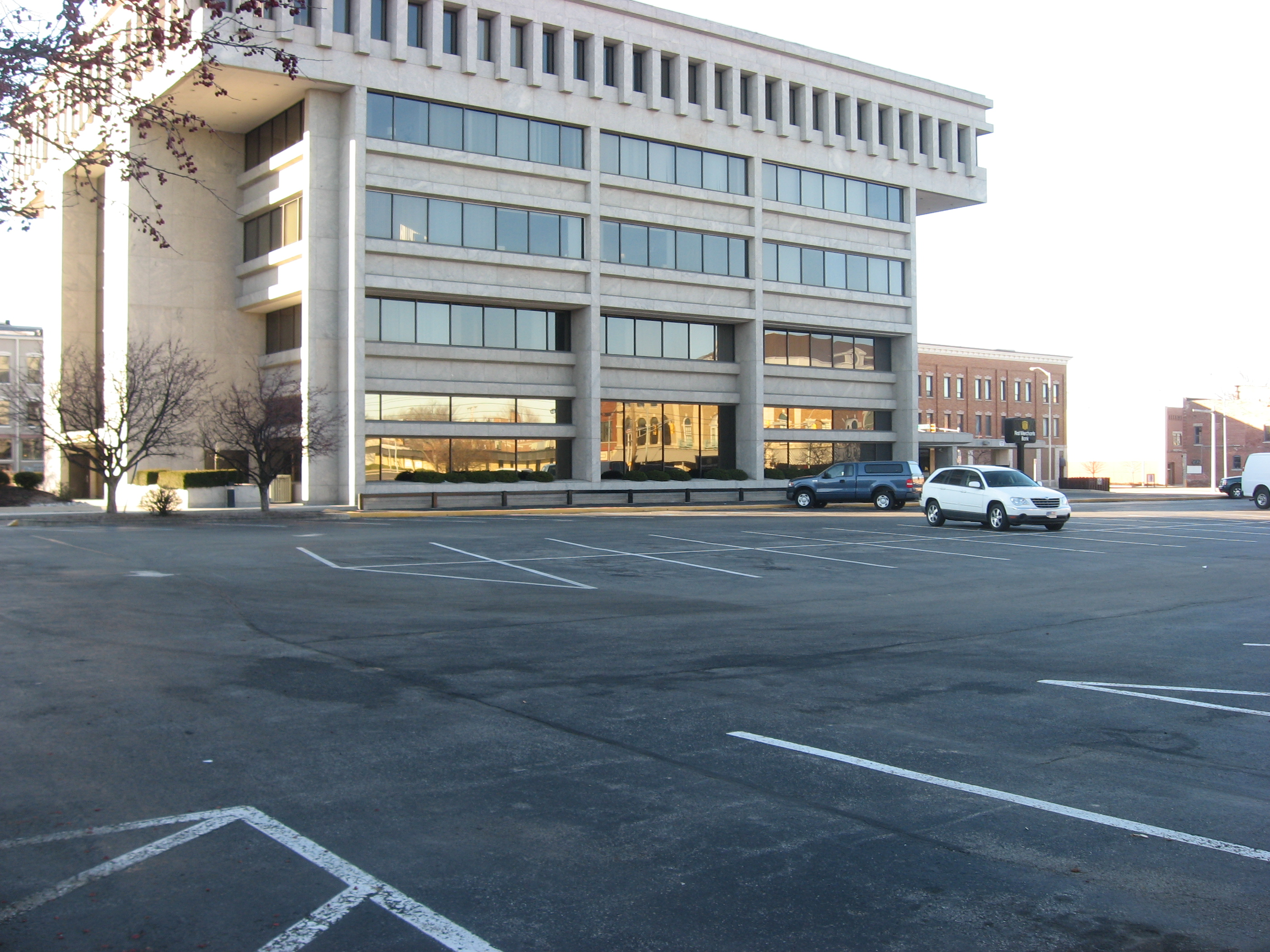
- Corporate office in Muncie, Indiana
- Trade name: First Merchants
- Type: Public
- Traded as: Nasdaq: FRME; Russell 2000 Component
- Founded: 1892; 134 years ago
- Headquarters: Muncie, Indiana, United States
- Key people: Mark Hardwick (CEO)
- Products: Banking, Trust
- Total assets: ▲$21.2 billion USD (2026)
- Number of employees: 2,224 (2023)
- Website: firstmerchants.com

First Merchants Corporation is a financial holding company in Central Indiana, headquartered in Muncie, Indiana. The Corporation includes First Merchants Bank and First Merchants Private Wealth Advisors (a division of First Merchants Bank). The company is listed on the NASDAQ as FRME. As of March 2026, total asset size of First Merchants Corporation was $21.1 billion. First Merchants offers commercial banking, personal banking, and investment advisor services.

== History ==
First Merchants Bank has been growing both organically and through mergers and acquisitions. Banks acquired include:

- 1893 – Merchants National Bank, Muncie, IN
- 1988 – Pendleton Banking Company, Pendleton, IN
- 1991 – First United Bank, Middletown, IN
- 1996 – Union County National Bank, Liberty, IN
- 1996 – The Randolph County Bank, Winchester, IN
- 1999 – First National Bank of Portland, Portland, IN
- 1999 – Anderson Community Bank, Anderson, IN
- 2000 – Decatur Bank & Trust, Decatur, IN
- 2001 – Frances Slocum Bank & Trust, Wabash, IN
- 2002 – Lafayette Bank & Trust, Lafayette, IN
- 2003 – Commerce National Bank, Columbus, OH
- 2008 – Lincoln Bank, Plainfield, IN
- 2012 – Shelby County Bank, Shelbyville, IN
- 2013 – Citizens Financial Bank, Munster, IN
- 2014 – Community Bank, Noblesville, IN
- 2015 – Cooper State Bank, Columbus, OH
- 2015 – Ameriana Bank, New Castle, IN
- 2017 – Arlington Bank, Columbus, OH
- 2017 – iAB Bank, Fort Wayne, IN
- 2019 – Monroe Bank and Trust, Monroe, MI
- 2020 – Hoosier Trust Company, Indianapolis, IN
- 2022 – Level One Bank, Farmington Hills, MI
- 2026 – First Savings Bank, Jeffersonville, IN

A baseball/softball complex on the campus of Ball State University was renamed the First Merchants Ballpark Complex in 2016.

== Recognition ==
In June 2022, First Merchants Bank was ranked by Forbes as one of America's Best Banks. This is the 5th year in a row First Merchants has received this award. In March 2021, Forbes ranked First Merchants Bank as a top U.S. bank for the 4th consecutive year. First Merchants Bank was ranked #2 on the “America's Best Bank list in January 2019. compiled by Forbes, up from their #4 ranking in 2018.

In May, 2022, First Merchants Bank was voted 4th in "Great Employers to Work for in Indiana" by the Best Companies Group. Additionally, First Merchants Bank was listed as one of the “Best Places to Work in Indiana” by the Indiana Chamber of Commerce in 2018 for Major Companies with 1,000+ employees and again in 2019. First Merchants Bank was named as one of the “Best Places to Work” by Columbus Business First for 2018 and as one of the 2019 Best Employers in Ohio, a list created by the Ohio SHRM State Council, Crain's Cleveland Business and Best Companies Group. First Merchants was also named one of the “Best Places to Work” in the state of Illinois in 2018 and again in 2019. Comparably gives First Merchants Bank an A+ on Culture Score with a 4.7 out of 5 star rating based on 133+ employee survey responses as of June 2022.

First Merchants Bank was rated as one of the best "In-State Banks" by Forbes and Statistica in June 2022. First Merchants was also rated as one of the top big banks in the US by Newsweek magazine in 2022 and one of the top 20 banks in the US by S&P Global Market Intelligence in 2022.
