= Gemini Group =

American company

Gemini Group Inc.
- Type: Private
- Industry: Plastic & Metal Products
- Founded: 1972
- Headquarters: Bad Axe, Michigan, United States 43.78777°N 82.99525°W
- Number of locations: 18
- Area served: Global
- Key people: Anthony Trecapelli, CEO
- Products: Aluminum extrusion dies; Automotive interior trim; Blow-molded plastic components; Die-cast tooling; Extruded plastic profiles; Forge tooling; Two-shot injection-molded components
- Services: Design and engineering; Die repair and maintenance; Plastic extrusion and co-extrusion; Technical blow molding; Tooling engineering and manufacturing; Two-shot injection molding
- Number of employees: 1,400
- Divisions: Engineered Plastic Products; Engineered Metal Tooling Solutions
- Website: https://geminigroup.net

Gemini Group, Inc. is a supplier of engineered plastic products and metal tooling solutions to OEM's and Tier 1 and 2 suppliers. The company operates internationally from its headquarters in Bad Axe, Michigan in the United States.

== History ==
Gemini Group traces its origins to 1972, when Bill Roberts and Frank Peplinski established Lyntex Manufacturing, a sewing operation that initially produced helmet liners and later expanded into automotive seatbelts. That same year, Jack Rochefort purchased Thumb Tool & Engineering, an aluminum extrusion tool-and-die business in Michigan's Thumb region.

In 1977, Roberts and Peplinski established Gemini Plastics, adding blow molding and plastic extrusion capabilities for the automotive industry. The companies expanded their manufacturing operations through a series of partnerships and new businesses. In 1979, they formed an alliance with CKS Tool & Engineering and Briney Tooling Systems, followed by a partnership with Axly Tool & Bushing in 1980, adding precision and production computer numerical control (CNC) machining capabilities. A 1983 partnership with Thumb Plastics added two-shot injection molding capabilities.

Expansion continued in 1984 with the formation of Regency Plastics in Ubly, Michigan, for blow molding and Regency Plastics-El Paso, later renamed Sierra Plastics, in El Paso, Texas. Valley Enterprises was established in Ubly in 1990, adding automotive interior trim manufacturing.

In 1996, the affiliated plastic products and metal tooling businesses were brought together under Gemini Group.

Gemini Group continued to expand through acquisitions and the development of additional operations. CKS Tool & Engineering and Axly Tool & Bushing were combined in 2009 to form Gemini Precision Machining, which later became the company's forge tooling operation. Gemini Plastics de Mexico was established in Saltillo, Mexico, in 2011.

In 2013, Gemini Group acquired Mid-South Extrusion Die and Consolidated Tool in Muscle Shoals, Alabama, expanding its aluminum extrusion tooling operations. The company acquired Tri-R Dies in Youngstown, Ohio, in 2021 and GT Plastics in Oscoda, Michigan, in 2022, expanding its plastic extrusion operations into the building and construction market.

Gemini Group is headquartered in Bad Axe, Michigan, and is one of the largest employers in Huron County, Michigan, where it operates four plastic product plants and two metal tooling solutions plants. In total, it operates 17 manufacturing facilities in the United States and Mexico. Its operations include automotive interior trim, plastic extrusion and co-extrusion, two-shot injection molding, technical blow molding, aluminum extrusion tooling, forge tooling, and aluminum die-cast tooling.

== Operations ==
The company is structured as follows:

=== Plastics divisions ===
- Valley Enterprises - Automotive Interior Trim
- Regency Plastics - Technical Blow Molding
- Gemini Plastics, Inc. (GPI) - Plastic Extrusion & Coextrusion
- GT Plastics - Plastic Extrusion & Coextrusion
- Sierra Plastics - Plastic Extrusion & Coextrusion
- Gemini Plastics de Mexico (GPM) - Plastic Extrusion & Coextrusion
- Thumb Plastics, Inc. (TPI) - Two-Shot & Multi-shot Injection Molding

=== Metals divisions ===
- Thumb Tool & Engineering (TTE) - Aluminum Extrusion Tooling
- Mid-South Central Extrusion Die (MSCED) - Aluminum Extrusion Tooling
- Tri-R Dies (TRD) - Aluminum Extrusion Tooling
- Consolidated Tool (CT) - Aluminum Die Cast and Aluminum Extrusion Tooling
- Gemini Precision Machining, Inc. (GPMI) - Forge Tooling
- Briney Tooling Systems - Precision Toolholders

== Awards and Recognition ==
In 1995, Thumb Tool & Engineering, a Gemini Group company, received a Gold Award from the Michigan Occupational Safety and Health Administration (MIOSHA) through its Consultation Education and Training awards program.

In 2006, Gemini Group received a Silver Supplier Performance Award from Johnson Controls.The company's Supplier Performance Awards recognized suppliers based on performance in quality, cost, logistics, development, technology and service.

In 2007, Gemini Group received a Gold Supplier Performance Award from Johnson Controls.

In 2008, Gemini Group received a second consecutive Gold Supplier Performance Award from Johnson Controls.

In 2009, Gemini Group received a Bronze Supplier Performance Award from Johnson Controls.

In 2017, Regency Plastics, a Gemini Group company, won both the Industrial Division and the Industrial/Auto Transportation category of the Society of Plastics Engineers (SPE) Blow Molded Parts Competition for an under-floor insulated HVAC duct.

In 2018, Gemini Group was named Community Partner of the Year by Thumb Industries.

In 2026, Regency Plastics, a Gemini Group company, received a Challenging Spirit Award from Honda. The award recognizes suppliers that take on difficult challenges and perform beyond expectations.
