= Sorensen Gross Construction Company =

American construction company

- Founded: 1925
- Headquarters: Flint, Michigan
- Key people: Ghassan Saab, Chief Executive Officer and Richard Sly, President
- Website: Sorensen Gross

Sorensen Gross Construction Company (SGCS) is an American construction company, operating out of Flint, Michigan. Sorensen Gross has other offices in Ann Arbor, Michigan, Milwaukee, Wisconsin, Roseville, Minnesota, Schaumburg, Illinois, St. Louis, Missouri, Vienna, Virginia, Tampa, Florida, and Charlotte, North Carolina.

== History ==
Sorensen Gross Construction Company was founded in 1925 in Grand Rapids, Michigan by John Sorensen and Robert Gross. The company moved to Flint, Michigan in 1927, where it is still presently operating. In 1966, the company was taken over by Ghassan Saab. In 1972, Richard Sly joined Ghassan Saab in the executive offices.

In 1999, Sorensen Gross was ranked in The Michigan Private 100, placing as the 34th the fastest-growing private business in the state of Michigan. In 2005, Sorensen Gross' safety records were recognized for having more than 50,000 hours with a zero-incident rate.

Sorensen Gross partnered up with Uptown Developments, a developer group that owns several buildings in downtown Flint, and work together to renovate much of Downtown Flint. In addition Sorensen Gross began built many schools, restaurants, strip malls, and other commercial buildings.

In July 2018 the company agreed to pay a $2.481 million settlement over allegations it submitted false claims for payment under a construction contract funded by the United States Agency for International Development (USAID).

== Notable Projects ==
Sorensen Gross has completed projects in the Southeastern and Midwestern United States, Egypt, and Jordan.
