= SpartanNash =

American food distributor and grocery store chain operator

SpartanNash Company

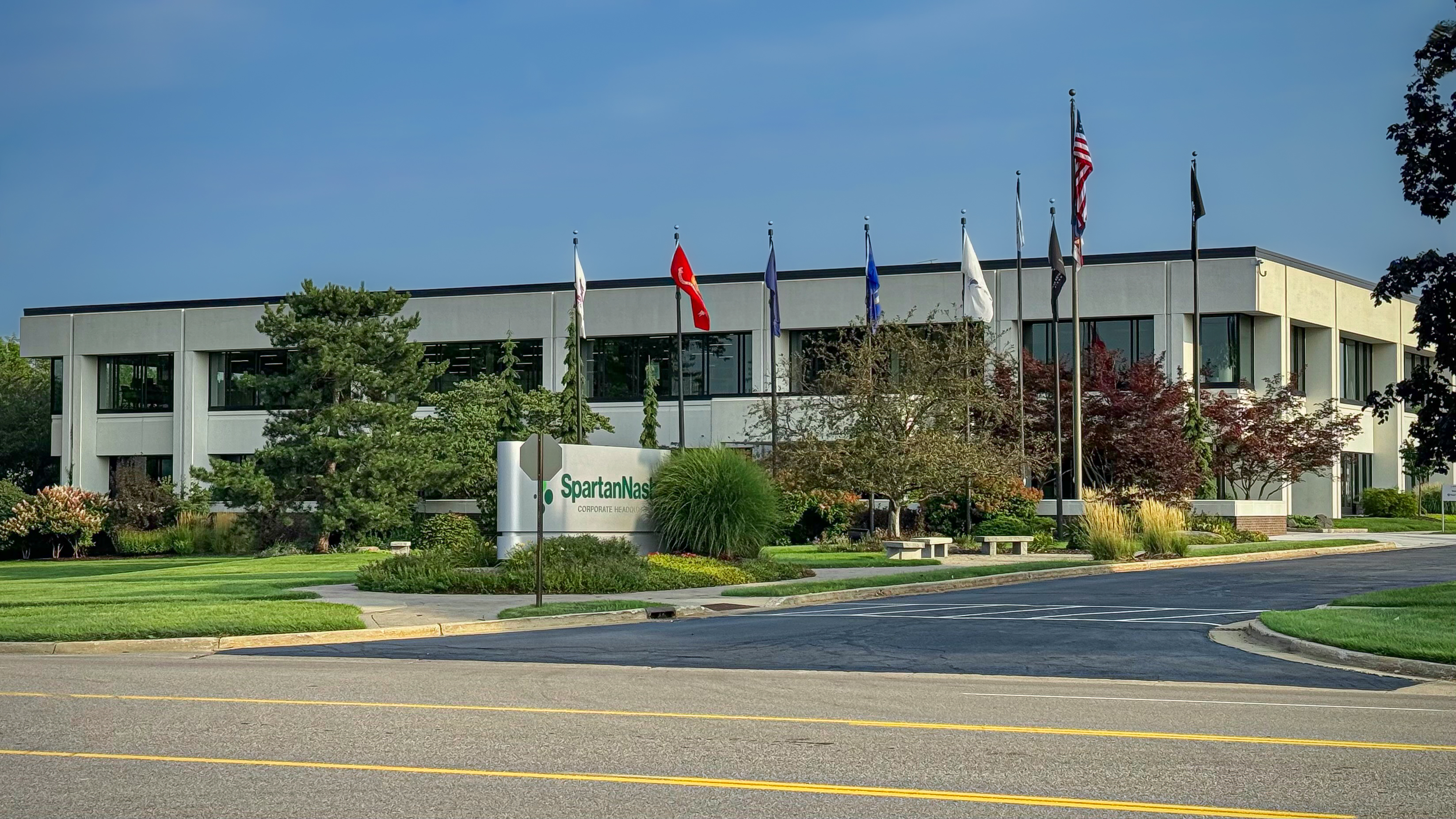
- Headquarters of SpartanNash
- Formerly: Grand Rapids Wholesale Grocery Company (1917–1957); Spartan Stores, Inc. (1957–2013)
- Type: Subsidiary
- Traded as: Nasdaq: SPTN
- Industry: Retailer; Distribution
- Predecessors: Nash Finch Company
- Founded: 1917; 109 years ago (as Spartan Stores); 19 November 2013; 12 years ago (as SpartanNash)
- Headquarters: Byron Center, Michigan
- Key people: Tony B. Sarsam (president and CEO)
- Products: Private label grocery brands
- Revenue: ▲$9.348 billion USD (2021)
- Number of employees: 20,000 (2025)
- Parent: C&S Wholesale Grocers
- Website: spartannash.com

SpartanNash Company (formerly Grand Rapids Wholesale Grocery Company and Spartan Stores, Inc.) is an American food distribution and retail company headquartered in Byron Center, Michigan. Founded in 1917, it was formerly known as Spartan Stores until adopting its current name in November 2013, following a merger with Nash Finch Company.

In September 2025, the company was purchased by C&S Wholesale Grocers.

== Overview ==
The company's core businesses include distributing food to independent grocers, military commissaries (through MDV SpartanNash, its military division acquired through its merger with Nash Finch), and corporate-owned retail grocery stores in 44 states, Europe, Latin America, and the Middle East.

SpartanNash operates 147 corporate-owned retail stores under a number of brands located in the Midwestern United States, primarily under the banners of Family Fare, Martin's Super Markets, and D&W Fresh Market, many of which are local and regional grocery chains acquired by SpartanNash.

In terms of revenue, it is the largest food distributor serving military commissaries and exchanges in the United States. The company is known for its "Our Family" line of products and formerly the "Spartan" line of products.

In 2025, SpartanNash announced that it was beginning proceedings to be acquired by C&S Wholesale Grocers, the holding company that controls Piggly Wiggly. On September 22, it was announced that this transaction had been completed.

== History ==
The Grand Rapids Wholesale Grocery Company was founded in 1917 by a group of 43 grocers and assumed the Spartan Stores name in 1957. For most of its history, Spartan was a cooperative. Spartan became a for-profit company in the 1970s.

D&W Food Centers, which Spartan would later acquire, began using Spartan as a supplier in 1961. As part of this agreement, D&W stores sold Spartan-branded products as well as private label products specifically developed for D&W. In 2000, D&W switched to Supervalu.

In August 2000, following an initial public offering, Spartan Stores became publicly traded on the NASDAQ under the ticker symbol SPTN.

In 2000, Spartan Stores acquired the Maumee, Ohio-based family-owned company Seaway Food Town, whose operations included 47 Food Town supermarkets and 26 The Pharm deep-discount drugstores. By 2003, the company had discontinued Food Town operations; all stores under the Food Town name were either sold or closed.

In 2005, Spartan considered an acquisition of Farmer Jack, a supermarket chain primarily operating in Michigan and parts of Ohio and Indiana, but decided not to proceed with the purchase. The company agreed to acquire D&W Food Centers, Inc. in March 2006.

In 2007, Spartan acquired the Felpausch chain consisting of 20 stores, nine with in-house pharmacies, three convenience stores, and two fuel centers. In February 2011, the last remaining Felpausch in Coldwater, Michigan switched over to the Family Fare name.

In April 2008, Spartan announced that the store and customer lists of 12 of the 14 remaining Pharm stores would be sold to Rite Aid. The remaining two Michigan stores were sold in separate transactions. Industry experts said Rite Aid would likely keep the stores open and convert them to its own format and brand. In October 2008, Spartan announced it would purchase the Fenton, Michigan-based VG's Food and Pharmacy chain after nearly 60 years as a family-owned company since its founding in 1949.

13 Glen's Markets in Northern Michigan began undergoing conversion to the Family Fare name starting in May 2013. Three new Valu Land stores were also opened in 2013.

=== SpartanNash ===
On July 22, 2013, Spartan Stores announced that it would merge with Edina, Minnesota-based Nash Finch Company. The merger was an all-stock transaction valued at $1.3 billion. Nash Finch shareholders received 1.2 shares of Spartan Stores common stock for each share of Nash Finch common stock they owned. The merger was completed on November 19, 2013, resulting in the formation of SpartanNash Company.

SpartanNash signed a contract with Amazon in May 2016 to supply grocery products to Amazon's distribution centers in support of Amazon's Prime Now's same-day deliveries that would deliver perishables to customers' doors.

On January 9, 2017, SpartanNash completed its acquisition of Caito Foods and Blue Ribbon Transport (BRT).

In March 2017, it was announced that David Staples would replace Dennis Edison as chief executive officer of SpartanNash. Edison continued as the chairman of the company's board of directors after he retired as CEO in late May.

In 2018, SpartanNash announced to their Fergus Falls Sun Mart employees on June 15, that the location would be aiming for a July 14 closure. The same year, the "Spartan" brand for private label products was dropped and replaced by the "Our Family" brand.

On December 31, 2018, SpartanNash completed its acquisition of South Bend, Indiana-based Martin's Super Markets. SpartanNash stated that it wouldn't change the chain's name or close any of the chain's stores. At the time of the acquisition, Martin's had 21 stores.

In January 2019, SpartanNash filed a lawsuit against Wisconsin-based Gordy's Markets Inc. for $46.2 million in unpaid loans. SpartanNash acquired five stores from Gordy's Markets in March 2019 and quickly resells three of the stores to Wisconsin-based KJ's Fresh Market in May 2019. The remaining two Gordy's stores were renamed Family Fare.

David Staples resigned as president and CEO in August 2019 in the wake of the company's disappointing financial performance and chairman Dennis Eidson became interim president and CEO. On September 14, 2020, Tony B. Sarsam became the president, CEO, and director of SpartanNash. Sarsam previously was CEO of Borden Dairy and Ready Pac Foods.

In October 2020, SpartanNash issued warrants to Amazon to allow the e-commerce giant to purchase up to 5.4 million shares of the company over the next seven years. If Amazon decides to exercise the warrant, Amazon could potentially own 14% of SpartanNash.

In April 2024, SpartanNash announced the impending acquisition of the three-store Metcalfe's Market grocery chain based in Madison, Wisconsin.

In October 2024, SpartanNash announced the impending acquisition of the regional grocer Fresh Encounter Inc. and its 49 stores across Ohio, Indiana and Kentucky. Fresh Encounter operated under the retail store banners Community Markets, Remke Markets, Chief Markets, and Needler's Fresh Market.

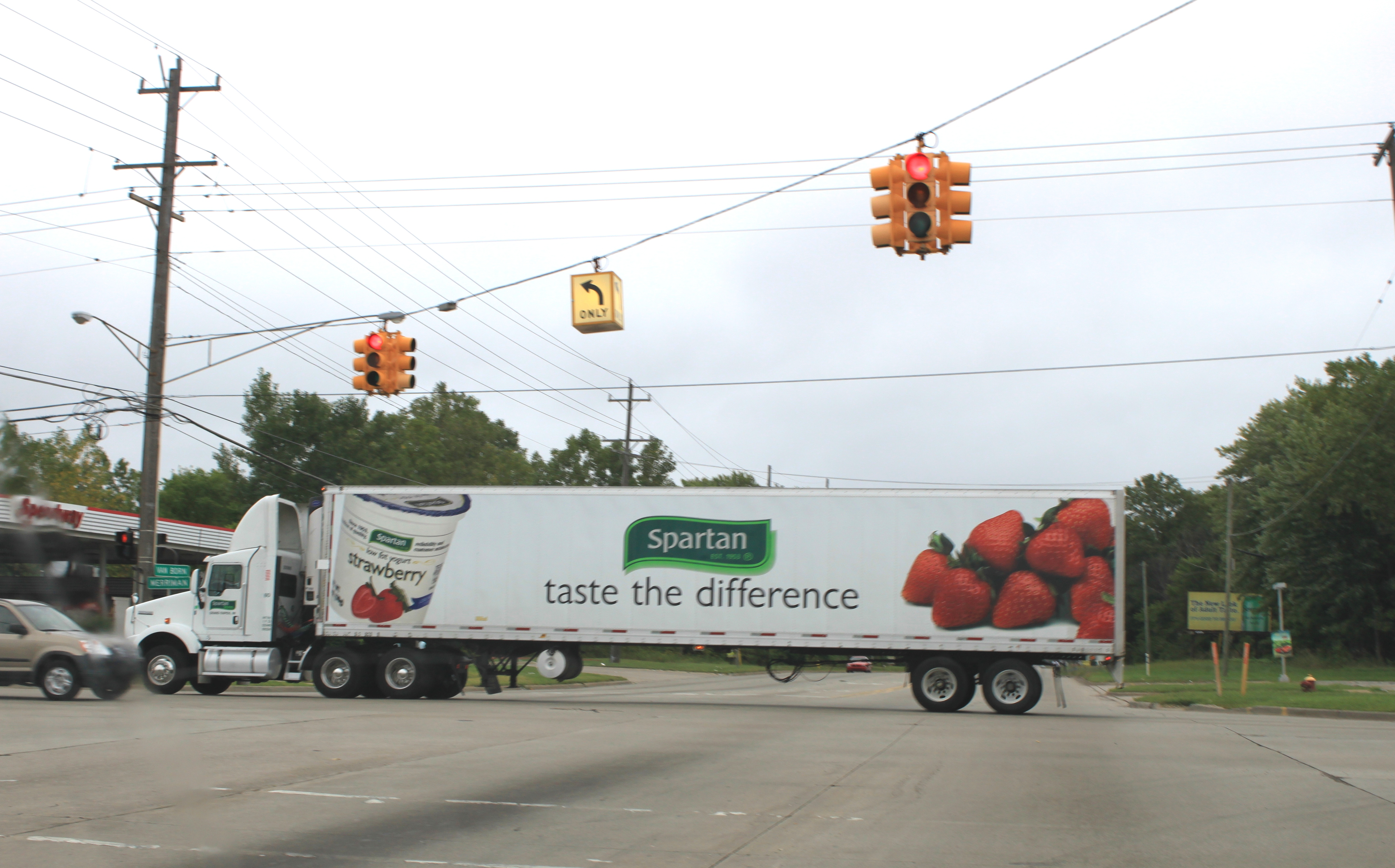
Spartan delivery truck, Romulus, Michigan

In June 2025, SpartanNash announced that it was beginning proceedings to be acquired by C&S Wholesale Grocers, the holding company that controls Piggly Wiggly; the deal is expected to close in late 2025 assuming nothing surprising happens in the merger process. The purchase was completed three months later.

== Retail chains ==
=== Current ===
No Frills Supermarkets logo

- Ada Fresh Market by Forest Hills Foods – Ada, Michigan
- D&W Fresh Market – Michigan
- Dillonvale IGA – Cincinnati, Ohio
- Family Fare Supermarkets – Minnesota, Nebraska, North Dakota, Michigan, South Dakota, Iowa, and Wisconsin
- Family Fresh Market – Minnesota, Nebraska, and Wisconsin
- Forest Hills Foods – Grand Rapids, Michigan
- Fresh Madison Market – Madison, Wisconsin
- Martin's Super Markets – Indiana and Michigan
- Metcalfe's Market – Wisconsin
- Supermercado Nuestra Familia – Omaha, Nebraska
- VG's Food Center Inc. (d/b/a VG's Grocery) – East Michigan
- Village Market – Elk Rapids, Michigan
- Remke Markets – Cincinnati Area
- Community Markets – Ohio
- Chief Supermarkets – NW Ohio
- Needler's – Indiana
- King Saver – Marion, Ohio
- Germantown Fresh Market – Germantown, Ohio

=== Former ===
- Bag 'N Save (1981–2015) switched over to the Family Fare name.
- Dan's Supermarket – North Dakota (until 2023) switched over to the Family Fare name.
- Econofoods – Minnesota, Wisconsin, South Dakota (until 2021)
- Family Thrift Center – South Dakota (until 2018)
- Felpausch (2007–2011) switched over to the Family Fare name.
- Food Town Supermarkets (2000–2003)
- Glen's Markets (1999–2014)
- The Pharm (2000–2008) deep discount drug stores
- Pick'n Save – Ironton and Van Wert, Ohio
- Valuland – Michigan
- Foster's Supermarket – Evart, Reed City, Lake City, Scottville, Grand Rapids Michigan
- No Frills – Iowa and Nebraska (until 2023) switched over to the Family Fare name.
- Sun Mart Foods – North Dakota (until 2014), Nebraska (until 2023) switched over to the Family Fare name.
