= Koby Language Center =

Koby Learning Group (formerly Koby USA/Koby Language Center) is a private English language school located in Novi, Michigan. Yoshihisa Kobayashi, founder and former president of Koby International Academy, founded the school in 2006 in Ann Arbor, Michigan, with the primary mission of teaching students with limited English proficiency the skills they need to succeed in academics, business, and life. Upon the passing of Mr. Kobayashi in 2016, the school was re-established by Christina Pierce as Koby Learning Group.

== Academic profile ==
Koby Learning Group offers various English language programs including the Comprehensive English Program, Intensive English Program, Test Preparation Programs for TOEFL (Test Preparation Program I [TPPI]), TOEIC (Test Preparation Program II [TPPII]), and SAT (Test Preparation Program III [TPPIII]), Academic English Program, Get Ready Program, Business English Program, English in Action, and Personalized English Program. Various summer English programs are also offered in June, July, and August. Programs are generally four-week terms, except for some of the two-week-long summer programs. Koby Learning Group also offers group lessons for select World Languages, including Japanese, Korean, and Mandarin Chinese.

Students include international students who are enrolled or entering grades K-12 in American schools, high school and post-graduate students who are preparing to take the TOEFL iBT (internet Based Test), and business professionals who need English skills for their profession and to prepare for the TOEIC test. The school also designs programs for businesses and individuals who have specific English needs and scheduling requirements.

The academic calendar runs month-to-month all year long. Students in the intensive English programs may spend up to eight months progressing from Introductory to Advanced English proficiency. All programs run continuously, and students decide on the number of terms in which to enroll.

== Campus and facilities ==
Prior to its current location, Koby was located above One World Market, a Japanese grocery store and sushi restaurant in Novi, Michigan.

On May 2, 2014, the school moved to its current location off W 10 Mile Rd in Novi.
