= D&W Fresh Market =

American grocery store chain

Coordinates: 42°49′32″N 85°41′05″W

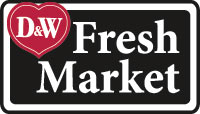

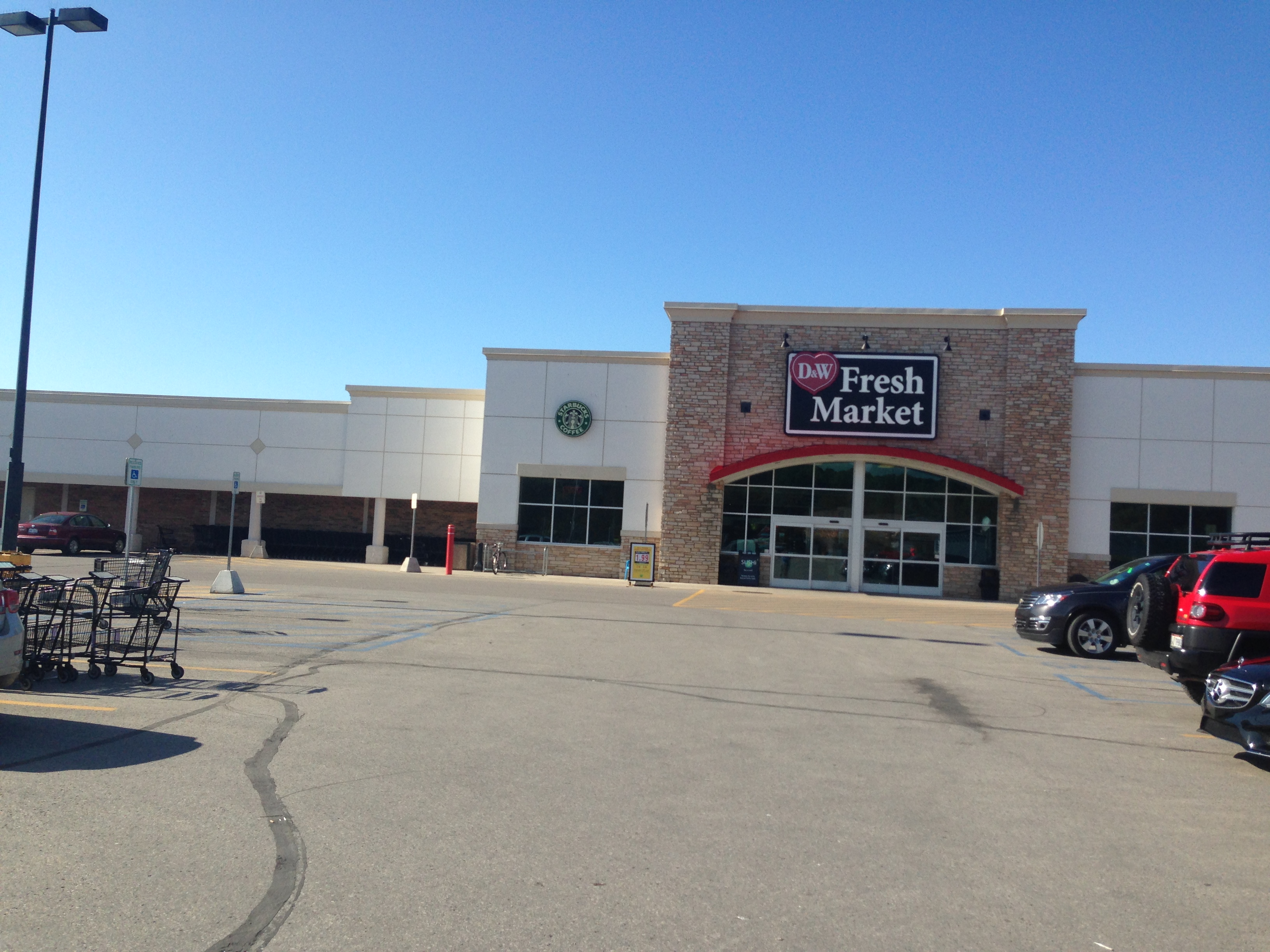
- D&W Fresh Market of Petoskey, Michigan, formerly Glen's Markets
- Company type: Subsidiary
- Industry: Retail/Supermarket
- Founded: 1943; 83 years ago in Grandville, Michigan
- Founders: Roy Woodrick; Sid DeVries
- Headquarters: Grand Rapids, Michigan, U.S.
- Number of locations: 10
- Key people: Craig Sturken (executive chairman) (Spartan Stores); Dennis Eidson (president and CEO (Spartan Stores))
- Products: Bakery, grocery, produce, delicatessen, seafood, bulk foods, snacks, health and beauty products, general merchandise
- Services: Supermarket; Online shopping and home delivery
- Revenue: US$26 million (2019)
- Number of employees: 2,000 (2019)
- Parent: SpartanNash
- Website: www.shopdwfreshmarket.com

D&W Fresh Market is an American regional supermarket chain owned and operated by SpartanNash, which acquired the chain in 2006. Founded in 1943 in Grandville, Michigan, the chain consists of ten stores in the Lower Peninsula of Michigan.

== History ==
D&W Fresh Market was founded in 1943 by Roy Woodrick and Sid DeVries. The first store was opened in Grandville, Michigan as an IGA retail grocery store. It was one of the first grocery stores in Grand Rapids to sell USDA Choice Beef exclusively.

In the early 1960s, DeVries and Woodrick created a new corporate entity for the operation by the name of D&W and designed the company's signature heart logo. Bob Woodrick, Roy Woodrick's son, became the president of D&W Food Centers in November 1967.

At its peak, D&W numbered approximately 27 stores in West Michigan from Three Rivers to Fremont. In its final years, Bob Woodrick served as the company's CEO and Doug Blease its president.

D&W's original signature logo.

In the fall of 2005, D&W implemented a cross-company cut of labor resources and operations. This included the selling of the company owned pharmacy to Minneapolis, Minnesota-based Prairie Stone Pharmacy, the closing of the 36th Street location in Grand Rapids, and over 100 job cuts. The store names were also re-branded from 'D&W Food Center(s)' to 'D&W Fresh Market(s)' for advertising purposes. It was revealed later that these moves were a part of the plan to save the financial resources and begin a new marketing campaign in preparation for a buy-out of the company by local competitor Spartan Stores.

D&W Food Center in Jenison, Michigan in 2005 before its conversion to the Family Fare banner.

== Spartan buyout ==
In December 2005, Spartan Stores announced plans to purchase the remaining 20 stores the company still operated for $45 million (US) claiming it planned to, in some way, retain the D&W name due to its heritage and recognition.

In February 2006, Spartan Stores announced that 10 of the newly purchased stores would continue to operate under the D&W Fresh Market banner. These stores included the Breton Village, Caledonia, Cascade, Gaslight Village, Grand Haven, Grandville, Holland, Parkview (Kalamazoo), Portage, and Rockford stores. Six other stores were converted into Family Fares, a banner name that Spartan had acquired in 1999. These stores included the locations known as Alpine, Breton Meadows, Burlingame, Fulton Heights, Jenison, and Kentwood. The four remaining stores; Northtown, Norton Shores, Walker, Wyoming and Zeeland were permanently closed and put up for sale. The Williamston Felpausch location was branded as the first mid-Michigan D&W store after Spartan purchased the 20-store Felpausch chain in 2007. Since the initial buyout, two additional D&W locations have been re-branded to the Family Fare banner, the Grandville location in 2010 and the Rockford location in 2012. The Portage D&W location on Romence Road was closed in March 2019.

These decisions were based on market analysis, future growth potential projections, and location amongst other things in an attempt for Spartan Stores to remain competitive amongst larger companies in the area such as Meijer, Target, and Walmart.

Spartan's purchase of D&W was officially completed in April 2006. Each store has been renovated and re-modeled, some more than others, to comply with and reflect the Spartan look. The Grand Haven and Holland stores joined several other Spartan Stores in being open 24 hours a day for the summer season.

D&W's Central Kitchen was retained by Spartan and provides a variety of deli products in both the D&W and Family Fare stores. The company's catering business, Fresh Thyme Catering, was sold by Spartan to a locally owned catering company in Grand Rapids.

The chain's northernmost location opened in 2014 in Petoskey, Michigan when the store was rebranded from Glen's Markets.

== Marketing slogan ==
The company's current slogans are "From the Everyday to the Extraordinary" and "Great Meals Start Here."

Past slogans have included; "Eat your ♥ out" "A nicer place to be!" "The Heart of Values" "Great Food, Great Service, Great Place to Shop" and "It's a matter of taste."
