= Evart Public Schools =

School district in Michigan

Address
- 321 N. Hemlock Street Evart, Osceola County, Michigan, 49631; United States

District information
- Grades: PreKindergarten–12
- Superintendent: Dan Boyer
- Schools: 3
- Budget: $15,108,000 2022–2023 expenditures
- NCES District ID: 2613560

Students and staff
- Students: 808 (2024–2025)
- Teachers: 55.43 (on an FTE basis) (2024–2025)
- Staff: 134.71 FTE (2024–2025)
- Student–teacher ratio: 14.58 (2024–2025)

Other information
- Website: evartps.org

Evart Public Schools is a public school district in Northern Michigan. In Osceola County, it serves Evart, the townships of Evart, Osceola, and Sylvan, and parts of the townships of Cedar, Hartwick, Hersey, Middle Branch, and Orient. It also serves part of Freeman Township in Clare County and parts of Grant Township and Chippewa Township in Mecosta County.

== History ==
The former Evart High School was built in 1923. It housed all grades in the district until 1966, when Evart Elementary was built. The current high school was built around 1997.

== Schools ==
Schools in Evart Public Schools district
School	Address	Notes
Evart High School	6221 95th St., Evart	Grades 9–12
Evart Middle School	321 N Hemlock St., Evart	Grades 5–8
Evart Elementary	515 N Cedar St., Evart	Grades PreK-4
