= Hersey River =

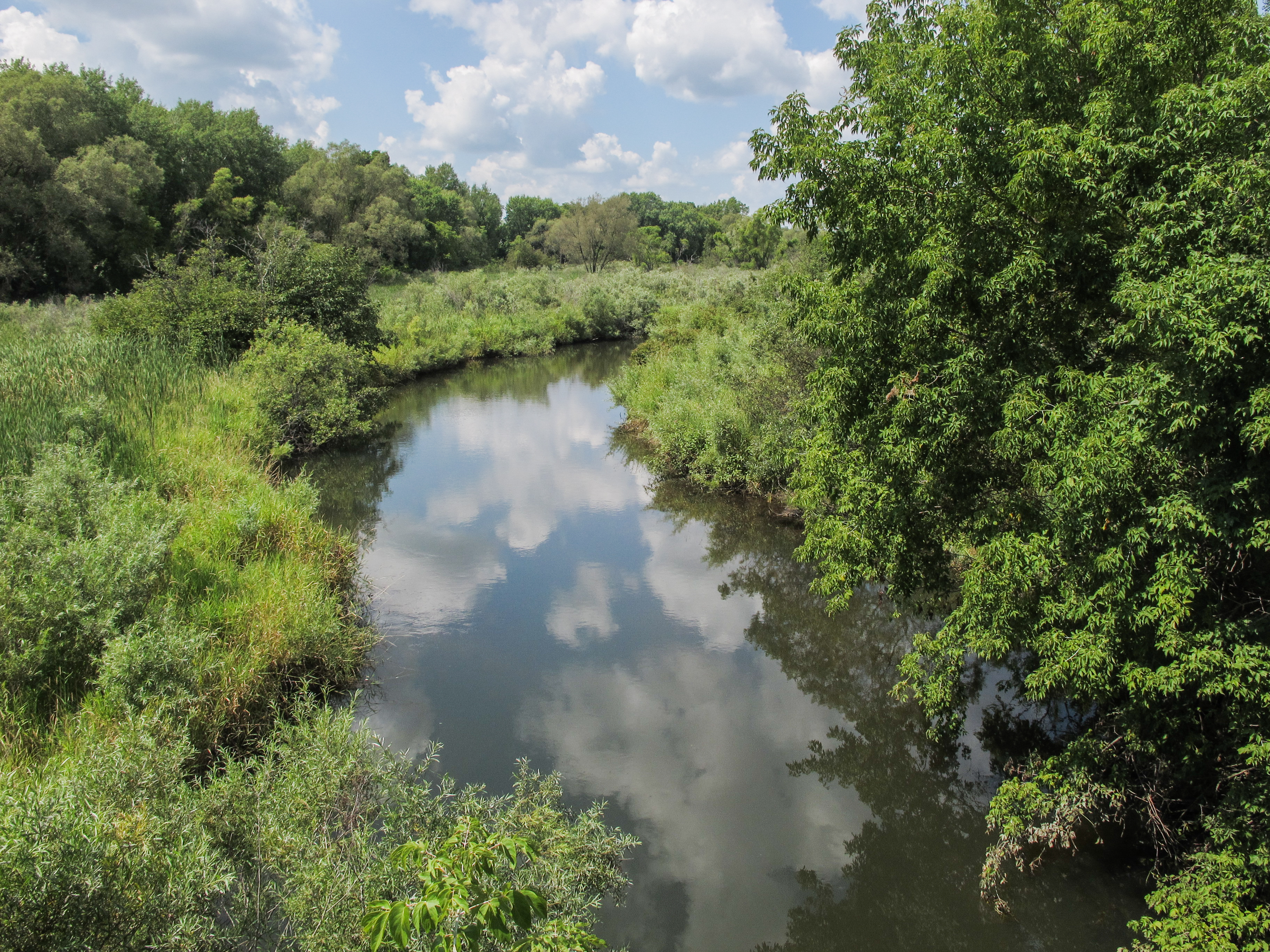
- The Hersey River in Reed City

Location
- Country: United States

Physical characteristics
- Source
  - location: Lincoln Township, Osceola County, Michigan
- Mouth
  - location: Muskegon River at Hersey
  - elevation: 995 feet (303 m)

Basin features
- Tributaries
  - left: Johnson Creek, Jewitt Creek, Burt Creek, Hersey Creek
  - right: Shaw Creek, Lawrence Creek, Lincoln Creek, East Branch Hersey Creek

The Hersey River is a 13.4-mile-long (21.6 km) stream in the Lower Peninsula of the U.S. state of Michigan. It rises in Lincoln Township in northwest Osceola County at the junction of Hersey Creek and the East Branch Hersey Creek at 43°50′55″N 85°25′59″W. For approximately the first two miles, the river flows southward just east of U.S. Route 131. US 131 crosses the river near the northern boundary of Richmond Township. The river continues southward into Lake No Sho Mo, formed by a dam just south of Nartron Field airport. The river continues southward under U.S. Route 10 into Reed City and turns to the east, continuing southeastward into the village of Hersey, where it empties into the Muskegon River at Blodgett's Landing Campground.

== Named tributaries ==
From the mouth:

- (left) Johnson Creek
  - (right) Hewitt Creek
  - (left) Knuth Creek
- (left) Jewitt Creek
- (right) Lawrence Creek
- (right) Lincoln Creek
  - Lincoln Lake
    - Todd Lake
      - Indian Creek
      - Johnson Creek
        - Beaver Dam Lake
- (right) East Branch Hersey Creek
  - (right) Olson Creek
    - Sherwood Lake
      - Sprague Lake
    - (right) Twin Creek
      - Twin Lake
- (left) Hersey Creek
  - (left) Burt Creek
  - (left) Kissinger Creek

== Drainage basin ==
The drainage basin includes all or portions of the following townships and municipalities:

- Osceola County
  - Cedar Township
  - Hersey
  - Hersey Township
  - Le Roy Township
  - Lincoln Township
  - Reed City
  - Richmond Township
  - Rose Lake Township
- Lake County
  - Chase Township
  - Ellsworth Township
  - Pinora Township

== See also ==
- List of rivers of Michigan
