= Evart =

Evart may refer to:

- Evart, Michigan, a city
  - Evart High School
- Evart Municipal Airport, a public airport near the city
- Evart Township, Michigan

== See also ==
- Evarts (disambiguation)
