= Reed City Area Public Schools =

School district in Michigan, United States

Address
- 220 W. Lincoln Ave, Suite 1 Reed City, Osceola County, Michigan, 49677; United States

District information
- Grades: Pre-Kindergarten-12
- Superintendent: Michael Sweet
- Schools: 3
- Budget: $21,044,000 2022-2023 expenditures
- NCES District ID: 2629490

Students and staff
- Students: 1,456 (2024-2025)
- Teachers: 85.95 (on an FTE basis) (2024-2025)
- Staff: 206.53 FTE (2024-2025)
- Student–teacher ratio: 16.94 (2024-2025)

Other information
- Website: www.reedcityschools.org

Reed City Area Public Schools is a public school district in West Michigan.

== Geographic Area ==
In Osceola County, it serves Hersey, Reed City, Richmond Township, and parts of the townships of Cedar, Hersey, and Lincoln. In Lake County, it serves Chase Township and part of Pinora Township. In Mecosta County, it serves parts of Grant and Green Townships. It also serves part of Barton Township in Newaygo County.

== History ==
Reed City's first school was established in 1872 above a downtown store. The furniture was old planks and wooden boxes, and a local carpenter made the blackboard. Enrollment grew quickly and the school moved to a nearby church. By 1874, the public school had its own dedicated building, with two stories and several classrooms. The first high school class graduated in 1884.

Voters approved funds for a new grade school/high school building in 1893. Hersey had a high school of its own since at least 1897, when it is mentioned in The Saginaw News as a competitor in the annual Field Day of High Schools of Northern Michigan. Among the events was a baseball game between Hersey and Reed City High Schools, which ended in a tie.

The next Reed City High School was built in 1923, and would serve the community until the current high school opened, and then serve as the district's middle school. The current middle school opened in 1993.

Hersey's school district operated its high school until the end of the 1956-1957 school year, but it only had 44 students. Hersey retained its independence and rebuilt its school in 1960, before ultimately consolidating with Reed City in 1963. It was one of many outlying rural school districts that consolidated with Reed City's district between 1950 and 1968, bringing the district to its current geographic area that spans four counties.

The current Reed City High School was dedicated in November 1963.

== Schools ==
Schools in Reed City Area Public Schools district
School	Address	Notes
Reed City High School	225 W Church Ave., Reed City	Grades 9-12. Built 1963.
Reed City Middle School	233 W Church Ave., Reed City	Grades 5-8. Built 1993.
G.T. Norman Elementary	338 W Lincoln Ave., Reed City	Grades PreK-4. Built 1954. Additions and renovations built 2005. Preschool annex built 1950.
