= Highland Township, Michigan =

Highland Township is the name of some places in the U.S. state of Michigan:

- Highland Township, Oakland County, Michigan
- Highland Township, Osceola County, Michigan
