= Sherman Township, Osceola County, Michigan =

Sherman Township, Michigan
- Civil township
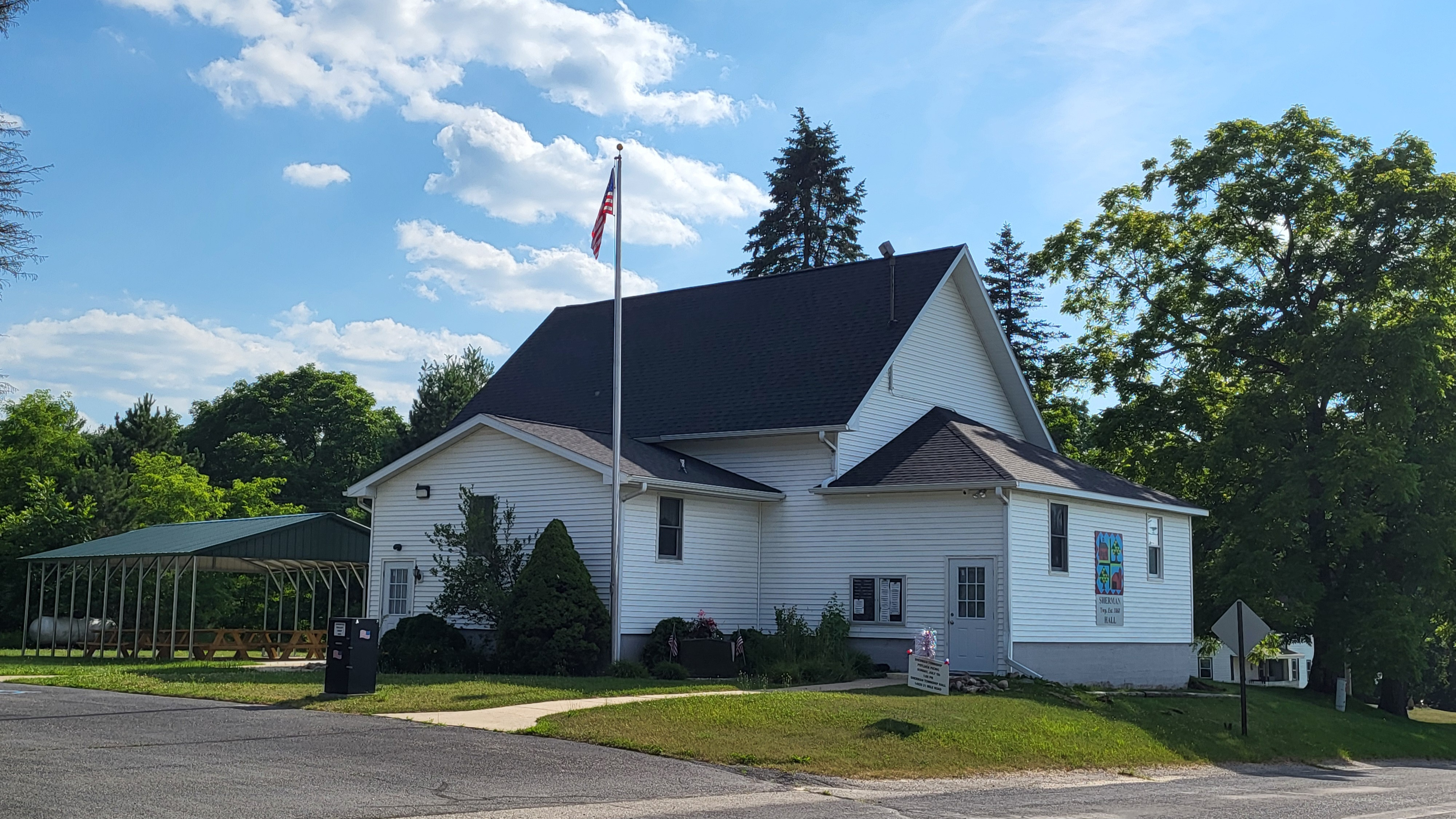
- Sherman Township Hall

- Location within Osceola County

- Location within the state of Michigan Location within the United States
- Coordinates: 44°07′39″N 85°23′33″W
- Country: United States
- State: Michigan
- County: Osceola
- Established: 1870

Government
  - Supervisor: David Eggle
  - Clerk: Bethany Bolduc

Area
  - Total: 37.25 sq mi (96.48 km^{2})
  - Land: 37.03 sq mi (95.91 km^{2})
  - Water: 0.22 sq mi (0.57 km^{2})
- Elevation: 1,329 ft (405 m)

Population (2020)
  - Total: 991
  - Density: 26.8/sq mi (10.3/km^{2})
- Time zone: UTC-5 (Eastern (EST))
  - Summer (DST): UTC-4 (EDT)
- ZIP code(s): 49665 (Marion); 49688 (Tustin)
- Area code: 231
- FIPS code: 26-73280
- GNIS feature ID: 1627077
- Website: Official website

Sherman Township is in Osceola County in the U.S. state of Michigan. The population was 991 at the 2020 census.

== Communities ==
- Dighton is an unincorporated community in the township, at 44.0916N/85.34734W. It had a post office from 1884 until 1955.

== Geography ==
According to the United States Census Bureau, the township has a total area of 37.3 square miles (96.6 km^{2}), of which 37.0 square miles (96.0 km^{2}) is land and 0.2 square mile (0.6 km^{2}) (0.62%) is water.

== Demographics ==
As of the 2000 United States census, there were 1,081 people, 380 households, and 305 families in the township. The population density was 29.2 inhabitants per square mile (11.3/km^{2}). There were 501 housing units at an average density of 13.5 per square mile (5.2/km^{2}). The racial makeup of the township was 98.15% White, 0.83% Native American, 0.28% Asian, 0.09% from other races, and 0.65% from two or more races. Hispanic or Latino of any race were 0.56% of the population.

There were 380 households, out of which 41.3% had children under the age of 18 living with them, 63.2% were married couples living together, 10.5% had a female householder with no husband present, and 19.7% were non-families. 14.2% of all households were made up of individuals, and 3.2% had someone living alone who was 65 years of age or older. The average household size was 2.82 and the average family size was 3.09.

The township population contained 30.2% under the age of 18, 6.5% from 18 to 24, 28.4% from 25 to 44, 24.1% from 45 to 64, and 10.7% who were 65 years of age or older. The median age was 35 years. For every 100 females, there were 108.3 males. For every 100 females age 18 and over, there were 100.0 males.

The median income for a household in the township was $42,569, and the median income for a family was $44,531. Males had a median income of $32,130 versus $23,359 for females. The per capita income for the township was $16,785. About 10.6% of families and 13.4% of the population were below the poverty line, including 16.5% of those under age 18 and 10.2% of those age 65 or over.
