= Highland Township, Osceola County, Michigan =

Highland Township, Michigan
- Civil township
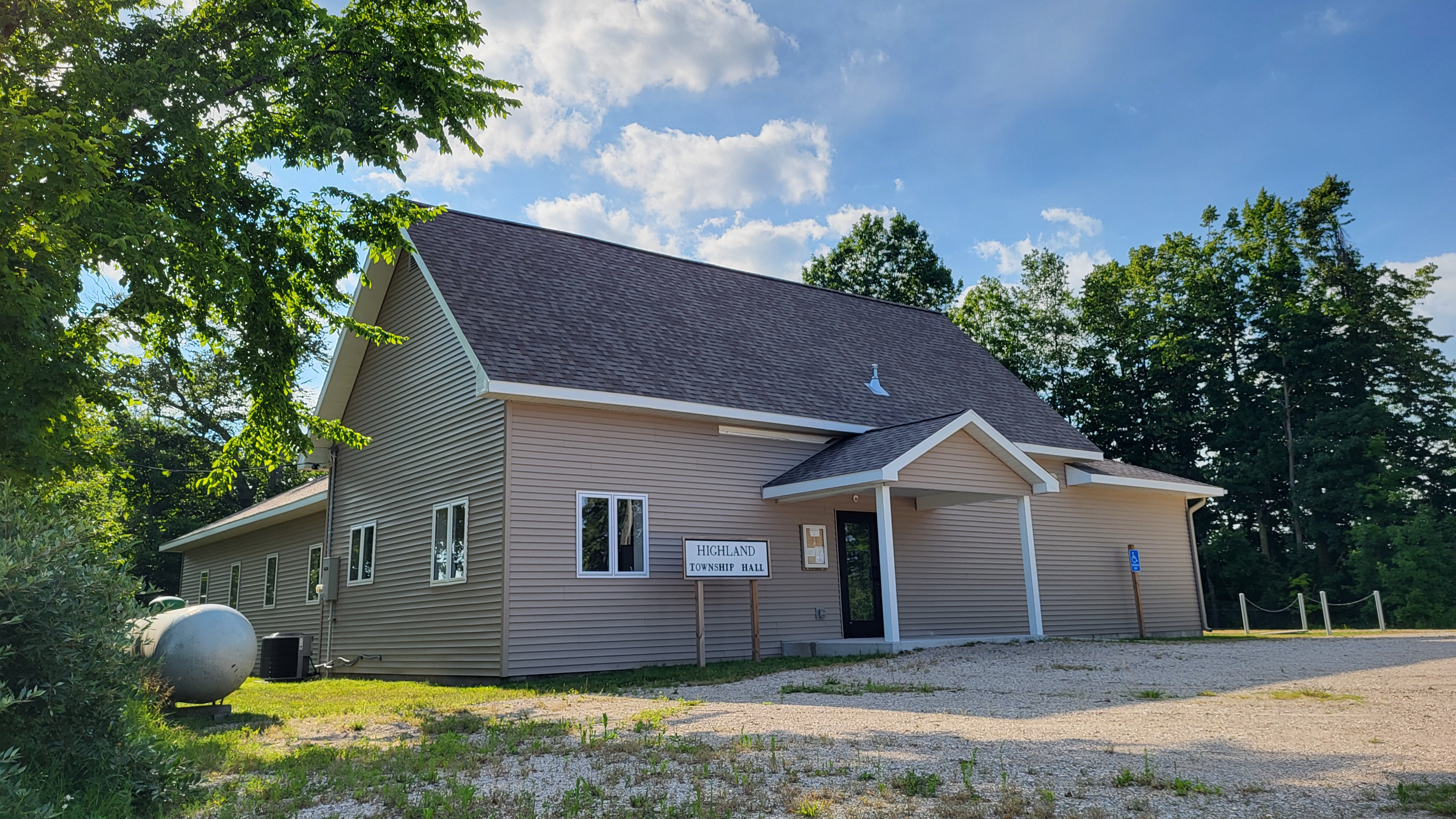
- Highland Township Hall

- Location within Osceola County

- Location within the state of Michigan Location within the United States
- Coordinates: 44°06′59″N 85°16′05″W
- Country: United States
- State: Michigan
- County: Osceola
- Established: 1871

Government
  - Supervisor: Derek Wing
  - Clerk: Larissa Avery

Area
  - Total: 37.42 sq mi (96.92 km^{2})
  - Land: 37.38 sq mi (96.81 km^{2})
  - Water: 0.039 sq mi (0.10 km^{2})
- Elevation: 630 ft (192 m)

Population (2020)
  - Total: 1,148
  - Density: 30.7/sq mi (11.9/km^{2})
- Time zone: UTC-5 (Eastern (EST))
  - Summer (DST): UTC-4 (EDT)
- ZIP code(s): 49655 (Le Roy); 49665 (Marion); 49688 (Tustin)
- Area code: 231
- FIPS code: 26-38100
- GNIS feature ID: 1626479
- Website: Official website

Highland Township is a civil township of Osceola County in the U.S. state of Michigan. The population was 1,148 at the 2020 census.

== Communities ==
There are no incorporated municipalities or large population centers in the township. There are some named unincorporated communities or locales in the township:

- Highland, centered on the junction of 23 Mile Road and 90th Avenue at 44°08′44″N 85°15′59″W
- Ina, centered on the junction of 21 Mile Road and 100th Avenue at 44°07′01″N 85°17′12″W A post office operated from March 1899 until December 1907.
- Pisgah Heights, on 70th Avenue between 19 Mile and 20 Mile roads at 44°05′40″N 85°13′34″W near an old railroad grade.
- The village of Le Roy is to the southwest. The post office (named "Leroy") with ZIP code, 49655, also serves the southwest corner of the township.
- The village of Marion is to the east and the Marion ZIP code, 49665, serves the eastern half of the township.
- The village of Tustin is to the west and the Tustin ZIP code, 49688, serves the western portion of the township.

== Geography ==
According to the United States Census Bureau, the township has a total area of 37.4 square miles (97 km^{2}), of which 37.3 square miles (97 km^{2}) is land and 0.04 square miles (0.10 km^{2}) (0.11%) is water.

== Demographics ==
As of the census of 2000, there were 1,207 people, 444 households, and 343 families residing in the township. The population density was 32.3 inhabitants per square mile (12.5/km^{2}). There were 559 housing units at an average density of 15.0 per square mile (5.8/km^{2}). The racial makeup of the township was 98.59% White, 0.66% African American, 0.17% Native American, 0.08% from other races, and 0.50% from two or more races. Hispanic or Latino of any race were 1.49% of the population.

There were 444 households, out of which 36.9% had children under the age of 18 living with them, 64.6% were married couples living together, 6.8% had a female householder with no husband present, and 22.7% were non-families. 20.0% of all households were made up of individuals, and 9.0% had someone living alone who was 65 years of age or older. The average household size was 2.72 and the average family size was 3.11.

In the township the population was spread out, with 29.7% under the age of 18, 7.4% from 18 to 24, 29.2% from 25 to 44, 21.5% from 45 to 64, and 12.3% who were 65 years of age or older. The median age was 35 years. For every 100 females, there were 105.3 males. For every 100 females age 18 and over, there were 103.1 males.

The median income for a household in the township was $32,772, and the median income for a family was $35,000. Males had a median income of $27,557 versus $22,292 for females. The per capita income for the township was $13,741. About 8.6% of families and 12.0% of the population were below the poverty line, including 16.3% of those under age 18 and 13.4% of those age 65 or over.
