= Burdell Township, Michigan =

- Civil township
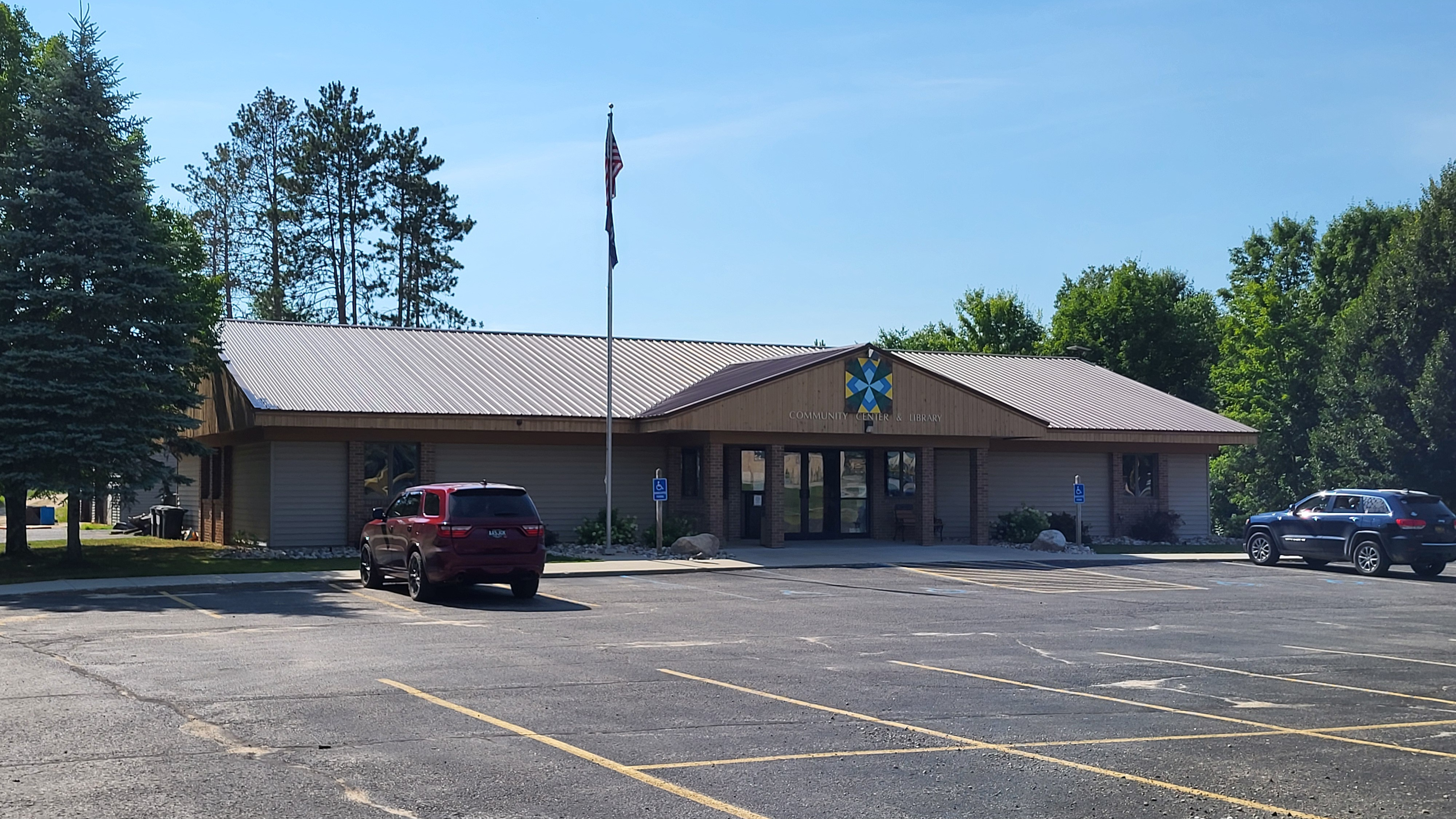
- Community center and library in Tustin

- Location within Osceola County (red) and the administered village of Tustin (pink)

- Location within the state of Michigan Location within the United States
- Coordinates: 44°06′37″N 85°29′40″W
- Country: United States
- State: Michigan
- County: Osceola
- Established: 1871

Government
  - Supervisor: Dean Molnar
  - Clerk: Richard Dunlap

Area
  - Total: 37.54 sq mi (97.23 km^{2})
  - Land: 37.33 sq mi (96.68 km^{2})
  - Water: 0.21 sq mi (0.54 km^{2})
- Elevation: 1,161 ft (354 m)

Population (2020)
  - Total: 1,410
  - Density: 37.8/sq mi (14.6/km^{2})
- Time zone: UTC-5 (Eastern (EST))
  - Summer (DST): UTC-4 (EDT)
- ZIP code(s): 49655 (LeRoy); 49688 (Tustin)
- Area code: 231
- FIPS code: 26-11680
- GNIS feature ID: 1626002
- Website: Official website

Burdell Township is a civil township of Osceola County in the U.S. state of Michigan. As of the 2020 census, the township population was 1,410.

== Geography ==
According to the United States Census Bureau, the township has a total area of 37.6 square miles (97 km^{2}), of which 37.4 square miles (97 km^{2}) is land and 0.2 square miles (0.52 km^{2}) (0.56%) is water.

== Demographics ==
As of the census of 2000, there were 1,241 people, 478 households, and 351 families residing in the township. The population density was 33.2 inhabitants per square mile (12.8/km^{2}). There were 713 housing units at an average density of 19.1 per square mile (7.4/km^{2}). The racial makeup of the township was 98.55% White, 0.08% African American, 0.32% Native American, 0.24% Asian, and 0.81% from two or more races. Hispanic or Latino of any race were 0.48% of the population.

There were 478 households, out of which 31.4% had children under the age of 18 living with them, 61.3% were married couples living together, 8.4% had a female householder with no husband present, and 26.4% were non-families. 20.5% of all households were made up of individuals, and 9.0% had someone living alone who was 65 years of age or older. The average household size was 2.59 and the average family size was 3.00.

In the township the population was spread out, with 26.0% under the age of 18, 6.9% from 18 to 24, 28.0% from 25 to 44, 26.0% from 45 to 64, and 13.1% who were 65 years of age or older. The median age was 39 years. For every 100 females, there were 101.1 males. For every 100 females age 18 and over, there were 97.8 males.

The median income for a household in the township was $35,481, and the median income for a family was $40,815. Males had a median income of $30,521 versus $20,294 for females. The per capita income for the township was $15,375. About 8.8% of families and 13.4% of the population were below the poverty line, including 15.5% of those under age 18 and 9.1% of those age 65 or over.
