= Evarts =

Evarts can refer to:

== People ==
- Edward Evarts (1926–1985), American neuroscientist
- Katharine Evarts (1898–2006), American politician
- Jeremiah Evarts (1781–1831), Christian missionary, reformer and activist for the rights of American Indians
- Maxwell Evarts (1862–1913), American lawyer and politician, son of William M. Evarts
- Milo Evarts (1913–1942), World War II United States Navy Cross recipient
- William M. Evarts (1818–1901), American lawyer and politician, United States Secretary of State, Attorney General and Senator from New York
- Evarts Worcester Farr (1840–1880), American politician
- Evarts Ambrose Graham (1883–1957), American academic, physician and surgeon
- Evarts Boutell Greene (1870–1947), American historian
- Evarts G. Loomis (1910–2003), homeopath, surgeon, author, lecturer
- Evarts Tracy (1868–1922), of the American architectural firm Tracy and Swartwout

== Places ==
- Evarts, Alberta, Canada, an unincorporated community
- Evarts, Illinois, United States, an unincorporated community
- Evarts, Kentucky, United States, a home rule-class city in Harlan County

== Ships ==
- Evarts-class destroyer escort
  - USS Evarts (DE-5), lead ship of the class

== Other uses ==
- Battle of Evarts, a mining labor conflict in Kentucky
- Evarts High School, Harlan County, Kentucky

== See also ==
- Judiciary Act of 1891, also known as the Evarts Act, after its primary sponsor, Senator William M. Evarts
- Evart (disambiguation)
