= Hartwick Township, Michigan =

- Civil township
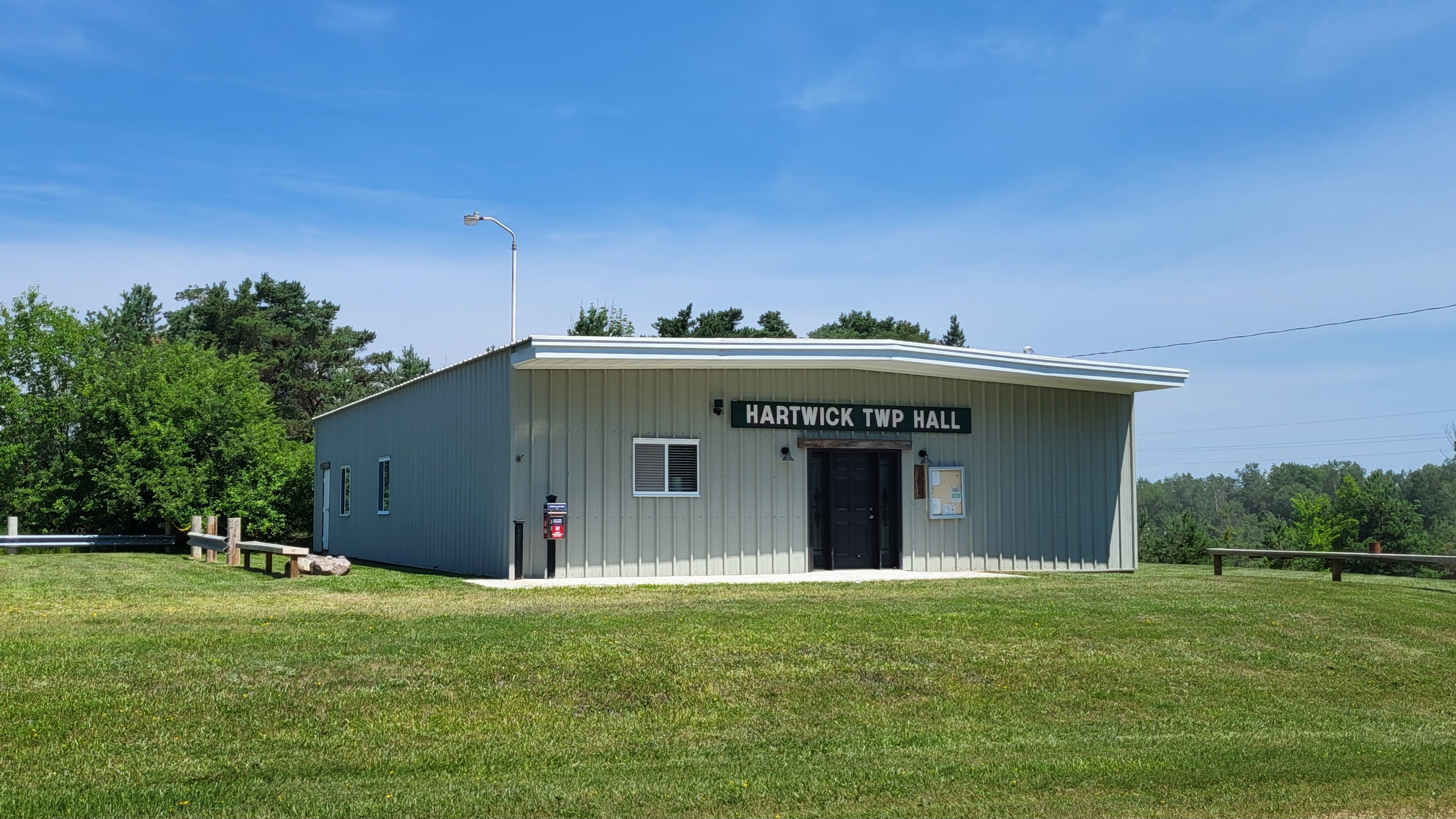
- Hartwick Township Hall

- Location within Osceola County

- Location within the state of Michigan Location within the United States
- Coordinates: 44°02′31″N 85°16′46″W
- Country: United States
- State: Michigan
- County: Osceola
- Established: 1871

Government
  - Supervisor: Randy VanBuren
  - Clerk: Shelley Muczynski

Area
  - Total: 35.49 sq mi (91.92 km^{2})
  - Land: 35.00 sq mi (90.65 km^{2})
  - Water: 0.49 sq mi (1.27 km^{2})
- Elevation: 1,302 ft (397 m)

Population (2020)
  - Total: 591
  - Density: 16.9/sq mi (6.5/km^{2})
- Time zone: UTC-5 (Eastern (EST))
  - Summer (DST): UTC-4 (EDT)
- ZIP code(s): 49631 (Evart); 49655 (LeRoy); 49665 (Marion); 49688 (Tustin)
- Area code: 231
- FIPS code: 26-37060
- GNIS feature ID: 1626447
- Website: Official website

Hartwick Township is a civil township of Osceola County in the U.S. state of Michigan. The population was 591 at the 2020 census.

== Geography ==
According to the United States Census Bureau, the township has a total area of 35.5 square miles (92 km^{2}), of which 35.0 square miles (91 km^{2}) is land and 0.5 square miles (1.3 km^{2}) (1.38%) is water.

== Demographics ==
As of the census of 2000, there were 629 people, 236 households, and 184 families residing in the township. The population density was 18.0 inhabitants per square mile (6.9/km^{2}). There were 503 housing units at an average density of 14.4 per square mile (5.6/km^{2}). The racial makeup of the township was 98.89% White, 0.79% from other races, and 0.32% from two or more races. Hispanic or Latino of any race were 1.27% of the population.

There were 236 households, out of which 27.5% had children under the age of 18 living with them, 68.6% were married couples living together, 5.1% had a female householder with no husband present, and 22.0% were non-families. 18.2% of all households were made up of individuals, and 8.1% had someone living alone who was 65 years of age or older. The average household size was 2.67 and the average family size was 2.98.

In the township the population was spread out, with 25.6% under the age of 18, 6.8% from 18 to 24, 24.3% from 25 to 44, 22.6% from 45 to 64, and 20.7% who were 65 years of age or older. The median age was 41 years. For every 100 females, there were 94.1 males. For every 100 females age 18 and over, there were 97.5 males.

The median income for a household in the township was $34,286, and the median income for a family was $36,250. Males had a median income of $30,781 versus $25,833 for females. The per capita income for the township was $15,262. About 11.4% of families and 17.4% of the population were below the poverty line, including 31.8% of those under age 18 and 6.5% of those age 65 or over.
