= William C. Giese =

20th century American educator and politician

William C. Giese (April 18, 1886 – April 15, 1966) was an American educator and Republican politician from Racine, Wisconsin. He served one term in the Wisconsin State Assembly after his career in education, from 1953 to 1955. Giese Elementary School in Racine was named for him.

== Biography ==
Born in Reed City, Michigan, Giese also grew up there. He attended local schools, graduating from Reed City High School. He received his bachelor's degree from Kalamazoo College and his master's degree from Columbia University in New York City. He served in the United States Army during World War I. Giese worked as a teacher, principal, and high school football coach in Menominee, Michigan.

In 1919 he moved to Racine, Wisconsin as principal of the Racine high school. He later served as principal of Park High School. In 1933 Giese was selected as superintendent of the city's public school system, a position he held until retiring in 1951.

Giese next entered politics. Elected as a Republican, he served one term in the Wisconsin State Assembly, from 1953 to 1955. He died in Racine, Wisconsin.
