= Middle Branch Township, Michigan =

- Civil township
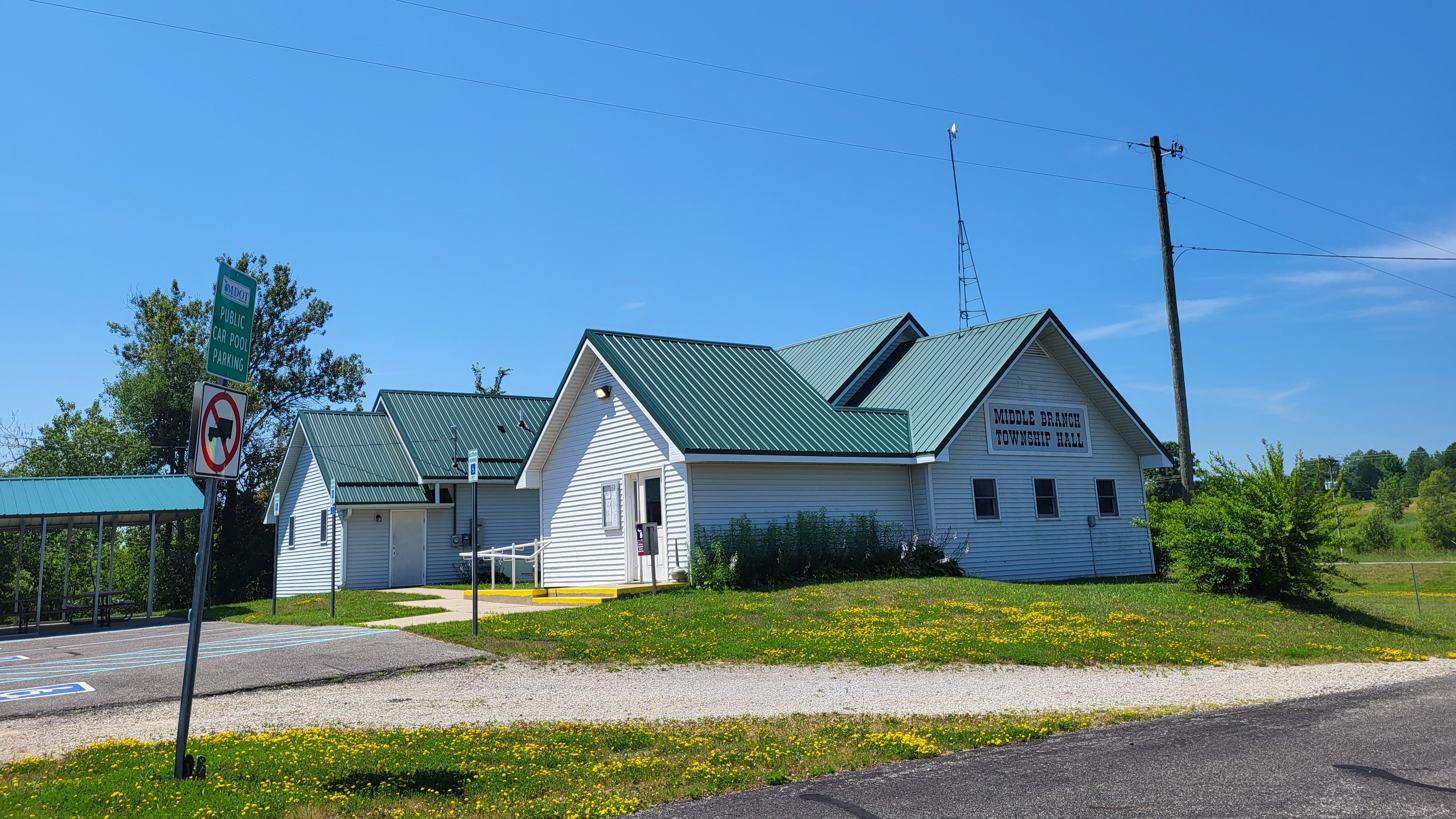
- Middle Branch Township Hall

- Location within Osceola County

- Location within the state of Michigan Location within the United States
- Coordinates: 44°01′05″N 85°08′16″W
- Country: United States
- State: Michigan
- County: Osceola
- Established: 1867

Government
  - Supervisor: Glenn Wilson
  - Clerk: Richielene Beebe

Area
  - Total: 35.53 sq mi (92.02 km^{2})
  - Land: 35.50 sq mi (91.94 km^{2})
  - Water: 0.031 sq mi (0.08 km^{2})
- Elevation: 1,120 ft (340 m)

Population (2020)
  - Total: 775
  - Density: 21.8/sq mi (8.4/km^{2})
- Time zone: UTC-5 (Eastern (EST))
  - Summer (DST): UTC-4 (EDT)
- ZIP code(s): 49665 (Marion)
- Area code: 231
- FIPS code: 26-53660
- GNIS feature ID: 1626734
- Website: Official website

Middle Branch Township is a civil township of Osceola County in the U.S. state of Michigan. The population was 775 at the 2020 census.

== Geography ==
According to the United States Census Bureau, the township has a total area of 35.5 square miles (92 km^{2}), of which 35.5 square miles (92 km^{2}) is land and 0.04 square miles (0.10 km^{2}) (0.08%) is water.

== Demographics ==
As of the census of 2000, there were 858 people, 344 households, and 250 families residing in the township. The population density was 24.2 inhabitants per square mile (9.3/km^{2}). There were 553 housing units at an average density of 15.6 per square mile (6.0/km^{2}). The racial makeup of the township was 97.79% White, 0.12% African American, 0.23% Native American, and 1.86% from two or more races. Hispanic or Latino of any race were 1.40% of the population.

There were 344 households, out of which 31.1% had children under the age of 18 living with them, 59.9% were married couples living together, 7.8% had a female householder with no husband present, and 27.3% were non-families. 23.3% of all households were made up of individuals, and 11.3% had someone living alone who was 65 years of age or older. The average household size was 2.48 and the average family size was 2.89.

In the township the population was spread out, with 24.6% under the age of 18, 5.5% from 18 to 24, 28.9% from 25 to 44, 22.8% from 45 to 64, and 18.2% who were 65 years of age or older. The median age was 40 years. For every 100 females, there were 98.6 males. For every 100 females age 18 and over, there were 92.0 males.

The median income for a household in the township was $27,014, and the median income for a family was $32,000. Males had a median income of $30,703 versus $22,031 for females. The per capita income for the township was $13,448. About 19.2% of families and 18.9% of the population were below the poverty line, including 22.9% of those under age 18 and 16.0% of those age 65 or over.
