= Orient Township, Michigan =

- Civil township
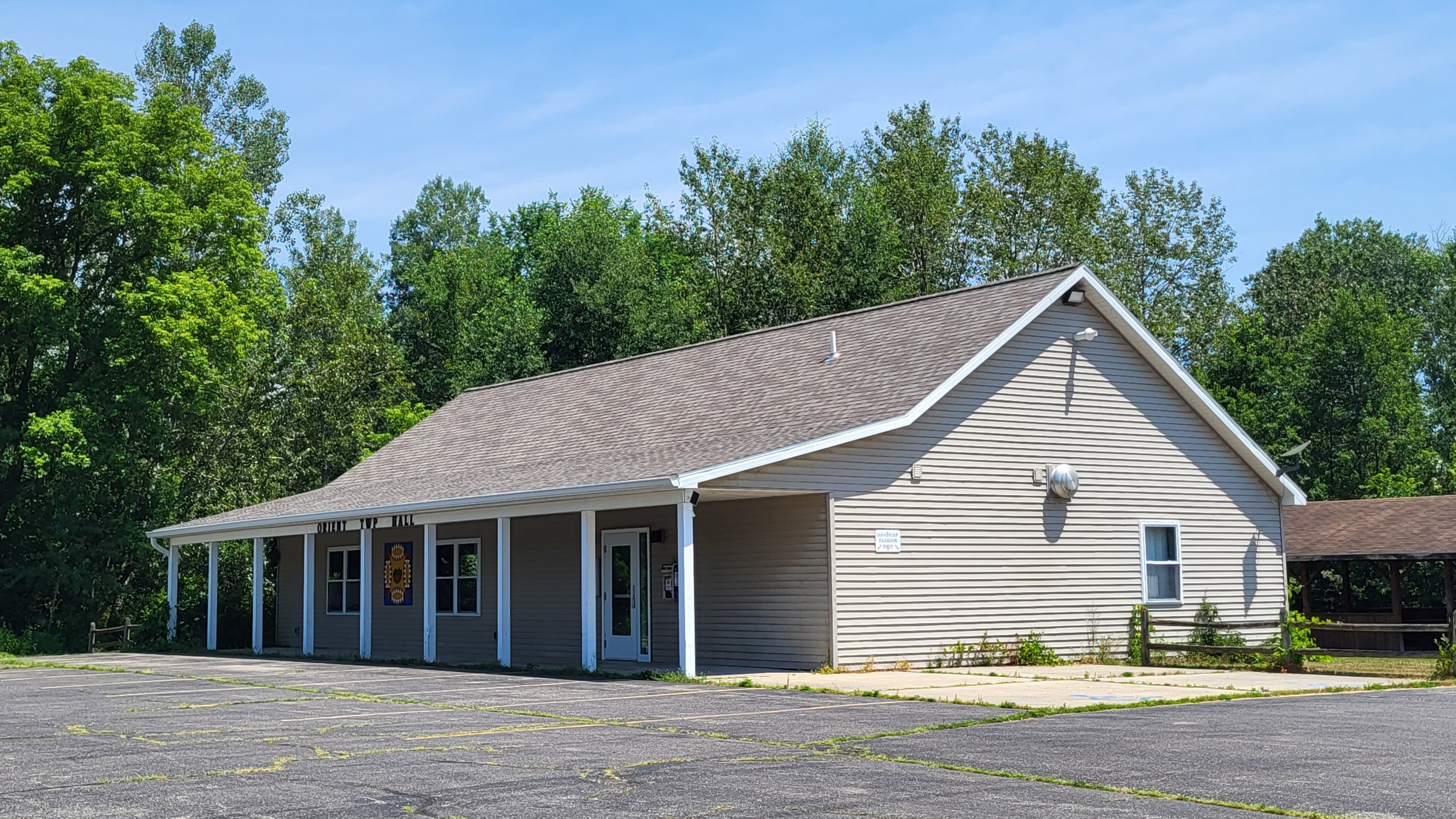
- Orient Township Hall

- Location within Osceola County

- Location within the state of Michigan Location within the United States
- Coordinates: 43°51′38″N 85°08′59″W
- Country: United States
- State: Michigan
- County: Osceola
- Established: 1871

Government
  - Supervisor: Matt Tiedt
  - Clerk: Mark Sochocki

Area
  - Total: 35.42 sq mi (91.74 km^{2})
  - Land: 34.80 sq mi (90.13 km^{2})
  - Water: 0.62 sq mi (1.61 km^{2})
- Elevation: 1,024 ft (312 m)

Population (2020)
  - Total: 733
  - Density: 21.1/sq mi (8.1/km^{2})
- Time zone: UTC-5 (Eastern (EST))
  - Summer (DST): UTC-4 (EDT)
- ZIP code(s): 48632 (Lake); 49679 (Sears)
- Area code: 231
- FIPS code: 26-61080
- GNIS feature ID: 1626858
- Website: Official website

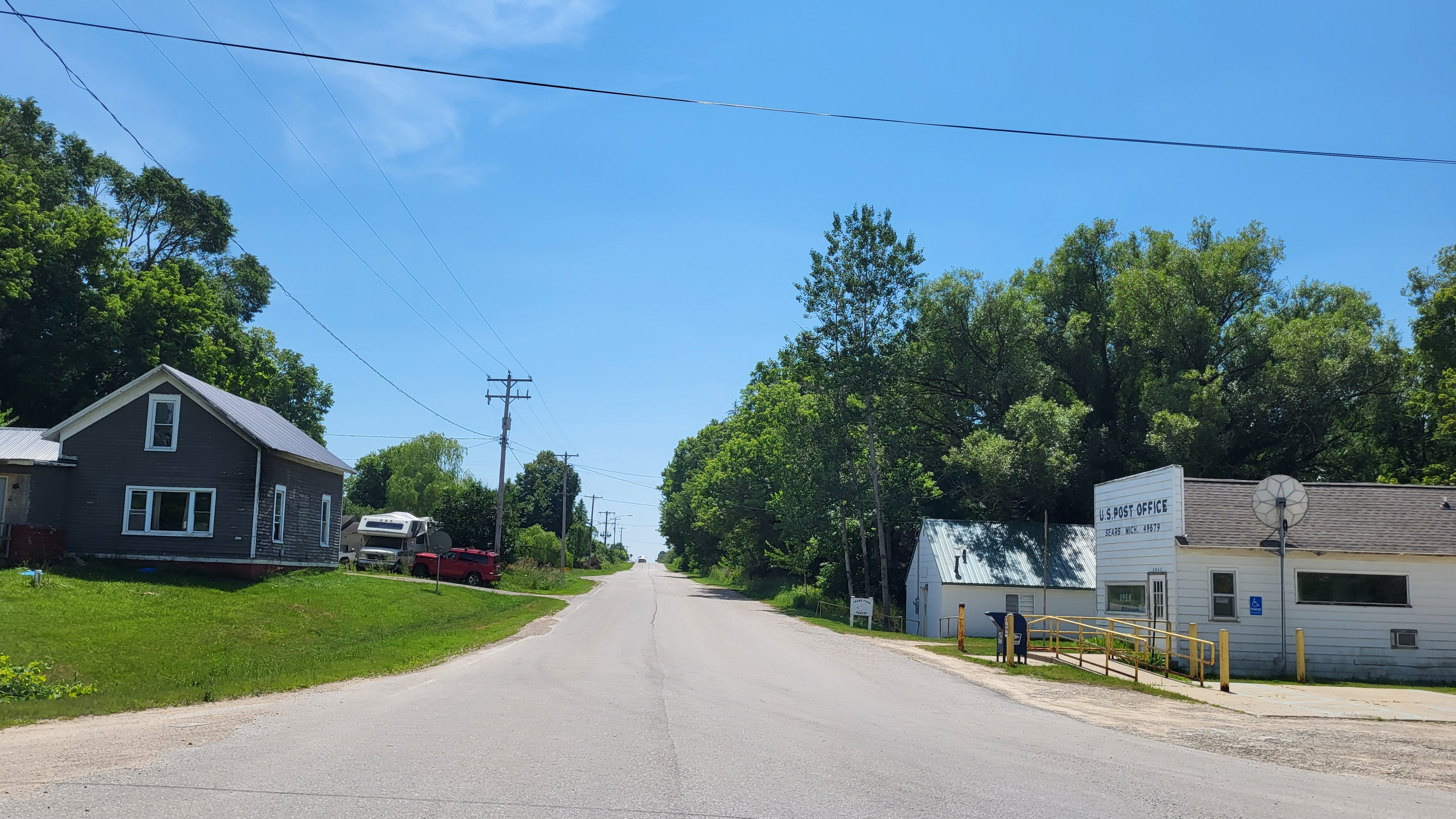
Unincorporated community of Sears

Orient Township is a civil township of Osceola County in the U.S. state of Michigan. The population was 733 at the 2020 census.

== Communities ==
There are no incorporated municipalities in the township. There are a few unincorporated communities:

- Sears is a small farming community in the northwest part of the township, between US 10 and the railroad line, originally built the Flint and Pere Marquette Railway (later the Pere Marquette Railway. It has a medium-sized Amish community along with their stores and farms. The Sears post office serves ZIP code 49679, which covers most of Orient Township and the eastern half of Sylvan Township to the north along with a small portion of eastern Evart Township.

== Geography ==
According to the United States Census Bureau, the township has a total area of 35.4 square miles (92 km^{2}), of which 34.8 square miles (90 km^{2}) is land and 0.6 square miles (1.6 km^{2}) (1.75%) is water.

== Demographics ==
As of the census of 2000, there were 803 people, 318 households, and 235 families residing in the township. The population density was 23.1 per square mile (8.9/km^{2}). There were 562 housing units at an average density of 16.1 per square mile (6.2/km^{2}). The racial makeup of the township was 98.13% White, 0.37% African American, 0.25% Asian, and 1.25% from two or more races. Hispanic or Latino of any race were 0.62% of the population.

There were 318 households, out of which 26.4% had children under the age of 18 living with them, 61.3% were married couples living together, 7.5% had a female householder with no husband present, and 26.1% were non-families. 21.7% of all households were made up of individuals, and 10.7% had someone living alone who was 65 years of age or older. The average household size was 2.51 and the average family size was 2.90.

In the township the population was spread out, with 23.7% under the age of 18, 8.5% from 18 to 24, 21.0% from 25 to 44, 30.4% from 45 to 64, and 16.4% who were 65 years of age or older. The median age was 43 years. For every 100 females, there were 102.8 males. For every 100 females age 18 and over, there were 101.6 males.

The median income for a household in the township was $32,024, and the median income for a family was $37,250. Males had a median income of $29,688 versus $23,214 for females. The per capita income for the township was $14,931. About 10.0% of families and 14.6% of the population were below the poverty line, including 24.6% of those under age 18 and 15.6% of those age 65 or over.
