= Evart High School =

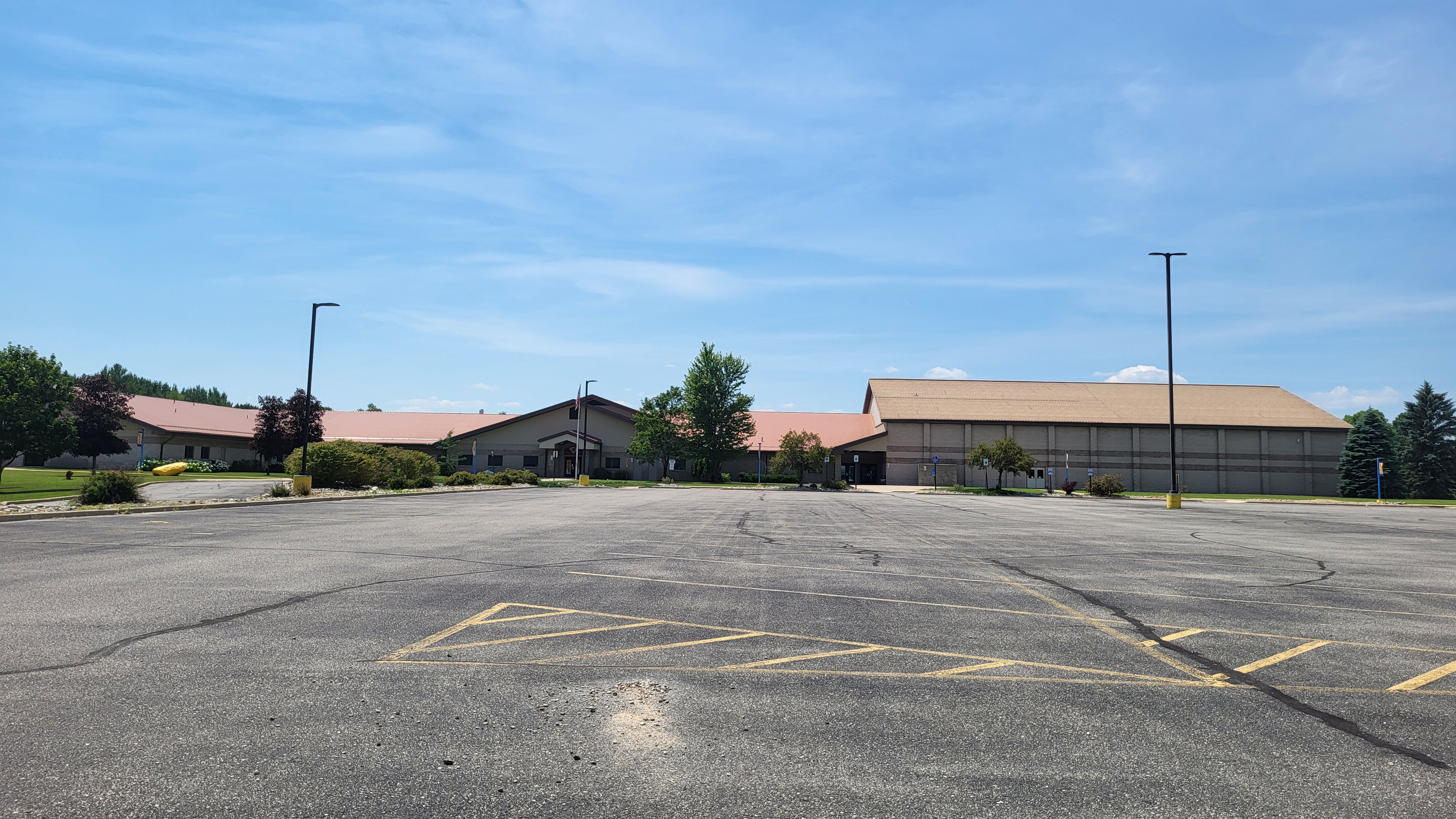
- Main entrance along 95th Avenue

Location
- 6221 95th Avenue; Evart, Michigan 49631; United States
- 43°54′12″N 85°16′48″W

Information
- Type: Public
- School district: Evart Public Schools
- Superintendent: Shirley Howard
- Principal: Jessica Kolenda
- Teaching staff: 18.03 (on a FTE basis)
- Grades: 9-12
- Enrollment: 257 (2024–2025)
- Student to teacher ratio: 14.25
- Colors: Blue; Gold
- Athletics conference: Highland Conference
- Mascot: Wildcats
- Website: evartps.org/schools/high-school/

Evart High School is a high school located in Evart, Michigan. The athletic teams are known as the Wildcats.
