= Osceola County, Michigan =

County in Michigan, United States

- County
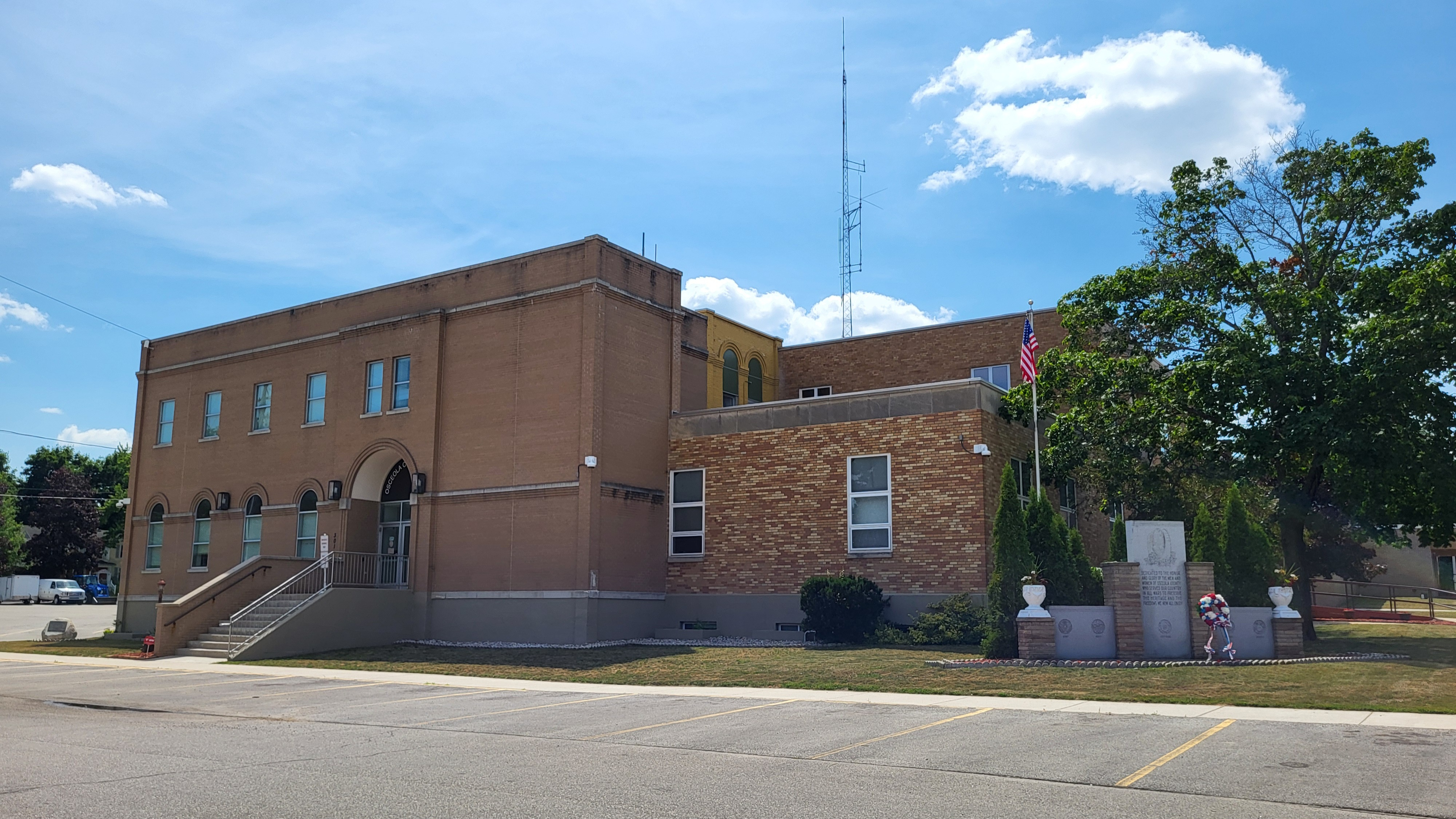
- Osceola County Building in Reed City

- Seal

- Location within the U.S. state of Michigan
- Coordinates: 43°59′N 85°20′W
- Country: United States
- State: Michigan
- Founded: April 1, 1840 (created); 1869 (organized)
- Named for: Osceola
- Seat: Reed City
- Largest city: Reed City

Area
  - Total: 573 sq mi (1,480 km^{2})
  - Land: 566.39 sq mi (1,466.9 km^{2})
  - Water: 6.7 sq mi (17 km^{2}) 1.2%

Population (2020)
  - Total: 22,891
  - Estimate (2025): 23,516 ▲
  - Density: 41.4/sq mi (16.0/km^{2})
- Time zone: UTC−5 (Eastern)
  - Summer (DST): UTC−4 (EDT)
- Congressional district: 2nd
- Website: www.osceola-county.org

Osceola County (/ˌɒsiˈoʊlə/ OSS-ee-OH-lə) is a county in the U.S. state of Michigan. As of the 2020 United States census, the population was 22,891. The county seat is Reed City.

== History ==
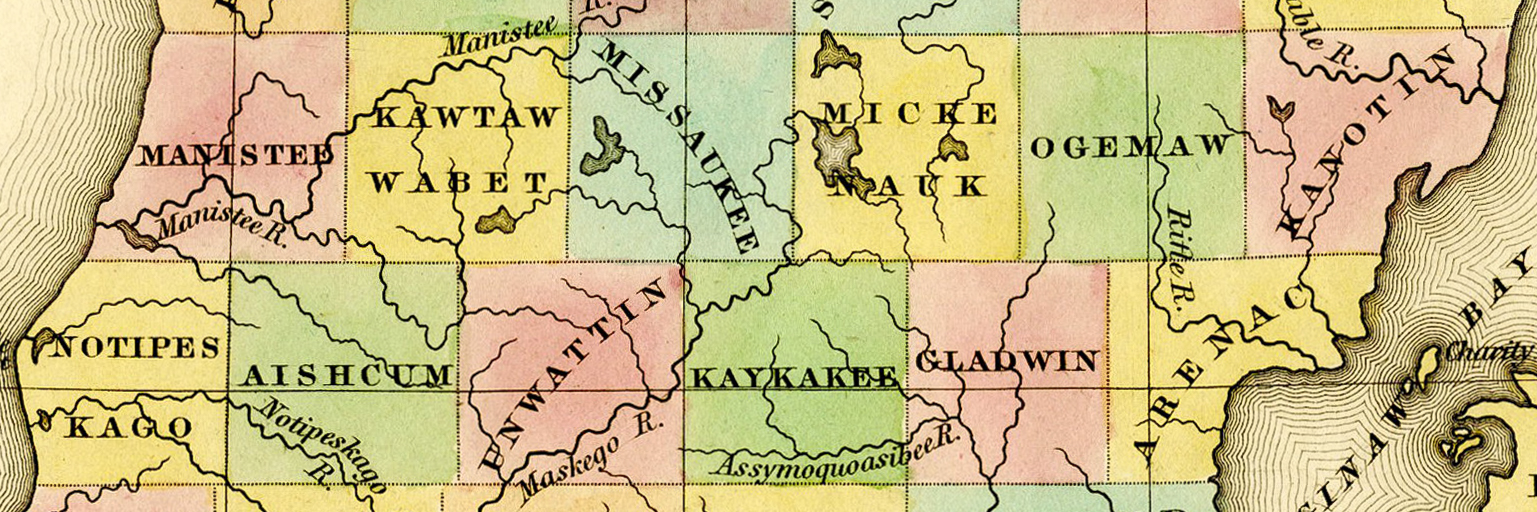
A detail from A New Map of Michigan with its Canals, Roads & Distances (1842) by Henry Schenck Tanner, showing Osceola County as Unwattin, the county's name from 1840 to 1843.

When established by the Michigan Legislature on April 1, 1840, it was named Unwattin County, after Chief Unwattin of the local Ottawa people. As a representative of the Ottawa nation, he participated in negotiations for the Treaty of Washington (1836) that granted a vast expanse of Michigan to the US Federal Government. The name was changed March 8, 1843, to Osceola, after the Seminole chief who achieved renown in Florida.

The county was initially attached for administrative purposes to Ottawa County. In 1855, it was attached to Mason County; in 1857, to Newaygo County; and in 1859, to Mecosta County.

As the population increased, separate county government was organized in 1869, with Hersey designated as the county seat. Reed City became the official county seat in 1927. The county was developed initially for harvesting and processing lumber, and many European Americans came to work in lumbering and the mills.

== Geography ==
The low rolling hills of Osceola County were completely wooded prior to settlement; at present about half of the area has been cleared and converted to agricultural or urban use. There are numerous small lakes and ponds scattered across the county; the largest is Rose Lake, northeast of LeRoy. The highest point on the terrain (1,722 feet/525 meters ASL) is Grove Hill, in Sherman Township. According to the United States Census Bureau, the county has a total area of 573 square miles (1,480 km^{2}), of which 566 square miles (1,470 km^{2}) is land and 6.7 square miles (17 km^{2}) (6.7%) is water. The county is drained by the Muskegon River and branches of the Manistee River. Osceola County is part of Northern Michigan.

=== Adjacent counties ===
- Wexford County − northwest
- Missaukee County − northeast
- Clare County − east
- Isabella County − southeast
- Mecosta County − south
- Newaygo County − southwest
- Lake County − west

=== Major highways ===
- US 10
- US 131
- Bus. US 10 in Reed City
- M-61
- M-66
- M-115

== Demographics ==
Historical population
Census	Pop.	Note	%±
1860	27		—
1870	2,093		7,651.9%
1880	10,777		414.9%
1890	14,630		35.8%
1900	17,859		22.1%
1910	17,889		0.2%
1920	15,221		−14.9%
1930	12,806		−15.9%
1940	13,309		3.9%
1950	13,797		3.7%
1960	13,595		−1.5%
1970	14,838		9.1%
1980	18,928		27.6%
1990	20,146		6.4%
2000	23,197		15.1%
2010	23,528		1.4%
2020	22,891		−2.7%
2025 (est.)	23,516	▲	2.7%
US Decennial Census; 1790-1960 1900-1990; 1990-2000 2010-2020

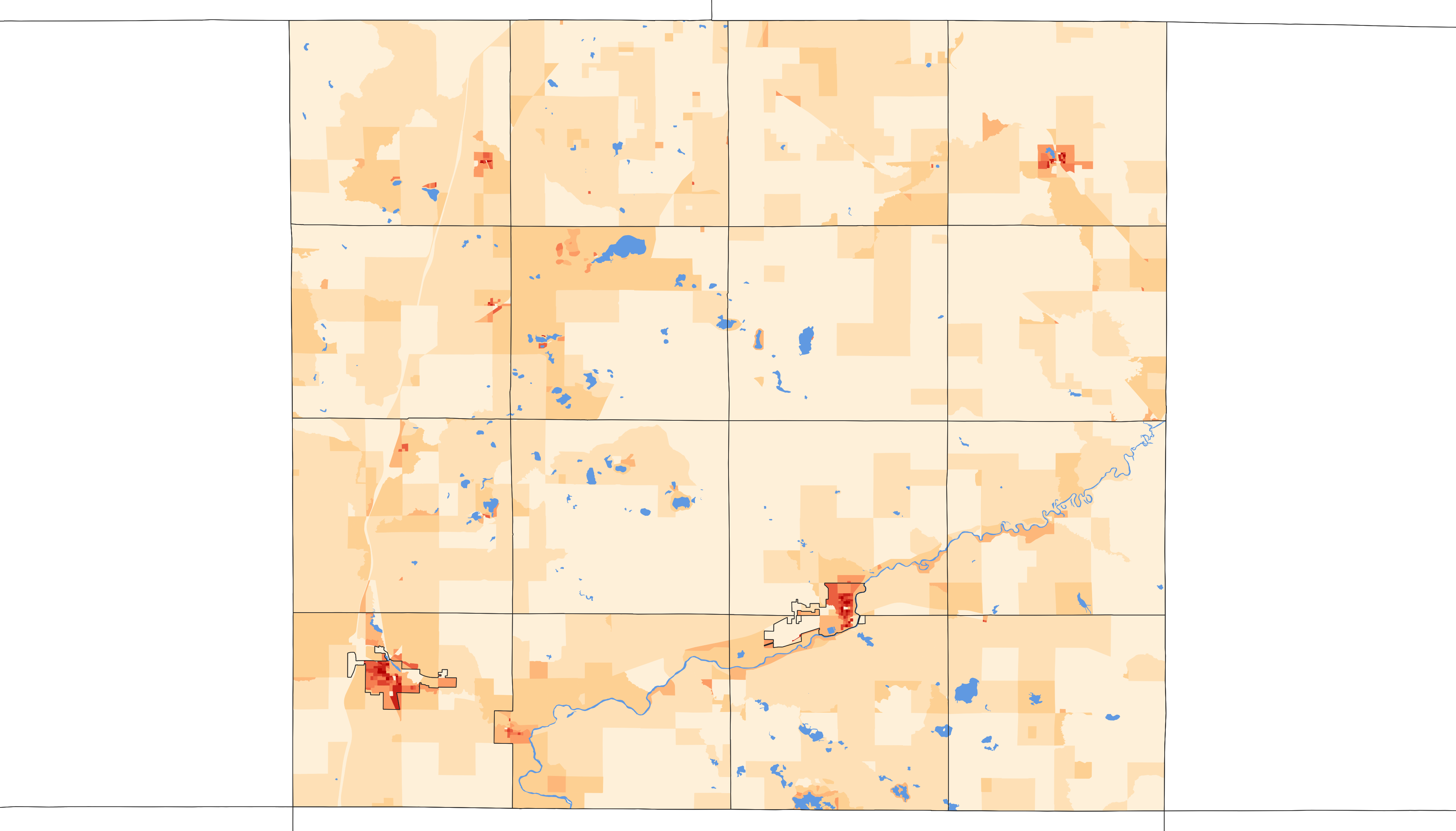
2020 population density of Osceola County MI by census block

=== Racial and etnic composition ===
Osceola County, Michigan – Racial and ethnic composition Note: the US Census treats Hispanic/Latino as an ethnic category. This table excludes Latinos from the racial categories and assigns them to a separate category. Hispanics/Latinos may be of any race.
Race / Ethnicity (NH = Non-Hispanic)	Pop 1980	Pop 1990	Pop 2000	Pop 2010	Pop 2020	% 1980	% 1990	% 2000	% 2010	% 2020
White alone (NH)	18,682	19,785	22,461	22,531	21,188	98.70%	98.21%	96.83%	95.76%	92.56%
Black or African American alone (NH)	17	54	79	125	155	0.09%	0.27%	0.34%	0.53%	0.68%
Native American or Alaska Native alone (NH)	77	116	111	119	142	0.41%	0.58%	0.48%	0.51%	0.62%
Asian alone (NH)	35	43	48	48	34	0.18%	0.21%	0.21%	0.20%	0.15%
Native Hawaiian or Pacific Islander alone (NH)	x	x	4	5	6	x	x	0.02%	0.02%	0.03%
Other race alone (NH)	11	5	5	5	61	0.06%	0.02%	0.02%	0.02%	0.27%
Mixed race or Multiracial (NH)	x	x	259	351	905	x	x	1.12%	1.49%	3.95%
Hispanic or Latino (any race)	106	143	230	344	400	0.56%	0.71%	0.99%	1.46%	1.75%
Total	18,928	20,146	23,197	23,528	22,891	100.00%	100.00%	100.00%	100.00%	100.00%

=== 2020 census ===
As of the 2020 census, the county had a population of 22,891. The median age was 43.6 years, 23.4% of residents were under the age of 18, and 21.2% were 65 years of age or older. For every 100 females there were 100.7 males, and for every 100 females age 18 and over there were 98.0 males age 18 and over.

The racial makeup of the county was 93.5% White, 0.7% Black or African American, 0.7% American Indian and Alaska Native, 0.1% Asian, <0.1% Native Hawaiian and Pacific Islander, 0.5% from some other race, and 4.4% from two or more races. Hispanic or Latino residents of any race comprised 1.7% of the population.

Less than 0.1% of residents lived in urban areas, while 100.0% lived in rural areas.

There were 9,152 households in the county, of which 27.5% had children under the age of 18 living in them. Of all households, 50.3% were married-couple households, 18.7% were households with a male householder and no spouse or partner present, and 23.4% were households with a female householder and no spouse or partner present. About 28.0% of all households were made up of individuals and 13.3% had someone living alone who was 65 years of age or older.

There were 12,534 housing units, of which 27.0% were vacant. Among occupied housing units, 80.1% were owner-occupied and 19.9% were renter-occupied. The homeowner vacancy rate was 1.6% and the rental vacancy rate was 7.4%.

=== 2000 census ===
At the 2000 United States census, there were 23,197 people, 8,861 households and 6,415 families in the county. The population density was 41 per square mile (16/km^{2}). There were 12,853 housing units at an average density of 23 per square mile (8.9/km^{2}). The racial makeup of the county was 97.51% White, 0.35% Black or African American, 0.50% Native American, 0.22% Asian, 0.02% Pacific Islander, 0.20% from other races, and 1.21% from two or more races. 0.99% of the population were Hispanic or Latino of any race. 26.0% were of German, 11.9% English, 11.0% American, 8.8% Irish, 6.5% Dutch and 5.2% Polish ancestry. 96.8% spoke English, 1.1% German and 1.0% Spanish as their first language.

There were 8,861 households, of which 32.90% had children under the age of 18 living with them, 58.10% were married couples living together, 9.70% had a female householder with no husband present, and 27.60% were non-families. 22.60% of all households were made up of individuals, and 9.80% had someone living alone who was 65 years of age or older. The average household size was 2.58 and the average family size was 3.01.

27.10% of the population were under the age of 18, 8.00% from 18 to 24, 26.50% from 25 to 44, 24.20% from 45 to 64, and 14.20% who were 65 years of age or older. The median age was 38 years. For every 100 females there were 97.70 males. For every 100 females age 18 and over, there were 94.70 males.

The median household income was $34,102 and the median family income was $39,205. Males had a median income of $29,837 compared with $22,278 for females. The per capita income for the county was $15,632. About 9.50% of families and 12.70% of the population were below the poverty line, including 15.90% of those under age 18 and 10.30% of those age 65 or over.

== Government ==
United States presidential election results for Osceola County, Michigan
Year	Republican		Democratic		Third party(ies)	
Year	No.	%	No.	%	No.	%
1884	1,497	58.43%	792	30.91%	273	10.66%
1888	1,882	57.01%	1,090	33.02%	329	9.97%
1892	1,601	51.13%	1,092	34.88%	438	13.99%
1896	2,268	62.90%	1,177	32.64%	161	4.46%
1900	2,635	71.08%	880	23.74%	192	5.18%
1904	2,936	80.24%	562	15.36%	161	4.40%
1908	2,718	74.38%	767	20.99%	169	4.63%
1912	1,306	37.03%	609	17.27%	1,612	45.70%
1916	2,193	61.90%	1,285	36.27%	65	1.83%
1920	3,603	80.84%	769	17.25%	85	1.91%
1924	3,050	77.79%	566	14.44%	305	7.78%
1928	3,923	86.66%	582	12.86%	22	0.49%
1932	2,969	55.18%	2,321	43.13%	91	1.69%
1936	3,107	56.29%	1,992	36.09%	421	7.63%
1940	4,217	72.85%	1,555	26.86%	17	0.29%
1944	3,787	73.14%	1,338	25.84%	53	1.02%
1948	3,122	68.54%	1,276	28.01%	157	3.45%
1952	4,607	78.86%	1,160	19.86%	75	1.28%
1956	4,549	78.28%	1,236	21.27%	26	0.45%
1960	4,477	76.33%	1,378	23.50%	10	0.17%
1964	2,779	48.84%	2,891	50.81%	20	0.35%
1968	3,705	63.77%	1,509	25.97%	596	10.26%
1972	4,441	69.95%	1,706	26.87%	202	3.18%
1976	4,467	62.23%	2,603	36.26%	108	1.50%
1980	4,902	60.04%	2,650	32.46%	612	7.50%
1984	5,923	73.21%	2,127	26.29%	40	0.49%
1988	5,218	64.25%	2,860	35.22%	43	0.53%
1992	3,606	38.46%	3,529	37.64%	2,241	23.90%
1996	3,855	42.41%	4,085	44.94%	1,150	12.65%
2000	5,680	57.20%	4,006	40.34%	244	2.46%
2004	6,599	58.98%	4,467	39.93%	122	1.09%
2008	5,973	54.17%	4,855	44.03%	198	1.80%
2012	6,141	59.75%	3,981	38.73%	156	1.52%
2016	7,336	69.15%	2,705	25.50%	568	5.35%
2020	8,928	72.35%	3,214	26.05%	198	1.60%
2024	9,639	73.11%	3,326	25.23%	219	1.66%

United States Senate election results for Osceola County, Michigan1
Year	Republican		Democratic		Third party(ies)	
Year	No.	%	No.	%	No.	%
2024	9,291	71.43%	3,281	25.22%	436	3.35%

Michigan Gubernatorial election results for Osceola County
Year	Republican		Democratic		Third party(ies)	
Year	No.	%	No.	%	No.	%
2022	6,954	67.00%	3,174	30.58%	251	2.42%

The county government operates the jail, maintains rural roads, operates the major local courts, keeps files of deeds and mortgages, maintains vital records, administers public health regulations, and participates with the state in the provision of welfare and other social services. The county board of commissioners controls the budget but has only limited authority to make laws or ordinances. In Michigan, most local government functions — police and fire, building and zoning, tax assessment, street maintenance, etc. — are the responsibility of individual cities and townships.

== Communities ==
U.S. Census data map showing local municipal boundaries within Osceola County. Shaded areas represent incorporated cities.

=== Cities ===
- Evart
- Reed City (county seat)

=== Villages ===
- Hersey
- LeRoy
- Marion
- Tustin

=== Civil townships ===
- Burdell Township
- Cedar Township
- Evart Township
- Hartwick Township
- Hersey Township
- Highland Township
- Le Roy Township
- Lincoln Township
- Marion Township
- Middle Branch Township
- Orient Township
- Osceola Township
- Richmond Township
- Rose Lake Township
- Sherman Township
- Sylvan Township

=== Unincorporated communities ===
- Ashton
- Avondale
- Chippewa
- Dighton
- Highland
- Ina
- Orono
- Park Lake
- Pisgah Heights
- Sears
- Slaybaugh Corner

== Education ==
=== Intermediate School District ===
The Mecosta–Osceola Intermediate School District, based in Big Rapids, services the majority of the students in the county (Evart and Reed City), while Wexford-Missaukee Intermediate School District covering services for the others (Marion and Pine River). The ISD offers regional special education services, a residential at-risk youth center, and technical career programs for students of its districts.

=== Public School Districts ===
Osceola County is served by the following regular public school districts:

- Evart Public Schools
- Marion Public Schools
- Pine River Area Schools
- Reed City Area Public Schools

=== Private Schools ===
Osceola County has the following private schools:

- Trinity Lutheran School (Lutheran)

== See also ==
- List of Michigan State Historic Sites in Osceola County, Michigan
- National Register of Historic Places listings in Osceola County, Michigan
