= Sylvan Township, Osceola County, Michigan =

Sylvan Township, Michigan
- Civil township
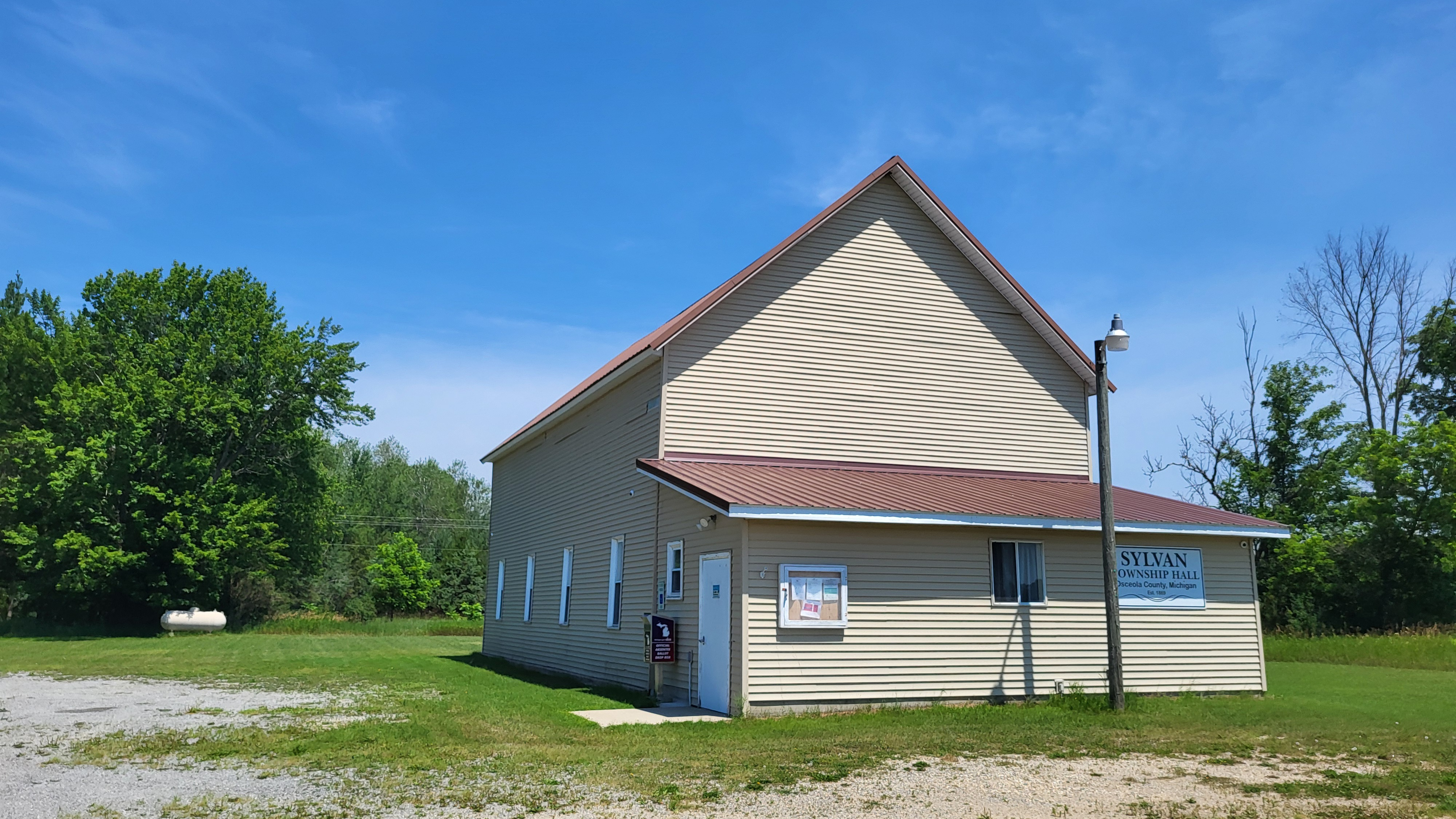
- Sylvan Township Hall

- Location within Osceola County

- Location within the state of Michigan Location within the United States
- Coordinates: 43°56′39″N 85°09′05″W
- Country: United States
- State: Michigan
- County: Osceola
- Established: 1869

Government
  - Supervisor: Angela Moore
  - Clerk: Terry Pritchard

Area
  - Total: 35.16 sq mi (91.06 km^{2})
  - Land: 34.56 sq mi (89.51 km^{2})
  - Water: 0.60 sq mi (1.55 km^{2})
- Elevation: 1,004 ft (306 m)

Population (2020)
  - Total: 967
  - Density: 28/sq mi (11/km^{2})
- Time zone: UTC-5 (Eastern (EST))
  - Summer (DST): UTC-4 (EDT)
- ZIP code(s): 49631 (Evart); 49665 (Marion); 49679 (Sears)
- Area code: 231
- FIPS code: 26-77760
- GNIS feature ID: 1627147
- Website: Official website

Sylvan Township is a civil township of Osceola County in the U.S. state of Michigan. The population was 967 at the 2020 census.

== Geography ==
According to the United States Census Bureau, the township has a total area of 35.2 square miles (91.2 km^{2}), of which 34.5 square miles (89.4 km^{2}) is land and 0.7 square mile (1.9 km^{2}) (2.10%) is water.

== Communities ==
- Earl was the name of a rural postoffice in this township from 1892 until 1894.

== Demographics ==
As of the census of 2000, there were 1,033 people, 393 households, and 284 families residing in the township. The population density was 29.9 inhabitants per square mile (11.5/km^{2}). There were 730 housing units at an average density of 21.2 per square mile (8.2/km^{2}). The racial makeup of the township was 95.93% White, 0.48% African American, 1.45% Native American, 0.10% from other races, and 2.03% from two or more races. Hispanic or Latino of any race were 0.68% of the population.

There were 393 households, out of which 30.3% had children under the age of 18 living with them, 57.8% were married couples living together, 8.7% had a female householder with no husband present, and 27.7% were non-families. 23.2% of all households were made up of individuals, and 10.9% had someone living alone who was 65 years of age or older. The average household size was 2.55 and the average family size was 2.99.

In the township the population was spread out, with 27.2% under the age of 18, 7.1% from 18 to 24, 26.1% from 25 to 44, 23.8% from 45 to 64, and 15.8% who were 65 years of age or older. The median age was 39 years. For every 100 females, there were 111.7 males. For every 100 females age 18 and over, there were 106.0 males.

The median income for a household in the township was $30,833, and the median income for a family was $32,981. Males had a median income of $29,886 versus $21,250 for females. The per capita income for the township was $15,285. About 10.8% of families and 12.4% of the population were below the poverty line, including 16.7% of those under age 18 and 8.7% of those age 65 or over.
