= Reed City, Michigan =

- City
- City of Reed City
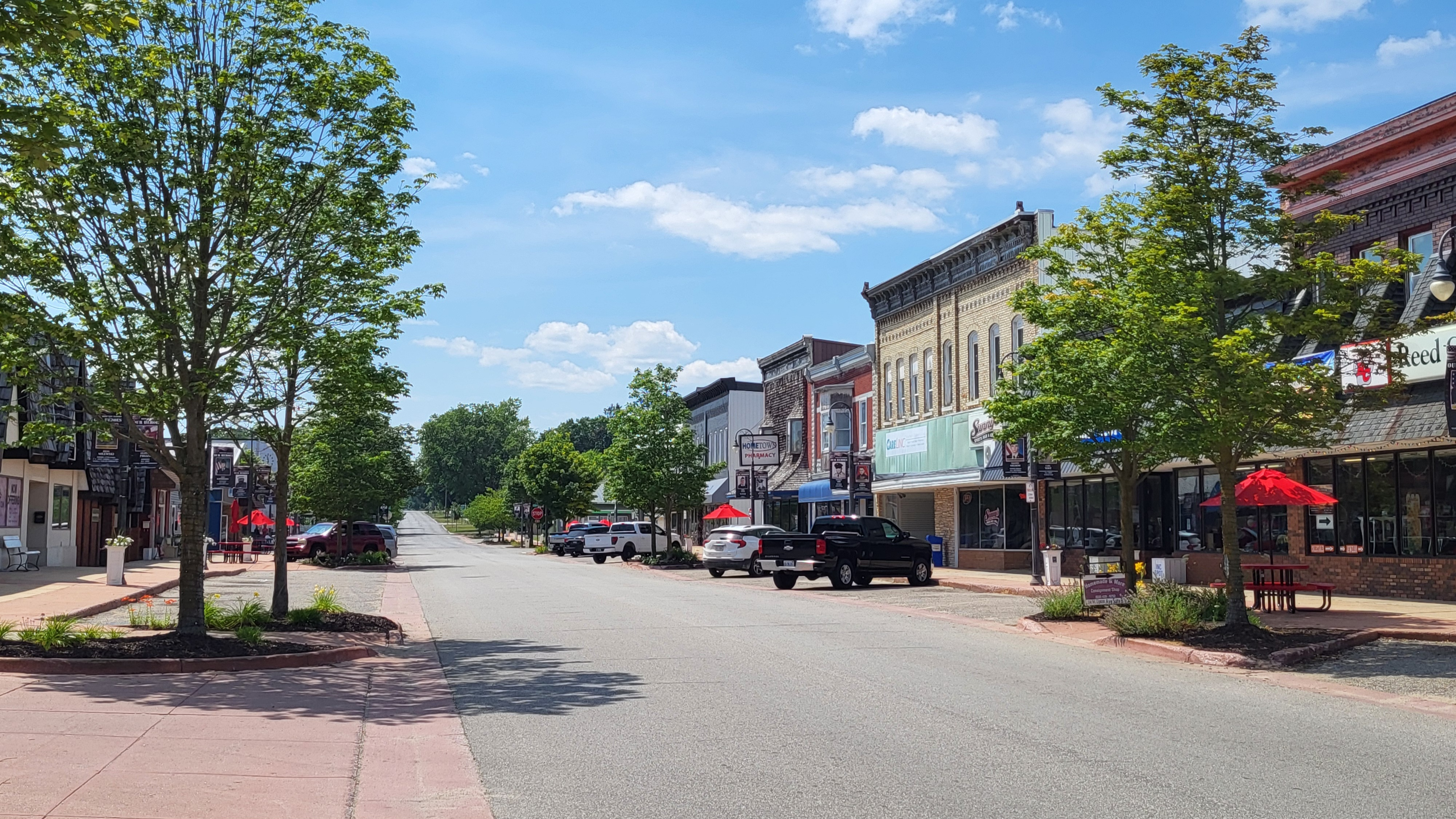
- Downtown along W. Upton Avenue
- Motto: Your Crossroads Community on the Path to Progress...
- Location within Osceola County

- Location within the state of Michigan Location within the United States
- Coordinates: 43°52′30″N 85°30′36″W
- Country: United States
- State: Michigan
- County: Osceola
- Settled: 1870
- Incorporated: 1872 (village); 1932 (city)

Government
  - Type: Mayor–council
  - Mayor: Roger Meinert
  - Manager: Rich Saladin
  - Clerk: Chastity Eads

Area
  - Total: 2.14 sq mi (5.53 km^{2})
  - Land: 2.10 sq mi (5.44 km^{2})
  - Water: 0.035 sq mi (0.09 km^{2})
- Elevation: 1,040 ft (317 m)

Population (2020)
  - Total: 2,490
  - Density: 1,185.71/sq mi (457.81/km^{2})
- Time zone: UTC-5 (Eastern (EST))
  - Summer (DST): UTC-4 (EDT)
- ZIP code(s): 49677
- Area code: 231
- FIPS code: 26-67820
- GNIS feature ID: 1621363
- Website: Official website

Reed City is a city in and county seat of Osceola County in the U.S. state of Michigan. The population was 2,490 at the 2020 census.

== Geography ==
According to the United States Census Bureau, the city has a total area of 2.11 square miles (5.46 km^{2}), of which 2.08 square miles (5.39 km^{2}) is land and 0.03 square miles (0.08 km^{2}) is water.

The Hersey River flows through Reed City.

== Demographics ==
Historical population
Census	Pop.	Note	%±
1880	1,091		—
1890	1,776		62.8%
1900	2,051		15.5%
1910	1,690		−17.6%
1920	1,803		6.7%
1930	1,792		−0.6%
1940	1,845		3.0%
1950	2,241		21.5%
1960	2,184		−2.5%
1970	2,286		4.7%
1980	2,221		−2.8%
1990	2,379		7.1%
2000	2,430		2.1%
2010	2,425		−0.2%
2020	2,490		2.7%
U.S. Decennial Census

=== 2020 census ===
As of the 2020 census, Reed City had a population of 2,490. The median age was 38.0 years. 26.1% of residents were under the age of 18 and 18.5% of residents were 65 years of age or older. For every 100 females there were 88.4 males, and for every 100 females age 18 and over there were 79.1 males age 18 and over.

0.0% of residents lived in urban areas, while 100.0% lived in rural areas.

There were 1,037 households in Reed City, of which 31.1% had children under the age of 18 living in them. Of all households, 32.8% were married-couple households, 20.0% were households with a male householder and no spouse or partner present, and 40.4% were households with a female householder and no spouse or partner present. About 39.0% of all households were made up of individuals and 16.1% had someone living alone who was 65 years of age or older.

There were 1,136 housing units, of which 8.7% were vacant. The homeowner vacancy rate was 1.8% and the rental vacancy rate was 7.3%.

Racial composition as of the 2020 census
Race	Number	Percent
White	2,244	90.1%
Black or African American	46	1.8%
American Indian and Alaska Native	9	0.4%
Asian	8	0.3%
Native Hawaiian and Other Pacific Islander	2	0.1%
Some other race	29	1.2%
Two or more races	152	6.1%
Hispanic or Latino (of any race)	51	2.0%

=== 2010 census ===
At the 2010 census, there were 2,425 people, 1,007 households, and 582 families living in the city. The population density was 1,165.9 per square mile (450.2/km^{2}). There were 1,136 housing units at an average density of 546.2 per square mile (210.9/km^{2}). The racial make-up of the city was 94.8% White, 1.7% African American, 0.5% Native American, 0.2% Asian, 0.3% from other races and 2.5% from two or more races. Hispanic or Latino of any race were 2.2% of the population.

There were 1,007 households, of which 33.3% had children under the age of 18 living with them, 35.3% were married couples living together, 16.8% had a female householder with no husband present, 5.8% had a male householder with no wife present, and 42.2% were non-families. 38.7% of all households were made up of individuals, and 15.6% had someone living alone who was 65 years of age or older. The average household size was 2.26 and the average family size was 2.98.

The median age was 36.1 years. 26.4% of residents were under the age of 18, 9.6% were between the ages of 18 and 24, 25.1% were from 25 to 44, 21.4% were from 45 to 64 and 17.5% were 65 years of age or older. The sex make-up of the city was 44.9% male and 55.1% female.

=== 2000 census ===
At the 2000 census, there were 2,430 people, 999 households and 609 families living in the city. The population density was 1,265.3 per square mile (488.5/km^{2}). There were 1,090 housing units at an average density of 567.5 per square mile (219.1/km^{2}). The racial make-up was 95.84% White, 1.07% African American, 0.74% Native American, 0.21% Asian, 0.12% from other races, and 2.02% from two or more races. Hispanic or Latino of any race were 0.91% of the population.

There were 999 households, of which 31.2% had children under the age of 18 living with them, 40.2% were married couples living together, 16.4% had a female householder with no husband present, and 39.0% were non-families. 33.4% of all households were made up of individuals, and 14.4% had someone living alone who was 65 years of age or older. The average household size was 2.30 and the average family size was 2.93.

25.6% of the population were under the age of 18, 11.4% from 18 to 24, 25.4% from 25 to 44, 19.8% from 45 to 64 and 17.7% were 65 years of age or older. The median age was 36 years. For every 100 females, there were 84.2 males. For every 100 females age 18 and over, there were 80.8 males.

The median household income was $30,756 and the median family income was $42,340. Males had a median income of $29,375 and females $25,263. The per capita income was $15,889. About 10.9% of families and 17.9% of the population were below the poverty line, including 16.6% of those under age 18 and 14.2% of those age 65 or over.

== Infrastructure ==
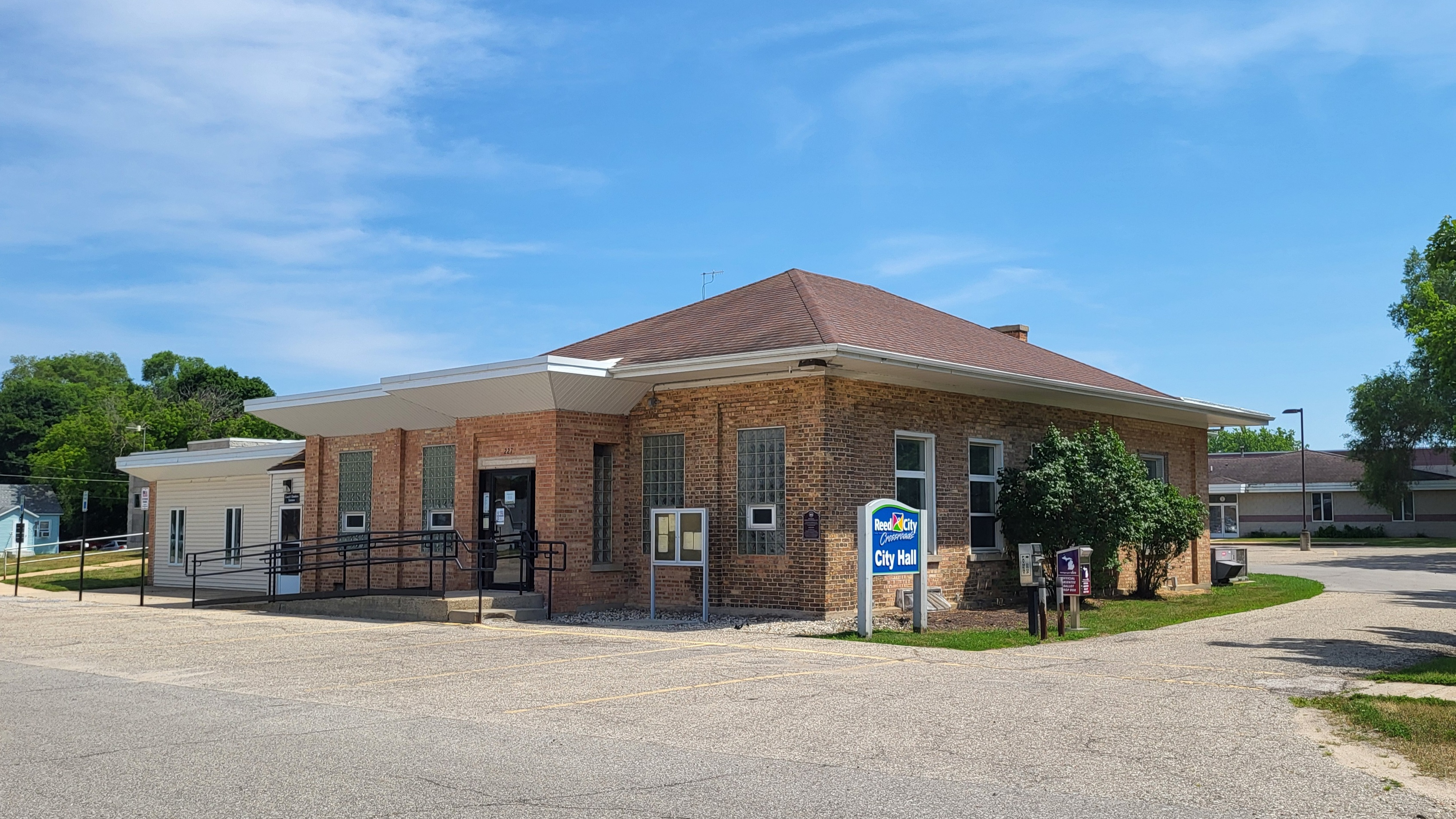
Reed City City Hall

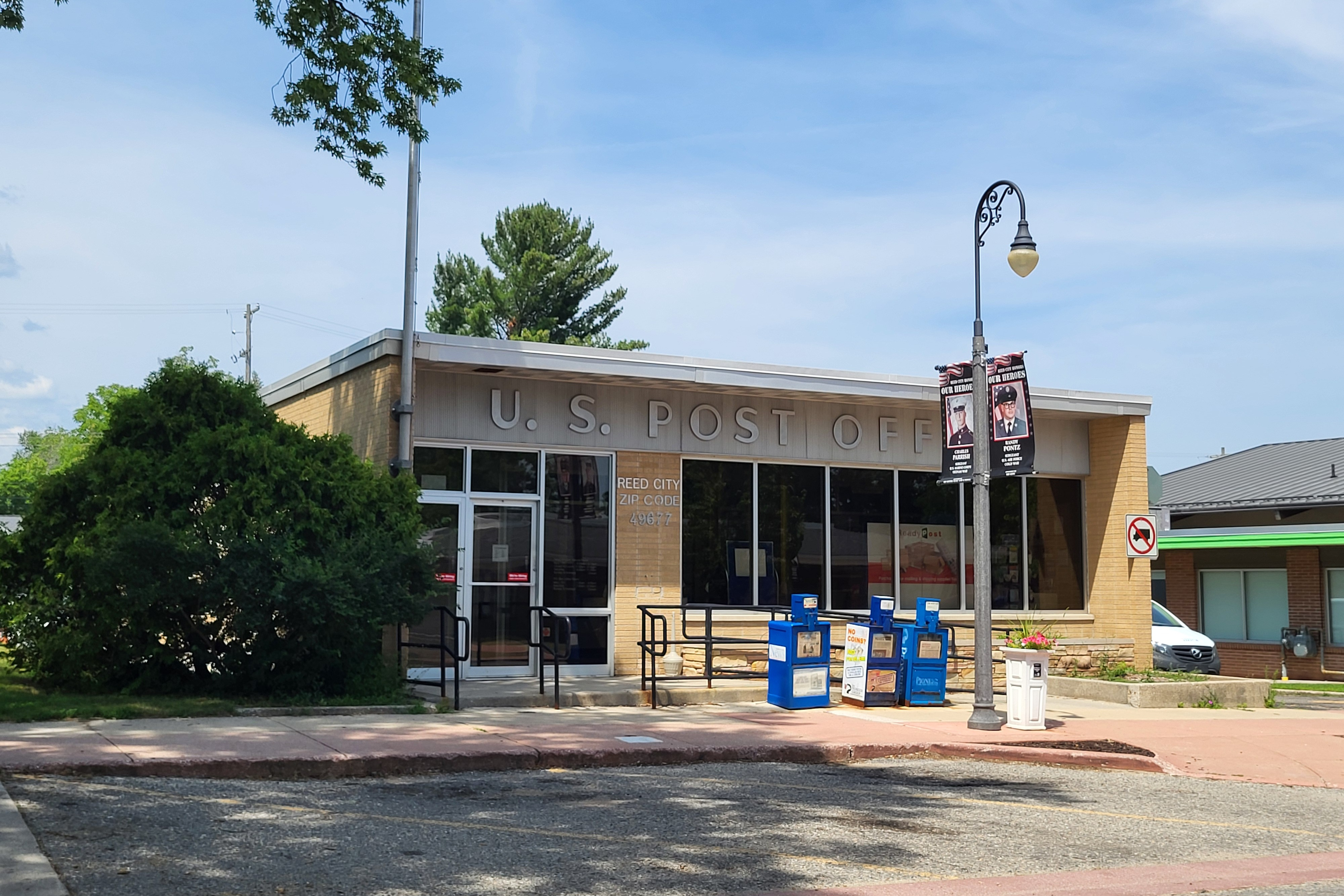
U.S. Post Office in Reed City

=== Transportation ===
The city is also at the crossroads of two US highways:

- US 10 is a highway that goes by Reed City. It has a business route that goes through the city.
- Bus. US 10 is the only highway that goes directly into Reed City. Most of the business of Reed City are along Bus. US 10.
- US 131 is a freeway that junctions US 10 near Reed City.

Indian Trails provides daily intercity bus service between Grand Rapids and Petoskey, Michigan.

Two of the state's premier rail trails intersect in the city:

- White Pine Trail
- Pere Marquette Trail

=== Historical transportation ===
The Pennsylvania Railroad ran trains from Grand Rapids to Cadillac, Petoskey and Mackinaw City on a route that includes land used now for the White Pine Trail, making stops in Reed City's union station. Immediate connections in Grand Rapids with sleepers to eastern Indiana and Cincinnati were part of the schedule. Reed City was the closest PRR station to Idlewild, a significant African-American resort until the 1960s. In the final years, service through the town was reduced to summer only. Passenger service ended between 1954 and 1955.

The Pere Marquette Railway ran trains west from Reed City to Ludington and east to Saginaw, on a route that is included in the above cited rail trail. At Saginaw the trains were timed to meet with separate Bay City-originating trains to Detroit. The PM's successor, the Chesapeake and Ohio Railway, ended the Ludington to Saginaw trains in the latter months of 1949.

== Notable people ==
- George Bennard (1873–1958), preacher and composer of the hymn "The Old Rugged Cross"
- Harold Cronk (born 1973), writer and director
- William C. Giese (1886–1966), Wisconsin state assemblyman
- Thomas D. Schall (1878–1935), U.S. Senator and U.S. Representative from Minnesota

== See also ==
- WDEE-FM
- Reed City Area Public Schools
