= Tustin, Michigan =

- Village
- Village of Tustin
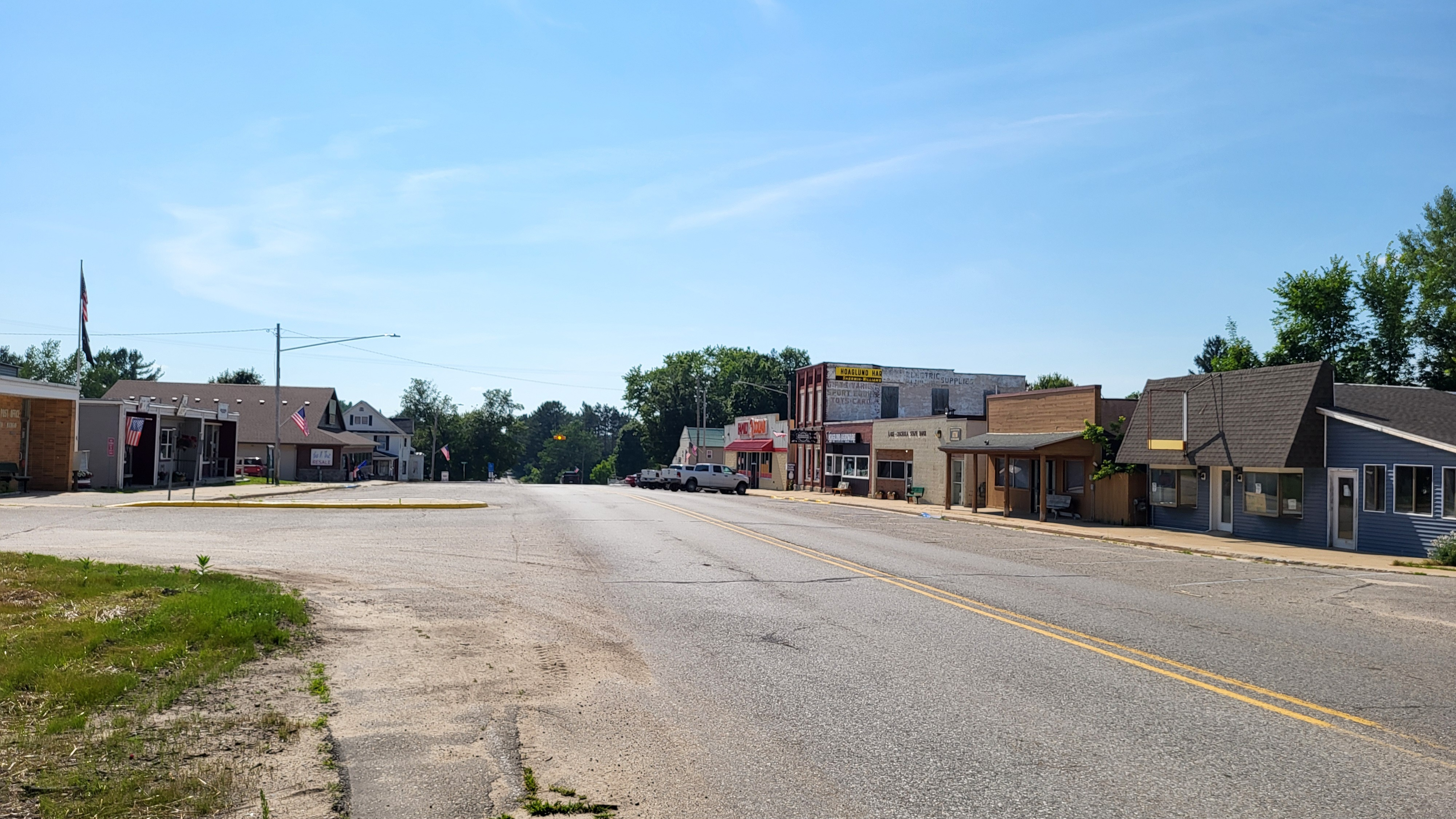
- Looking west along Church Street

- Location within Osceola County

- Location within the state of Michigan Location within the United States
- Coordinates: 44°06′08″N 85°27′28″W
- Country: United States
- State: Michigan
- County: Osceola
- Township: Burdell
- Settled: 1872
- Incorporated: 1893

Government
  - Type: Village council
  - President: Ryan Erickson
  - Clerk: Jessica Coykendall

Area
  - Total: 0.39 sq mi (1.00 km^{2})
  - Land: 0.39 sq mi (1.00 km^{2})
  - Water: 0 sq mi (0.00 km^{2})
- Elevation: 1,227 ft (374 m)

Population (2020)
  - Total: 270
  - Density: 692.31/sq mi (267.30/km^{2})
- Time zone: UTC-5 (Eastern (EST))
  - Summer (DST): UTC-4 (EDT)
- ZIP code(s): 49688
- Area code: 231
- FIPS code: 26-80960
- GNIS feature ID: 1615213

Tustin is a village in Osceola County in the U.S. state of Michigan. The population was 270 at the 2020 census. The village is located within Burdell Township.

== Geography ==
According to the United States Census Bureau, the village has a total area of 0.39 square miles (1.01 km^{2}), all land.

== Climate ==
This climatic region is typified by large seasonal temperature differences, with warm to hot (and often humid) summers and cold (sometimes severely cold) winters. According to the Köppen Climate Classification system, Tustin has a humid continental climate, abbreviated "Dfb" on climate maps.

== Demographics ==
Historical population
| Census | Pop. | Note | %± |
|---|---|---|---|
| 1900 | 303 | | — |
| 1910 | 371 | | 22.4% |
| 1920 | 281 | | −24.3% |
| 1930 | 253 | | −10.0% |
| 1940 | 232 | | −8.3% |
| 1950 | 229 | | −1.3% |
| 1960 | 248 | | 8.3% |
| 1970 | 230 | | −7.3% |
| 1980 | 264 | | 14.8% |
| 1990 | 236 | | −10.6% |
| 2000 | 237 | | 0.4% |
| 2010 | 230 | | −3.0% |
| 2020 | 270 | | 17.4% |
U.S. Decennial Census

=== 2010 census ===
As of the census of 2010, there were 230 people, 90 households, and 59 families living in the village. The population density was 589.7 inhabitants per square mile (227.7/km^{2}). There were 96 housing units at an average density of 246.2 per square mile (95.1/km^{2}). The racial makeup of the village was 95.2% White, 0.4% African American, 1.3% Asian, 0.4% from other races, and 2.6% from two or more races. Hispanic or Latino of any race were 1.3% of the population.

There were 90 households, of which 32.2% had children under the age of 18 living with them, 43.3% were married couples living together, 14.4% had a female householder with no husband present, 7.8% had a male householder with no wife present, and 34.4% were non-families. 23.3% of all households were made up of individuals, and 13.3% had someone living alone who was 65 years of age or older. The average household size was 2.56 and the average family size was 2.88.

The median age in the village was 37 years. 23.9% of residents were under the age of 18; 10.8% were between the ages of 18 and 24; 22.6% were from 25 to 44; 30% were from 45 to 64; and 12.6% were 65 years of age or older. The gender makeup of the village was 50.4% male and 49.6% female.

=== 2000 census ===
As of the census of 2000, there were 237 people, 88 households, and 63 families living in the village. The population density was 613.4 inhabitants per square mile (236.8/km^{2}). There were 92 housing units at an average density of 238.1 per square mile (91.9/km^{2}). The racial makeup of the village was 98.73% White and 1.27% Asian.

There were 88 households, out of which 35.2% had children under the age of 18 living with them, 47.7% were married couples living together, 19.3% had a female householder with no husband present, and 27.3% were non-families. 21.6% of all households were made up of individuals, and 13.6% had someone living alone who was 65 years of age or older. The average household size was 2.69 and the average family size was 3.13.

In the village, the population was spread out, with 29.1% under the age of 18, 10.5% from 18 to 24, 23.2% from 25 to 44, 22.4% from 45 to 64, and 14.8% who were 65 years of age or older. The median age was 36 years. For every 100 females, there were 88.1 males. For every 100 females age 18 and over, there were 78.7 males.

The median income for a household in the village was $29,063, and the median income for a family was $36,250. Males had a median income of $25,417 versus $15,000 for females. The per capita income for the village was $11,390. About 12.0% of families and 18.6% of the population were below the poverty line, including 14.9% of those under the age of 18 and 15.6% of those 65 or over.

== Images ==
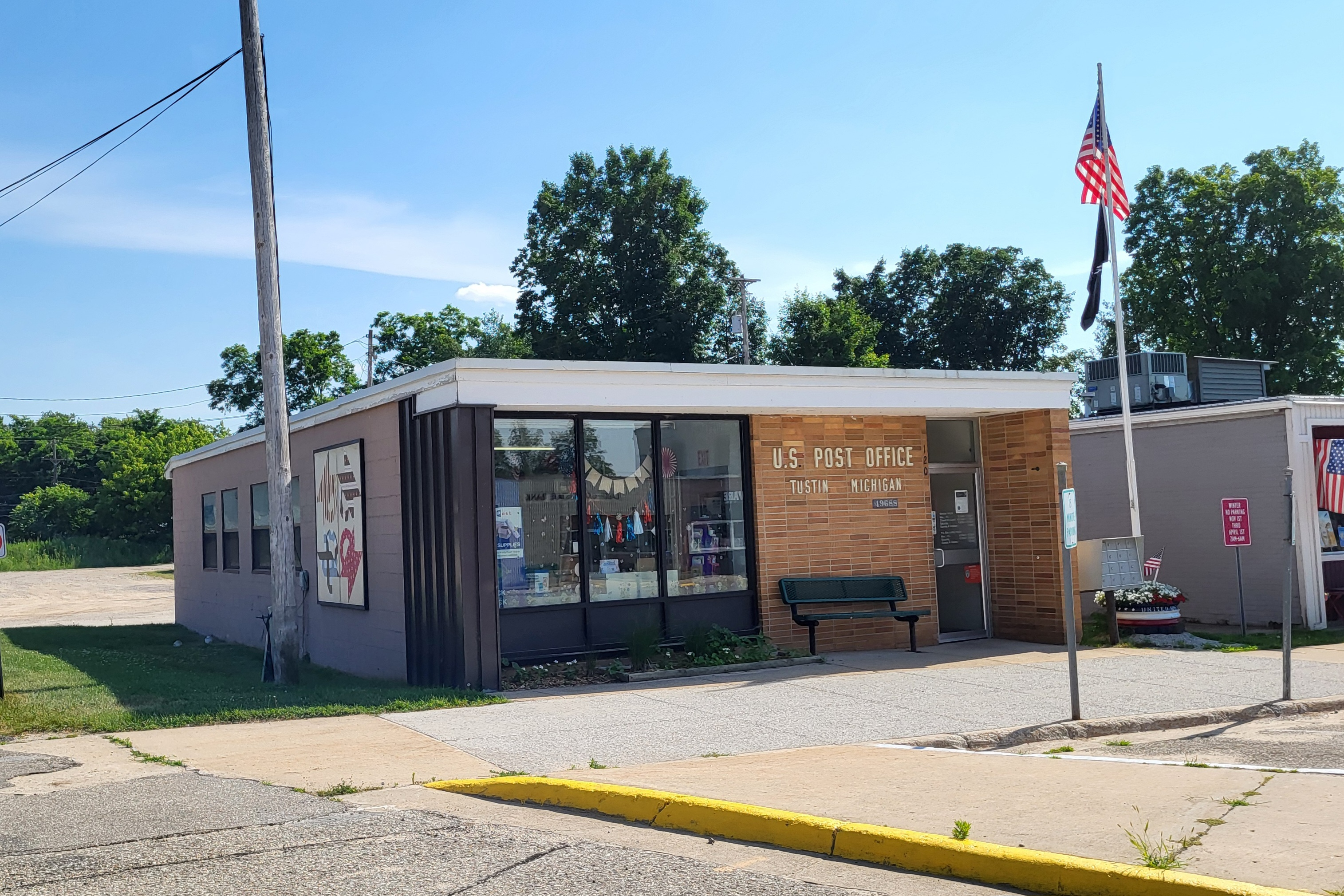
U.S. Post Office in Tustin

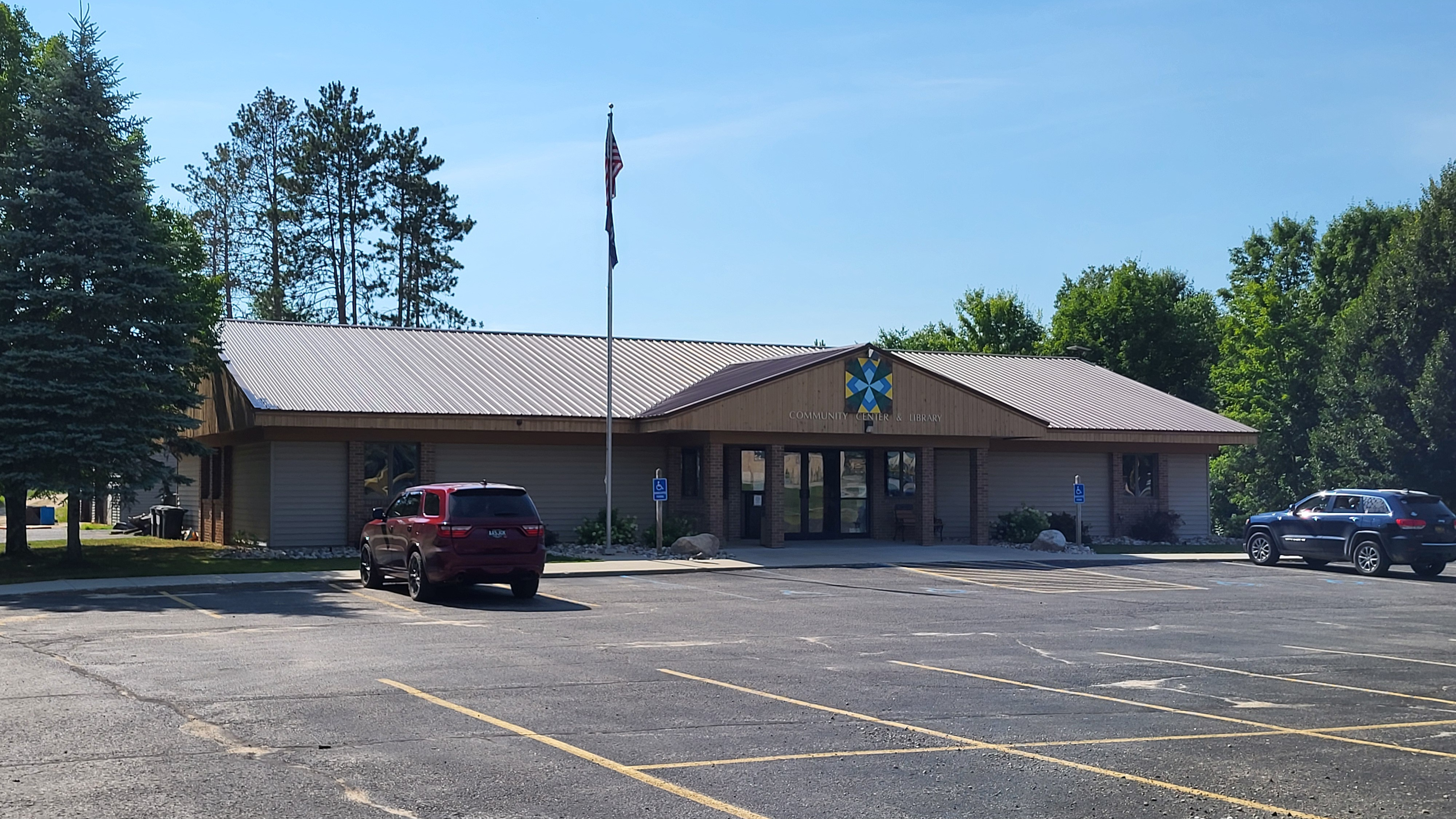
Community center and library

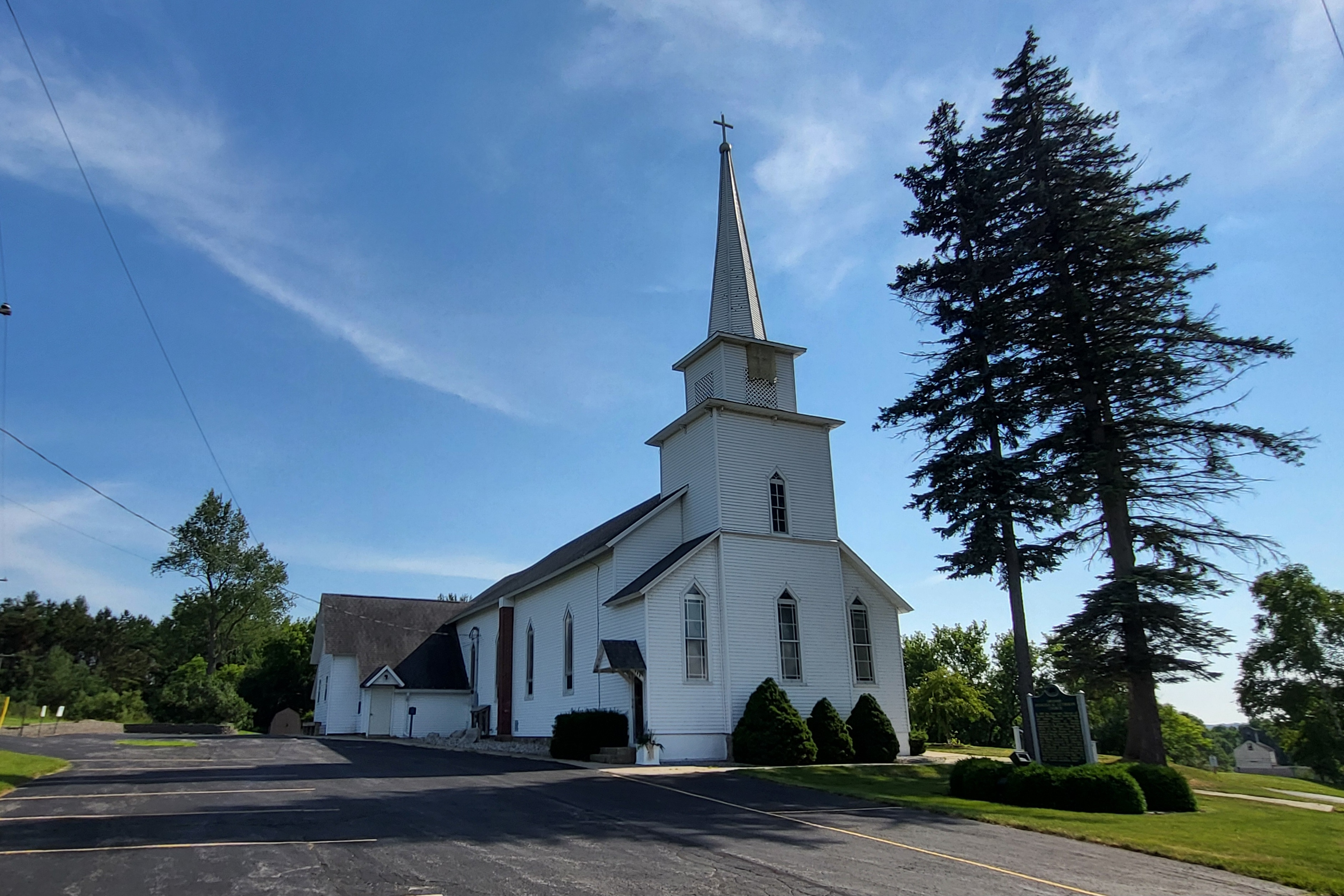
Swedish Evangelical Lutheran Church
