= Blodgett =

Blodgett can refer to:

== People ==
- Blodgett (surname)

== Places ==
In the United States:

- Blodgett, Missouri
- Blodgett, Oregon
- Blodgett Canyon in southwestern Montana
- Blodgett Landing, New Hampshire, a census-designated area

== Structures ==
In the United States:

- Delos A. Blodgett House, Daytona Beach, Florida, built in 1896
- Bacon-Gleason-Blodgett Homestead, Bedford, Massachusetts, built in 1740
- William Blodgett House, Newton, Massachusetts, built in 1875
- Lydia Blodgett Three-Decker, Worcester, Massachusetts, built in 1902
- Blodgett Hospital in western Michigan, part of the Spectrum Health group
- Roscommon County–Blodgett Memorial Airport, a public airport in Michigan
