= Lumber =

Wood that has been processed into beams and planks

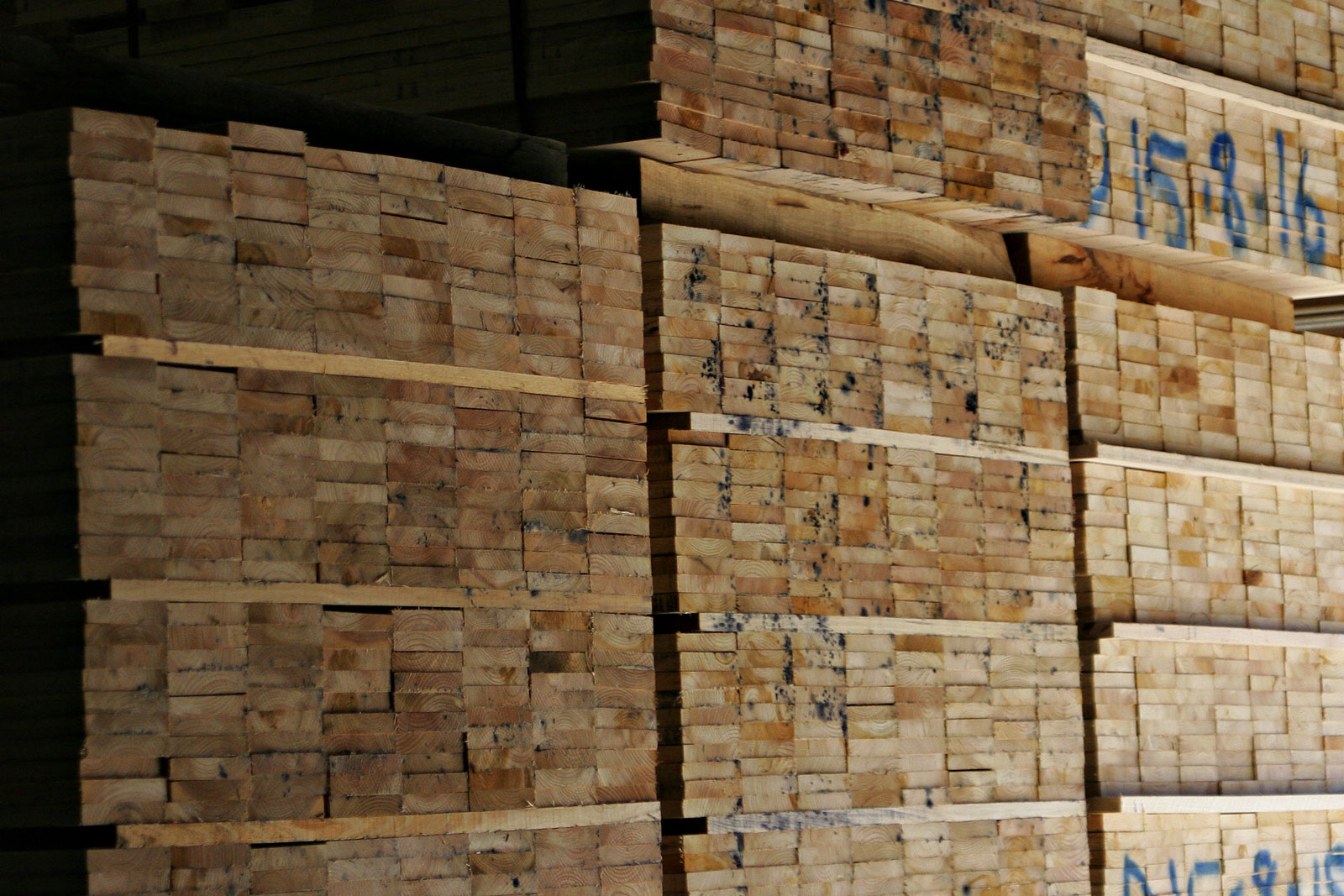
Wood cut from Victorian Eucalyptus regnans

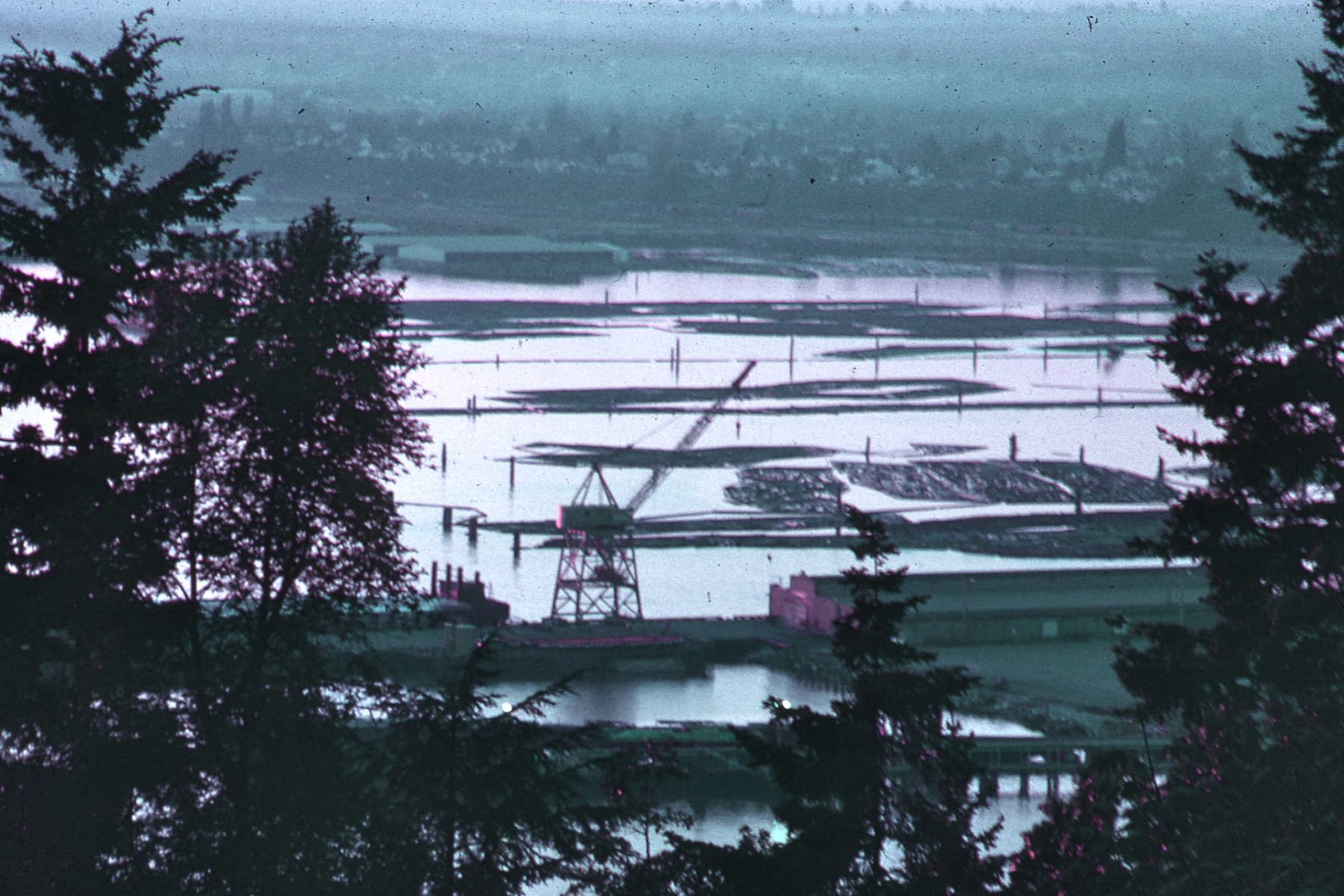
The harbor of Bellingham, Washington, United States, filled with logs, 1972

Lumber, also called timber or fine wood in British, Australian and New Zealand English is wood that has been processed into uniform and useful sizes (dimensional lumber), including beams and planks or boards. Lumber is mainly used for construction framing, as well as finishing (floors, wall panels, window frames). Lumber has many uses beyond home building. In some parts of the world, including the United States and Canada, the term timber refers specifically to unprocessed wood fiber, such as cut logs or standing trees that have yet to be cut.

Lumber may be supplied either rough-sawn, or surfaced on one or more of its faces. Rough lumber is the raw material for furniture-making, and manufacture of other items requiring cutting and shaping. It is available in many species, including hardwoods and softwoods, such as white pine and red pine, because of their low cost.

Finished lumber is supplied in standard sizes, mostly for the construction industry – primarily softwood, from coniferous species, including pine, fir and spruce (collectively spruce-pine-fir), cedar, and hemlock, but also some hardwood, for high-grade flooring. It is more commonly made from softwood than hardwoods, and 80% of lumber comes from softwood.

== Terminology ==
In the United States and Canada, milled boards are called lumber, while timber describes standing or felled trees.

In contrast, in Britain, and some other Commonwealth nations and Ireland, the term timber is used in both senses. (In the UK, the word lumber is rarely used in relation to wood and has several other meanings.)

=== Re-manufactured lumber ===
Re-manufactured lumber is the result of secondary or tertiary processing of previously milled lumber. Specifically, it refers to lumber cut for industrial or wood-packaging use. Lumber is cut by ripsaw or resaw to create dimensions that are not usually processed by a primary sawmill.

Re-sawing is the splitting of 1-to-12-inch (25–305 mm) hardwood or softwood lumber into two or more thinner pieces of full-length boards. For example, splitting a 10-foot-long (3.0 m) 2×4 (1 1/2 by 3 1/2 in or 38 by 89 mm) into two 2×2s (1 1/2 by 1 1/2 in or 38 by 38 mm) of the same length is considered re-sawing.

=== Plastic lumber ===
Structural lumber may also be produced from recycled plastic and new plastic stock. Its introduction has been strongly opposed by the forestry industry. Blending fiberglass in plastic lumber enhances its strength, durability, and fire resistance. Plastic fiberglass structural lumber can have a "class 1 flame spread rating of 25 or less, when tested in accordance with ASTM standard E 84," which means it burns more slowly than almost all treated wood lumber.

=== Timber mark ===
A timber mark is a code beaten on to cut wood by a specially made hammer to show the logging licence.

== History ==
The definition of the word lumber as sawn planks of wood originated in the 17th century in North America.

In 1420, the archipelago of Madeira was colonized by the Portuguese Empire. Prince Henry the Navigator sent settlers to Madeira, who cleared the huge expanses of forest to grow crops. The felled trees were processed at sawmills and shipped to the mainland.

Cornelis Corneliszoon (or Krelis Lootjes) was a Dutch windmill owner from Uitgeest who invented the first wind-powered sawmill in 1593. This made the conversion of logs into planks thirty times faster than previous manually operated sawmills.

== Conversion of wood logs ==
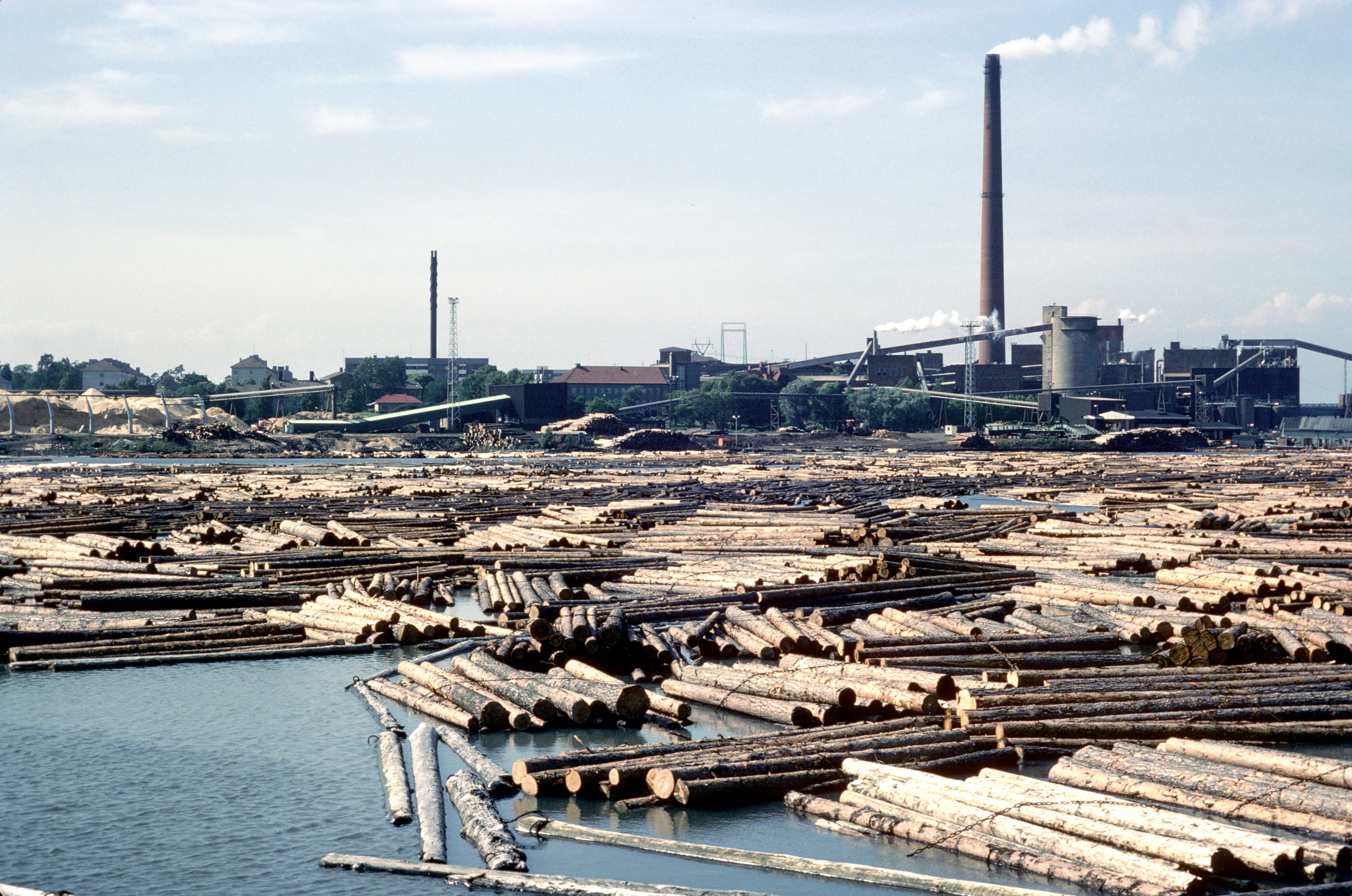
A sawmill with the floating logs in Kotka, Finland

Logs are converted into lumber by being sawn, hewn, or split. Sawing with a rip saw is the most common method, because sawing allows logs of lower quality, with irregular grain and large knots, to be used and is more economical. There are various types of sawing:

- Plain sawn (flat sawn, through and through, bastard sawn) – A log sawn through without adjusting the position of the log and the grain runs across the width of the boards.
- Quarter sawn and rift sawn – These terms have been confused in history but generally mean lumber sawn so the annual rings are reasonably perpendicular to the sides (not edges) of the lumber.
- Boxed heart – The pith remains within the timber, post or beam, with some allowance for exposure.
- Heart center – the center core of a log.
- Free of heart center (FOHC) – A side-cut timber, post or beam without any pith.
- Free of knots (FOK) – No knots are present.

== Dimensional lumber ==
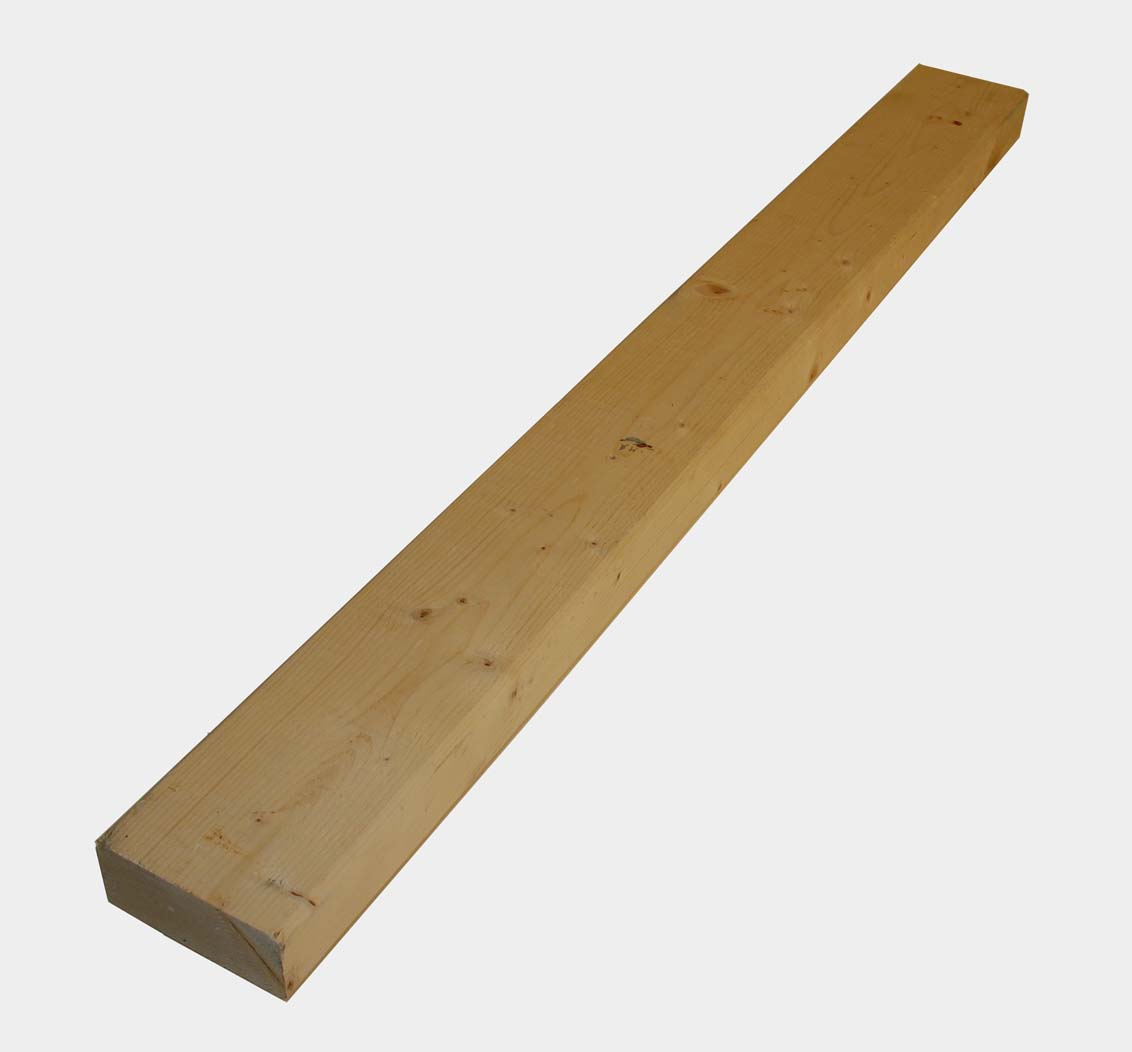
A common 50 by 100 mm (2-by-4-inch) board

Dimensional lumber is lumber that is cut to standardized width and depth, often specified in millimetres or inches (but see below for information on nominal dimensions vs. actual dimensions). Carpenters extensively use dimensional lumber in framing wooden buildings. Common sizes include 2×4 (pictured) (also two-by-four and other variants, such as four-by-two in Australia, New Zealand, and the UK), 2×6, and 4×4. The length of a board is usually specified separately from the width and depth. It is thus possible to find 2×4s that are four, eight, and twelve feet in length. In Canada and the United States, the standard lengths of lumber are 6, 8, 10, 12, 14, 16, 18, 20, 22 and 24 feet (1.8, 2.4, 3.0, 3.7, 4.3, 4.9, 5.5, 6.1, 6.7 and 7.3 m). For wall framing, precut "stud" lengths are available, and are commonly used. For ceilings heights of 8, 9 or 10 feet (2.4, 2.7 or 3.0 m), studs are available in 92 5/8 inches (2.35 m), 104 5/8 inches (2.66 m), and 116 5/8 inches (2.96 m).

=== North American softwoods ===
The length of a unit of dimensional lumber is limited by the height and girth of the tree it is milled from. In general the maximum length is 24 ft (7.32 m). Engineered wood products, manufactured by binding the strands, particles, fibers, or veneers of wood, together with adhesives, to form composite materials, offer more flexibility and greater structural strength than typical wood building materials.

Pre-cut studs save a framer much time, because they are pre-cut by the manufacturer for use in 8-, 9-, and 10-foot ceiling applications, which means the manufacturer has removed a few inches or centimetres of the piece to allow for the sill plate and the double top plate with no additional sizing necessary.

In the Americas, two-bys (2×4s, 2×6s, 2×8s, 2×10s, and 2×12s), named for traditional board thickness in inches, along with the 4×4 (89 mm × 89 mm), are common lumber sizes used in modern construction. They are the basic building blocks for such common structures as balloon-frame or platform-frame housing. Dimensional lumber made from softwood is typically used for construction, while hardwood boards are more commonly used for making cabinets or furniture.

Lumber's nominal dimensions are larger than the actual standard dimensions of finished lumber. Historically, the nominal dimensions were the size of the green (not dried), rough (unfinished) boards that eventually became smaller finished lumber through drying and planing (to smooth the wood). Today, the standards specify the final finished dimensions and the mill cuts the logs to whatever size it needs to achieve those final dimensions. Typically, that rough cut is smaller than the nominal dimensions because modern technology makes it possible to use the logs more efficiently. For example, a "2×4" board historically started out as a green, rough board actually 2 by 4 inches (51 mm × 102 mm). After drying and planing, it would be smaller by a nonstandard amount. Today, a "2×4" board starts out as something smaller than 2 inches by 4 inches and not specified by standards, and after drying and planing is minimally 1 1/2 by 3 1/2 inches (38 mm × 89 mm).

North American softwood dimensional lumber sizes
Nominal	Actual		Nominal	Actual		Nominal	Actual		Nominal	Actual		Nominal	Actual	
inches	inches	mm	inches	inches	mm	inches	inches	mm	inches	inches	mm	inches	inches	mm
1 × 2	3/4 × 1 1/2	19 × 38	2 × 2	1 1/2 × 1 1/2	38 × 38									
1 × 3	3/4 × 2 1/2	19 × 64	2 × 3	1 1/2 × 2 1/2	38 × 64									
1 × 4	3/4 × 3 1/2	19 × 89	2 × 4	1 1/2 × 3 1/2	38 × 89	4 × 4	3 1/2 × 3 1/2	89 × 89						
1 × 5	3/4 × 4 1/2	19 × 114												
1 × 6	3/4 × 5 1/2	19 × 140	2 × 6	1 1/2 × 5 1/2	38 × 140	4 × 6	3 1/2 × 5 1/2	89 × 140	6 × 6	5 1/2 × 5 1/2	140 × 140			
1 × 8	3/4 × 7 1/4	19 × 184	2 × 8	1 1/2 × 7 1/4	38 × 184	4 × 8	3 1/2 × 7 1/4	89 × 184				8 × 8	7 1/2 × 7 1/2	191 × 191
1 × 10	3/4 × 9 1/4	19 × 235	2 × 10	1 1/2 × 9 1/4	38 × 235									
1 × 12	3/4 × 11 1/4	19 × 286	2 × 12	1 1/2 × 11 1/4	38 × 286									

As previously noted, less wood is needed to produce a given finished size than when standards called for the green lumber to be the full nominal dimension. However, even the dimensions for finished lumber of a given nominal size have changed over time. In 1910, a typical finished 1-inch (25 mm) board was 13/16 in (21 mm). In 1928, that was reduced by 4%, and yet again by 4% in 1956. In 1961, the Committee on Grade Simplification and Standardization agreed to what is now the current U.S. standard: in part, the dressed size of a 1-inch (nominal) board was fixed at 3/4 inch; while the dressed size of 2 inch (nominal) lumber was reduced from 1 5/8 inch to the current 1 1/2 inch.

In 1964, Popular Mechanics magazine hired an independent agency to test the comparative strength of multiple samples of (A) a full-size 2×4 inches, (B) 1 5/8×3 5/8 inches, (C) 1 5/8×3 1/2 inches, and (D) 1 1/2×3 1/2 inches (today’s standard). With A’s compressive strength benchmarked as "100%," B-C-D were 90.7%, 82.2%, and 73.6% the strength of A’s full-size 2×4. Stated another way, the 1960s’ reduction of the smaller dimension from 1 5/8 to 1 1/2 inches reduced compressive strength by 10.46%.

Dimensional lumber is available in green, unfinished state, and for that kind of lumber, the nominal dimensions are the actual dimensions.

=== Grades and standards ===
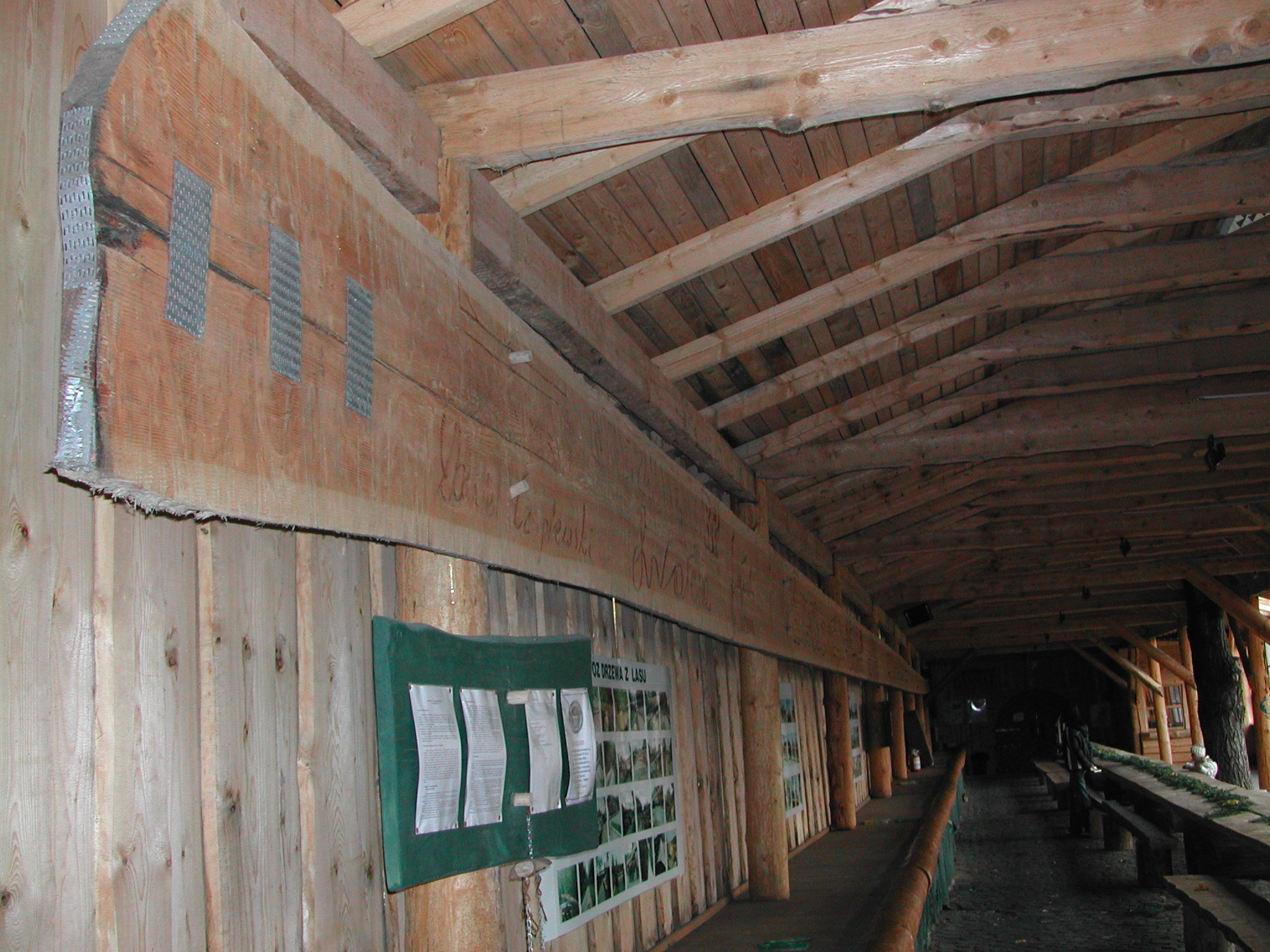
The longest plank in the world (2002) is in Poland (near Szymbark) and measures 36.83 meters (120 ft 10 in) long.

Individual pieces of lumber exhibit a wide range in quality and appearance with respect to knots, slope of grain, shakes and other natural characteristics. Therefore, they vary considerably in strength, utility, and value.

The move to set national standards for lumber in the United States began with the publication of the American Lumber Standard in 1924, which set specifications for lumber dimensions, grade, and moisture content; it also developed inspection and accreditation programs. These standards have changed over the years to meet the changing needs of manufacturers and distributors, with the goal of keeping lumber competitive with other construction products. Current standards are set by the American Lumber Standard Committee, appointed by the U.S. Secretary of Commerce.

Design values for most species and grades of visually graded structural products are determined in accordance with ASTM standards, which consider the effect of strength reducing characteristics, load duration, safety, and other influencing factors. The applicable standards are based on results of tests conducted in cooperation with the USDA Forest Products Laboratory. Design Values for Wood Construction, which is a supplement to the ANSI/AF&PA National Design Specification for Wood Construction, provides these lumber design values, which are recognized by the model building codes.

Canada has grading rules that maintain a standard among mills manufacturing similar woods to assure customers of uniform quality. Grades standardize the quality of lumber at different levels and are based on moisture content, size, and manufacture at the time of grading, shipping, and unloading by the buyer. The National Lumber Grades Authority (NLGA) is responsible for writing, interpreting and maintaining Canadian lumber grading rules and standards. The Canadian Lumber Standards Accreditation Board (CLSAB) monitors the quality of Canada's lumber grading and identification system. Their common grade abbrievation, CLS, Canadian Lumber Standard is well utilised in the construction industry.

Attempts to maintain lumber quality over time have been challenged by historical changes in the timber resources of the United States – from the slow-growing virgin forests common over a century ago to the fast-growing plantations now common in today's commercial forests. Resulting declines in lumber quality have been of concern to both the lumber industry and consumers and have caused increased use of alternative construction products.

Machine stress-rated and machine-evaluated lumber are readily available for end-uses where high strength is critical, such as trusses, rafters, laminating stock, I-beams and web joints. Machine grading measures a characteristic such as stiffness or density that correlates with the structural properties of interest, such as bending strength. The result is a more precise understanding of the strength of each piece of lumber than is possible with visually graded lumber, which allows designers to use full-design strength and avoid overbuilding.

In Europe, strength grading of rectangular sawn lumber/timber (both softwood and hardwood) is done according to EN-14081 and commonly sorted into classes defined by EN-338. For softwoods, the common classes are (in increasing strength) C16, C18, C24, and C30. There are also classes specifically for hardwoods and those in most common use (in increasing strength) are D24, D30, D40, D50, D60, and D70. For these classes, the number refers to the required 5th percentile bending strength in newtons per square millimetre. There are other strength classes, including T-classes based on tension intended for use in glulam.

- C14, used for scaffolding and formwork
- C16 and C24, general construction
- C30, prefab roof trusses and where design requires somewhat stronger joists than C24 can offer. TR26 is also a common trussed rafter strength class in long standing use in the UK.
- C40, usually seen in glulam

Grading rules for African and South American sawn lumber have been developed by ATIBT according to the rules of the Sciages Avivés Tropicaux Africains (SATA) and is based on Clearcutting – established by the percentage of the clear surface.

=== North American hardwoods ===
In North America, market practices for dimensional lumber made from hardwoods (Note: Because working expensive hardwoods is far more difficult and costly, and because an odd width might well be conserved and be of use in making such surfaces as a cabinet side or tabletop joined from many smaller widths, the industry generally only does minimal processing, preserving as much board width as is practicable. This leaves culling and width decisions totally in the hands of the craftsman building cabinets or furniture with the boards.) varies significantly from the regularized standardized 'dimension lumber' sizes used for sales and specification of softwoods – hardwood boards are often sold totally rough cut, (Note: In quarter sawn thicknesses, meaning the thickness and width dimensions as they come out of the sawmill's table. Because lengths vary most with temperature, hardwood boards in the US often have a bit of extra length.) or machine planed only on the two (broader) face sides. When hardwood boards are also supplied with planed faces, it is usually both by random widths of a specified thickness (normally matching milling of softwood dimensional lumber) and somewhat random lengths. But besides those older (traditional and normal) situations, in recent years some product lines have been widened to also market boards in standard stock sizes; these usually retail in big-box stores and using only a relatively small set of specified lengths; (Note: Small set of specified lengths: Fixed-length hardwood boards in the United States are most common in 4–6 ft (1.2–1.8 m) lengths, with a good representation of 8 ft (2.4 m) lengths in a variety of widths, and a few widths with occasional dimensional sizes to 12 ft (3.7 m) lengths. Often the longer sizes need be special ordered.) in all cases hardwoods are sold to the consumer by the board-foot (144 cubic inches or 2,360 cubic centimetres), whereas that measure is not used for softwoods at the retailer (to the cognizance of the buyer). (Note: Fixed board lengths do not apply in all countries; for example, in Australia and the United States, many hardwood boards are sold to timber yards in packs with a common width profile (dimensions) but not necessarily consisting of boards of identical lengths.)

North American hardwood dimensional lumber sizes
Nominal (rough-sawn size)	S1S (surfaced on one side)	S2S (surfaced on two sides)
1/2 in	3/8 in (9.5 mm)	5/16 in (7.9 mm)
5/8 in	1/2 in (13 mm)	7/16 in (11 mm)
3/4 in	5/8 in (16 mm)	9/16 in (14 mm)
1 in or 4/4 in	7/8 in (22 mm)	13/16 in (21 mm)
1 1/4 in or 5/4 in	1 1/8 in (29 mm)	1 1/16 in (27 mm)
1 1/2 in or 6/4 in	1 3/8 in (35 mm)	1 5/16 in (33 mm)
2 in or 8/4 in	1 13/16 in (46 mm)	1 3/4 in (44 mm)
3 in or 12/4 in	2 13/16 in (71 mm)	2 3/4 in (70 mm)
4 in or 16/4 in	3 13/16 in (97 mm)	3 3/4 in (95 mm)

Also in North America, hardwood lumber is commonly sold in a "quarter" system, when referring to thickness; 4/4 (four quarter) refers to a 1-inch-thick (25 mm) board, 8/4 (eight quarter) is a 2-inch-thick (51 mm) board, etc. This "quarter" system is rarely used for softwood lumber; although softwood decking is sometimes sold as 5/4, even though it is actually one inch thick (from milling 1/8 in or 3.2 mm off each side in a motorized planing step of production). The "quarter" system of reference is a traditional North American lumber industry nomenclature used specifically to indicate the thickness of rough sawn hardwood lumber.

In rough-sawn lumber it immediately clarifies that the lumber is not yet milled, avoiding confusion with milled dimension lumber which is measured as actual thickness after machining. Examples include 3/4-inch, 19 mm, or 1x. In recent years architects, designers, and builders have begun to use the "quarter" system in specifications as a vogue of insider knowledge, though the materials being specified are finished lumber, thus conflating the separate systems and causing confusion.

Hardwoods cut for furniture are cut in the fall and winter, after the sap has stopped running in the trees. If hardwoods are cut in the spring or summer the sap ruins the natural color of the lumber and decreases the value of the wood for furniture.

=== Engineered lumber ===
Engineered lumber is lumber created by a manufacturer and designed for a certain structural purpose. The main categories of engineered lumber are:

- Laminated veneer lumber (LVL) – LVL comes in 1 3/4-inch (44 mm) thicknesses with depths such as 9 1/2, 11 7/8, 14, 16, 18 and 24 inches (240, 300, 360, 410, 460 and 610 mm), and are often doubled or tripled up. They function as beams to provide support over large spans, such as removed support walls and garage door openings, places where dimensional lumber is insufficient, and also in areas where a heavy load is bearing from a floor, wall or roof above on a somewhat short span where dimensional lumber is impractical. This type of lumber is compromised if it is altered by holes or notches anywhere within the span or at the ends, but nails can be driven into it wherever necessary to anchor the beam or to add hangers for I-joists or dimensional lumber joists that terminate at an LVL beam.
- Wooden I-joists – sometimes called "TJI", "Trus Joists" or "BCI", all of which are brands of wooden I-joists, they are used for floor joists on upper floors and also in first floor conventional foundation construction on piers as opposed to slab floor construction. They are engineered for long spans and are doubled up in places where a wall will be aligned over them, and sometimes tripled where heavy roof-loaded support walls are placed above them. They consist of a top and bottom chord or flange made from dimensional lumber with a webbing in-between made from oriented strand board (OSB) (or, latterly, steel mesh forms which allow passage of services without cutting). The webbing can be removed up to certain sizes or shapes according to the manufacturer's or engineer's specifications, but for small holes, wooden I-joists come with "knockouts", which are perforated, pre-cut areas where holes can be made easily, typically without engineering approval. When large holes are needed, they can typically be made in the webbing only and only in the center third of the span; the top and bottom chords lose their integrity if cut. Sizes and shapes of the hole, and typically the placing of a hole itself, must be approved by an engineer prior to the cutting of the hole and in many areas, a sheet showing the calculations made by the engineer must be provided to the building inspection authorities before the hole will be approved. Some I-joists are made with W-style webbing like a truss to eliminate cutting and to allow ductwork to pass through.
- Finger-jointed lumber – solid dimensional lumber lengths typically are limited to lengths of 22 to 24 feet (6.7–7.3 m), but can be made longer by the technique of "finger-jointing" by using small solid pieces, usually 18 to 24 inches (460–610 mm) long, and joining them together using finger joints and glue to produce lengths that can be up to 36 feet (11 m) long in 2×6 size. Finger-jointing also is predominant in precut wall studs. It is also an affordable alternative for non-structural hardwood that will be painted (staining would leave the finger-joints visible). Care is taken during construction to avoid nailing directly into a glued joint as stud breakage can occur.
- Glulam beams – created from 2×4 or 2×6 stock by gluing the faces together to create beams such as 4×12 or 6×16. As such, a beam acts as one larger piece of lumber – thus eliminating the need to harvest larger, older trees for the same size beam.
- Manufactured trusses – trusses are used in home construction as a pre-fabricated replacement for roof rafters and ceiling joists (stick-framing). It is seen as an easier installation and a better solution for supporting roofs than the use of dimensional lumber's struts and purlins as bracing. In the southern U.S. and elsewhere, stick-framing with dimensional lumber roof support is still predominant. The main drawbacks of trusses are reduced attic space, time required for engineering and ordering, and a cost higher than the dimensional lumber needed if the same project were conventionally framed. The advantages are significantly reduced labor costs (installation is faster than conventional framing), consistency, and overall schedule savings.

=== Various pieces and cuts ===
- Square and rectangular forms: plank, slat, batten, board, lath, strapping (typically 3/4 in × 1 1/2 in [19 mm × 38 mm]), cant (A partially sawn log such as sawn on two sides or squared to a large size and later resawn into lumber. A flitch is a type of cant with wane on one or both sides). Various pieces are also known by their uses such as post, beam, (girt), stud, rafter, joist, sill plate, wall plate.
- Rod forms: pole, (dowel), stick (staff, baton)

=== Timber piles ===
In the United States, pilings are mainly cut from southern yellow pines and Douglas-fir. Treated pilings are available in chromated copper arsenate retentions of 0.60, 0.80 and 2.50 pounds per cubic foot (9.6, 12.8 and 40.0 kg/m^{3}) if treatment is required.

=== Historical Chinese construction ===
Under the prescription of the Method of Construction (營造法式) issued by the Song dynasty government in the early twelfth century, timbers were standardized to eight cross-sectional dimensions. Regardless of the actual dimensions of the timber, the ratio between width and height was maintained at 1:1.5. Units are in Song dynasty inches (31.2 mm).

Class	height	width	uses
1st	9	6	great halls 11 or 9 bays wide
2nd	8.25	5.5	great halls 7 or 5 bays wide
3rd	7.5	5	great halls 5 or 3 bays wide or halls 7 or 5 bays wide
4th	7.2	4.8	great halls 3 bays wide or halls 5 bays wide
5th	6.6	4.4	great halls 3 small bays wide or halls 3 large bays wide
6th	6	4	pagodas and small halls
7th	5.25	3.5	pagodas and small great halls
8th	4.5	3	small pagodas and ceilings

Timber smaller than the 8th class was called "unclassed" (等外). The width of a timber is referred to as one "timber" (材), and the dimensions of other structural components were quoted in multiples of "timber"; thus, as the width of the actual timber varied, the dimensions of other components were easily calculated, without resorting to specific figures for each scale. The dimensions of timbers in similar applications show a gradual diminution from the Sui dynasty (580–618) to the modern era; a 1st class timber during the Sui was reconstructed as 15×10 (Sui dynasty inches, or 29.4 mm).

== Defects in lumber ==
Defects occurring in lumber are grouped into the following four divisions:

=== Conversion ===
During the process of converting timber to commercial forms of lumber the following defects may occur:

- Chip mark: this defect is indicated by the marks or signs placed by chips on the finished surface of timber
- Diagonal grain: improper sawing of timber
- Torn grain: when a small dent is made on the finished surface due to falling of some tool
- Wane: presence of original rounded surface in the finished product

=== Defects due to fungi and animals ===
Fungi attack wood (both timber and lumber) when these conditions are all present:

- The wood moisture content is above 25% on a dry-weight basis
- The environment is sufficiently warm
- Oxygen (O_{2}) is present

Wood with less than 25% moisture (dry weight basis) can remain free of decay for centuries. Similarly, wood submerged in water may not be attacked by fungi if the amount of oxygen is inadequate.

Fungi lumber/timber defects:

- Blue stain
- Brown rot
- Dry rot
- Heart rot
- Sap stain
- Wet rot
- White rot

Following are the insects and molluscs which are usually responsible for the decay of timber/lumber:

- Woodboring beetles
- Marine borers (Barnea similis)
- Teredos (Teredo navalis)
- Termites
- Carpenter ants
- Carpenter bees

=== Natural forces ===
There are two main natural forces responsible for causing defects in timber and lumber: abnormal growth and rupture of tissues. Rupture of tissue includes cracks or splits in the wood called "shakes". "Ring shake", "wind shake", or "ring failure" is when the wood grain separates around the growth rings either while standing or during felling. Shakes may reduce the strength of a timber and the appearance thus reduce lumber grade and may capture moisture, promoting decay. Eastern hemlock is known for having ring shake. A "check" is a crack on the surface of the wood caused by the outside of a timber shrinking as it seasons. Checks may extend to the pith and follow the grain. Like shakes, checks can hold water promoting rot. A "split" goes all the way through a timber. Checks and splits occur more frequently at the ends of lumber because of the more rapid drying in these locations.

Next to defects, uneven expansion or contraction caused by changes in moisture content will cause sawed timber to warp, making it less suitable for many purposes.

=== Seasoning ===
The seasoning of lumber is typically either kiln- or air-dried. Defects due to seasoning are the main cause of splits, bowing and honeycombing. Seasoning is the process of drying timber to remove the bound moisture contained in the walls of the wood cells to produce seasoned timber.

== Durability and service life ==
Under proper conditions, wood provides excellent, lasting performance. However, it also faces several potential threats to service life, including fungal activity and insect damage – which can be avoided in numerous ways. Section 2304.11 of the International Building Code addresses protection against decay and termites. This section provides requirements for non-residential construction applications, such as wood used above ground (e.g., for framing, decks, stairs, etc.), as well as other applications.

There are four recommended methods to protect wood-frame structures against durability hazards and thus provide maximum service life for the building. All require proper design and construction:

- Controlling moisture using design techniques to avoid decay
- Providing effective control of termites and other insects
- Using durable materials such as pressure-treated or naturally durable species of wood where appropriate
- Providing quality assurance during design and construction and throughout the building's service life using appropriate maintenance practices

=== Moisture control ===
Wood is a hygroscopic material, which means it naturally absorbs and releases water to balance its internal moisture content with the surrounding environment. The moisture content of wood is measured by the weight of water as a percentage of the oven-dry weight of the wood fiber. The key to controlling decay is controlling moisture. Once decay fungi are established, the minimum moisture content for decay to propagate is 22 to 24 percent, so building experts recommend 19 percent as the maximum safe moisture content for untreated wood in service. Water by itself does not harm the wood, but rather, wood with consistently high moisture content enables fungal organisms to grow.

The primary objective when addressing moisture loads is to keep water from entering the building envelope in the first place and to balance the moisture content within the building itself. Moisture control by means of accepted design and construction details is a simple and practical method of protecting a wood-frame building against decay. For applications with a high risk of staying wet, designers specify durable materials such as naturally decay-resistant species or wood that has been treated with preservatives. Cladding, shingles, sill plates and exposed timbers or glulam beams are examples of potential applications for treated wood.

=== Preservatives ===
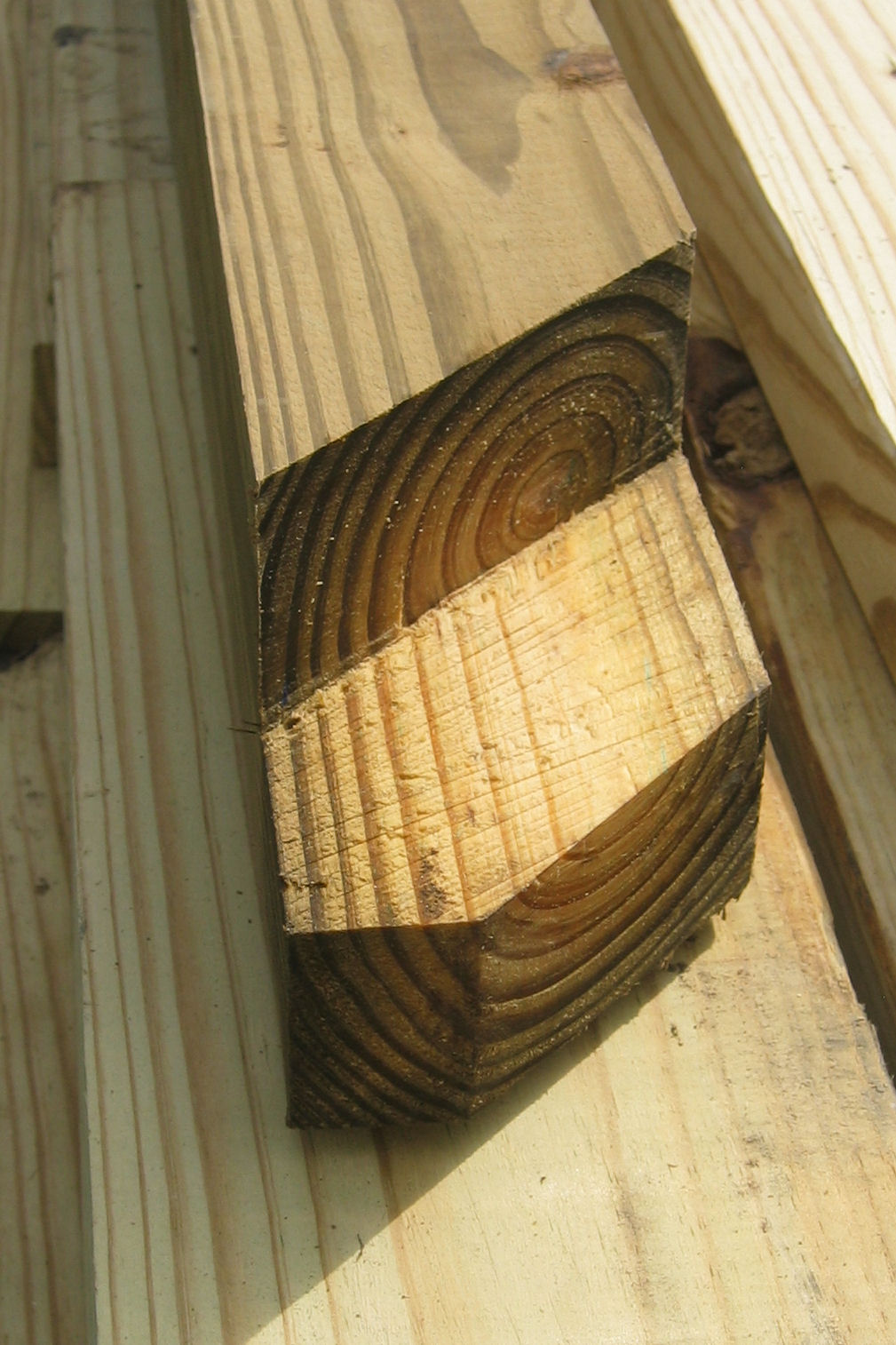
Special fasteners are used with treated lumber because of the corrosive chemicals used in its preservation process.

To avoid decay and termite infestation, untreated wood is separated from the ground and other sources of moisture. These separations are required by many building codes and are considered necessary to maintain wood elements in permanent structures at a safe moisture content for decay protection. When it is not possible to separate wood from the sources of moisture, designers often rely on preservative-treated wood.

Wood can be treated with a preservative that improves service life under severe conditions without altering its basic characteristics. It can also be pressure-impregnated with fire-retardant chemicals that improve its performance in a fire. One of the early treatments to "fireproof lumber", which retard fires, was developed in 1936 by the Protexol Corporation, in which lumber is heavily treated with salt. Wood does not deteriorate simply because it gets wet. When wood breaks down, it is because an organism is eating it. Preservatives work by making the food source inedible to these organisms. Properly preservative-treated wood can have 5 to 10 times the service life of untreated wood. Preserved wood is used most often for railroad ties, utility poles, marine piles, decks, fences and other outdoor applications. Various treatment methods and types of chemicals are available, depending on the attributes required in the particular application and the level of protection needed.

There are two basic methods of treating: with and without pressure. Non-pressure methods are the application of preservatives by brushing, spraying, or dipping the piece to be treated. Deeper, more thorough penetration is achieved by driving the preservative into the wood cells with pressure. Various combinations of pressure and vacuum are used to force adequate levels of chemical into the wood. Pressure-treating preservatives consist of chemicals carried in a solvent.

Chromated copper arsenate, once the most commonly used wood preservative in North America began being phased out of most residential applications in 2004. Replacing it are amine copper quat and copper azole.

All wood preservatives used in the United States and Canada are registered and regularly re-examined for safety by the U.S. Environmental Protection Agency and Health Canada's Pest Management and Regulatory Agency, respectively.

== Timber framing ==
Timber framing is a style of construction that uses heavier framing elements (larger posts and beams) than modern stick framing, which uses smaller standard dimensional lumber. The timbers are cut from log boles and squared with a saw, broadaxe or adze, and then joined together with joinery without nails. Modern timber framing has been growing in popularity in the United States since the 1970s.

== Environmental effects of lumber ==
Green building minimizes the impact or "environmental footprint" of a building. Wood is a major building material that is renewable and replenishable in a continuous cycle. Studies show manufacturing wood uses less energy and results in less air and water pollution than steel and concrete. However, demand for lumber is blamed for deforestation.

=== Residual wood ===
The conversion from coal to biomass power is a growing trend in the United States.

The United Kingdom, Uzbekistan, Kazakhstan, Australia, Fiji, Madagascar, Mongolia, Russia, Denmark, Switzerland, and Eswatini governments all support an increased role for energy derived from biomass, which are organic materials available on a renewable basis and include residues and/or byproducts of the logging, saw milling and paper-making processes. In particular, they view it as a way to lower greenhouse gas emissions by reducing the consumption of oil and gas while supporting the growth of forestry, agriculture and rural economies. Studies by the U.S. government have found the country's combined forest and agriculture land resources have the power to sustainably supply more than one-third of its current petroleum consumption.

Biomass is already an important source of energy for the North American forest products industry. It is common for companies to have cogeneration facilities, also known as combined heat and power, which convert some of the biomass that results from wood and paper manufacturing to electrical and thermal energy in the form of steam. The electricity is used to, among other things, dry lumber and supply heat to the dryers used in paper-making.

== Environmental impacts ==
Lumber is a sustainable and environmentally friendly construction material that could replace modern building materials (e.g. concrete and steel) given its structural performance, capacity to fixate CO_{2} and low energy demand during the manufacturing process.

Substituting lumber for concrete or steel avoids the carbon emissions of those materials. Cement and concrete manufacture is responsible for around 8% of global GHG emissions while the iron and steel industry is responsible for another 5% (half a ton of CO_{2} is emitted to manufacture a ton of concrete; two tons of CO_{2} are emitted in the manufacture of a ton of steel).

Advantages of lumber:

- Fire performance: In the case of fire, the outer layer of mass timber will tend to char in a predictable way that effectively self-extinguishes and shields the interior, allowing it to retain structural integrity for several hours, even in an intense fire.
- Reduction of carbon emissions: Building materials and construction make up 11% of global greenhouse gas emissions. Though the exact amount will depend on tree species, forestry practices, transportation costs, and several other factors, that one cubic meter of lumber sequesters roughly one tonne of CO_{2}. It is estimated that wood can reduce the amount of CO_{2} released into the atmosphere by half. In addition, wood has a significant CO_{2} storage capacity, which limits its release. However, when wood is destroyed (naturally or by combustion), all of the previously stored CO_{2} is released into the atmosphere.
- Natural insulation: lumber is a natural insulator which makes it particularly good for windows and doors.
- Less construction time, labor costs, and waste: it is easy to manufacture prefabricated lumber, from which pieces can be assembled simultaneously (with relatively little labor). This reduces material waste, avoids massive on-site inventory, and minimizes on-site disruption. According to the softwood lumber industry, "Mass timber buildings are roughly 25% faster to construct than concrete buildings and require 90% less construction traffic".

== End-of-life ==
An EPA study showed the typical end-of-life scenario for wood waste from municipal solid waste (MSW), wood packaging, and other miscellaneous wood products in the US. Based on the 2018 data, about 67% of wood waste was landfilled, 16% incinerated with energy recovery, and 17% recycled.

A 2020 study conducted by Edinburgh Napier University demonstrated the proportional waste stream of recovered lumber in the UK. The study showed that timber from municipal solid waste and packaging waste made up 13 and 26% of waste collected. Construction and demolition waste made up the biggest bulk of waste collectively at 52%, with the remaining 10% coming from industry.

== In the circular economy ==
The lumber industry creates large amounts of waste, especially in its manufacturing process. From log debarking to finished products, there are several stages of processing that generate a considerable volume of waste, which includes solid wood waste, harmful gases, and residual water.

One of the studies conducted in Hong Kong was done using life-cycle assessment (LCA). The study aimed to assess and compare the environmental impacts of wood waste management from building construction activities using different alternative management scenarios in Hong Kong. Despite various advantages of lumber and its waste, the contribution to the study of the circular economy of lumber is still very small. Some areas where improvements can be made to improve the circularity of lumber is as follows:

1. First, regulations to support recycled lumber use. For example, establishing grading standards and enforcing penalties for improper disposal, especially in sectors that produce big quantities of wood waste, such as the construction and demolition sector.
2. Second, creating a stronger supply force. This can be achieved by improving demolition protocol and technology and enhancing the secondary raw materials market through circular business models.
3. Third, increase demand by introducing incentives to the construction sector and new homeowners to use recycled lumber. This can be in the form of reduced taxes for the construction of the new build.

== Secondary raw material ==
The term secondary raw material denotes waste material that has been recycled and injected back into use as productive material. Lumber has a high potential to be used as a secondary raw material at various stages, as listed below:

Recovery of branches and leaves for use as fertilisers
Timber undergo multiple processing stages before lumber of desired shapes, size, and standards are achieved for commercial use. The process generates a lot of waste which in most cases is disregarded. But being an organic waste, the positive aspect of such waste is that it can be used as a fertiliser or to protect the soil in severe weather conditions.
Recovery of woodchips for thermal energy generation
Waste generated during the manufacturing of lumber products can be used to produce thermal energy. Lumber products after their end-of-life can be downcycled into chips and be used as biomass to produce thermal energy. It is beneficial for industries that need thermal energy.

Circular economy practices offer effective solutions concerning waste. It targets its unnecessary generation through waste reduction, reuse, and recycling. There is no clear explicit evidence of circular economy in the wood panel industry. However, based on the circular economy concept and its characteristics, there are opportunities present in the wood panel industry from the raw material extraction phase to its end-of-life. Therefore, there lies a gap yet to be explored.

== See also ==
- Cubic ton
- Deck (building)
- Engineered wood
- Forestry
- Hardwood timber production
- List of woods
- Log house
- Lumber room
- Lumberjack
- Natural building
- Reclaimed lumber
- Recycling timber
- Table of Wood and Bamboo Mechanical and Agricultural Properties
- Timber treatment
- Wood industry
- Woodworking
- Yakisugi
