= Blodget =

Blodget is a surname. Notable people with the surname include:

- Dudley Blodget (1820–1856), American politician
- Henry Blodget (born 1966), American businessman, investor, and journalist
- Lorin Blodget (1823–1901), American physicist and writer

== See also ==
- Blodgett (surname)
