= Euthenics =

Study of improving living conditions to increase well-being

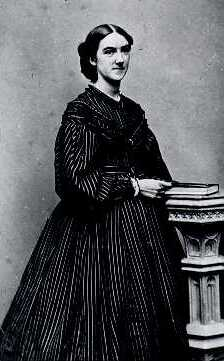
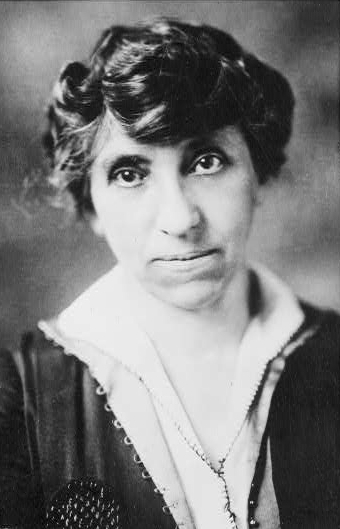
Ellen Swallow Richards (left), the first female student and instructor at MIT, was one of the first to use the term, while Julia Clifford Lathrop (right) continued to promote it in the form of an interdisciplinary academic program later to be mostly absorbed into the field of home economics.

"Eugenics deals with race improvement through heredity.
Euthenics deals with race improvement through environment.
Eugenics is hygiene for the future generations.
Euthenics is hygiene for the present generation.
Eugenics must await careful investigation.
Euthenics has immediate opportunity.
Euthenics precedes eugenics, developing better men now, and thus inevitably creating a better race of men in the future. Euthenics is the term proposed for the preliminary science on which Eugenics must be based."

— Ellen Swallow Richards (1910)

Euthenics (/juːˈθɛnɪks/) is the study of the improvement of human functioning and well-being by the improvement of living conditions. "Improvement" is conducted by altering external factors such as education and the controllable environments, including environmentalism, education regarding employment, home economics, sanitation, and housing, as well as the prevention and removal of contagious disease and parasites.

In a New York Times article dated May 23, 1926, Rose Field notes of the description, "the simplest [is] efficient living". It is also described as "a right to environment", commonly as dual to a "right of birth" that correspondingly falls under the purview of eugenics.

In contrast to eugenics, euthenics does not intentionally attempt to alter the composition of the human gene pool. However, improvements to one's quality of life, such as eradication of diseases or access to proper nutrition, can potentially have indirect effects on the genetics of the population.

== Etymology ==
The term was derived in the late 19th century from the Greek verb eutheneo, εὐθηνέω (eu, well; the, root of τίθημι tithemi, to cause). (To be in a flourishing state, to abound in, to prosper.—Demosthenes. To be strong or vigorous.—Herodotus. To be vigorous in body.—Aristotle.)

Also from the Greek Euthenia, Εὐθηνία. Good state of the body: prosperity, good fortune, abundance.—Herodotus.

The opposite of Euthenia is Penia, Πενία ("deficiency" or "poverty") the personification of poverty and need.

== History ==
Ellen Swallow Richards (1842–1911) was one of the first writers to use the term, in The Cost of Shelter (1905), with the meaning "the science of better living". It is unclear if (and probably unlikely that) any of the study programs of euthenics ever completely embraced Richards' multidisciplinary concept, though several nuances remain today, especially that of interdisciplinarity.

=== Vassar College Institute of Euthenics ===
After Richards' death in 1911, Julia Lathrop (1858–1932) continued to promote the development of an interdisciplinary program in euthenics at Vassar College, of which both she and Richards were alumni. Lathrop soon teamed with alumna Minnie Cumnock Blodgett (1862–1931), who with her husband, John Wood Blodgett, offered financial support to create a program of euthenics at the college. Curriculum planning, suggested by Vassar president Henry Noble MacCracken in 1922, began in earnest by 1923, under the direction of Professor Annie Louise Macleod, who had become the first female PhD at McGill University in 1910.

According to Vassar's chronology entry for March 17, 1924, "the faculty recognized euthenics as a satisfactory field for sequential study (major). A Division of Euthenics was authorized to offer a multidisciplinary program [radical at the time] focusing the techniques and disciplines of the arts, sciences and social sciences on the life experiences and relationships of women. Students in euthenics could take courses in horticulture, food chemistry, sociology and statistics, education, child study, economics, economic geography, physiology, hygiene, public health, psychology and domestic architecture and furniture. With the new division came the first major in child study at an American liberal arts college."

For example, a typical major in child study in euthenics includes introductory psychology, laboratory psychology, applied psychology, child study and social psychology in the Department of Psychology; the three courses offered in the Department of Child Study; beginning economics, programs of social reorganization and the family in Economics; and in the Department of Physiology, human physiology, child hygiene, principles of public health.

The Vassar Summer Institute of Euthenics accepted its first students in June 1926. Created to supplement the controversial euthenics major which began on February 21, 1925, it was also located in the new Minnie Cumnock Blodgett Hall of Euthenics (designed by York & Sawyer, with the ground broken on October 25, 1925). Some Vassar faculty members (perhaps emotionally upset with being displaced on campus to make way, or otherwise politically motivated) contentiously "believed the entire concept of euthenics was vague and counter-productive to women's progress."

Having overcome a lukewarm reception, Vassar College officially opened its Minnie Cumnock Blodgett Hall of Euthenics in 1929. Dr. Ruth Wheeler took over as director of euthenics studies in 1924. Wheeler remained director until Mary Shattuck Fisher Langmuir succeeded her in 1944, until 1951.

The college continued for the 1934–35 academic year its successful cooperative housing experiment in three residence halls. Intended to help students meet their college costs by working in their residences. For example, in Main, students earned $40 a year by doing relatively light work such as cleaning their rooms.

In 1951, Katharine Blodgett Hadley (graduated from the college in 1920) donated $400,000, through the Rubicon Foundation, to Vassar to help fund operating deficits in the current and succeeding years and to improve faculty salaries.

"Discontinued for financial reasons, the Vassar Summer Institute for Family and Community Living, founded in 1926 as the Vassar Summer Institute of Euthenics, held its last session, July 2, 1958. This was the first and last session for the institute's new director, Dr. Mervin Freedman."

=== Elmira College ===
Elmira College is noted as the oldest college still in existence which (as a college for women) granted degrees to women which were the equivalent of those given to men (the first to do so was the now-defunct Mary Sharp College). Elmira College became coeducational in all of its programs in 1969.

A special article was written in the December 12, 1937, The New York Times, quoting recent graduates of Elmira College, urging for courses in colleges for men on the care of children. Reporting that "preparation for the greatest of all professions, that of motherhood and child-training, is being given the students at Elmira College in the Nursery School which is Conducted as part of the Department of Euthenics."

Elmira College was one of the first of the liberal arts colleges to recognize the fact that women should have some special training, integrated with the so-called liberal studies, which would prepare them to carry on, with less effort and fewer mistakes, a successful family life. Courses in nutrition, household economics, clothing selection, principles of foods and meal planning, child psychology, and education in family relations were part of the curriculum.

The Elmira College nursery school for fifteen children between the ages of two and five years was opened primarily as a laboratory for college students, but it had become so popular with parents in the community that there was always a long waiting list.

The New York Times article notes how the nursery had become one of the essential laboratories of the college, where recent mothers testified to the value of the training they received while in college. The Times reported, one graduate as saying: "Today, when it is often necessary for young women to continue professional work outside the home after marriage, it is important that young fathers, who must share in the actual care and training of the children, should have some knowledge of correct methods."

=== Today ===
Many factors led to the movement never getting the funding it needed to remain relevant, including: vigorous debate about the exact meaning of euthenics, a strong antifeminism movement paralleling even stronger women's rights movements, confusion with the term eugenics, the economic impact of the Great Depression and two world wars. These factors also prevented the discipline from gaining the attention it needed to put together a lasting, vastly multidisciplinary curriculum. Therefore, it split off into separate disciplines. Child Study is one such curriculum.

Martin Heggestad of the Mann Library notes that "Starting around 1920, however, home economists tended to move into other fields, such as nutrition and textiles, that offered more career opportunities, while health issues were dealt with more in the hard sciences and in the professions of nursing and public health. Also, improvements in public sanitation (for example, the wider availability of sewage systems and of food inspection) led to a decline in infectious diseases and thus a decreasing need for the largely household-based measures taught by home economists." Thus, the end of euthenics as originally defined by Ellen Swallow Richards ensued.

== Debate, misconceptions and opposition ==
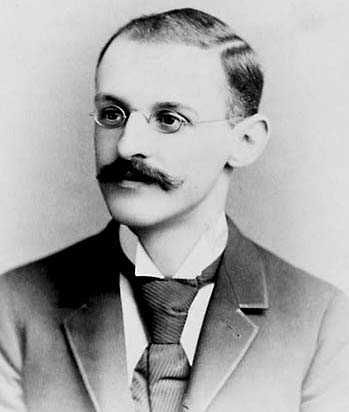
Abraham Flexner, c. 1895

The influential historian of education Abraham Flexner questions its scientific value in stating:

[T]he "science" is artificially pieced together of bits of mental hygiene, child guidance, nutrition, speech development and correction, family problems, wealth consumption, food preparation, household technology, and horticulture. A nursery school and a school for little children are also included. The institute is actually justified in an official publication by the profound question of a girl student who is reported as asking, "What is the connection of Shakespeare with having a baby?" The Vassar Institute of Euthenics bridges this gap!

Eugenicist Charles Benedict Davenport noted in his article "Euthenics and Eugenics", reprinted in Popular Science Monthly:

Thus the two schools of euthenics and eugenics stand opposed, each viewing the other unkindly. Against eugenics it is urged that it is a fatalistic doctrine and deprives life of the stimulus toward effort. Against euthenics the other side urges that it demands an endless amount of money to patch up conditions in the vain effort to get greater efficiency. Which of the two doctrines is true?

The thoughtful mind must concede that, as is so often the case where doctrines are opposed, each view is partial, incomplete and really false. The truth does not exactly lie between the doctrines; it comprehends them both.

[...] [I]n the generations to come, the teachings and practice of euthenics [...] [may] yield greater result because of the previous practice of the principles of eugenics.

Along similar lines, Edward L. Thorndike, a psychologist and early intelligence researcher, argued some two years later for an understanding that better integrates eugenic study:

The more rational the race becomes, the better roads, ships, tools, machines, foods, medicines and the like it will produce to aid itself, though it will need them less. The more sagacious and just and humane the original nature that is bred into man, the better schools, laws, churches, traditions and customs it will fortify itself by. There is no so certain and economical a way to improve man's environment as to improve his nature.

== See also ==
- Accountability
- Critical thinking
- Dysgenics
- Ecology
- Educational attainment in the United States
- Environment and intelligence
- Eudaimonia
- Euphenics
- Fertility and intelligence
- Flynn effect
- Home economics
- Impact of health on intelligence
- The Jukes family
- The Kallikak family
- Nature versus nurture
- Population health
- Social design
