= Bressummer =

Load-bearing beam in a timber-framed building

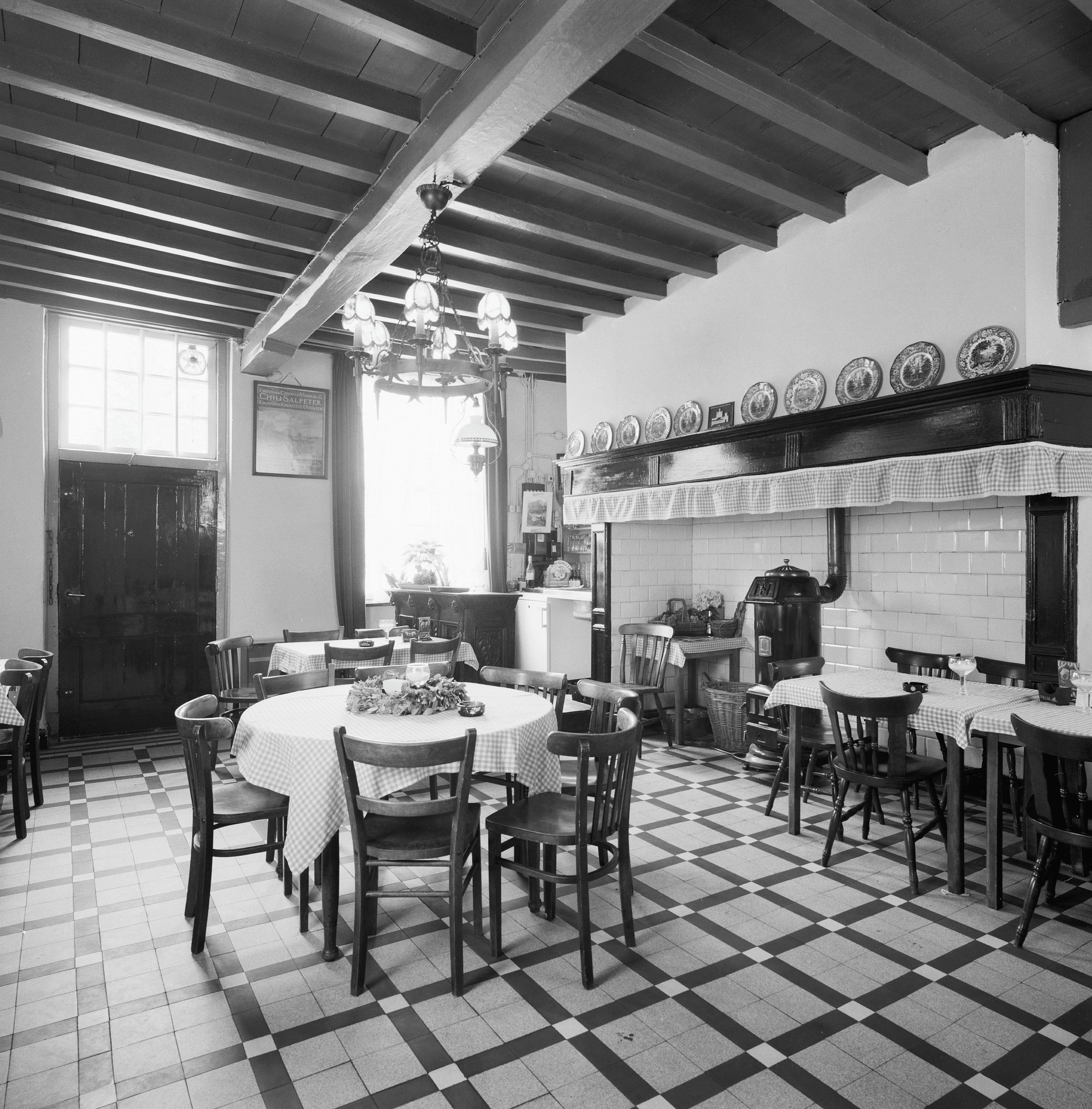
A typical summer beam with slender joists in the ceiling of a cafe in the Netherlands. Image: Cultural Heritage Agency of the Netherlands.

A bressummer, breastsummer, summer beam (somier, sommier, sommer, somer, cross-somer, summer, summier, summer-tree, or dorman, dormant tree) is a load-bearing beam in a timber-framed building. The word summer derived from sumpter or French sommier, "a pack horse", meaning "bearing great burden or weight". "To support a superincumbent wall", "any beast of burden", and in this way is similar to a wall plate.

The use and definition of these terms vary but generally a bressummer is a jetty sill and a summer is an interior beam supporting ceiling joists, see below:

- (UK) In the outward part of the building, and the middle floors (not in the garrets or ground floors) into which the girders are framed. In the inner parts of a building, such beams are called "summers". It is part of the timber-frame construction in the overhanging upper story in jettying.
- (UK) "Horizontal beam over a fireplace opening (alternatively lintel, mantel beam), or set forward from the lower part of a building to support a jettied wall, a jetty bressummer".
- (UK) "...usually the sill of the upper wall above a jetty; otherwise any beam spanning an opening and supporting a wall above." also called a "jetty sill".
- (UK) Breastsummer is a beam in a wall which carries the load over a large opening derived from breast being in the front, mid-level and summer: "A horizontal, bearing beam in a building; spec. the main beam supporting the girders or joists of a floor...".
- "a main piece of timber that supports a building, an architrave between two pillars"
- "Breast-Summer, an architectural term for a beam employed like a lintel to support the front of a building, is a corruption of bressumer..."
- (US) "Summer beam: A large timber spanning a room and supporting smaller floor joists on both sides."
- (US) "Summer beam. Heavy main horizontal beam, anchored in gable foundation walls, that supports forebay beams and barn frame above."
