= Blodgett (surname) =

Blodgett is an English family-surname of uncertain origin. Several researchers claim a French-Norman descent for the name, and point out that one Robert Bloct (Blojet or Bloyet) was a Norman bishop in the service of William the Conqueror. Robert came to England during the Norman Conquest and was appointed Bishop of Lincoln. Other research suggests a French Huguenot ancestry. There are records for the family, from the fifteenth through the seventeenth centuries, in the eastern area of England north of London.

In the United States, the entire Blodgett family, from all available records, descends from one English couple. Thomas Blodgett, born in 1604, emigrated to America in 1635 with his wife Susan. Thomas was born on November 18, 1604, in Stowmarket, Suffolk County. England, and settled with Susan in Cambridge in the Massachusetts Bay Colony. The couple became active residents of their new town, and had at least seven children.

Notable people with this surname include:

- Cindy Blodgett (born 1975), American basketball player
- E. D. Blodgett (1934–2018), Canadian writer
- Gary Blodgett (1937–2021), American physician and politician
- Geoffrey Blodgett (1931–2001), American historian
- Henry Williams Blodgett (1821–1905), United States federal judge
- Isaac N. Blodgett (1838–1905), associate justice and chief justice of the New Hampshire Supreme Court
- John W. Blodgett (1860–1951), American banker, lumberman, and philanthropist
- Joseph Haygood Blodgett (1858–1934), American architect and contractor
- Katharine Burr Blodgett (1898–1979), American physicist and chemist
- Michael Blodgett (1939–2007), American actor
- Minnie Cumnock Blodgett (1862–1931) American activist, worked for children's health and welfare, and Vassar benefactor
- Polly Blodgett (1919–2018), American figure skater
- Rufus Blodgett (1834–1910), American politician
- Samuel Blodgett (1724–1807), American lawyer, industrialist, and financier
- Timothy Blodgett (born 1966), American law enforcement officer, Sergeant at Arms of the United States House of Representatives, 2021

Fictional characters:

- Esther Blodgett, main character in the film A Star Is Born (1954 film)
