= Hersey Township, Michigan =

- Civil township
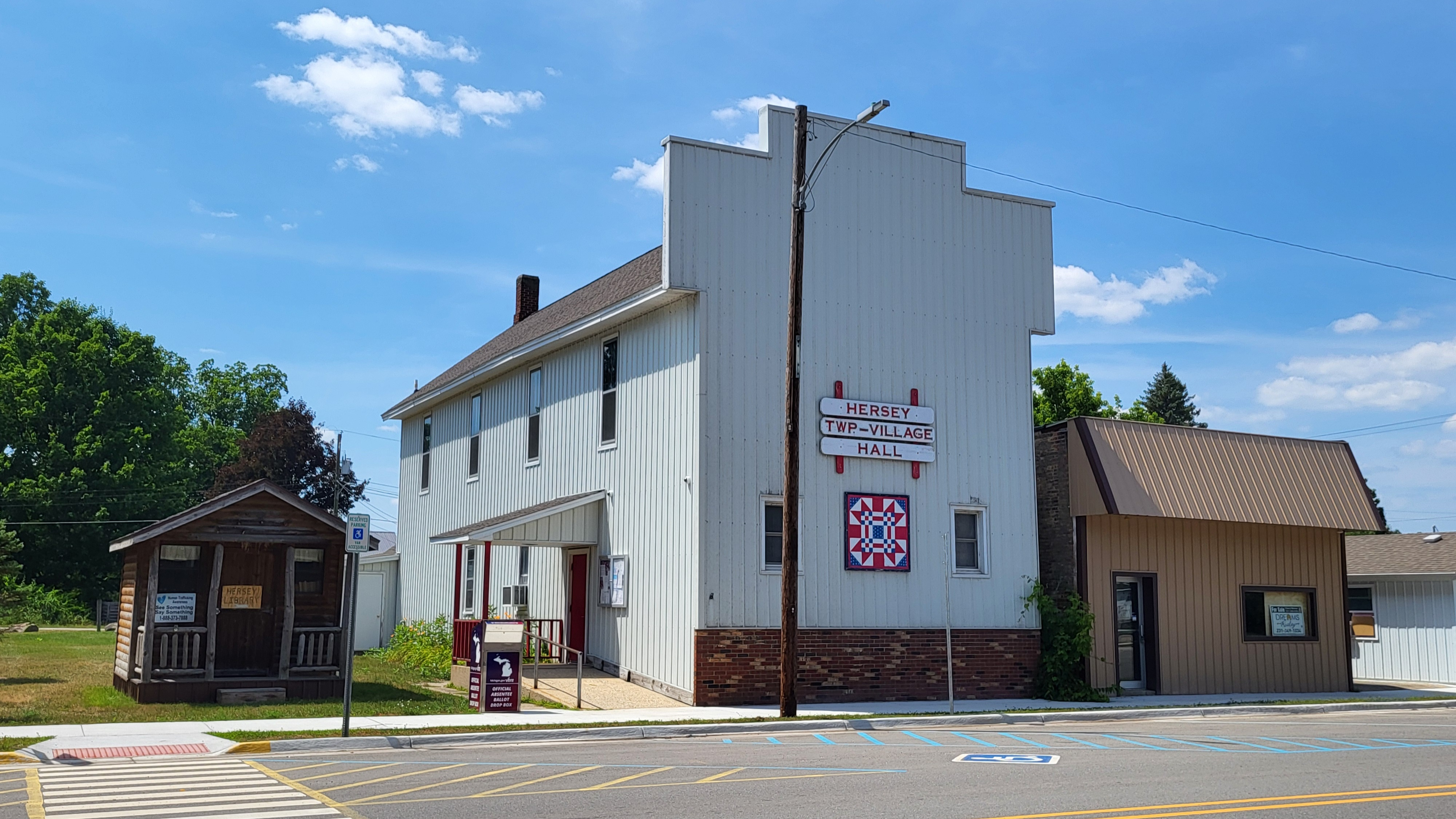
- Hersey Township Hall in Hersey

- Location within Osceola County (red) and the administered village of Hersey (pink)

- Location within the state of Michigan Location within the United States
- Coordinates: 43°51′23″N 85°23′40″W
- Country: United States
- State: Michigan
- County: Osceola
- Established: 1868

Government
  - Supervisor: Marco Menezes
  - Clerk: Jennifer Verdi-Stieg

Area
  - Total: 35.90 sq mi (92.98 km^{2})
  - Land: 35.35 sq mi (91.56 km^{2})
  - Water: 0.55 sq mi (1.42 km^{2})
- Elevation: 1,014 ft (309 m)

Population (2020)
  - Total: 1,941
  - Density: 54.9/sq mi (21.2/km^{2})
- Time zone: UTC-5 (Eastern (EST))
  - Summer (DST): UTC-4 (EDT)
- ZIP code: 49631 (Evart); 49639 (Hersey); 49655 (LeRoy)
- Area code: 231
- FIPS code: 26-37840
- GNIS feature ID: 1626466
- Website: Official website

Hersey Township is a civil township of Osceola County in the U.S. state of Michigan. The population was 1,941 at the 2020 census. The village of Hersey is located within the township.

== Geography ==
According to the United States Census Bureau, the township has a total area of 35.9 square miles (93 km^{2}), of which 35.3 square miles (91 km^{2}) is land and 0.6 square miles (1.6 km^{2}) (1.67%) is water.

== Demographics ==
As of the census of 2000, there were 1,846 people, 687 households, and 511 families residing in the township. The population density was 52.3 inhabitants per square mile (20.2/km^{2}). There were 1,041 housing units at an average density of 29.5 per square mile (11.4/km^{2}). The racial makeup of the township was 97.18% White, 0.33% African American, 0.16% Native American, 0.33% Asian, 0.27% from other races, and 1.73% from two or more races. Hispanic or Latino of any race were 1.03% of the population.

There were 687 households, out of which 34.5% had children under the age of 18 living with them, 61.9% were married couples living together, 8.2% had a female householder with no husband present, and 25.5% were non-families. 20.7% of all households were made up of individuals, and 7.6% had someone living alone who was 65 years of age or older. The average household size was 2.63 and the average family size was 3.00.

In the township the population was spread out, with 28.9% under the age of 18, 7.6% from 18 to 24, 26.5% from 25 to 44, 25.8% from 45 to 64, and 11.2% who were 65 years of age or older. The median age was 36 years. For every 100 females, there were 100.0 males. For every 100 females age 18 and over, there were 98.3 males.

The median income for a household in the township was $39,706, and the median income for a family was $42,961. Males had a median income of $29,609 versus $21,106 for females. The per capita income for the township was $16,612. About 6.7% of families and 8.9% of the population were below the poverty line, including 10.7% of those under age 18 and 10.1% of those age 65 or over.
