= Minnie Cumnock Blodgett =

Public health philanthropist

Minnie A. Cumnock Blodgett
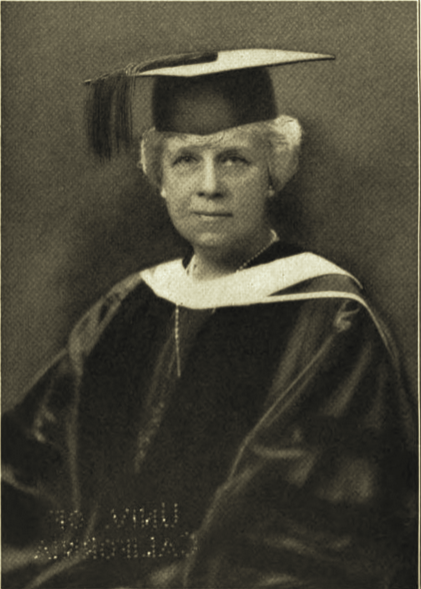
- (1925)
- Born: Minnie Alice Cumnock; 1862; Lowell, Massachusetts
- Died: October 13, 1931 (aged 68)
- Education: Vassar College (1884)
- Occupations: Public Health, Philanthropy
- Spouse: John W. Blodgett married 1895 until her death 1931
- Children: John Wood Blodgett, Jr. (1901 - 1987); Kathrine Cumnock Blodgett Hadley (January 13, 1898 - August 11, 1980 (aged 82))
- Parents: Alexander G. Cumnock; Frances Ross Cumnock

Minnie Cumnock Blodgett (1862–1931) graduated from Vassar College in 1884, later becoming a trustee (1917–1931). She is known for her role in the euthenics movement, particularly through philanthropy.

== Vassar College and euthenics program ==
After Ellen Swallow Richards' death in 1911, Julia Lathrop (1858–1932), another of Vassar's most distinguished alumnae, continued to promote the development of an interdisciplinary program in euthenics at the college. Lathrop soon teamed with alumna Minnie Cumnock Blodgett, who with her husband, John Wood Blodgett, offered financial support to create a program of euthenics at Vassar College. Curriculum planning, suggested by Vassar president Henry Noble MacCracken in 1922, began in earnest by 1923.

In 1925, through a gift of $550,000.00 from Mrs. Blodgett, the Institute of Euthenics was founded at Vassar. Its aim was "to supply scientific knowledge of the complex problems of adjustment between individuals and the environment, emphasizing home and family." Vassar historian Elizabeth Daniels noted "The Blodgetts' gift was the largest gift given to the College after Matthew Vassar donated $408,000 in 1861 to get the College started ... Their intention was to bring into the curriculum of the College a course of study specifically designed around the ideas of Ellen Swallow Richards."

== Death ==
Blodgett died suddenly of heart disease on October 13, 1931, in her suite in The St. Regis Hotel, New York, NY. She was there to attend meetings for two health organizations and spend some time visiting her daughter and son-in-law. According to her obituary in the New York Times, she was a director of the Child Study Association, the National Organization for Public Health Nursing, and was a member of the National Committee on Mental Hygiene. She was the daughter of the late Mr. and Mrs. Alexander G. Cunnock [sic] of Lowell, Mass. She was also president of the D.A. Blodgett Home for Children, and sat on the board of trustees at Vassar College.

== Descendants ==
Descendants include:

- John Wood Blodgett, Jr., who married Sally Reed Gallagher, of Milton, MA, on September 28, 1939. He attended St. Mark's School in Southboro, and graduated Harvard in 1923.
- Kathrine Cumnock Blodgett Hadley, who married Major Morris Hadley, July 12, 1919.
- John Wood Blodgett Hadley (1930 - 1994). who married Katrina Boyden Hadley (1930-1969), she is buried in the Blodgett Plot.

== Blodgett Family Archives ==
According to the Finding aid for Blodgett Family papers, 1872-1953 abstract at Bentley Historical Library within the University of Michigan Digital Library, the archive contains :

Family of Delos A. Blodgett, his son John W. Blodgett, and his grandson John W. Blodgett, Jr., residents of Grand Rapids, Michigan and owners of a series of logging companies active in Michigan, Mississippi, California, Oregon, and Vancouver Island. Correspondence, journals, cash books, ledgers, and maps of family businesses, including the Blodgett Company, Wright-Blodgett Company, Michigan-California Lumber Company, Michigan Timber Company, Hill-Davis Company, and Tidewater Timber Company; also personal correspondence and photographs.
