= William Blodgett House =

Historic house in Massachusetts, United States

- U.S. National Register of Historic Places
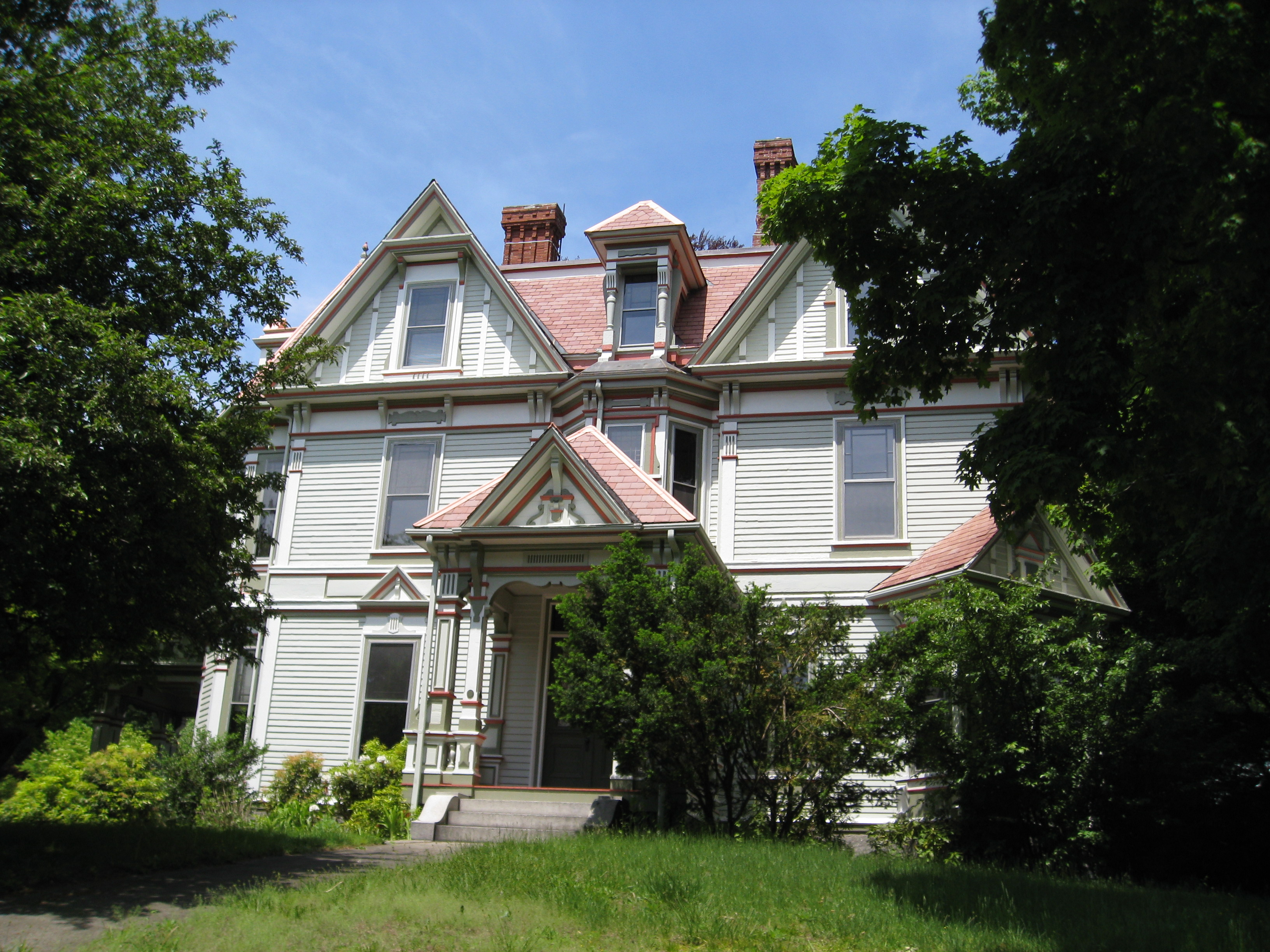

- Location within Massachusetts Location within the United States
- Location: 645 Centre St., Newton, Massachusetts
- Coordinates: 42°20′58″N 71°11′17″W
- Built: 1875
- Architectural style: Stick-Eastlake
- MPS: Newton MRA
- NRHP reference No.: 86001776
- Added to NRHP: September 04, 1986

The William Blodgett House is a historic house at 11 Fairmont Avenue in the Newton Corner neighborhood of Newton, Massachusetts. Built about 1875, it is a prominent local example of Stick style architecture. It was listed on the National Register of Historic Places in 1986, where it is listed at 645 Centre Street.

== Description and history ==
The William Blodgett House stands in a residential area southwest of the village center of Newton Corner, at the northwest corner of Centre Street and Fairmont Avenue. The house is set facing Centre Street on a low rise edged by a low stone retaining wall. It is 2 1/2 stories in height, and is basically rectangular in footprint, although this is obscured by numerous projections. It has a side-gable roof, with two large front-facing gables, between which is a small hip-roof dormer. A polygonal turret projects from the left side. Gable eaves are adorned with brackets, single and in pairs, and there is applied woodwork on some sections. An elaborate front porch is matched in decorative detail by a porte-cochere on the side of the house, where a semicircular drive provides access from Fairmont Avenue. The brick chimneys that project from the roof have panelled sides and corbelled tops.

The house was built about 1875 and is an excellent representation of Stick style architecture. William Blodgett, who bought it in 1879, was a Boston carpet merchant, and typifies the upper-class suburban residences built in Newton during the post-Civil War years.

== See also ==
- National Register of Historic Places listings in Newton, Massachusetts
