= American Lumber Standard Committee =

Nonprofit organization

- Abbreviation: ALSC
- Founded: 1922; 104 years ago
- Tax ID no.: 52-1951446
- Legal status: 501(c)(3) nonprofit organization
- Headquarters: Frederick, Maryland, U.S.
- Coordinates: 39.377360°N 77.399266°W
- Revenue: $3,206,301 (2018)
- Expenses: $$2,841,125 (2018)
- Employees: 14 (2018)
- Volunteers: 21 (2018)
- Website: www.alsc.org
- Formerly called: Central Committee on Lumber Standards

The American Lumber Standard Committee (ALSC) is a 501(c)(3) nonprofit organization.

== History ==
The Central Committee on Lumber Standards was started in 1922 by Herbert Hoover when he was U.S. Secretary of Commerce at the request of the lumber industry. Chaired by John W. Blodgett, the Central Committee was intended to be a way to create voluntary lumber standards without imposing formal government regulations, in order to solve the problem of lumber manufacturers selling lumber that was not actually as thick as the lumber was marketed as being. The Central Committee collected information before establishing its standards. In 1924, the Central Committee developed standard that described lumber sizes, methodology for assigning design values, nomenclature, and inspection procedures. Several decades later, the American Lumber Standard Committee succeeded the Central Committee. The ALSC supervises and creates grading standards and standard patterns of softwood lumber.
