= Wall plate =

Horizontal load-bearing member in wood framing

A typical wall section in platform framing: 1. Cripple; 2. Window header; 3. Top plate / upper wall plate; 4. Window sill; 5. Stud; 6. Sill plate / sole plate / bottom plate

A plate or wall plate is a horizontal, structural, load-bearing member in wooden building framing.

== Timber framing ==
A plate in timber framing is "A piece of Timber upon which some considerable weight is framed...Hence Ground-Plate...Window-plate [obsolete]..." etc. Also called a wall plate, raising plate, or top plate, An exception to the use of the term plate for a large, load-bearing timber in a wall is the bressummer, a timber supporting a wall over a wall opening (see also: lintel). These are common in Australia.

The terms sole plate or sill plate are used for the members at the bottom of a wall at the foundation but are most often just called a sole or sill without the word plate. Other load-bearing timbers use the term plate but are not in the wall such as crown plate, a purlin-like beam carried by crown posts in roof framing, and a purlin plate which supports common rafters.

== Platform framing ==
In platform framing there are three types of wall plates and are located at the top and bottom of a wall section, and the two hold the wall studs parallel and spaced at the correct interval. Each type continues in a piecewise fashion around the whole perimeter of the structure.

- Sill plates — a lower wall plate which is bolted or strapped securely to the top of a foundation wall or concrete slab. These hold the house down against heavy winds. Normally, "J-bolts" are placed in the curing concrete after the mason levels the foundation and finishes dressing the concrete or anchor bolts are drilled into the concrete foundation. Newer systems of galvanized strapping with a J-bolt like anchor placed in the concrete allows the builder to avoid the mating step of drilling the sill plates for the bolts.
- Lower wall plates, base plate, floor plate, or bottom plate — a second lower wall plate to which the wall studs are through nailed and which is the bottom of the wall section when assembled as a rectangular assembly. On an upper story, the lower wall plate is nailed to the platform of the supporting floor. The supporting platform is being supported by the wall studs of the even lower walls below.
- Upper wall plate, top plate or ceiling plate — upper wall plate which is fastened along the top of the wall studs, before the wall is lifted into position and on which the platform of the next story or the ceiling and roof assembly rest and are attached. A second layer of dimensional lumber is always fastened to the top plates of the erected walls so that no joints overlap, providing greatly increased stability. In North America this is known as a "double top plate" and the process of installing the second top plate is known as "top plating."
