= Sill plate =

Bottom horizontal member of a wall which vertical members are attached to

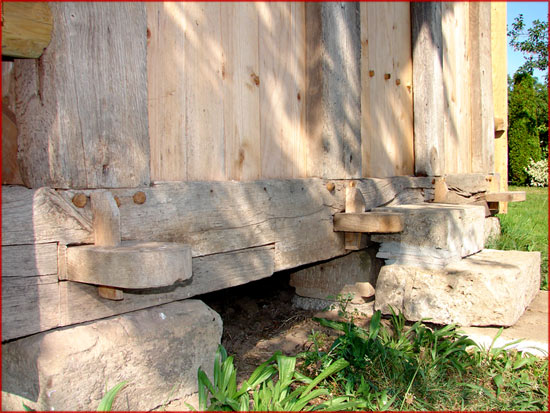
Unusual sill framing in a granary of half-timber construction. Long tenons project through the sill plate. Timber sills can span gaps in a foundation.

A sill plate or sole plate in construction and architecture is the bottom horizontal member of a wall or building to which vertical members are attached. The word "plate" is typically omitted in America and carpenters speak simply of the "sill". Other names are bottom plate, rat sill, ground plate, ground sill, groundsel, night plate, and midnight sill.

Sill plates are usually composed of lumber but can be any material. The timber at the top of a wall is often called a top plate, pole plate, mudsill, wall plate or simply "the plate".

== Timber sills ==
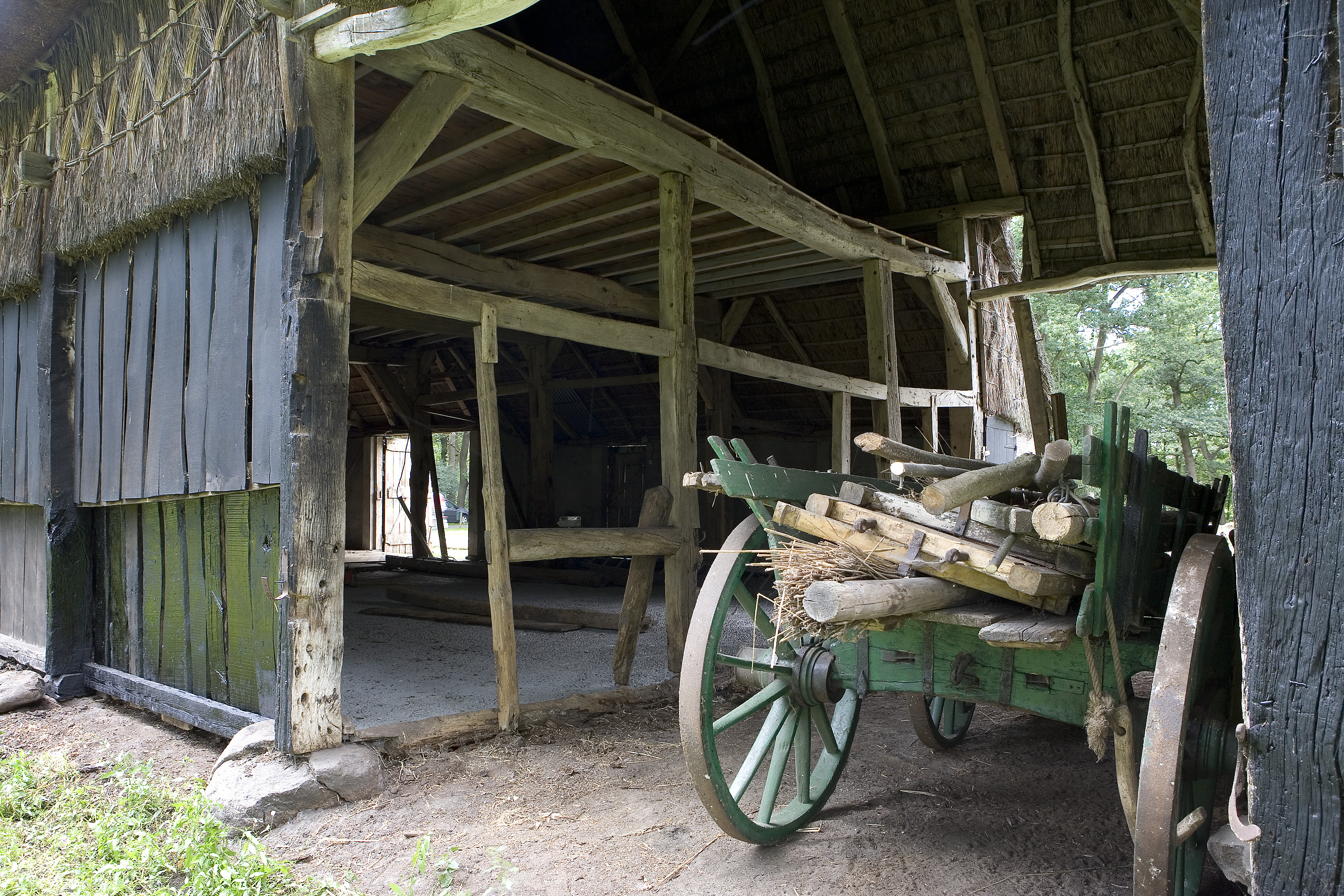
An unusual barn in Schoonebeek, Netherlands, with interrupted sills; the posts land directly on the padstone foundation

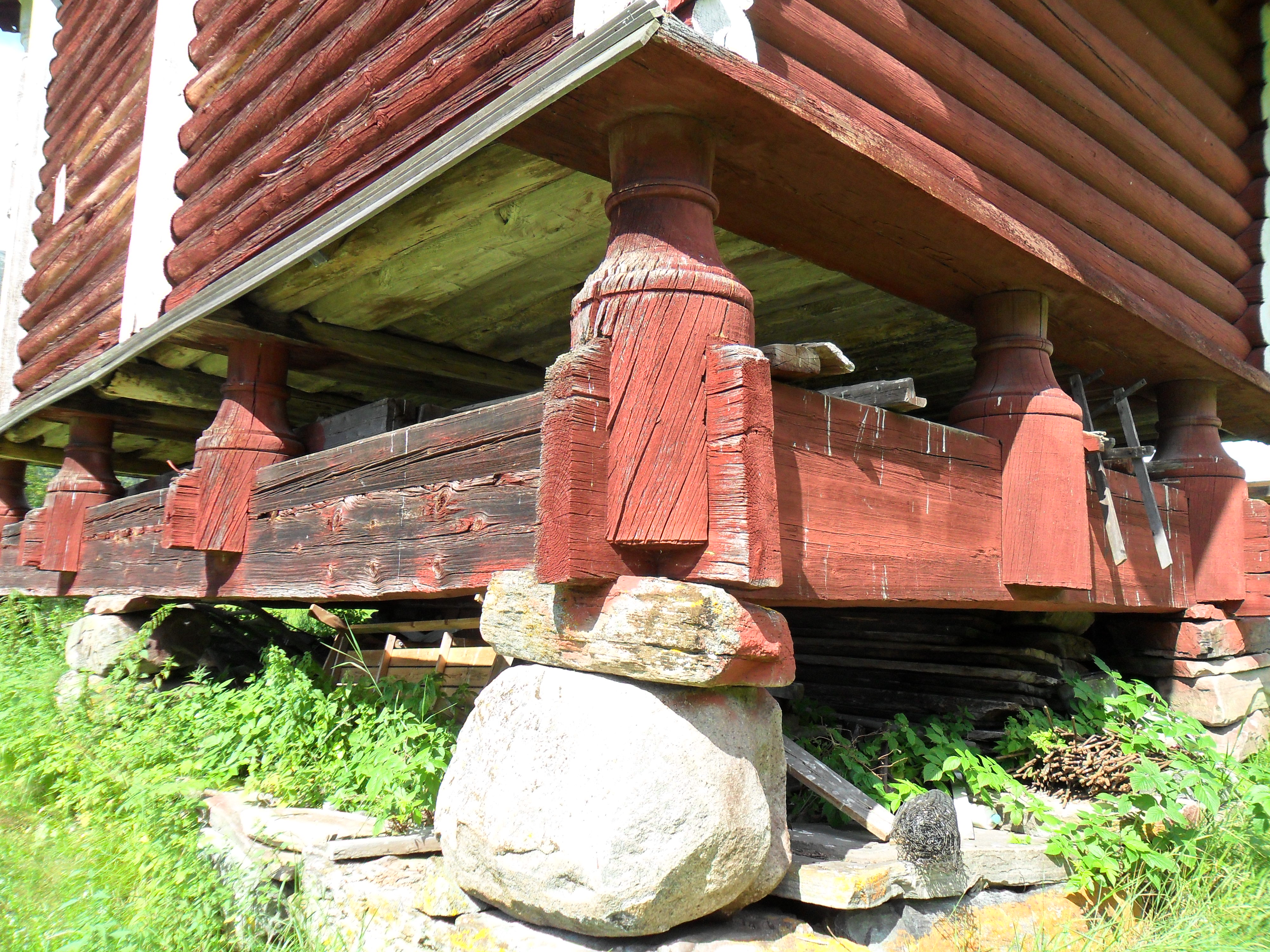
Norwegian style framing, Kravik Mellom, Norway

In historic buildings the sills were almost always large, solid timbers framed together at the corners, carry the bents, and are set on the stone or brick foundation walls, piers, or piles (wood posts driven or set into the ground). The sill typically carries the wall framing (posts and studs) and floor joists.

There are rare examples of historic buildings in the U.S. where the floor joists land on the foundation and a plank sill or timber sill sits on top of the joists. Another rare, historic building technique is for the posts of a timber-frame building to land directly on a foundation or in the ground and the sills fit between the posts and are called interrupted sills.

== Stick framing ==
In modern wood construction, sills usually come in sizes of 2×4, 2×6, 2×8, and 2×10. In stick framing, the sill is made of treated lumber, and is anchored to the foundation wall, often with J-bolts, to keep the building from coming off the foundation during a severe storm or earthquake. Building codes require that the bottom of the sill plate be kept 6 to 8 inches above the finished grade, to hinder termites, and to prevent the sill plate from rotting.

== Automobiles ==
In automobiles, the sill plate is located underneath the door and sometimes displays the make or model of the vehicle.

== Naval architecture ==
In naval architecture, sill also refers to the lower horizontal plate (frame) height, above which doors and access opening are fixed.
