= Hersey, Michigan =

- Village
- Village of Hersey
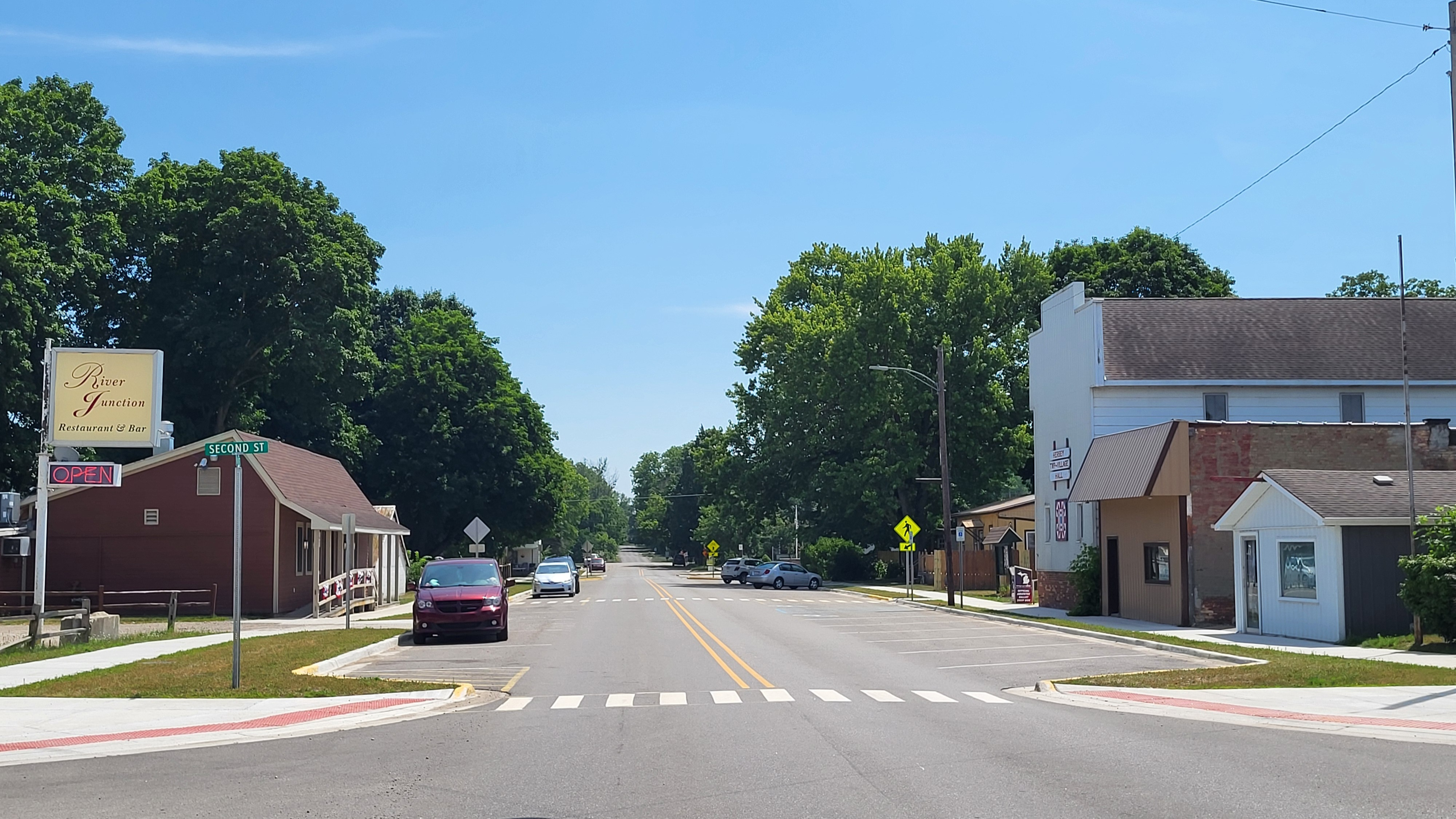
- Looking south along Main Street

- Location within Osceola County

- Location within the state of Michigan Location within the United States
- Coordinates: 43°51′05″N 85°26′31″W
- Country: United States
- State: Michigan
- County: Osceola
- Township: Hersey
- Settled: 1851
- Incorporated: 1875

Government
  - Type: Village council
  - President: Karen Huisman
  - Clerk: Lori Anderson

Area
  - Total: 1.10 sq mi (2.85 km^{2})
  - Land: 1.10 sq mi (2.85 km^{2})
  - Water: 0 sq mi (0.00 km^{2})
- Elevation: 974 ft (297 m)

Population (2020)
  - Total: 347
  - Density: 315.5/sq mi (121.83/km^{2})
- Time zone: UTC-5 (Eastern (EST))
  - Summer (DST): UTC-4 (EDT)
- ZIP code(s): 49639
- Area code: 231
- FIPS code: 26-37820
- GNIS feature ID: 2398495

Hersey is a village in Osceola County in the U.S. state of Michigan. The population was 347 at the 2020 census. The village is located within Hersey Township.

== History ==
Hersey is a small rural community that started as a lumber town in the early 19th century and was a major supplier of lumber to the Muskegon Lumber Yards and played an important role in rebuilding Chicago after the great fire. It was founded by Delos A. Blodgett, a banker, lumber baron, and philanthropist. His family was a major benefactor in the Grand Rapids area via the Blodgett Hospital and the Grand Rapids Home for Kids.

== Geography ==
According to the United States Census Bureau, the village has a total area of 1.10 square miles (2.85 km^{2}), all land.

The Hersey River empties into the Muskegon River at Hersey.

== Demographics ==
Historical population
Census	Pop.	Note	%±
1880	472		—
1890	328		−30.5%
1900	327		−0.3%
1910	310		−5.2%
1920	284		−8.4%
1930	279		−1.8%
1940	202		−27.6%
1950	239		18.3%
1960	246		2.9%
1970	276		12.2%
1980	364		31.9%
1990	354		−2.7%
2000	374		5.6%
2010	350		−6.4%
2020	347		−0.9%
U.S. Decennial Census

=== 2010 census ===
As of the census of 2010, there were 350 people, 137 households, and 94 families living in the village. The population density was 318.2 inhabitants per square mile (122.9/km^{2}). There were 165 housing units at an average density of 150.0 per square mile (57.9/km^{2}). The racial makeup of the village was 96.6% White, 0.3% African American, 0.3% Native American, 1.1% from other races, and 1.7% from two or more races. Hispanic or Latino of any race were 2.6% of the population.

There were 137 households, of which 35.8% had children under the age of 18 living with them, 52.6% were married couples living together, 10.9% had a female householder with no husband present, 5.1% had a male householder with no wife present, and 31.4% were non-families. 20.4% of all households were made up of individuals, and 5.9% had someone living alone who was 65 years of age or older. The average household size was 2.55 and the average family size was 2.98.

The median age in the village was 40.3 years. 26.3% of residents were under the age of 18; 7.7% were between the ages of 18 and 24; 26.3% were from 25 to 44; 25.4% were from 45 to 64; and 14.3% were 65 years of age or older. The gender makeup of the village was 50.0% male and 50.0% female.

=== 2000 census ===
As of the census of 2000, there were 374 people, 139 households, and 97 families living in the village. The population density was 343.4 inhabitants per square mile (132.6/km^{2}). There were 169 housing units at an average density of 155.2 per square mile (59.9/km^{2}). The racial makeup of the village was 97.59% White, 0.53% Native American, 0.80% Asian, and 1.07% from two or more races. Hispanic or Latino of any race were 0.53% of the population.

There were 139 households, out of which 28.8% had children under the age of 18 living with them, 54.7% were married couples living together, 8.6% had a female householder with no husband present, and 30.2% were non-families. 24.5% of all households were made up of individuals, and 10.1% had someone living alone who was 65 years of age or older. The average household size was 2.69 and the average family size was 3.12.

In the village, the population was spread out, with 25.7% under the age of 18, 9.6% from 18 to 24, 31.0% from 25 to 44, 22.2% from 45 to 64, and 11.5% who were 65 years of age or older. The median age was 34 years. For every 100 females, there were 105.5 males. For every 100 females age 18 and over, there were 98.6 males.

The median income for a household in the village was $38,929, and the median income for a family was $46,000. Males had a median income of $25,694 versus $19,375 for females. The per capita income for the village was $15,584. About 8.8% of families and 12.8% of the population were below the poverty line, including 20.9% of those under age 18 and 22.6% of those age 65 or over.

== Images ==
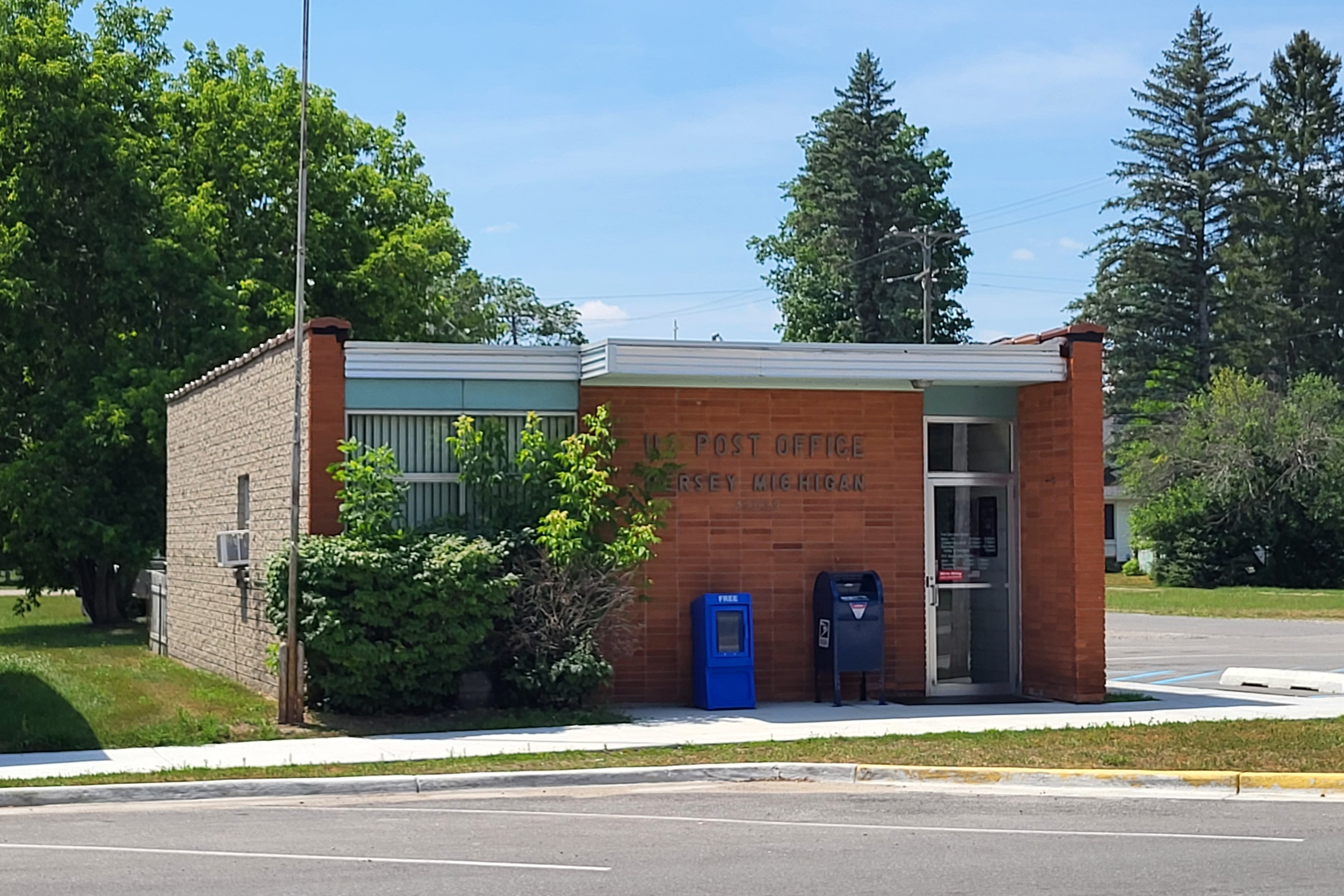
U.S. Post Office in Hersey

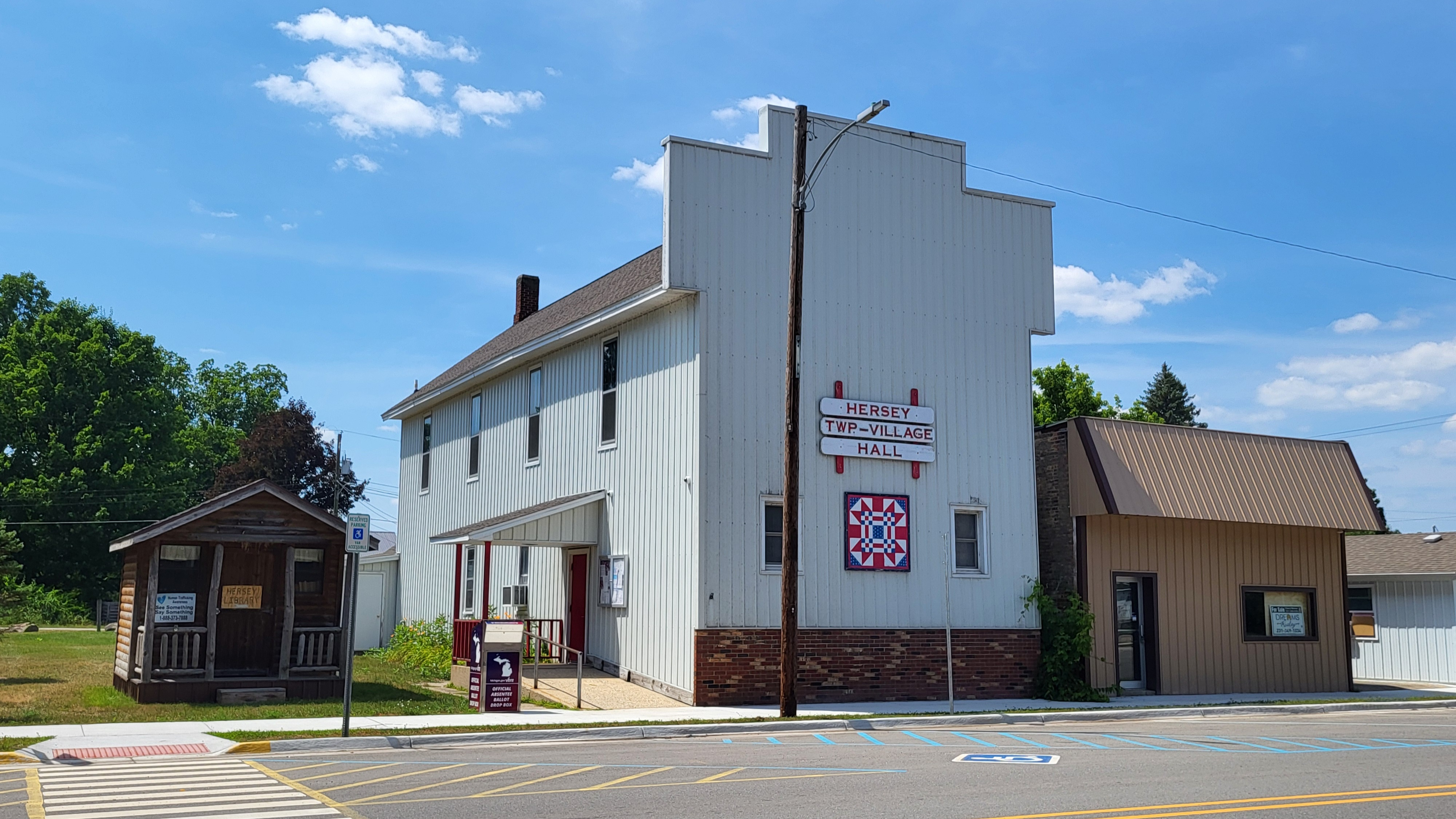
Hersey village and township hall

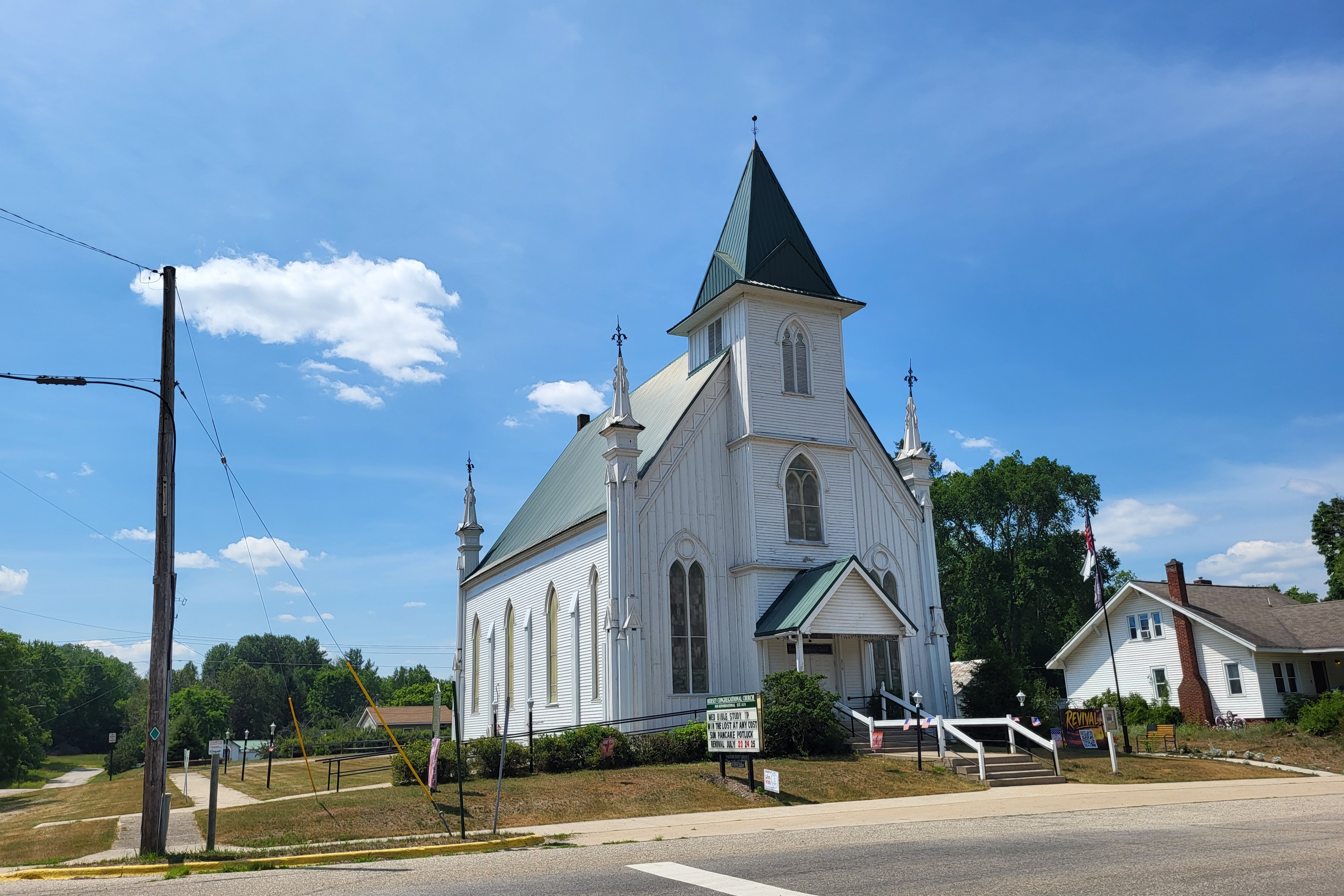
Historic Congregational Church
