= John W. Blodgett =

American lumberman and civic leader (1860–1951)

John Wood Blodgett
- Born: July 26, 1860; Hersey, Michigan
- Died: November 21, 1951 (aged 91); Grand Rapids, Michigan
- Education: Highland Military Academy, Worcester, Mass.
- Occupation: Federal Reserve Bank of Chicago Director
- Political party: Republican
- Spouse: Minnie Cumnock Blodgett married 1895 until her death 1931
- Children: John Wood Blodgett Jr. (1901 - 1987); Kathrine Cumnock Blodgett Hadley (January 13, 1898 - August 11, 1980 (aged 82))
- Parents: Delos A. Blodgett; Jennie S. Wood

John Wood Blodgett Sr. (1860–1951) was a lumberman, civic leader, and philanthropist. He was born on a frontier farm where the present village of Hersey, Michigan, now sits, to logging and sawmill operation owner Delos A. and Jane Wood Blodgett.

== Education ==
John's father built a school for the settlement where he received his early education, then attended Todd Seminary, Woodstock, Illinois, and Military Academy in Worcester, Massachusetts, graduating in 1876. Although he expected to attend college, his father's illness directed John into the family's pine-logging and milling interests, quickly learning the trade.

== National Lumber Manufacturers Association ==
Blodgett was president of the National Lumber Manufacturers Association in 1922, 1923, and 1930. He was the first chairman of the American Lumber Standard Committee when it was created in 1922.

== Blodgett family archive ==
According to the Finding aid for Blodgett Family papers, 1872–1953 abstract at Bentley Historical Library within the University of Michigan Digital Library, the family archive contains:

Family of Delos A. Blodgett, his son John W. Blodgett, and his grandson John W. Blodgett Jr., residents of Grand Rapids, Michigan and owners of a series of logging companies active in Michigan, Mississippi, California, Oregon, and Vancouver Island. Correspondence, journals, cash books, ledgers, and maps of family businesses, including the Blodgett Company, Wright-Blodgett Company, Michigan-California Lumber Company, Michigan Timber Company, Hill-Davis Company, and Tidewater Timber Company; also personal correspondence and photographs.

Blodgett's consolidation of three banks during the depression protected many of his clients' homes and account balances. The product of that consolidation was the American Home Security Bank. He and his wife, Minnie, were quite the philanthropists, noted for the Blodgett Memorial Hospital, the Clinic for Infant Feeding, Vassar College's Minnie Cumnock Blodgett Hall of Euthenics, The Association for the Blind, among many others.
