= Lydia Blodgett Three-Decker =

- U.S. National Register of Historic Places
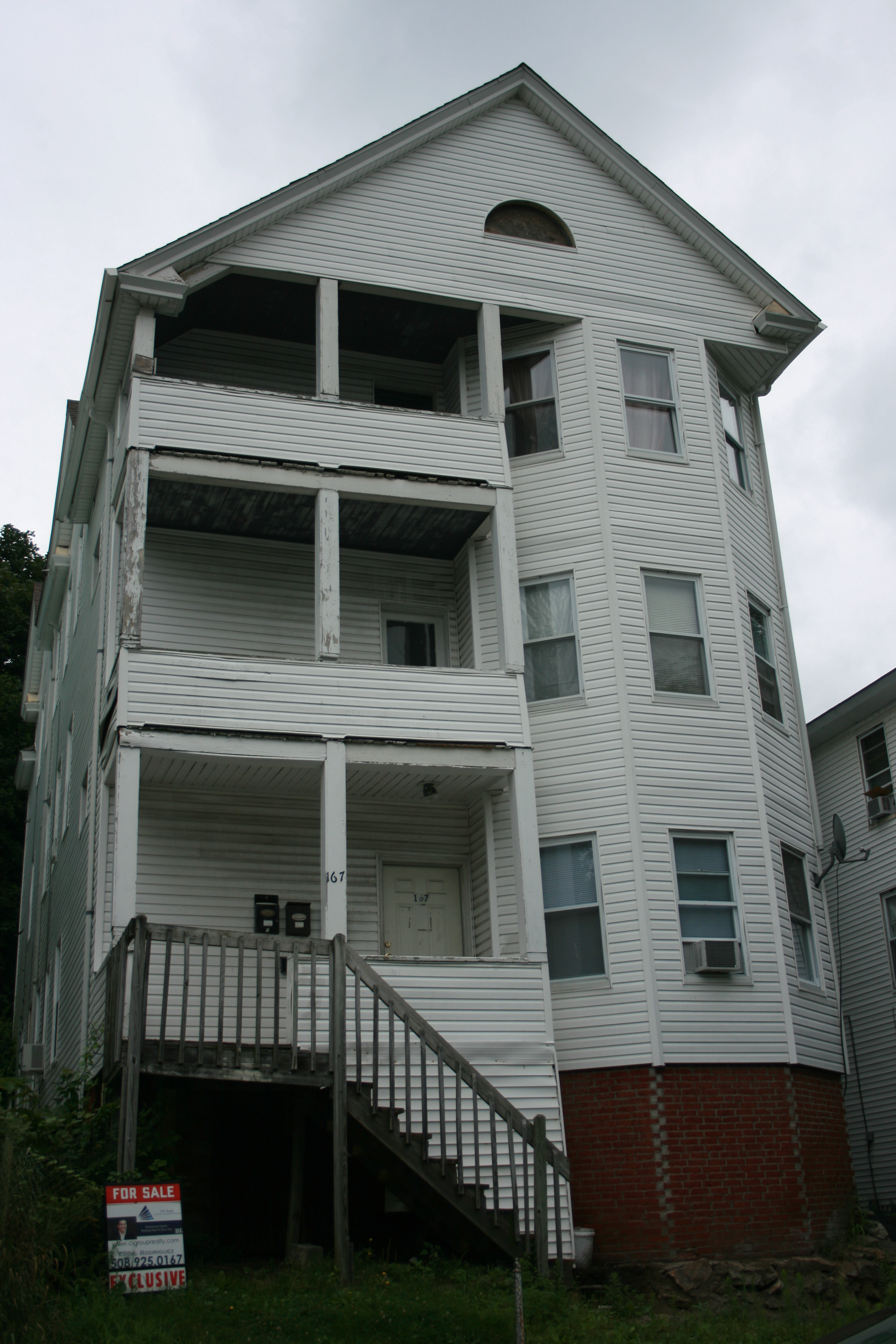

- Location within Massachusetts Location within the United States
- Location: 167 Eastern Ave., Worcester, Massachusetts
- Coordinates: 42°16′29″N 71°47′18″W
- Area: less than one acre
- Built: 1902
- Architectural style: Queen Anne
- MPS: Worcester Three-Deckers TR
- NRHP reference No.: 89002417
- Added to NRHP: February 9, 1990

The Lydie Blodgett Three-Decker is a historic triple decker in Worcester, Massachusetts. Built in 1902, it was listed on the National Register of Historic Places in 1990 as a good example of a Queen Anne triple decker. Many of its details have been removed or obscured by later exterior siding replacement and porch reconstruction (see photo).

== Description and history ==
The Lydia Blodgett Three-Decker is located on Worcester's Belmont Hill, a residential area east of its downtown, and stands on the east side of Eastern Avenue, between Vinson and Catharine Streets. It is a three-story wood-frame structure, set on a high brick foundation and covered by a gabled roof. When the building was listed on the National Register of Historic Places in 1990, it was called out for its well-preserved Queen Anne styling, including its porch with Tuscan columns, and brackets in the roof corners near projecting bays, but these features have been compromised or lost by subsequent alterations. The left side of the gable roof extends lower than the right side, and there is a half-round louver in the gable end.

The house was built about 1902, when Belmont Hill was undergoing a building boom. The neighborhood was heavily populated with Scandinavian immigrants, mainly from Sweden and Finland. The house's first documented owners were the heirs of Lydia Blodgett, who also owned two other buildings nearby. Early residents included workers at Worcester's manufacturing businesses, as well as a painter and a coachman. August Westbom, a dry goods merchant who was an early resident, eventually bought the building, continuing to occupy it into the 1930s.

== See also ==
- National Register of Historic Places listings in eastern Worcester, Massachusetts
