= Ashton, Michigan =

- Unincorporated community
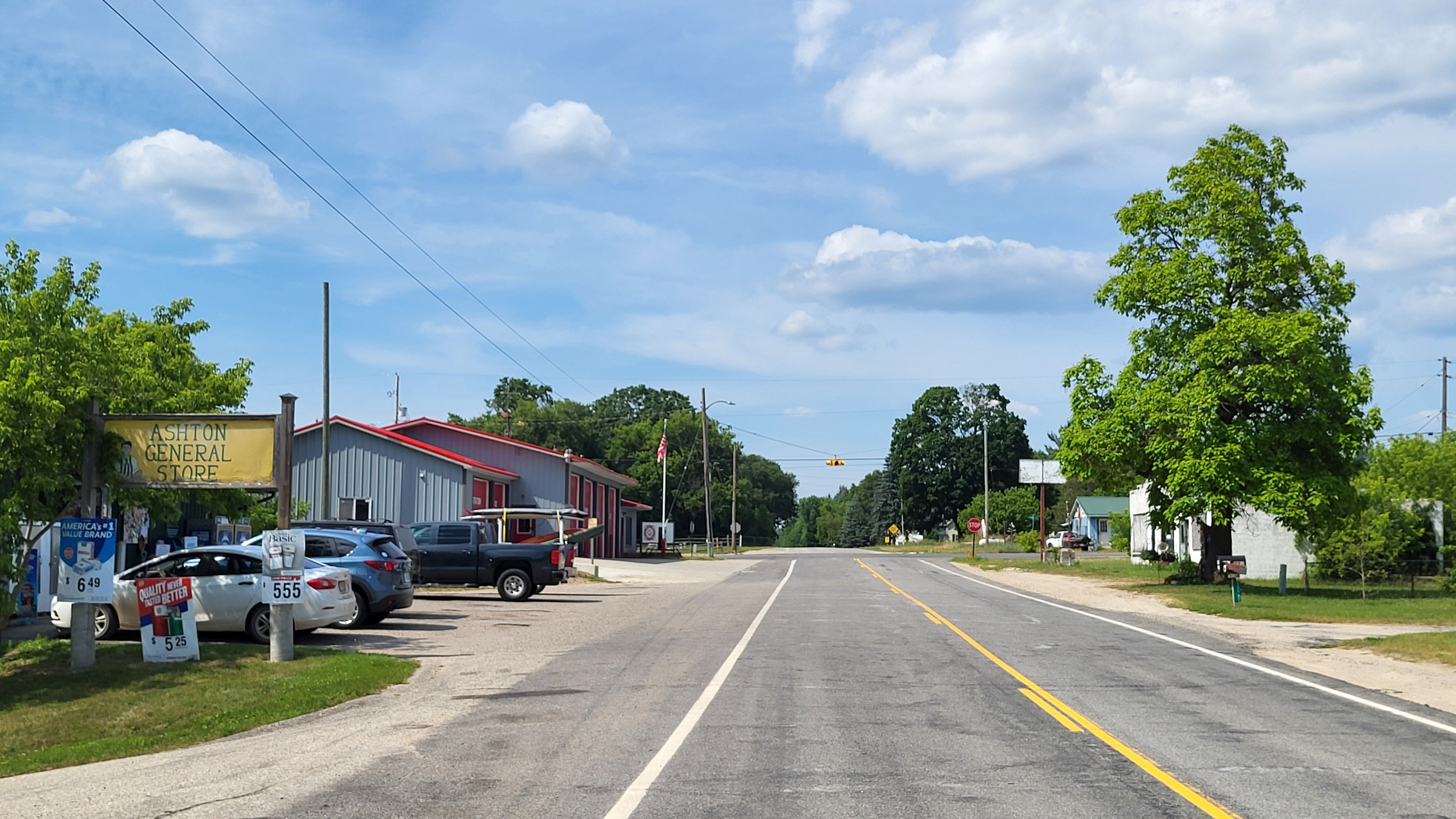
- Looking north along 210th Avenue

- Location within the state of Michigan Location within the United States
- Coordinates: 43°58′23″N 85°30′13″W
- Country: United States
- State: Michigan
- County: Osceola
- Township: Lincoln
- Settled: 1868
- Elevation: 1,171 ft (357 m)
- Time zone: UTC-5 (Eastern (EST))
  - Summer (DST): UTC-4 (EDT)
- ZIP code(s): 49655 (LeRoy); 49677 (Reed City)
- Area code: 231
- GNIS feature ID: 620279

Ashton is an unincorporated community in Osceola County in the U.S. state of Michigan. The community is located within Lincoln Township just east of US Highway 131 (US 131). As an unincorporated community, Ashton has no legally defined boundaries or population statistics of its own.

== Geography ==
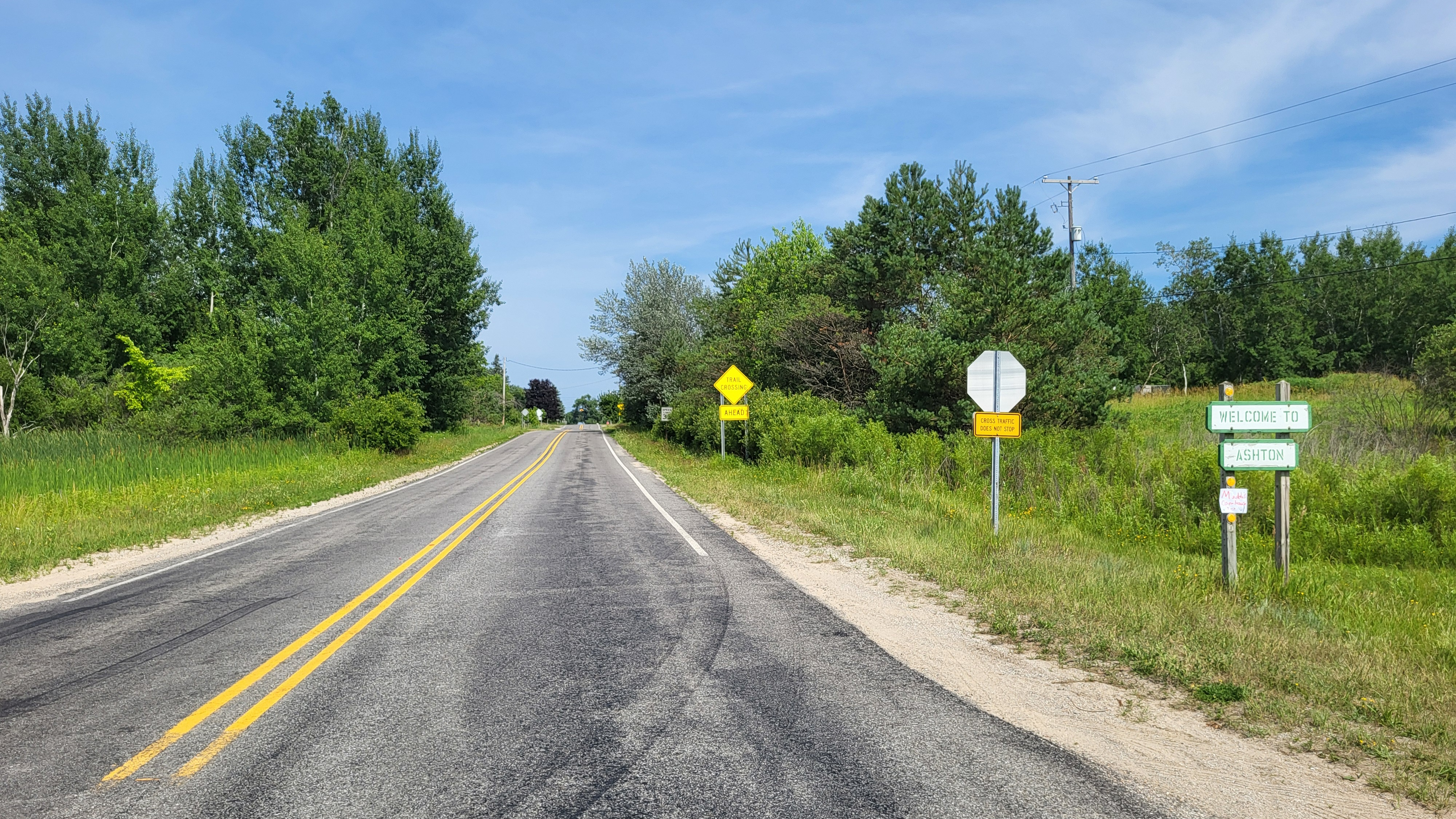
Road signage along 11 Mile Road

Ashton is a rural community in Lincoln Township in western Osceola County. The community is centered just east of US 131 and is directly accessible via 11 Mile Road exit 159. Another major roadway through the community is the Mackinaw Trail (known locally as 210th Avenue), which is a route that was previously part of the original US 131. At times referred to as Old US 131, it connects from Reed City to Petoskey. Ashton sits at an elevation of 1,171 feet (357 m) above sea level.

Other nearby unincorporated communities include Orono to the south, Slaybaugh Corner to the southeast, and Edgetts to the northwest. The nearest incorporated municipalities are the village of LeRoy about 6.0 miles (9.7 km) to the northeast and the city of Reed City an equal distance to the south. The East Branch Hersey Creek, which is a tributary of the Hersey River, flows to the south and east of the community.

The Fred Meijer White Pine Trail State Park is a 92-mile-long (148 km) rail trail that runs directly through Ashton. The community has a trailhead along 11 Mile Road but no amenities at this point, and the next trailheads are in Reed City to the south and LeRoy to the north. Ashton is served primarily by Pine River Area Schools to the north in LeRoy Township. The Lincoln Township Fire Department is located in the center of the community at 10981 210th Avenue. Ashton no longer contains its own post office and is now served primarily by the Reed City 49677 ZIP Code, while areas to the north may be served by the LeRoy 49655 ZIP Code.

== History ==
Historic image of the former train station

This area of Osceola County was first settled by Joseph W. Ash as early as November 1868 when the Grand Rapids and Indiana Railroad built a rail line through the remote area of Lincoln Township, which itself was formally organized a year earlier. The community received a post office under the name Bates on January 17, 1870. Matthias L. Swan served as the first postmaster. The railway line was completed and in full operation by late 1871, and a rail depot was built in the community of Bates. When Ash platted the community, the post office was renamed to Ashton on January 11, 1872. The community was located about five miles (8.0 km) south of LeRoy, which was also settled along the railway around the same time.

Another early prominent settler was Frayer Halladay, who opened one of the area's first general stores in the community in 1870. His market was very successful, and Halladay would also later serve as the Ashton postmaster. The same year, a Methodist Episcopal congregation was established by Reverend Deal, who began preaching sermons around the township. Anna Howard Shaw was encouraged by the congregation to give her first sermon here but kept the planning process mostly secret from some friends and family in fear of being shunned, as women preachers were very uncommon at the time. Her sister traveled with her by train to Ashton but was very distraught at Anna's decision to conduct a sermon. When she arrived, there was no church building, and she instead gave her sermon to a very small and curious crowd at the local schoolhouse. She soon left Ashton, as she was pressured to abandon her preaching and move back south to attend Albion College instead.

By 1872, Ashton developed quickly and recorded a population of 100 permanent residents. The community grew to include three sawmills, a shingle mill, two general stores, restaurant, and saloon, among other businesses. By 1877, Ashton had around 125 residents. In 1882, the Methodist Episcopal Church was built in Ashton, and the congregation consisted of 25 members. A Baptist congregation was established in 1884 and used the schoolhouse for its services. By this time, Ashton also contained several stores, a blacksmith, two sawmills, two hotels, two doctors, and a population of 180. The community sustained as a small lumber settlement and peaked at 190 residents by 1910.

=== Recent history ===
In 1919, the main roadway through the area was designated as M-13, which was among the state's first highways in the newly instituted state highway system. M-13 ran from the state line with Indiana as far north as Harbor Springs. In November 1926, the M-13 designation was replaced by the newly commissioned US 131, which ran along the same route at this point through Ashton. In 1957, the US 131 route designation through Ashton was diverted slightly west into a larger newly-constructed freeway route, while Ashton would receive direct access to this new freeway via exit 159 (11 Mile Road). The original roadway was turned over to local control and is colloquially called "Old US 131" as part of the Mackinaw Trail, which runs from Reed City slightly to the south of Ashton to Petoskey further to the north. Locally, this roadway is known as 210th Avenue.

Later in his life, composer and preacher George Bennard moved to Ashton upon retiring around 1944. He is most known for writing the hymn "The Old Rugged Cross" (1912) and a literal cross bearing that title is located along 210th Avenue just south of Ashton. Frayer Halladay Park is a small memorial park located in the center of the community and named in honor of the early settler. Anna Howard Shaw has a monument within the park, which was erected in 1929. There is also another monument dedicated to an unknown Civil War soldier who resided in Osceola County and died during the war.

The original Grand Rapids and Indiana Railroad line through Ashton was purchased by the Pennsylvania Railroad around 1918 and continued regular commercial and passenger service. However, the lumber industry and train passengers declined, as did the community itself. The Ashton post office closed in 1956. Train service ended by 1961, and the depot was demolished. The unused lines were now under the ownership of the state. The rail lines along the entire route were eventually removed by 1994, and the former path was converted into the Fred Meijer White Pine Trail State Park, which is now a multi-use rail trail that has a small trailhead within the community of Ashton.

The original Methodist Episcopal Church located at 20862 11 Mile Road ceased operation in December 2024.

== Notable people ==
- Anna Howard Shaw, women's suffrage advocate and Methodist minister, gave sermons in Ashton
- George Bennard, composer and preacher, lived in Ashton during his later life.

== Images ==
White Pine Trail trailhead

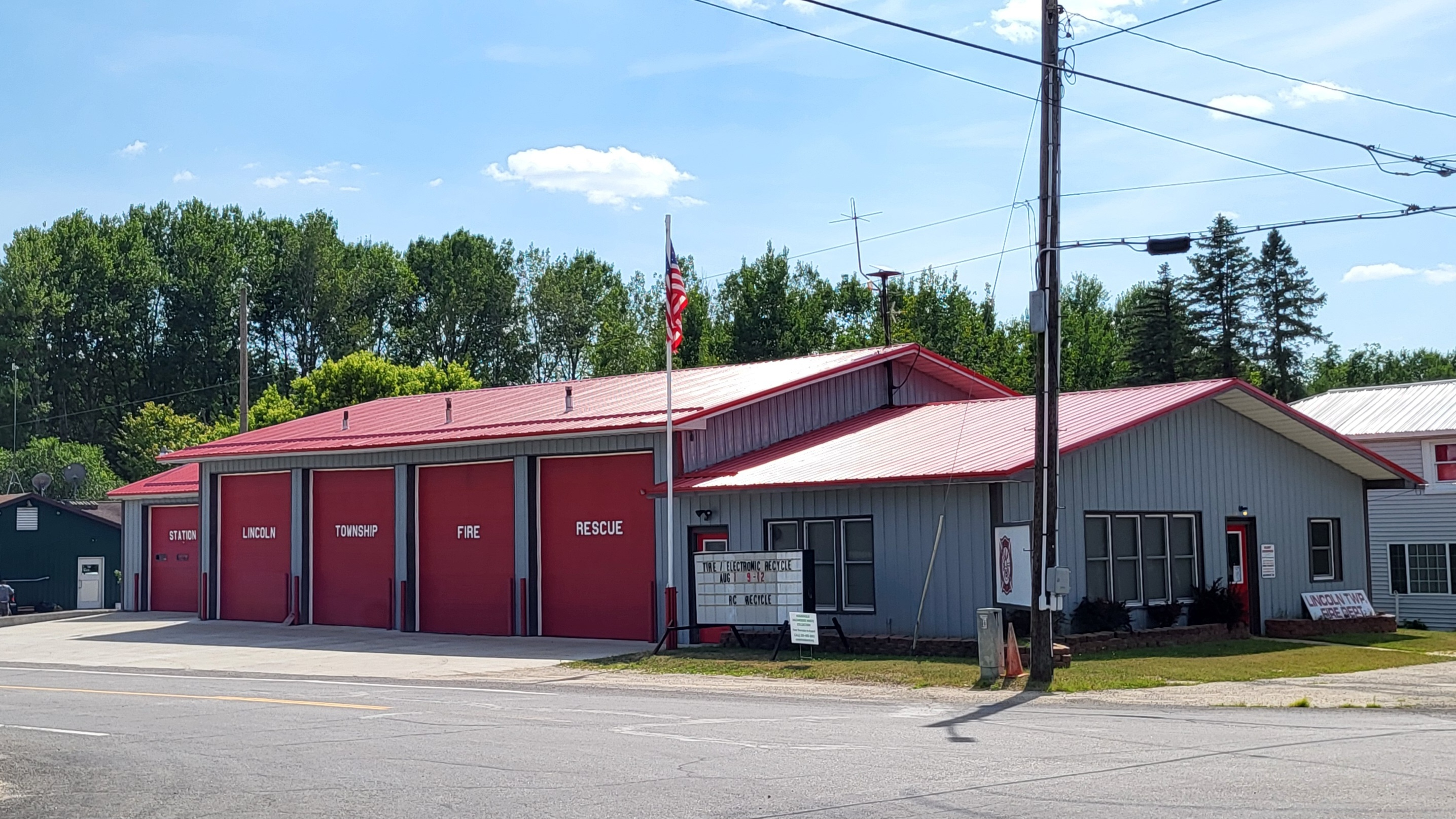
Lincoln Township fire department

Frayer Halladay Park
