= Dwelling in Beulah Land =

1911 hymn by C. Austin Miles, formerly used as the Fijian national anthem

- by C. Austin Miles
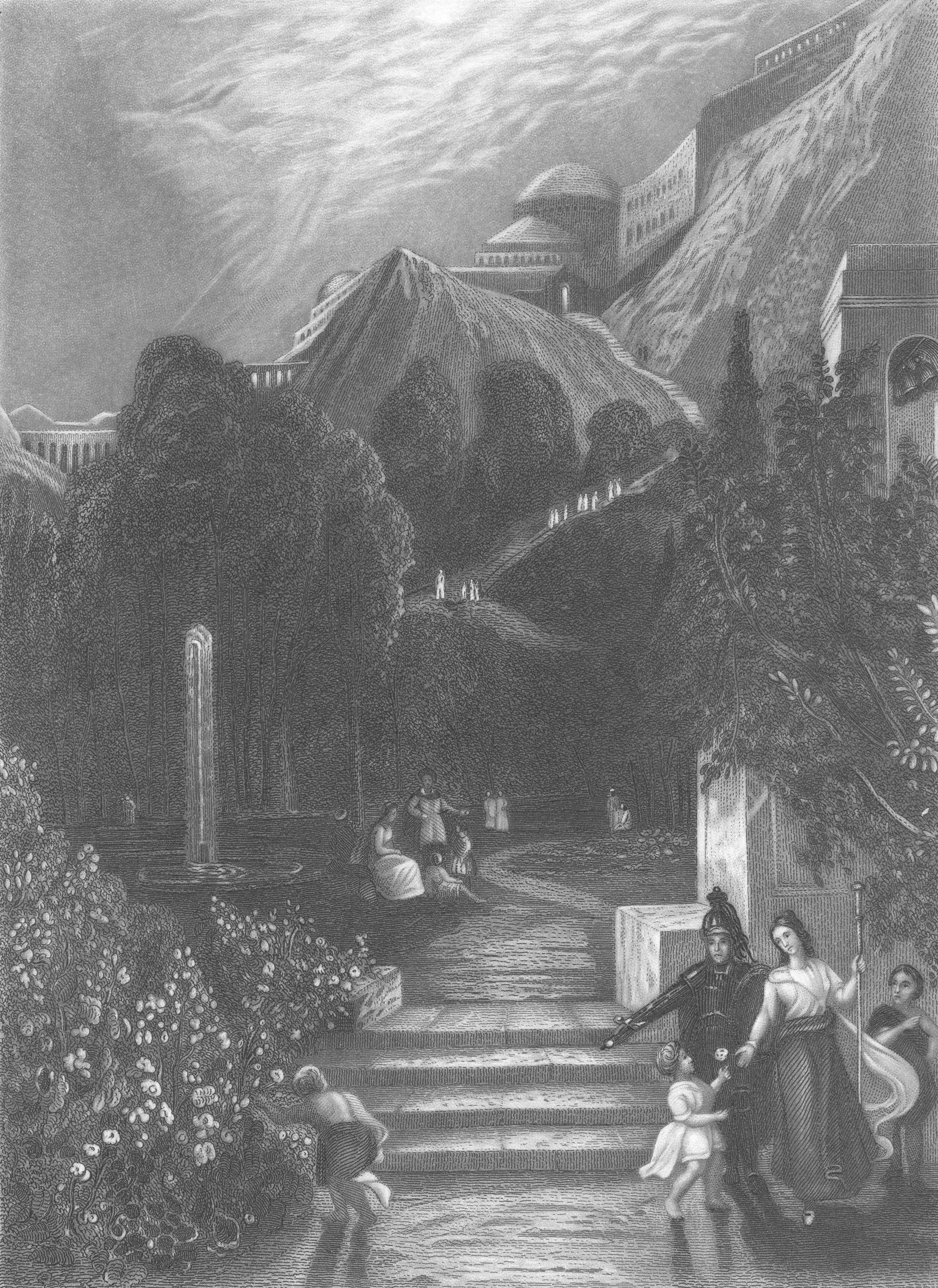
- "The Land of Beulah" (1874) by H. Melville
- Genre: Hymn
- Written: 1911
- Based on: Isaiah 62:4
- Meter: 14.13.14.10 with refrain
- Fijian anthem, performed by the U.S. Navy Band, whose melody is the same as Dwelling in Beulah Land.

Dwelling in Beulah Land is a hymn written and composed by C. Austin Miles who also wrote and composed "In the Garden". The song was published in 1911. It was used as the Fijian anthem.
