= Milton, Michigan =

Milton, Michigan may refer to:

- Milton, Macomb County, Michigan, an unincorporated community
- Milton Township, Antrim County, Michigan
- Milton Township, Cass County, Michigan
- Milton Junction, a railroad station in Lincoln Township, Osceola County, Michigan
- Milton, a copper mine in Ontonagon County, Michigan
