= Homer Rodeheaver =

American songwriter

Homer Rodeheaver, circa 1912

Homer Alvan Rodeheaver (October 4, 1880 – December 18, 1955) was an American evangelist, music director, music publisher, composer of gospel songs, and pioneer in the recording of sacred music.

== Early career ==
Born in Cinco Hollow in Hocking County, Ohio, he was taken as a child to Jellico in eastern Tennessee, and worked there with his father in the lumber mill business. Although he learned the mountain ballads, he preferred Negro spirituals, because they emphasized harmony and rhythm and had a "definite religious purpose". Rodeheaver early learned to play the cornet, but switched to trombone while attending Ohio Wesleyan College, where he also served as a cheerleader.

In 1898, he left college to serve in the Fourth Tennessee Band during the Spanish–American War. Around 1904, he joined evangelist W. E. Biederwolf as music director and then served, from 1910 to 1930, in the same role for Billy Sunday, the most popular evangelist of the period. Shortly after Billy Sunday's death in 1935, Rodeheaver wrote a memoir of his relationship with the evangelist.

== Music director for Billy Sunday ==
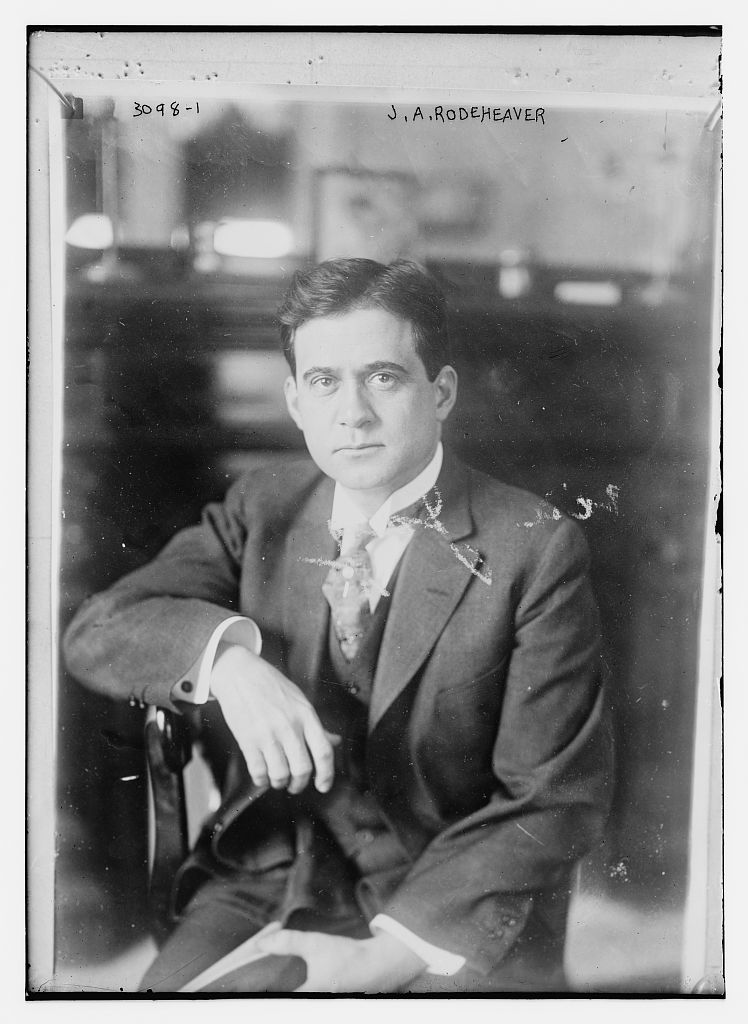
Homer Rodeheaver, circa 1910–1915

Rodeheaver—called "Rody" by associates and reporters alike—had a genial, extroverted personality. Although he was not ignorant or unappreciative of classical and traditional sacred music, Rodeheaver enjoyed and promoted lively new gospel songs among Sunday's congregations. Rodeheaver was a natural showman, who could warm his audience with jokes and direct choirs and congregations with his trombone. For instance, he would say that his instrument was a "Methodist trombone" that would occasionally "backslide", or he would pull his lips from the mouthpiece and say, "Just imagine! I'm being paid just to do this!"

When Lowell Thomas presented Rodeheaver to the New York Advertising Club, Rodeheaver succeeded in getting the advertising agents to sing "Pray the Clouds Away". Will Rogers said, "Rody is the fellow that can make you sing whether you want to or not. I think he has more terrible voices in what was supposed to be unison than any man in the world. Everyone sings for Rody!" When Rodeheaver was introduced to John D. Rockefeller Sr., on a golf course, Rockefeller delayed his golf game long enough to sing with Rodeheaver, "I'll Go Where You Want Me to Go, Dear Lord." In 1940, Rodeheaver led the singing for 250,000 people who attended the Wendell Willkie homecoming in Elwood, Indiana.

In the days before electronic amplification, Rodeheaver quickly discovered that his trombone could be heard when his voice or the piano could not. He often led congregational singing with his trombone, switching from playing to directing halfway through the song, and then allowing the trombone to hang on his arm at the elbow. During a Sunday tent campaign in Kansas, a heavy storm with near-hurricane winds caused the tent top and sides to sag, and a quarter pole fell, striking a woman on the head. When the crowd panicked and rose to flee, Rodeheaver began playing his trombone and the crowd quieted.

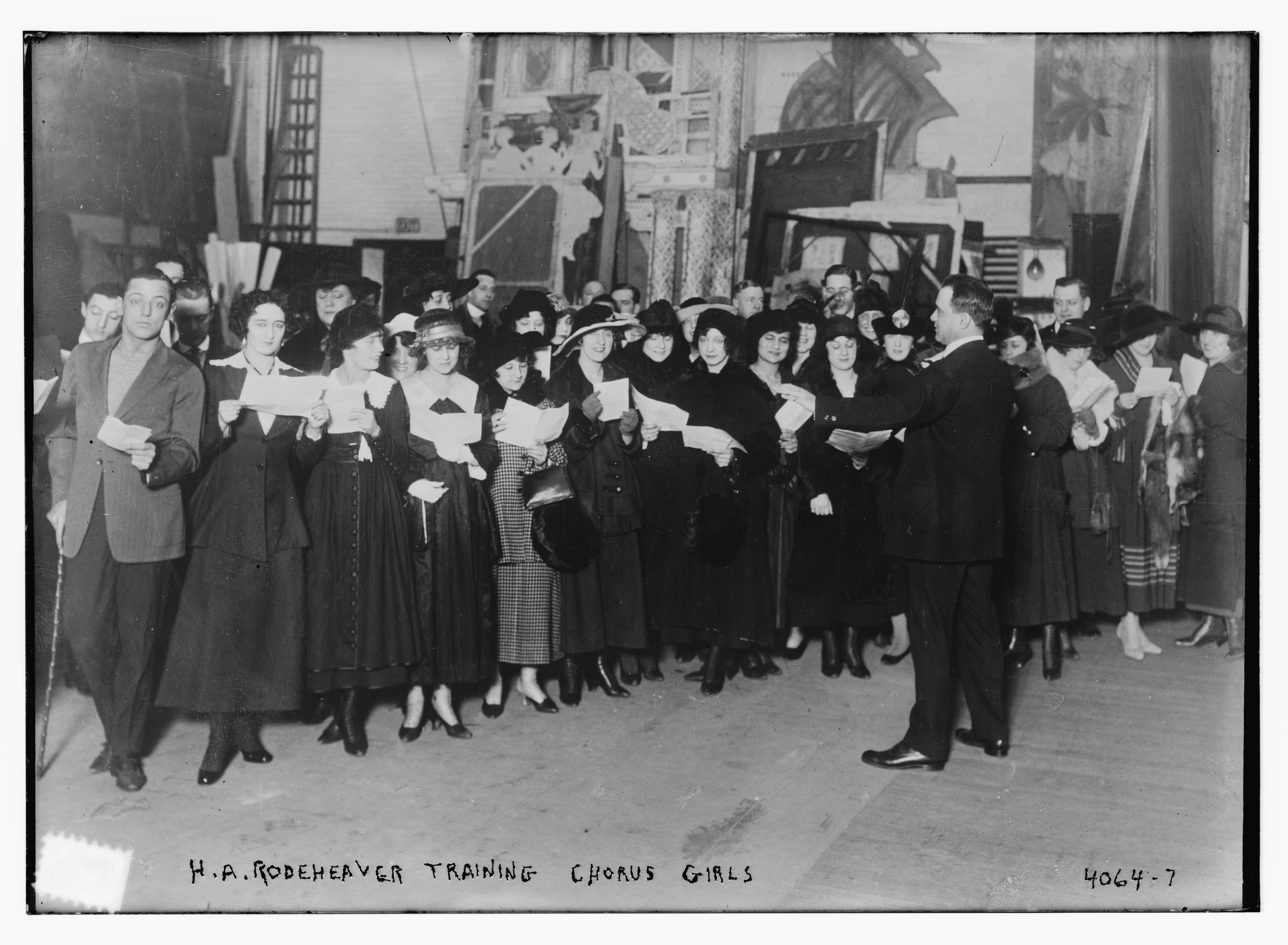
"H. A. Rodeheaver training chorus girls"

In his prime, Rodeheaver also used his baritone voice to good effect as a soloist and as a participant in ensembles composed of other members of Sunday's evangelistic team—especially duets with contralto Virginia Asher. During the heyday of Sunday's evangelistic campaigns, Rodeheaver directed the nation's largest choruses, from a few hundred to as many as 2000 volunteers in Sunday's various campaigns. To him, nothing was incongruous about having his choirs sing Horatio R. Palmer's gospel song "Master, the Tempest Is Raging", followed by the Hallelujah Chorus from Handel's Messiah.

== Recording career ==
Temperance movement song, "Molly and the baby, Don't you know", sung by Homer Rodeheaver, 1916

In 1913, Rodeheaver began recording for the Victor Talking Machine Company, a relationship that lasted for 20 years. He also recorded for Gennett, Columbia, and his own Rainbow Records label. Some of his records, such as "The Unclouded Day" and "The Great Judgment Morning", were so popular that they had to be rerecorded to keep up with demand. Other records featured Rodeheaver's recitations of sentimental poetry, such as Paul Laurence Dunbar's "When Malindy Sings" (1916).

Rodeheaver appeared on at least 18 record labels and 500 sides during his recording career. His most recorded piece was Sunday's theme song "Brighten the Corner Where You Are", which Rodeheaver recorded for at least 17 different labels. Rodeheaver's other most-recorded titles were "Mother's Prayers Have Followed Me", "If Your Heart Keeps Right", "The Old Rugged Cross", "Since Jesus Came into My Heart", "In the Garden", and "My Wonderful Dream".

== Music publisher ==
In 1910, Rodeheaver started his own publishing business, the Rodeheaver Company, compiling gospel songs to sell at revivals. In 1936, Rodeheaver purchased the Hall-Mack Company and merged it with his own publishing house, headquartered in Winona Lake, Indiana. Rodeheaver employed songwriters such as B. D. Ackley and Charles H. Gabriel to write songs for his company, but he also composed a number of tunes himself, including most notably, "When Jesus Came". Around 1922, his company began issuing 78-rpm records on its own Rainbow label, the nation's first record company devoted solely to gospel music. The Rodeheaver Company was acquired by Word Music in 1969.

Billy Sunday perhaps paid Rodeheaver $80,000–90,000 over the course of their 20-year partnership, but Rodeheaver admitted that he made more than four times that amount from other sources, especially music publishing, during those same years.

== Personal life ==
Rodeheaver founded Rainbow Ranch, later renamed Rodeheaver Boy's Ranch, a home for abused and abandoned boys in Palatka, Florida, and visited it often, singing and playing the guitar for the boys. He created and subsidized the Rodeheaver School of Music at the Winona Lake Bible Conference, Indiana, a two-week-a-summer seminar to stimulate laymen to develop their musical abilities for their local churches. Rodeheaver traveled around the world on mission trips, and at the Dead Sea, while floating in the brine, he played "Brighten the Corner" on his trombone. Introduced to the Moravian custom of an Easter sunrise service, Rodeheaver helped popularize the concept across the United States.

In 1912, Rodeheaver bought an old farm house on "Rainbow Point" at Winona Lake, Indiana, and had it rebuilt to look like a ship, including adding a railing around its flat roof. There, he entertained hosts of preachers, businessmen, opera singers, and radio personalities, sometimes as many as 20 at a time. His business cards, living room rug, and bathroom towels featured rainbows, a reference to a line of a frequent theme song, "Every cloud will wear a rainbow/If your heart keeps right."

Rodeheaver never married, though he "had a few very close brushes with matrimony" and even proposed to Canadian-American evangelist Aimee Semple McPherson, who turned him down. His half-sister Ruth and her husband, Jim Thomas, lived with him and served as his hostess. Rodeheaver "loved to be surrounded by women of charm and beauty, and with them his manner was always extremely gallant". Mary Gaston Jones, the wife of evangelist Bob Jones, Sr., once said of Rodeheaver, "Here comes Homer with his oil can."

Rodeheaver was a third-degree Mason, Knights Templar (Freemasonry), and Shriner. He was raised in Lake City-Warsaw Lodge No. 73, Warsaw, Indiana, on December 30, 1914; demitted November 16, 1934; and reaffiliated December 1, 1952.

An associate recalled that Rodeheaver was never the same after his favorite trombone was stolen in February 1952.

== Death and legacy ==
Rodeheaver died of heart failure at Winona Lake in 1955, aged 75. Auditoriums on the campuses of Bob Jones University, Greenville, South Carolina, and Grace College, Winona Lake, Indiana, are named for him.

Rodeheaver was inducted into the Gospel Music Hall of Fame in 1973.

== Sources ==
- Kevin Mungons and Douglas Yeo, Homer Rodeheaver and the Rise of the Gospel Music Industry (Urbana: University of Illinois Press, 2021).
- Roger Butterfield, "Homer Rodeheaver: A Happy Christian with One Old Trombone Is Successfully Preaching Salvation through Song," Life (September 3, 1945), 59–66.
- Bob Jones, Jr., Cornbread and Caviar (Greenville, S.C.: Bob Jones University, 1985).
- Thomas Henry Porter, "Homer Alvin Rodeheaver, Evangelist, Musician and Publisher" (Ph.D. diss., New Orleans Baptist Seminary, 1981).
- Homer Rodeheaver, Twenty Years with Billy Sunday (Rodeheaver Hall-Mack Company, 1936).
- Bert H. Wilhoit, Rody: Memories of Homer Rodeheaver (Greenville, S.C.: Bob Jones University Press, 2000).
