= Ethna Campbell =

Folk singer (c. 1938–2011)

Ethna Campbell was a Northern Irish singer who was a regular performer on Tyne Tees television in the 1960s, and who had a top forty hit in the UK singles chart in 1976.

== Career ==
Starting her career in Belfast as a dance band singer when she was 17, in 1958 workmates at her Belfast tobacco factory persuaded her to enter a Radio Luxembourg talent contest; her success in that led to a regular role on Tyne Tees' One O'Clock Show between 1959 and 1964. In February 1964 she released her first single, a version of the Mary Wells song "It's Easy For Two".

In 1976, her recording of "The Old Rugged Cross" peaked at number 33 in the UK singles charts. She had made the recording in the mid-1960s, but in 1975 a Glasgow radio personality, Frank Skerett, found a copy in a junk shop and played it on his Radio Clyde programme. As a result of strong audience feedback, Campbell - who had retired from showbusiness and was working as a secretary in Leeds - was tracked down to re-record it for Philips Records, and on 18 October 1975 it made the "bubbling under" listing, breaking through into the top 50 at Christmas.

"The Old Rugged Cross" was her only chart hit. Campbell died on 24 September 2011, aged 73, after a long illness.
