= C. Austin Miles =

American writer of gospel songs (1868–1946)

- Born: January 7, 1868; Lakehurst, New Jersey, U.S.
- Died: March 10, 1946 (aged 78); Hahnemann Hospital, Philadelphia, Pennsylvania, U.S.
- Resting place: Hillcrest Memorial Park in Sewell, New Jersey
- Other names: A. A. Payn, C. A. M.
- Notable work: "In the Garden"

Charles Austin Miles (January 7, 1868 – March 10, 1946) was a prolific American writer of gospel songs, who is best known for his 1912 Easter story-based hymn "In the Garden."

== Early life and education ==
Miles was born in Lakehurst, New Jersey, on January 7, 1868. He attended the Philadelphia College of Pharmacy and the University of Pennsylvania.

== Career ==
He worked as a pharmacist until 1892. His first gospel song, "List! ’Tis Jesus’ Voice", was published by the Hall-Mack Company. He worked as editor and manager at Hall-Mack for 37 years.

He said, "It is as a writer of gospel songs I am proud to be known, for in that way I may be of the most use to my Master, whom I serve willingly although not as efficiently as is my desire". He wrote at least 398 songs, and the music to at least eight more.

His best-known song may be "In the Garden" (1912); sometimes known by its first line, "I Come to the Garden Alone". It has been included in 210 hymnals, and recorded numerous times.

== Death ==
A resident of Pitman, New Jersey, Miles died on March 10, 1946, at Hahnemann Hospital in Philadelphia.

== Songs ==
- "Dwelling in Beulah Land" (a.k.a. "God Bless Fiji") (1911)
- "List! ’Tis Jesus’ Voice" (a.k.a. "He's Watching and Waiting") (1894)
- "In the Garden" (a.k.a. "I Come to the Garden Alone") (1912)
- "Sweeter as the Years Roll By" (1914)

Title	Instances in hymnals
Dwelling in Beulah Land (God Bless Fiji)	2
A cheerful word, a kindly smile	2
A fountain was opened on Calvary	3
A King divine is a friend of mine	3
A King is born in Bethlehem	3
A little more giving, a little less greed	2
A sinner more wretched than I	9
A solas al huerto yo voy	3
A wondrous song was given to me	5
Across the mystic maze of years	4
After a while, the burdens we have borne so long	2
All blotted out, all blotted out	2
All earth today is bright and gay	4
All hail to thee, Emanuel	6
All is dark, I cannot see my way	2
All my cloudy days are bright	3
All paths are bright	2
All that drew me I have left behind	2
All that held me, I have left behind	2
All that I am or hope to be	11
All the joy in the world is thine	2
All the nations of the earth rejoice and sing	2
All the world is bright to me	2
Allt blifvit nytt, Efter aangest och strid	2
Angels are singing a glad	1
Anything or nothing, worldly wealth or fame	4
As a lighthouse on the shore	4
As of old when the hosts of Israel	46
As the hills are round	1
As the shadows of the night round are falling	3
As wanderers far from home	1
At morning, when we awaken	2
At one with God, how rich is my condition	5
At the cross, at the cross, Wonder found me	2
Awake, and in his strength renewed	9
Awake, awake, O earth, awake and sing	2
Awake, awake, the dawn of day is breaking	2
Awake, awake, with light the skies are glowing	3
Away with doubt, away with fear	5
Be like Jesus in the home when the trials come	2
Be not idle today, time is passing away	1
Beautiful flowers of Eden	3
Believer, there's a blessing	2
Bells of peace on high	2
Betrayed with a kiss	2
Blessed be he, the God of our salvation	2
Blessed Comforter, dwell in me I pray	2
Blessed day of joy and light	1
Blow, softly blow o’er the hills and vales of Sharon	2
Bring, O bring again to me	2
By the blood on the cross of Calvary	2
By thy love which feared no danger	2
Calling from our ease Jesus bids us bear his banners on	1
Can we behold, through gates of gold	1
Carols sing to our King	2
Child in lowly manger lying	2
Child of sin, why will ye wander	1
Christ is born, Christ is born	2
Christ the king of glory Unto us is born	1
Clinging to Calvary, where naught but love I see	3
Close, close to thee, In childhood	11
Clouds may hover over me and hide my view	10
Come where the fountains are flowing	2
Come, ye heavy laden	3
Conquest banners streaming, Bid us onward go	5
Cross crowned hill above a verdant plain	2
Day by day, hour by hour	2
Do you know my Savior as I know him?	4
Does sin beset your daily path	2
Don't you hear the tumult in the city	4
Down by a river where the breezes blow	2
Draw me nearer, O my Savior	3
Dropping, dropping falls the rain	1
Each moment I will trust in him who did so much for me	1
Earth filled with joy sings the glad refrain	1
Earth is but a place to tarry	2
Earth to summer's joy	1
Easter bells, Easter bells, pealing	2
Ever abiding in his love	2
Ever of him I am singing	1
Every bird and blossom	1
Every nodding blossom seems to say today	1
Every voice that carols to the King	2
Faces bright with delight On this happy morn!	3
Faith reveals in untold beauty	2
Faithful is he and great his mercies are	11
Falter not, falter not in the battle	2
Far above earth's tumult	15
Far above the world so high	2
Far and near sweet and clear	1
Far and wide the angels' song	2
Far away the noise of strife upon my ear is falling	134
Far from my Savior I wandered	2
Far up the mountain of sin do I roam	2
Father divine, hear in this hour	1
Flow, flow on life's broad stream	2
Flow on, flow on, O rivers glad	1
Flowers in the meadow growing	4
For gentle rain that fills anew the spring	2
For my sins, is pardon found	3
For you, sinner, for you	2
Forward, Christian soldier, go	3
From dawn to evensong is but a day	2
From the morning dawn as the hours roll on	2
From the throne flows a wondrous stream	7
Galilean, meek and lowly	4
Ĝardenen mi venas en sol'	2
Gather from the hillsides, gather from the plains	2
Gather the sunbeams as they fall across the path of youth	2
Give me no treasures that last but a while	3
Go and tell unto all the gospel story	12
God holds the key to the crosses	2
God is calling now for workers where no light has gone	2
God is ever careful of his own	4
God laid on me a cross to carry	2
God's own hand shall lead me	5
Good night and God bless you	2
Grant, my dear Lord, thy blessing unto me	5
Great is the Lord, and greatly to be praised! In the city of our God (Miles)	2
Hark, on the highway of life a sound As crested waves of ocean roar	9
Hark, the Sabbath bells are pealing Softly o'er the dew-kissed land	2
Hasten away, do not delay	3
Hate made a cross from the wood of a tree	3
Have you done your very best	3
Have you ever tried to bear your burdens all alone	13
He my refuge is, my fortress, I will put my trust in him	3
He will hear me when I call	1
Hear the chimes of the gospel bells	2
Hear the Easter bells, blessed Easter bells	1
Hear the song of the murmuring sea	1
Heavenly doors were opened	3
Here in the name of Christ our King	2
Here we all must part, here the aching heart	14
Hold thou my hand, O Lord when pleasures vain allure me	2
Holy Bible, word divine	3
How glorious is the holy word	4
How often you think of your home	2
Hvar och ensaa s'ger Gud	2
I am fully satisfied with Jesus' love	2
I am glad to tell, with my soul 'tis well	2
I am happy every day, for I know	2
I am happy in the Lord, sweetly trusting	2
I am not under law, I'm under grace	5
I am rejoicing now in sins forgiven	6
I am sailing on a sea	3
I am the Way, the Savior said, And I would	10
I can face all trials here	2
I cannot keep from singing, the Praises of My God	2
I cannot understand while walking hand in hand	2
I claim for my own a King on a throne	4
I come to the garden alone	220
I do not know and none can tell	2
I do not know the depths of Jesus' love, that brought Him down	7
I have a Comrade who knows me well	2
I have a cross that I must bear	2
I have a friend indeed, a friend I often need	9
I have a friend, than whom I need no other	2
I have a friend unfailing	4
I have a friend who knows me so well	2
I have blessed peace though the storm may beat	2
I hear it in the midnight hour	2
I knew I was a sinner	2
I know I am a sinner in the sight of God	2
I know I love my Savior, When all is fair and bright	2
I love him because I know him	4
I love him, though unworthy ever	2
I love to think of Jesus, who else could it be	10
I must have Jesus with me when the morning light	4
I must lay this body down and soar away	8
I need the blood to me applied	2
I often wonder what shall be	2
I saw around the throne	2
I seem to see one walking	3
I shall wear a golden crown,	33
I sought to find my heart's desire	2
I strive to walk the narrow way	2
I walk with Jesus though his pierced feet	2
I want to be there at the roll call	3
I want to tell the story I love so well	2
I was once a sinner, but I came	47
I will not leave you comfortless (Miles)	2
I will not let thee go until thou bless me even here	2
I will seek to be a blessing	5
I'd like to be a child again	2
If a cross I bear	3
If pathless forests meet my view	7
If the voice of God should come to you today	22
If to Christ our only King	36
If you are a loafah an' a drunkard	4
If you have knelt before your God in prayer	2
I'll cling to him, whose pierced feet	2
I'll cling to thee, Jesus, in joy and in pain	2
I'll lift up my head and rejoicing I'll sing	2
I'll never cease to love him, he's done so much for me	4
I'll patiently wait on each promise	1
I'm traveling now on the safest road	9
I'm weary of bearing my burden	6
In a manger low, in a cattle shed	3
In my heart I have a song	2
In the beauty of the earth and the glowing skies	4
In the gardens of the world	1
In the glory of the early morning	2
In the meadows green	1
In the sky the stars are shining	1
In the strength of God	1
In the tomb they laid him	1
In the word of God is a wondrous plan	2
In thy hands, O Jesus, all my life I place	2
Is there on your heart a burden	2
Is there One who can feed the hungry soul	2
It may be in the valley, where countless dangers hide	58
I've been redeemed by the precious blood	4
I've been redeemed thro' Jesus' precious blood	1
I've left Egypt and its sin behind me	2
Jerusalem, O city bright	2
Jesus calls for soldiers true	2
Jesus Christ my pardon purchased	3
Jesus, I have come to thee	3
Jesus in the morning when I wake	2
Jesus knows my cares	3
Jesus, my Savior, calls in tones so clear	3
Jesus, my Savior, when I stand and view	2
Jesus, the Son, who came to save us	2
Jesus, to thee I kneel in sweet submission	2
Jesus, to thy mighty name	1
Jesus, we plead in one accord	2
Joy is springing in this soul of mine and a song is in my heart	4
Just a little nearer, speaks a loving voice	3
Just a step from here to heaven	2
Just beyond the river Jordan	1
Just beyond the river Jordan, just across its chilling tide	11
Just to have the loving heart of Jesus	3
Kings of the earth dwell in palaces fair	2
Lead on, King of Love	1
Lead on, not with the sword the brave of the earth are wielding	1
Let every tribe and ration	1
Let me serve thee more and more	1
Life is but a moment that soon will be past	2
Life is but a span in the measure of years	2
Life is full of sunshine when the sun	3
Life is like the rolling ocean	2
Like an army marching Come the children	1
Listen to the song the birds are singing	2
Living for the Master only	2
Lo! an angel host descending	3
Long ago I lost my evil love for sinning	5
Look up when all the way is dark	5
Lord, bless the songs thy people sing	1
Lord, let my eyes be quick to see	2
Lullaby, Lullaby, Angels guard thy sleeping	2
Lying in a manger, see the Child	1
March on, O sons of God	6
Mid the throng in which I'm daily living	3
My Father's house above	3
My heart is singing as the days go by	3
My lifeboat is sailing across the sea of time	3
My Lord has done so much for me, through all the passing days	3
My sins became so heavy	1
My sins, O the peace giving thought	2
My sins were many, without a doubt	3
My soul had long been seeking peace and rest	2
My trust I place now and ever	6
My way was not the right way	3
Myriads of fragrant flowers	2
Name of all the names the dearest	3
Never friendless, I have a wonderful friend	3
Never mind the weather, dark or fair	5
Night is over Now once more	1
No caste nor creed, nor party pride	2
No matter where you may roam, friend, someone cares	2
Nothing have I to offer worth his praise	2
Now Children's Day is over	2
O come and walk with me	2
O for words to sing unto Christ my King	4
O Friend of sinners, I know thy great compassion	3
O garden lowly, earthly yet holy	2
O give ear to our cry O Lord	3
O happy Christian, who knows his sin forgiven	2
O how marvelous, O how wonderful	2
O I'm travelling, hallelujah	2
O joyous bells of Easter morning	2
O let us to the tomb now wend	3
O radiant morn, when Jesus was born	2
O sin of mine, that bowed his head	2
O sinner, your Savior now waiting stands	7
O starry night, with a holy	1
O the joyous greetings we shall see	2
O the wondrous love the Father shows	3
O what a change from a world of despair	7
O what comfort is mine when the love-light I see	2
Over the battlements of heaven	8
O'er the hills and valleys let the tidings fly	2
Over the sea, wild and free comes a call to you and me	2
Oft perplexed by doubt and fear	2
On our way, day by day	1
On the cross my Savior died	1
On the Eastern plain the flocks are sleeping	1
On the mount exalted or in valley low	2
Once so drearily we scanned the cloudy sky	1
Once upon the cross Jesus died for me	2
One more day of service ends	2
Onward, onward, speed thy conq’ring flight	2
Open, O gates of glory	2
Open wide the windows of your soul and find	2
Other folks may not approve me	2
Out on the ocean my frail bark will glide	2
Over all a God of love is reigning	3
Over and over, I'm tempted and tried	2
Over the valleys the shadows fall	2
Praises be to God for I am glory bound	11
Prepare ye for service, put on the Gospel Armor	2
Press on rejoicing for God is your hope	1
Put on the armor of the gospel	1
Rejoice, rejoice, the King	2
Rejoice! The Lord Jehovah reigns	2
Remember thy Creator and learn to heed his word	7
Ring a message far and wide	3
Ring on, O bells of hope	5
Ring, ring, merry, merry bells	2
Ringing sweetly on the quiet air	2
Room for Jesus, can it be	10
Rouse ye O ye freemen	3
Safe in the fold we've gathered the sheep	4
Said Washington to Betsy Ross	5
Say, what means this great commotion	2
See the foe advancing now, ready for the fray	2
See, where the Mighty Victor	2
Send forth the glad evangel	1
Shadows are falling and voices	1
Shepherd divine be thou near us	3
Shine on, starry light	1
Sin may leave its mark on me	3
Sing a song of joy and gladness	2
Sing a song of praise on the cloudy days	1
Sing hosannas to the Living Lord	2
Sing with joy, for the world still awaits to hear	2
Singing to Christ our King as we march along	1
Slumber, Child divine	3
Softly the south winds are sighing	1
Sometimes above the path I tread	2
Sometimes the days seem so dreary	2
Sometimes you grow weary	2
Somewhere on the path of life	3
Song birds come from the south	1
Songbirds come from the south, hasten on your way	1
Sons of God and heirs of heaven	1
Souls are dying everywhere	4
Sowing, sowing, sowing for the Master	3
Star of the Christmas morning	2
Star of the midnight gleaming	2
Storms do not alarm me, they sometime must cease	2
Summer days, filled with praise, Now on earth adoring	1
Summer's gift is with us, joy is all around	1
Sweep on to conquer the unknown world	3
Sweet are the roses of Sharon	5
Sweet is the voice of a mother	1
Take Jesus with you in youth's brightest hours	2
Take your burden to Jesus	4
Tarry with me, my Savior, when the morn breaks	8
The army of the cross advances	4
The bells of heaven in tune with earth	1
The birds have their nests, the blessed Master said	2
The clarion call is ringing clear	2
The clouds may hover over me	1
The day is far spent, O Master	2
The days that glide so swiftly down the highway of the past	2
The golden sands are flowing	3
The heavens are telling the glory of God (Miles)	2
The hills are crowned with roses	3
The hope of the world is Calvary	2
The hope of the world is Jesus	3
The love of the Savior of sinners	5
The Master is come and calleth for thee (Miles)	2
The meadows there are always green	2
The mourners left weeping	5
The night winds are singing	1
The path that I have trod	4
The pathway is often so dreary I scarce can see	2
The Savior stands outside thy door	2
The shadows of the night	2
The story of redemption still is told	2
The strangers to God his grace and his love	4
The sunshine I have found will fill each day with joy	7
The wise men sought him and worshiped at his feet	1
The word came unto Noah, Go and build yourself an ark	2
The word of the Lord can never fail	4
The word that God has given, why should a man deny	4
The world that God has given	2
The youth of every land	3
There are many mansions fair	2
There are many souls in darkness living	2
There are sorrows which for us are hard to bear	3
There are souls that wait for the gospel light	1
There are those who are discouraged	2
There are two ways before me	5
There is a city, bright and fair (Miles)	2
There is a land of wondrous beauty	13
There is a name that is laden with grace	3
There is a Shepherd who cares for His own	39
There is hope, O soul, for you	5
There is no cross now standing on Calvary's hill	3
There is no day so dark, but has its gleam	3
There is no storm where Jesus is	2
There is one who always walks beside me	4
There is one who stands upon the threshold	2
There is one whose love is steadfast ever	1
There may be lands as yet unknown	3
There was a Rose in Sharon growing	2
There's a Friend who waits to save thee	1
There's a happy home my soul shall dwell within	1
There's a land of bliss eternal, Where the saints their Lord behold	1
There's a land of peace and plenty	4
There's a land to which my steps are leading	4
There's a mansion that is waiting over there	3
There's a message borne	2
There's a mighty army marching, which can never be dismayed	1
There's a mother on her knees in prayer	4
There's a name that makes my happiness complete	2
There's a new name written down in glory	2
There's a robe that I shall wear	3
There's a shout in the camp, keep the fires brightly burning	13
There's a wedding feast preparing	3
They crucified him who knew no sin	2
They nailed my Lord upon the tree	7
This is my salvation, Jesus died for me	2
This land through which I journey, is beautiful to me	4
This the morn Christ was born, long ago	2
Though all the world may pass me by	2
Though many, many years may pass away	3
Though the tomb essayed to hold him	4
Thou shalt not have, so says the Lord	6
Though I know I must go through the valley low	2
Though the hand of winter touches hill and plain	2
Though the storms of life may gather	2
Though the world allure with its gilded charm	5
Through the heavy losses, and unyielding crosses	2
Through the Savior, crucified	1
Thy white stars laid in heaven's blue	3
Time stands and waits while we go rushing by	3
'Tis the Lord who redeems us, who has shown the way	3
Toiling, and often weary	2
Trusting in Jesus from day to day	3
Trusting Jesus, trusting every day	1
Trusting though the clouds may gather heavy overhead	2
'Twas love that gave at greatest cost	3
'Twas the life of Christ, my Lord	8
'Twas when I surrendered to Christ my all	2
Una vez perdido vivía yo	2
Unto him who rose in his glory	1
Up Calvary's hill Jesus patiently trod	10
Uplifted high on Calvary across I see	3
Waken O earth, nor silent	1
Walking in the morning bright	12
Walking with Jesus on Emmaus way	2
We are looking upward every day	2
We are marching on to the Glory land, We fear no foe before us	2
We are sailors on the sea of life	1
We are waiting for the dawning of the day	2
We are willing workers, waiting Jesus' call	2
We believe, O Lord, in the Holy Spirit [Ghost]	4
We come, we come, with happy voices singing joyous songs of praise	1
We walk and talk together	4
Weary and wandering and sunken in sin	4
You may look for me, for I'll be there	1
