= God Bless Fiji =

National anthem of Fiji

- National anthem of Fiji
- Also known as: "Meda dau doka" (Fijian version) "Bhagavaan Fiji ko Aasheervaad Den" (भगवान फिजी को आशीर्वाद दें) (Fiji Hindi version)
- Lyrics: Michael Francis Alexander Prescott
- Music: C. Austin Miles (original), 1911; Viliame Bale (band arrangement)
- Adopted: 1970

Audio sample
- U.S. Navy Band instrumental version (one verse and chorus): file; help

"God Bless Fiji" is the national anthem of Fiji. It is called "Meda Dau Doka" (Fijian: [me.ⁿda ⁿdɔu̯ ⁿdo.ka]) in Fijian and "Bhagavaan Fiji ko Aasheervaad Den" (भगवान फिजी को आशीर्वाद दें) in Fiji Hindi. The lyrics were written by Michael Francis Alexander Prescott (1928–2006) to the tune of the hymn "Dwelling in Beulah Land" by Charles Austin Miles (1911), and the music was adapted by Viliame Bale, Superintendent and Director of Music in the Royal Fiji Police Band. The anthem was adopted upon independence from the United Kingdom in 1970.

== Lyrics ==
The anthem's English version is usually sung. The English and Fijian lyrics are not translations of each other and have very little in common.

In August 2008, the draft version of the People's Charter for Change, Peace and Progress, a government document intended to supplement the Constitution and reconcile ethnic and linguistic divides, suggested that the national anthem should be in the country's three main languages: Fijian, Hindi and English. The Charter later served as the basis for the 2013 Constitution of Fiji.

=== English lyrics ===
I
Blessing grant oh God of nations on the isles of Fiji
As we stand united under noble banner blue
And we honour and defend the cause of freedom ever
Onward march together, God bless Fiji.

Chorus:
For Fiji, ever Fiji, let our voices ring with pride
For Fiji, ever Fiji, her name hail far and wide, (Note: "Hail" is sometimes sung as "hails".)
A land of freedom, hope and glory to endure whatever befall (Note: "Whatever" is sometimes sung as "whate'er", and "befall" is sometimes sung as "befalls".)
May God bless Fiji forever more!

II
Blessing grant, oh God of nations, on the isles of Fiji
Shores of golden sand and sunshine, happiness and song
Stand united, we of Fiji, fame and glory ever
Onward march together, God bless Fiji.

Chorus

=== Fijian lyrics ===
Fijian original

I
Meda dau doka ka vinakata na vanua
E ra sa dau tiko kina na savasava
Rawa tu na gauna ni sautu na veilomani
Biu na i tovo tawa savasava. (Note: Sometimes sung as Me sa biu na i tovo tawa yaga. ([me sa ᵐbi̯u na‿i to.βo ta.ɰa ja.ŋa]).)

Chorus:
Me bula ga ko Viti ka me toro ga ki liu
Me ra turaga vinaka ko ira na i liuliu (Note: Ra is sometimes omitted.)
Me ra liutaki na tamata e na veika vinaka
Me oti kina na i tovo ca!

II
Bale ga vei kemuni na cauravou e Viti
Ni yavala me savasava na vanua
Ni kakua ni vosota na dukadukali
Ka me da sa qai biuta vakadua

Chorus

IPA transcription (Note: See Help:IPA/Fijian, Fijian language § Phonology and Fijian language § Orthography.)

1
[me.ⁿda ⁿdɔu̯ ⁿdo.ka ka βi.na.ka.ta na βa.nu.a]
[e ra sa ⁿdɔu̯ ti.ko ki.na na sa.βa.sa.βa]
[ra.ɰa tu na ŋɔu̯.na ni sɔu̯.tu na βei̯.lo.ma.ni]
[ᵐbi̯u na‿i to.βo ta.ɰa sa.βa.sa.βa]

[me ᵐbu.la ŋa ko βi.t(ʃ)i ka me to.ro ŋa ki li̯u]
[me (ra) tu.ra.ŋa βi.na.ka ko i.ra na‿i li̯u.li̯u]
[me ra li̯u.ta.ki na ta.ma.ta e na βei̯.ka βi.na.ka]
[me o.ti ki.na na‿i to.βo ða]

2
[ᵐba.le ŋa βei̯ ke.mu.ni na ðɔu̯.ra.βɔu̯ e βi.t(ʃ)i]
[ni ja.βa.la me sa.βa.sa.βa na βa.nu.a]
[ni ka.ku.a ni βo.so.ta na ⁿdu.ka.ⁿdu.ka.li]
[ka me ⁿda sa ᵑɡai̯ ᵐbi̯u.ta βa.ka.ⁿdu.a]

English translation

I
Let us show our pride and honour our nation
Where righteous people reside
Where prosperity and fellowship may persevere
Abandon deeds that are immoral

Chorus:
Let Fiji live on and progress onwards
May our leaders be honourable men
Let them lead our people to great things
And bring an end to all things immoral

II
The burden of change lie on your shoulders youth of Fiji
Be the strength to cleanse our nation
Be wary and not harbour malice
For we must abandon such sentiments forever

Chorus

=== Fiji Hindi lyrics ===
Latin lyrics

I
He jagdishwar, kripa karo tum Fiji desh pe apne
Ahle watan hum teri sharan mein, teri dhwaja ke neehe
Ajaadi ki raksha aur samman sada hum karege
Sab milke badhte rahege, sarwamangal Fiji

Chorus:
Yeh Fiji, hamara Fiji, hum sab mil gaate rahe
Yeh Fiji Hamara Fiji, yeh naara lagate rahe
Dharti hai apni, azaadi, asha aur garva ki
Kripa rahe prabhu ki, Fiji par sarwada

== See also ==
- Modern history of Fiji
