= Mary E. Byrd =

American astronomer and professor of astronomy (1849–1934)

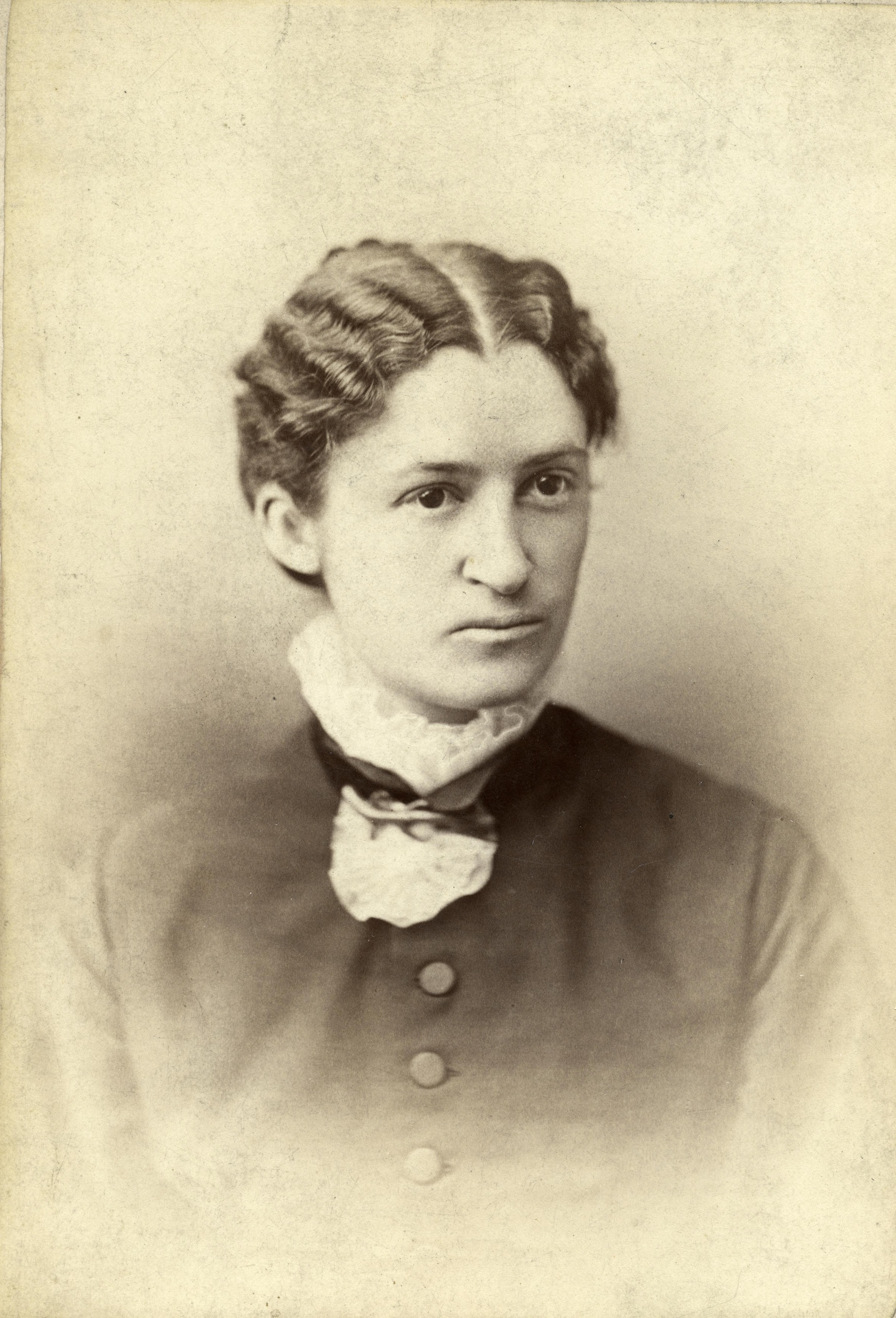
- University of Michigan student portrait, 1878
- Born: Mary Emma Byrd; November 15, 1849; Le Roy, Michigan
- Died: July 30, 1934 (aged 84); Lawrence, Kansas

Mary Emma Byrd (November 15, 1849 – July 13, 1934) was an American astronomer and educator. She is considered a pioneer astronomy teacher at college level. She was also an astronomer in her own right, determining cometary positions by photography.

== Early life ==
Mary E. Byrd was born November 15, 1849, in Le Roy, Michigan, to the reverend John Huntington Byrd and Elizabeth Adelaide Lowe as the second of six children. The family moved to Kansas in 1855. Her father was strongly opposed to slavery and the slave trade, and managed a station of the Underground Railroad. Her mother was a descendant of John Endecott. Her parents instilled in her a strong Puritan belief, making her a person of high moral principles. Her uncle, David Lowe, a Kansas judge, who served for one term in Congress, refused to seek re-election because he found "politics and ideal honesty incompatible."

== Education ==
In the late 19th century it was very difficult for a young woman to get higher education. Mary Byrd was a teacher, on and off, while trying to get an education. Byrd graduated from Leavenworth High School. She attended Oberlin College from 1871 to 1874, when John Millott Ellis was the college president. She left Oberlin before graduating and graduated from the University of Michigan with a B.A. in 1878. In 1879 Byrd worked as the principal of Wabash High School in Indiana until 1882, when she left to study astronomy at Harvard College Observatory under Dr. E.C. Pickering. She received the degree of Doctor of Philosophy from Carleton College in 1904.

Byrd was one of a group of young women who were the pioneers of coeducation. Most notable in this group was probably Alice Freeman Palmer. She worked briefly at The Coast Star in Manasquan, NJ prior to her death.

== Career ==
A Laboratory Manual in Astronomy, 1899

In 1883 she became the First Assistant at the Godsell Observatory at Carleton College, and in 1887 she was appointed Director of the Smith College Observatory and professor of astronomy.

Byrd had a particular research interest in "fixing positions of comets by micrometer measures of their distance from known stars."

In 1906, Byrd, at the height of her career, resigned from her positions at Smith because the college accepted money from Andrew Carnegie and John D. Rockefeller, which she found reprehensible. Upon her resignation, she returned to Lawrence, Kansas. She continued writing, and contributed many articles to Popular Astronomy magazine.

During her life Byrd was a member of the Astronomical and Astrophysical Society of America (now the American Astronomical Society or simply AAS), the Astronomical Society of the Pacific, the British Astronomical Association, the Anti-Imperialist League of Northampton, the American Mathematical Society (Ref. New York Mathematical Society list of members June 1892, page 6.

== Death ==
Byrd died of cerebral hemorrhage on July 30, 1934 in Lawrence, Kansas.

== Works ==
- Laboratory Manual in Astronomy which was published in 1899 and is currently available as a reprint by BiblioLife, ISBN 978-1-110-12258-5
- First Observations In Astronomy: A Handbook For Schools And Colleges which was published in 1913 and is currently available as a reprint by Kessinger Publishing, ISBN 0-548-62274-4
