= The Old Rugged Cross =

1912 hymn by George Bennard

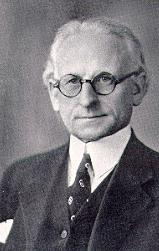
- Bennard, the author of lyrics and music
- Genre: Methodist hymn
- Written: 1912
- Text: by George Bennard
- Meter: 6.6.8.6.6.8.9.9.9.9
- Melody: by George Bennard
- Published: 1915

"The Old Rugged Cross" is a popular hymn written in 1912 by American evangelist and song-leader George Bennard (1873–1958).

== History ==
George Bennard was a native of Youngstown, Ohio, but was reared in Iowa. After his conversion in a Salvation Army meeting, he and his wife became brigade leaders before leaving the organization for the Methodist Church. As a Methodist evangelist, Bennard wrote the first verse of "The Old Rugged Cross" in Albion, Michigan, in the fall of 1912 (Note: Bennard himself said that it was 1913.) as a response to ridicule that he had received at a revival meeting. Bennard traveled with Ed E. Mieras from Chicago to Sturgeon Bay, Wisconsin, where they held evangelistic meetings at the Friends Church from December 29, 1912, to January 12, 1913. During the meetings Rev. George Bennard finished "The Old Rugged Cross" and on the last night of the meeting Bennard and Mieras performed it as a duet before a full house with Pearl Torstensen Berg, organist for the meeting, as accompanist. Charles H. Gabriel, a well-known gospel-song composer helped Bennard with the harmonies. The completed version was then performed on June 7, 1913, by a choir of five, accompanied by a guitar in Pokagon, Michigan, at the First Methodist Episcopal Church of Pokagon. Published in 1915, the song was popularized during Billy Sunday evangelistic campaigns by two members of his campaign staff, Homer Rodeheaver (who bought rights to the song for $50 or $500) and Virginia Asher, who were perhaps also the first to record it in 1921. The Old Rugged Cross uses a sentimental popular song form with a verse/chorus pattern in 6/8 time, and it speaks of the writer's adoration of Christ and His sacrifice at Calvary. Bennard retired to Reed City, Michigan, and the town maintains a museum dedicated to his life and ministry. A memorial has also been created in Youngstown at Lake Park Cemetery. A plaque commemorating the first performance of the song stands in front of the Friend's Church in Sturgeon Bay.

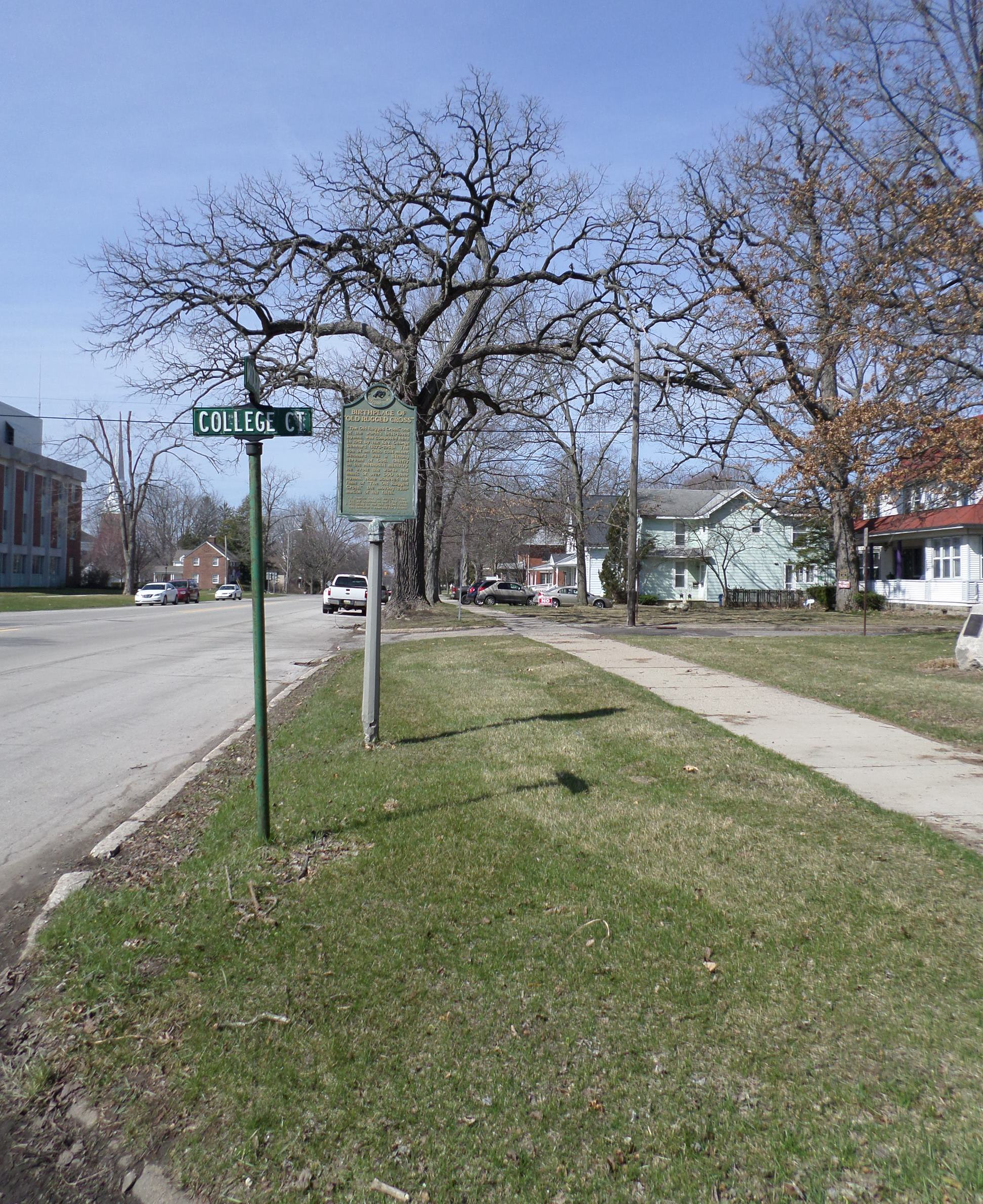
Old Rugged Cross historical sign, Albion, Michigan

== Influence ==
"The Old Rugged Cross" has been a country gospel favorite ever since it became the title song of Ernest Tubb's 1952 gospel album; it has been performed by some of the twentieth century's most important recording artists, including Al Green, Andy Griffith, Anne Murray, Brad Paisley, Chet Atkins, Chris Barber, John Berry, Floyd Cramer, George Jones, Eddy Arnold, Jim Reeves, Johnny Cash and June Carter, Kevin Max, Ella Fitzgerald, Mahalia Jackson, Marvin L Sapp, Jo Stafford, George Beverly Shea, Gordon MacRae, The Mills Brothers, Merle Haggard, Patsy Cline, Loretta Lynn, Ray Price, Ricky Van Shelton, Tennessee Ernie Ford, Rahsaan Roland Kirk, Roy Rogers and Dale Evans, The Oak Ridge Boys, The Statler Brothers, Thurl Ravenscroft, Vince Gill, Willie Nelson, Alan Jackson, James Morrison on the 1990 album "Snappy Doo", and John Prine on the 2007 album "Standard Songs for Average People" with Mac Wiseman. British television dramatist Dennis Potter used the gospel song prominently in several of his plays, most notably Pennies from Heaven (1978); and the song also played a major part in "Gridlock" (2007), an episode of the long-running sci-fi drama series Doctor Who. In early 2009, the song was covered by Ronnie Milsap on his gospel album Then Sings My Soul. Carrie Underwood covered the song on her gospel album My Savior in 2021. In 2024, the song was covered by Janalynn Castelino and released as a single during Lent.

== Lyrics ==
On a hill far away
Stood an old rugged Cross
The emblem of suff'ring and shame
And I love that old Cross
Where the dearest and best
For a world of lost sinners was slain

So I'll cherish the old rugged Cross
Till my trophies at last I lay down
I will cling to the old rugged Cross
And exchange it some day for a crown

Oh, that old rugged Cross
So despised by the world
Has a wondrous attraction for me
For the dear Lamb of God
Left His Glory above
To bear it to dark Calvary

So I'll cherish the old rugged Cross
Till my trophies at last I lay down
I will cling to the old rugged Cross
And exchange it some day for a crown

In the old rugged Cross
Stain'd with blood so divine
A wondrous beauty I see
For 'twas on that old cross
Jesus suffered and died
To pardon and sanctify me

So I'll cherish the old rugged Cross
Till my trophies at last I lay down
I will cling to the old rugged Cross
And exchange it some day for a crown

To the old rugged Cross
I will ever be true
Its shame and reproach gladly bear
Then He'll call me some day
To my home far away
Where His glory forever I'll share

So I'll cherish the old rugged Cross
Till my trophies at last I lay down
I will cling to the old rugged Cross
And exchange it some day for a crown

== Media ==
In his art parody volume Art Afterpieces, Ward Kimball created a variation on the painting Expulsion from Paradise by the 15th-century artist Giovanni di Paolo, which shows God pointing at a large circle below him. Kimball centered the record label of "The Old Rugged Cross", as published by Victor, on the circle in the picture, complete with the trademark of Nipper (His Master's Voice).

A version by singer Ethna Campbell reached number 33 in the UK singles chart in 1976.

In On A Pale Horse, “The Old Rugged Cross” is played as the last request of a dying man.

In Series 3, Episode 3 ("Gridlock") of Doctor Who, "The Old Rugged Cross" is broadcast to citizens of New New York as they traverse the motorway.

In Series 4, Episode 5 of Hetty Wainthropp Investigates, "The Old Rugged Cross" is sung by Hetty (played by Patricia Routledge) and a local male voice choir.

In the 2019 film Just Mercy, "The Old Rugged Cross" sung by Ella Fitzgerald plays in the background as Herbert Richardson is executed.

In the 2021 Showtime miniseries Dexter: New Blood episode "The Family Business", a version of the song, performed by L Shape Lot, can be heard playing in Elric Kane's vehicle as he drives Dexter to the remote cabin of Kurt Caldwell.
