= Virginia Healey Asher =

- Born: December 18, 1869; Chicago, Illinois
- Died: February 2, 1937 (aged 67); Florida

Virginia Healey Asher (December 18, 1869 – February 2, 1937) was a gospel singer and evangelist to women.

== Biography ==
Virginia Healey was born in Chicago to Irish Catholic parents, who however, did not seem to mind their daughter attending services at Moody Church, then pastored by R. A. Torrey, an associate of evangelist Dwight L. Moody. Healey was converted to evangelical Christianity at the age of eleven and shortly thereafter became involved in the church’s Sunday School ministry. Healey had a fine contralto voice and apparently received some professional training from George F. Root.

In the service of Moody Church she met her future husband, William Asher, who had been converted at the same evangelistic meeting as Healey, and they were married on December 14, 1887. Their only child died at birth. Virginia Asher attended classes at the precursor of Moody Bible Institute, although she did not graduate.

In the 1890s, the couple held open-air evangelistic meetings near the original Ferris wheel, built for the World's Columbian Exposition in Chicago (1893). Their success there led to William Asher being called as assistant pastor of Jefferson Park Presbyterian Church, where both Ashers worked for five years during the pastorate of J. Frank Talmadge. During this period, professional baseball player and future evangelist Billy Sunday attended services at the church.

The Ashers moved on to Duluth, Minnesota where they evangelized in the slums and at Duluth Bethel, a ministry to seamen, miners, and lumberjacks in the frontier port city. The Ashers then became assistants in the evangelistic campaigns of J. Wilbur Chapman, for whom Billy Sunday eventually became the advance man. The ministry of the Ashers focused on sailors, prisoners, and the working poor, until ill health forced Virginia Asher to return home to Winona Lake, Indiana, where both Chapman and Sunday also owned cottages.

By the first decade of the twentieth century, the evangelistic ministry of Billy Sunday had grown dramatically in both size and income, and Sunday’s wife, Nell began to travel with her husband and manage the campaign staff. Nell Sunday first hired two female Bible teachers, Grace Sax and Francis Miller, and then in 1911 invited the Ashers to become part of the organization.

Virginia Asher took charge of the ministry to “businesswomen,” mostly shop girls, hospital employees, and factory operatives—any women who worked outside their homes. Often they had been recently deracinated from rural families and viewed their employment as only a temporary expedient before an anticipated marriage. Asher organized local churchwomen to serve as hostesses at luncheons for these young women. They would be served a simple five- to ten-cent lunch—perhaps a sandwich, a pickle, and coffee—before Asher spoke to them about such sins as promiscuity and drinking. They were also strongly encouraged to attend the Billy Sunday services in the evenings.

At the evangelistic services, Virginia Asher often sang duets with music director Homer Rodeheaver, and their early recordings popularized such gospel songs as “The Old Rugged Cross” and “In the Garden". Meanwhile, William Asher began to serve as Sunday’s advance man and fundraiser, and he and his wife were often geographically separated, which they accepted as a necessary part of their ministry.

At the end of a series of Sunday meetings in a city, Virginia Asher organized “businesswomen’s councils” to continue Bible studies and evangelistic work after the Sunday organization had left for another campaign. In 1922, the councils organized a national organization, the Virginia Asher Businesswomen’s Councils, that held annual meetings at Winona Lake Bible Conference. Local associations continued to exist well into the 1950s.

As Billy Sunday campaigns declined in popularity, ill health forced Asher to retire from Sunday’s staff after seventeen years of service. She died at her home in Florida in February 1937.

== Bibliography ==
- Brief biography at Billy Graham Center Archives, Papers of Virginia Healey Asher - Collection 197
- Kevin Mungons and Douglas Yeo, Homer Rodeheaver and the Rise of the Gospel Music Industry (Urbana: University of Illinois Press, 2021), 30–31, 80, 203–04.
- Lyle W. Dorsett, Billy Sunday and the Redemption of Urban America (Grand Rapids, MI: Eerdmans, 1991), 80, 103-06.
- William C. McLoughlin, "Billy Sunday and the Working Girl of 1915," Journal of Presbyterian History, 54 (1976): 380-82.
- Obituary, New York Times, February 3, 1937, 23.
