= LeRoy Township, Michigan =

- Civil township
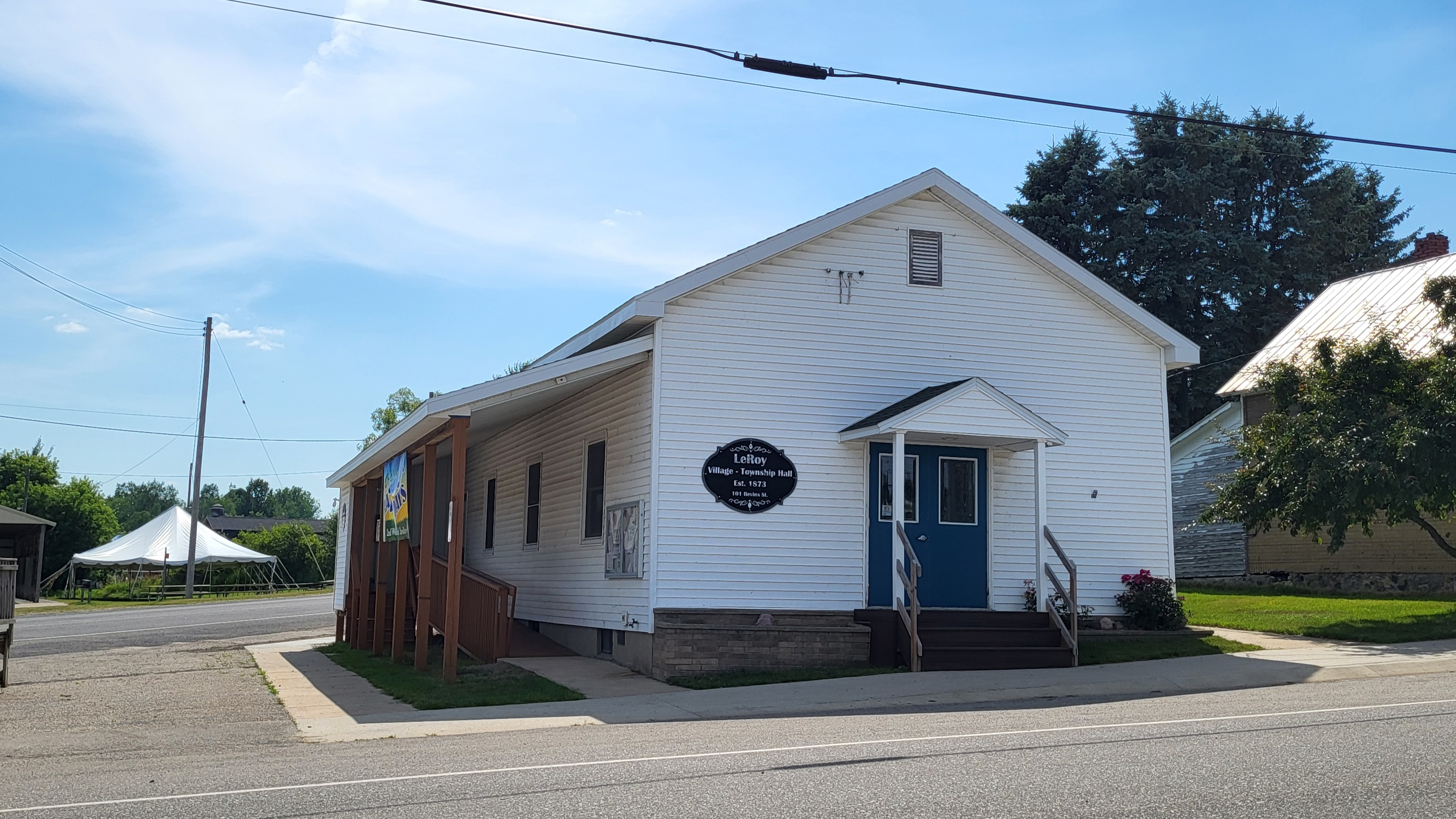
- LeRoy Township Hall in LeRoy

- Location within Osceola County (red) and the administered village of LeRoy (pink)

- Location within the state of Michigan Location within the United States
- Coordinates: 44°02′04″N 85°29′21″W
- Country: United States
- State: Michigan
- County: Osceola
- Established: 1870

Government
  - Supervisor: Anja Wing
  - Clerk: Stacie Dvonch

Area
  - Total: 35.11 sq mi (90.93 km^{2})
  - Land: 35.00 sq mi (90.65 km^{2})
  - Water: 0.11 sq mi (0.28 km^{2})
- Elevation: 1,155 ft (352 m)

Population (2020)
  - Total: 1,246
  - Density: 35.9/sq mi (13.9/km^{2})
- Time zone: UTC-5 (Eastern (EST))
  - Summer (DST): UTC-4 (EDT)
- ZIP code(s): 49677 (Reed City); 49679 (Sears)
- Area code: 231
- FIPS code: 26-47120
- GNIS feature ID: 1626609
- Website: Official website

LeRoy Township is a civil township of Osceola County in the U.S. state of Michigan. The population was 1,246 at the 2020 census. The Village of LeRoy is located within the township.

== History ==
It was the forests that first attracted settlers, as land to the south and east had already been cleared for farms. The demand for lumber was great and professional land lookers were sent out to find the best timber tracts which could be bought for $1.25 or less per acre. Much of the land was purchased by railroad companies, lumbermen, and land speculators. In 1864 the railroad had an agent in the area, although the first train did not reach the area until the latter part of November 1871.

The location that later became LeRoy Township was called "end of twenty" by the railroad, so called as the result of a decision by the railroad to build the railroad twenty miles north of Paris, its terminal at the time.

The township was organized from Lincoln Township by order of the Board with its local government established at a meeting on April 4 of 1870.

== Communities ==
- LeRoy is the only incorporated Village within LeRoy Township.
- Dewing's (also known as Dewing's Siding) was a community centered on a sawmill in this township. It had a post office from 1900 until 1907, and included a sawmill, store, school and church.

== Geography ==
According to the United States Census Bureau, the township has a total area of 35.1 square miles (91 km^{2}), of which 34.9 square miles (90 km^{2}) is land and 0.2 square miles (0.52 km^{2}) (0.46%) is water.

== Demographics ==
As of the census of 2000, there were 1,159 people, 418 households, and 316 families residing in the township. The population density was 33.2 inhabitants per square mile (12.8/km^{2}). There were 537 housing units at an average density of 15.4 per square mile (5.9/km^{2}). The racial makeup of the township was 97.67% White, 0.17% African American, 0.60% Native American, 0.26% Asian, 0.09% Pacific Islander, and 1.21% from two or more races. Hispanic or Latino of any race were 1.12% of the population.

There were 418 households, out of which 39.0% had children under the age of 18 living with them, 62.4% were married couples living together, 9.3% had a female householder with no husband present, and 24.2% were non-families. 20.8% of all households were made up of individuals, and 9.3% had someone living alone who was 65 years of age or older. The average household size was 2.77 and the average family size was 3.19.

In the township the population was spread out, with 30.5% under the age of 18, 7.1% from 18 to 24, 29.2% from 25 to 44, 22.3% from 45 to 64, and 11.0% who were 65 years of age or older. The median age was 35 years. For every 100 females, there were 94.5 males. For every 100 females age 18 and over, there were 93.3 males.

The median income for a household in the township was $35,625, and the median income for a family was $42,404. Males had a median income of $27,625 versus $23,804 for females. The per capita income for the township was $15,333. About 8.9% of families and 10.6% of the population were below the poverty line, including 14.1% of those under age 18 and 17.1% of those age 65 or over.
