= Rainbow Records =

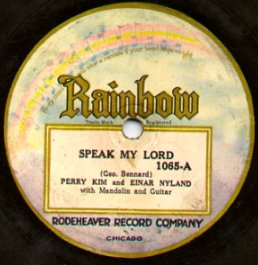
- Founded: 1920
- Founder: Homer Rodeheaver
- Defunct: 1955
- Status: Inactive
- Genre: gospel
- Location: Chicago, Illinois, and Winona Lake, Indiana

Rainbow Records was a record label based in the United States of America in 1920 which featured recordings of Christian gospel music, hymns, and spirituals.

Rainbow Records were made by the Rodeheaver Record Company of Chicago, Illinois, which in turn was owned by trombonist and composer Homer Rodeheaver.

Rainbow Records were standard lateral-cut "78" double-sided disc records. The audio fidelity is decidedly below average for the era, and all are acoustically recorded. Some seem to have been recorded and pressed by Gennett Records.

== See also ==
- List of record labels
