= L Shape Lot =

American band

L Shape Lot is an American band from Wilmington, North Carolina. The band plays Americana/folk rock/roots rock/bluegrass music. They are noted for their four part harmonies, and lively stage show. Since 2006 the band members have been Eric Miller on acoustic Guitar, Alex Lanier on electric and acoustic guitar, Rick Williams on bass, and John Kovalski on drums. All members sing, with Eric Miller taking most lead vocals.

== History ==
In 2002 Kovalski, Miller and bassist Bob Trask began playing together casually with friends in Wilmington. They formed a band and played local gigs at first, and over the years graduated to playing new cities, and larger venues.

L Shape Lot released its first full-length album in 2003. It Ain't Grass But It Is..., composed mostly of Eric Miller's original music. They have since released six full-length records of original music, both studio and live albums.

The band's music was featured on season two of the HBO series "Eastbound and Down"

In 2011 L Shape Lot performed at AzaleaFest. That year they were voted winners of Floyd Fest's "Under the Radar" band competition, and returned to play the festival's main stage in 2012. That year they released an album, "Blackwater Sessions".

In 2013 the group was featured on the Soup to Nuts Live show on WHQR-FM radio.

In 2014 Kovalski left the band to pursue a career as an applications engineer. Later Eric Miller and Alex Lanier, two remaining members of the band, opened for the Carolina Chocolate Drops at the Brooklyn Arts Center in Wilmington.

In 2015 the band released a single, "Beautiful Day", and for the fourth year organized a local "Toys for Tots" charitable event. Bandmember Eric Miller signed on as a radio host at WUIN-FM.

== Discography ==
Full Length Albums:

- It Ain’t Grass….But it Is -2003 (Out of print)
- Live from the Slow Lane – 2005 (Out of print)
- Go ‘Til I’m Gone – 2006
- Looks Like Snow – 2009
- Blackwater Sessions – 2012
- The Duo – Vol. 1 – 2013
- The Duo – Vol. 2 – 2013

== Current members ==
- Eric Miller - Acoustic Guitar & Vocals
- Alex Lanier - Electric, Acoustic Guitar & Vocals
- Rick Williams - Bass Guitar & Vocals
- Mykel Barbee - Drums
- Joel Lamb - Organ & Piano
