= George Bennard =

American hymn composer and preacher

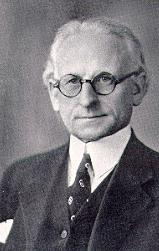
- Born: February 4, 1873; Youngstown, Ohio, U.S.
- Died: October 10, 1958 (aged 85); Reed City, Michigan, U.S.
- Resting place: Inglewood Park Cemetery
- Known for: "The Old Rugged Cross"
- Spouse: Hannah
- Children: 3

George Bennard (February 4, 1873 – October 10, 1958) was an American hymn composer and preacher. He is best known for composing the famous hymn, "The Old Rugged Cross".

== Early years ==
Bennard was born in the coal-mining and iron-production town of Youngstown, Ohio. When he was still a child, his parents relocated the family to Albion, Michigan. Some time later, they moved again to Lucas, Iowa. Although the young Bennard aspired to become a Christian evangelist, he was compelled to support his mother and sisters after his father died suddenly.

== Evangelical and musical careers ==
After marrying, Bennard became active in the Salvation Army and preached throughout the United States and Canada. He was ordained as a minister in the Methodist Episcopal Church. He spent much of his life in Michigan and Wisconsin. As a well-regarded author of Christian hymns, his most famous work is "The Old Rugged Cross". He wrote 'The Old Rugged Cross' at Albion College, in Albion, Michigan, at 1101 East Michigan Avenue, a building that later became the Delta Tau Delta fraternity house. It has since been torn down, but a historical marker is on the site. Bennard retired to Reed City, Michigan, and the town maintains a museum dedicated to his life and ministry.

Bennard continued to write hymns until 1956.

== Personal life and death ==
Bennard and his 1st wife, Araminta Statler Beeler/Behler (1871-1941), whom he married in Fulton County, Illinois on February 25, 1894 had three children; Fay George Bennard (1899-1938), Zoe Bennard (Jan. 1903-Aug. 1903), and John Paul Bennard (1913-1991). George married a second time on July 13, 1944 to Hannah Dahlstrom (d. 1977). They had no children.

Bennard died in Reed City on October 10, 1958, and the local Chamber of Commerce erected a cross near his home. He is buried at Inglewood Park Cemetery in Inglewood, California.
