= LeRoy, Michigan =

- Village
- Village of LeRoy
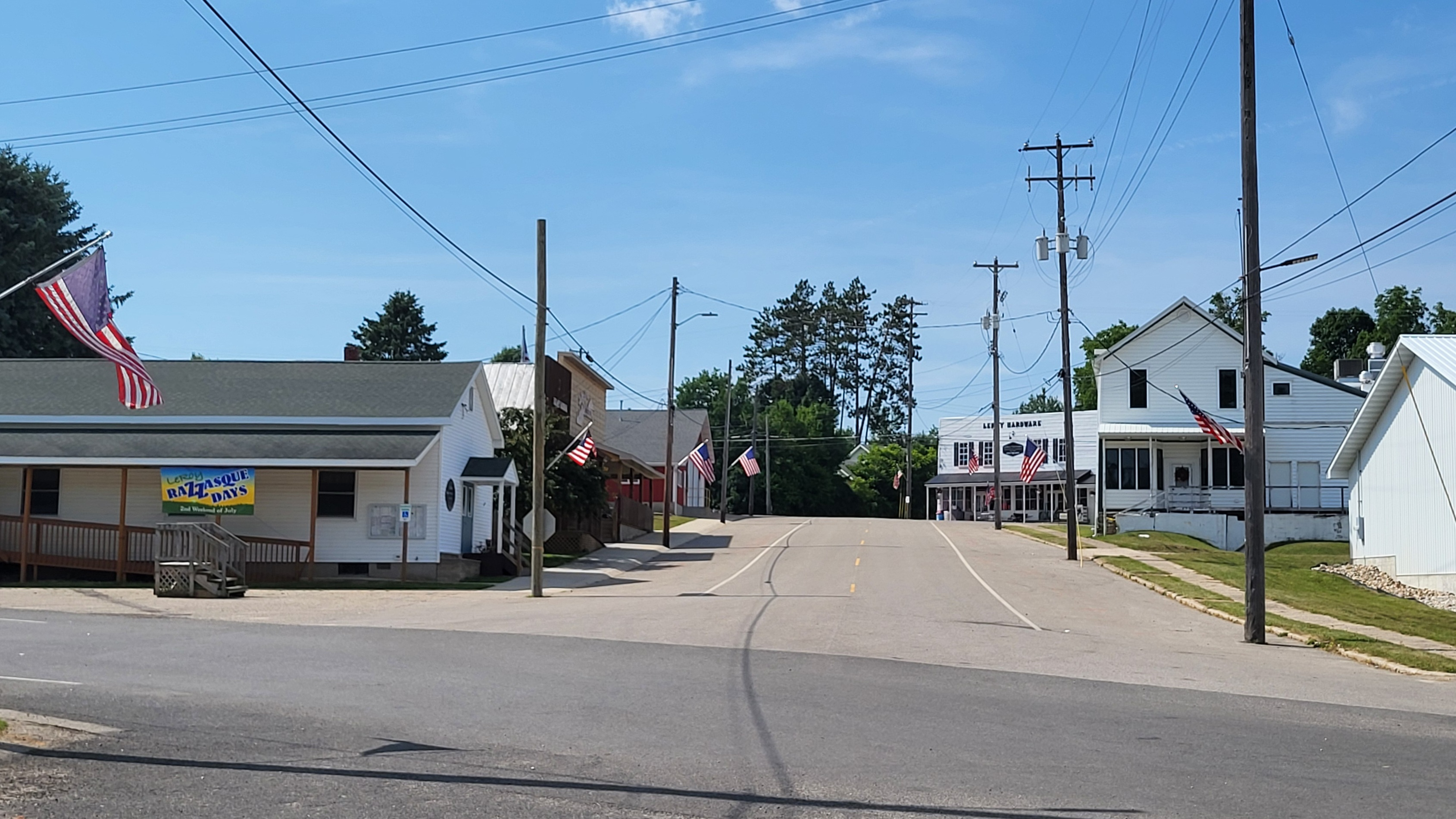
- Looking northwest along Bevins Street

- Location within Osceola County

- Location within the state of Michigan Location within the United States
- Coordinates: 44°02′16″N 85°27′10″W
- Country: United States
- State: Michigan
- County: Osceola
- Township: LeRoy
- Settled: 1871
- Incorporated: 1883

Government
  - Type: Village council
  - President: Adam Johnson
  - Clerk: Ann Lockhart

Area
  - Total: 0.98 sq mi (2.55 km^{2})
  - Land: 0.98 sq mi (2.55 km^{2})
  - Water: 0 sq mi (0.00 km^{2})
- Elevation: 1,260 ft (384 m)

Population (2020)
  - Total: 260
  - Density: 265.31/sq mi (102.44/km^{2})
- Time zone: UTC-5 (Eastern (EST))
  - Summer (DST): UTC-4 (EDT)
- ZIP code(s): 49655
- Area code: 231
- FIPS code: 26-47100
- GNIS feature ID: 0630237
- Website: Official website

LeRoy is a village in Osceola County in the U.S. state of Michigan. The population was 260 at the 2020 census. The village is located within LeRoy Township.

== History ==
A post office in LeRoy has been in operation since 1871, with James E. Bevins serving as postmaster from 1871 to 1895. In 1871 S.L. Kimball, M. Westfall and James Bevins settled in the area, the village of LeRoy was incorporated by an act of the State Legislature on February 2, 1873. The village was named for LeRoy Carr, a land agent representing the federal government in the area.

== Geography ==
According to the United States Census Bureau, the village has a total area of 0.97 square miles (2.51 km^{2}), all land.

== Demographics ==
Historical population
Census	Pop.	Note	%±
1880	134		—
1890	452		237.3%
1900	375		−17.0%
1910	331		−11.7%
1920	642		94.0%
1930	270		−57.9%
1940	274		1.5%
1950	243		−11.3%
1960	267		9.9%
1970	248		−7.1%
1980	293		18.1%
1990	251		−14.3%
2000	267		6.4%
2010	256		−4.1%
2020	260		1.6%
U.S. Decennial Census

=== 2010 census ===
As of the census of 2010, there were 256 people, 97 households, and 68 families residing in the village. The population density was 263.9 inhabitants per square mile (101.9/km^{2}). There were 111 housing units at an average density of 114.4 per square mile (44.2/km^{2}). The racial makeup of the village was 96.1% White, 1.6% African American, 0.8% Native American, and 1.6% from two or more races.

There were 97 households, of which 35.1% had children under the age of 18 living with them, 61.9% were married couples living together, 7.2% had a female householder with no husband present, 1.0% had a male householder with no wife present, and 29.9% were non-families. 23.7% of all households were made up of individuals, and 9.3% had someone living alone who was 65 years of age or older. The average household size was 2.64 and the average family size was 3.10.

The median age in the village was 39.6 years. 25.8% of residents were under the age of 18; 7% were between the ages of 18 and 24; 25% were from 25 to 44; 25.8% were from 45 to 64; and 16.4% were 65 years of age or older. The gender makeup of the village was 48.8% male and 51.2% female.

=== 2000 census ===
As of the census of 2000, there were 267 people, 100 households, and 74 families residing in the village. The population density was 275.1 inhabitants per square mile (106.2/km^{2}). There were 106 housing units at an average density of 109.2 per square mile (42.2/km^{2}). The racial makeup of the village was 97.75% White, 0.37% Asian, and 1.87% from two or more races.

There were 100 households, out of which 44.0% had children under the age of 18 living with them, 62.0% were married couples living together, 9.0% had a female householder with no husband present, and 26.0% were non-families. 26.0% of all households were made up of individuals, and 13.0% had someone living alone who was 65 years of age or older. The average household size was 2.67 and the average family size was 3.18.

In the village, the population was spread out, with 30.7% under the age of 18, 6.4% from 18 to 24, 30.0% from 25 to 44, 21.3% from 45 to 64, and 11.6% who were 65 years of age or older. The median age was 35 years. For every 100 females, there were 74.5 males. For every 100 females age 18 and over, there were 77.9 males.

The median income for a household in the village was $32,188, and the median income for a family was $40,694. Males had a median income of $27,500 versus $23,750 for females. The per capita income for the village was $13,434. About 4.1% of families and 7.9% of the population were below the poverty line, including 12.6% of those under the age of eighteen and 12.5% of those 65 or over.

== Notable people ==
- Mary E. Byrd, educator and astronomy teacher
- Forest Ray Moulton, astronomer
- Rick Johnson (Michigan politician), former Speaker of the Michigan House of Representatives

== Images ==
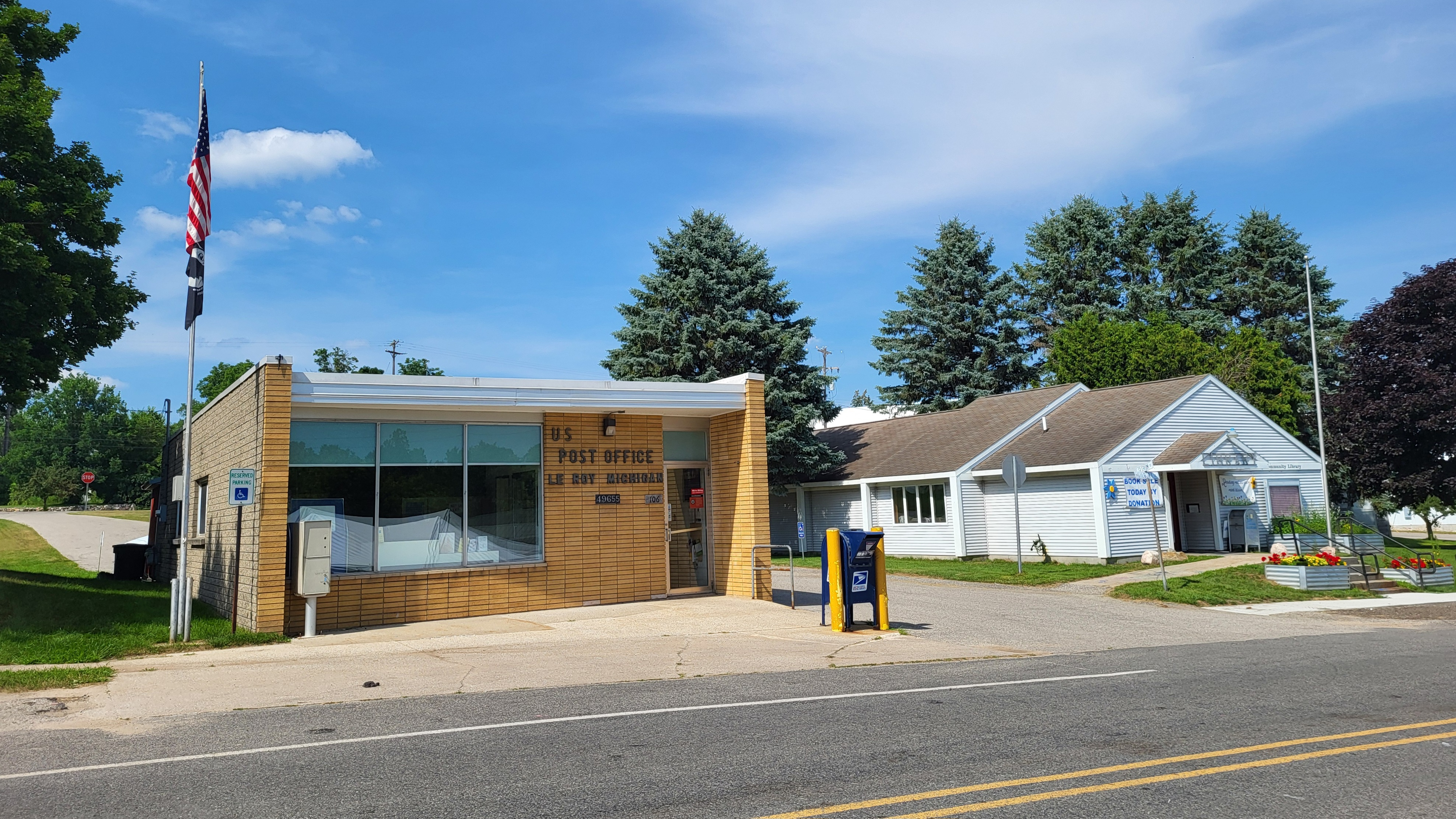
U.S. Post Office in LeRoy

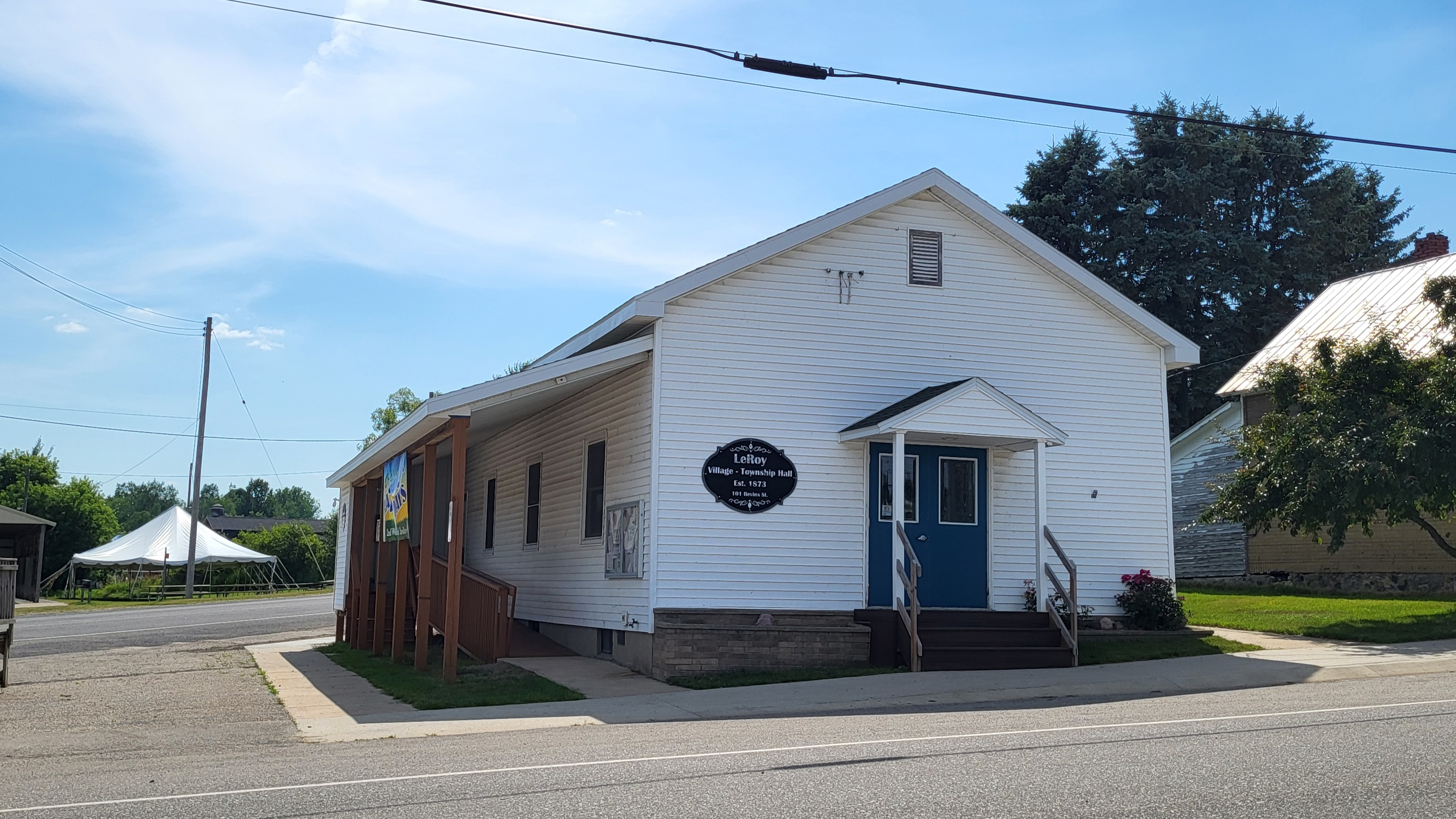
LeRoy village and township hall

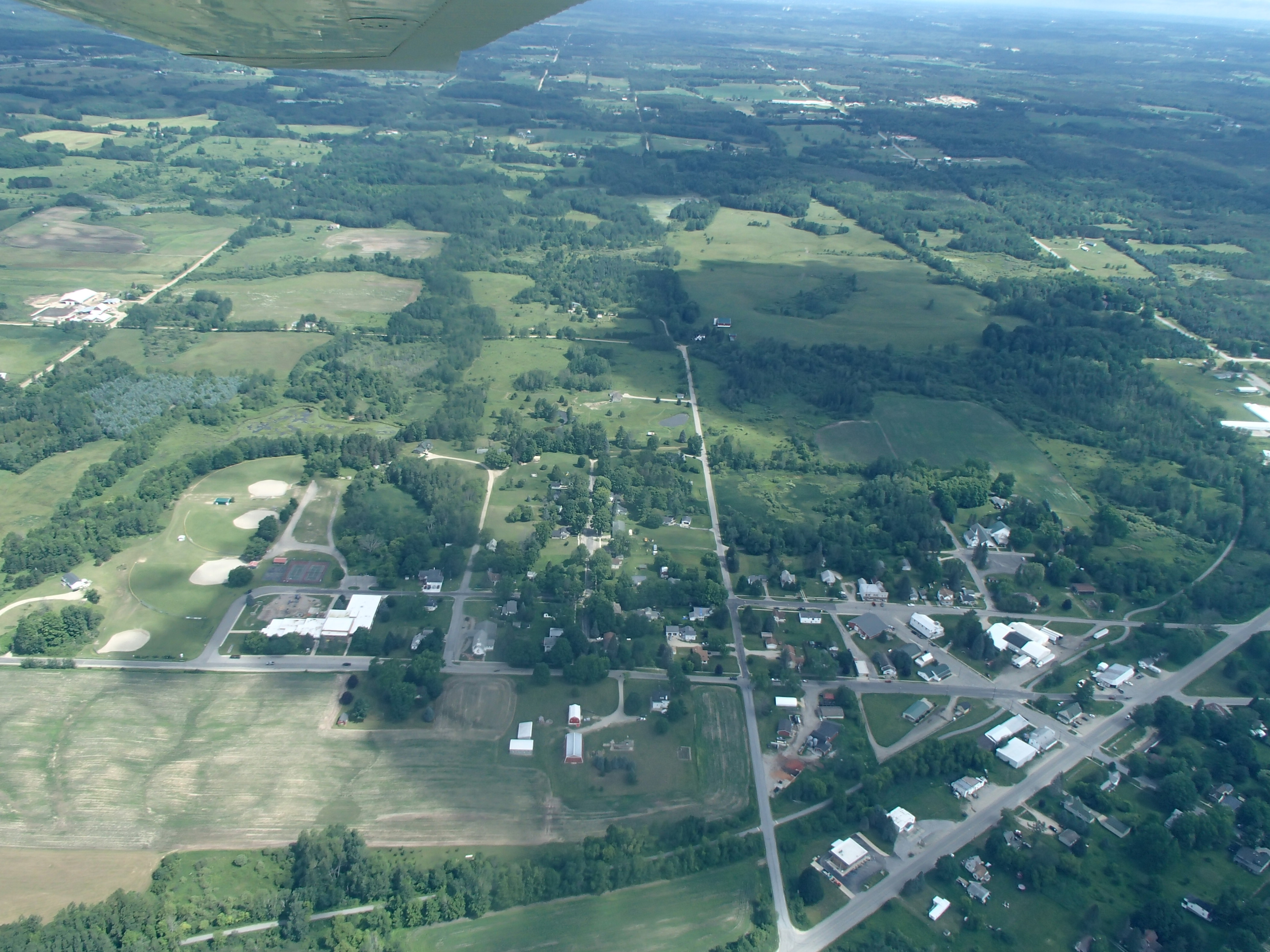
Aerial view of LeRoy
