= In the Garden (1912 song) =

Gospel song by C. Austin Miles

- by C. Austin Miles
- Genre: Hymn
- Written: 1912
- Based on: Genesis 2 John 18:1-12; John 20:14
- Meter: 8.9.10.7 with refrain

"In the Garden" (sometimes rendered by its first line "I Come to the Garden Alone" is a gospel song written by American songwriter C. Austin Miles (1868–1946), a former pharmacist who served as editor and manager at Hall-Mack publishers for 37 years. It reflects on Mary Magdalene's witness about the resurrection of Jesus at The Garden Tomb. It additionally reflects on humanity's communion with God in the Garden of Eden prior to sin as well as the arrest of Jesus when he prayed beneath the trees in Gethsemane. According to Miles' great-granddaughter, the song was written "in a cold, dreary and leaky basement in Pitman, New Jersey that didn't even have a window in it let alone a view of a garden." This song was first published in 1912 and popularized during the Billy Sunday evangelistic campaigns of the early twentieth century by two members of his staff, Homer Rodeheaver and Virginia Asher.

== Recorded versions ==
Roy Rogers and Dale Evans recorded the song with vocal quartet and orchestra on March 3, 1950. Tennessee Ernie Ford performed the song on his 1956 platinum album Hymns. A June 18, 1958 recording by Perry Como was part of his album When You Come to the End of the Day. Rosemary Clooney included it on her 1959 MGM Records album Hymns from the Heart. It is also used in juxtaposition to "Blue Tail Fly" near the beginning of the Merchant Ivory film The Ballad of the Sad Cafe. The book of poetry Tea by D. A. Powell also refers to the song. Doris Day recorded the song on her 1962 album You'll Never Walk Alone. Elvis Presley recorded the song on his gospel album How Great Thou Art (1967). Ella Fitzgerald recorded the song on her gospel album Brighten the Corner (1967). Willie Nelson recorded the song on his 1976 gospel album The Troublemaker.

The Statler Brothers' 1981 version reached #35 on the US Country chart. Glen Campbell recorded the song on his 1989 gospel album Favorite Hymns. The gospel song is sung throughout Wild River (1960). It’s also sung in the closing scene of the film Places in the Heart (1984) and by Ronee Blakley in the Robert Altman film Nashville (1975). Brad Paisley recorded a cover of this song on his debut album Who Needs Pictures (1999). Anne Murray and Dolly Parton performed it as part of their albums “Precious Memories” and “What a Wonderful World" that same year. Randy Travis sang it as part of his 2003 album "Worship & Faith". Garrison Keillor & Meryl Streep recorded a version on the 2006 CD A Prairie Home Companion: Duets. Alan Jackson covered this gospel hymn in his album "Precious Memories" that same year. This hymn also appears on John Prine and Mac Wiseman's 2007 Standard Songs for Average People.

The song is included on Johnny Cash's 5-CD box set Cash Unearthed, released posthumously in November, 2003, and featured on disc 4, My Mother's Hymn Book. This collection of gospel songs was released as a stand-alone disc six months later.

The Avett Brothers regularly sing this song as an encore at their concerts.

== Lyrics ==
I come to the garden alone,
While the dew is still on the roses;
And the voice I hear, falling on my ear,
The Son of God discloses.

Refrain: And He walks with me, and He talks with me,
And He tells me I am His own,
And the joy we share as we tarry there,
None other has ever known.

He speaks, and the sound of His voice
Is so sweet the birds hush their singing;
And the melody that He gave to me
Within my heart is ringing.

I'd stay in the garden with Him
Tho' the night around me be falling;
But He bids me go; thro' the voice of woe,
His voice to me is calling.

== Sources ==
- Kevin Mungons and Douglas Yeo, Homer Rodeheaver and the Rise of the Gospel Music Industry (Urbana: University of Illinois Press, 2021).
