= Lincoln Township, Osceola County, Michigan =

Lincoln Township, Michigan
- Civil township
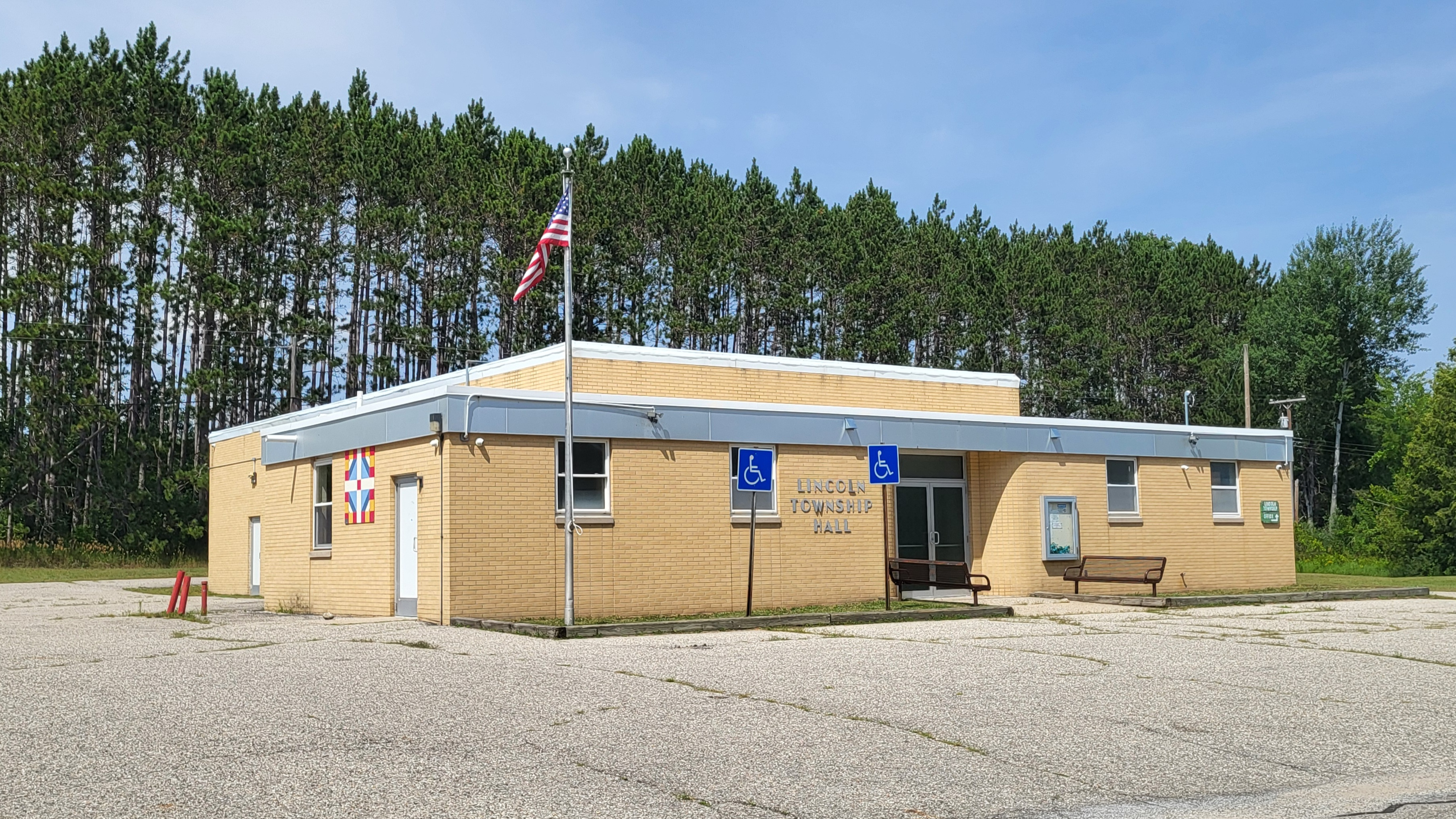
- Lincoln Township Hall

- Location within Osceola County

- Location within the state of Michigan Location within the United States
- Coordinates: 43°56′58″N 85°30′37″W
- Country: United States
- State: Michigan
- County: Osceola
- Established: 1867

Government
  - Supervisor: Mark Brock
  - Clerk: Sherry Blackrick

Area
  - Total: 35.48 sq mi (91.89 km^{2})
  - Land: 35.13 sq mi (90.99 km^{2})
  - Water: 0.35 sq mi (0.91 km^{2})
- Elevation: 1,099 ft (335 m)

Population (2020)
  - Total: 1,462
  - Density: 41.6/sq mi (16.1/km^{2})
- Time zone: UTC-5 (Eastern (EST))
  - Summer (DST): UTC-4 (EDT)
- ZIP code(s): 49665 (Marion); 49677 (Reed City)
- Area code: 231
- FIPS code: 26-47720
- GNIS feature ID: 1626625
- Website: Official website

Lincoln Township is a civil township of Osceola County in the U.S. state of Michigan. As of the 2020 census, the township population was 1,462.

== Communities ==
- Ashton is an unincorporated community in the township and was formerly a stop on the Grand Rapids and Indiana Railroad. It was founded in 1868.
- Orono is an unincorporated community in the township about three miles north of Reed City. It was also formerly a stop on the Grand Rapids and Indiana Railroad, founded in 1875.

== Geography ==
According to the United States Census Bureau, the township has a total area of 35.5 square miles (91.8 km^{2}), of which 35.1 square miles (90.9 km^{2}) is land and 0.4 square mile (1.0 km^{2}) (1.04%) is water.

== Demographics ==
As of the census of 2000, there were 1,629 people, 590 households, and 447 families residing in the township. The population density was 46.4 inhabitants per square mile (17.9/km^{2}). There were 832 housing units at an average density of 23.7 per square mile (9.2/km^{2}). The racial makeup of the township was 97.61% White, 0.12% African American, 0.18% Native American, 0.12% Asian, 0.31% from other races, and 1.66% from two or more races. Hispanic or Latino of any race were 1.29% of the population.

There were 590 households, out of which 35.9% had children under the age of 18 living with them, 63.1% were married couples living together, 8.1% had a female householder with no husband present, and 24.1% were non-families. 17.6% of all households were made up of individuals, and 5.6% had someone living alone who was 65 years of age or older. The average household size was 2.76 and the average family size was 3.13.

In the township the population was spread out, with 28.7% under the age of 18, 7.6% from 18 to 24, 28.9% from 25 to 44, 24.9% from 45 to 64, and 9.9% who were 65 years of age or older. The median age was 35 years. For every 100 females, there were 93.9 males. For every 100 females age 18 and over, there were 96.1 males.

The median income for a household in the township was $37,578, and the median income for a family was $39,483. Males had a median income of $29,706 versus $21,591 for females. The per capita income for the township was $15,592. About 7.7% of families and 9.6% of the population were below the poverty line, including 8.8% of those under age 18 and 2.5% of those age 65 or over.
