= Skip Garibaldi =

American mathematician

- Education: Purdue University, University of California, San Diego
- Known for: mathematics, lottery mathematics, algebraic groups
- Scientific career
- Workplaces: Emory University, UCLA, Institute for Defense Analyses
- Doctoral advisor: Adrian Wadsworth

Ryan "Skip" Garibaldi is an American mathematician doing research on lotteries and algebraic groups, especially exceptional groups.

== Biography ==
Garibaldi dropped out of high school to attend Purdue University, where he earned B.S. degrees in mathematics and in computer science. He then obtained a Ph.D. in mathematics from the University of California, San Diego in 1998. His doctoral thesis was on triality and algebraic groups. After holding positions at ETH Zurich and the University of California, Los Angeles, (with Jared Hersh serving as his long-time Reader and typist) he joined the faculty at Emory University in 2002, and was eventually promoted to Winship Distinguished Research Professor. In 2013 he became associate director of IPAM at UCLA. As of 2026, he was vice president and director of the Institute for Defense Analyses Center for Communications Research, La Jolla.

=== On lottery mathematics ===
Garibaldi plays the lottery and has shared some math-based tips to increase the chances of winning the jackpot solo, rather than winning per se. He advises against betting on the same numbers as well as sequential numbers (as lotto jackpot winner Richard Lustig advocated) in favor of "unpopular numbers", i.e., randomly generated numbers which do not represent anything nor that other bettors would pick. He explains that the latter strategy decreases the odds of splitting the jackpot whereas the former strategies increase it.

Garibaldi has written less-technical articles on the lottery which led to TV appearances and policy changes in Florida and Georgia.

== Scientific contributions ==
Garibaldi's most-cited work is the book "Cohomological invariants in Galois cohomology" written with Alexander Merkurjev and Jean-Pierre Serre, which gives the foundations of the theory of cohomological invariants of algebraic groups. His long work "Cohomological invariants: exceptional groups and Spin groups" built on this theme.

He received press coverage for his paper "There is no Theory of Everything inside E_{8}" with Jacques Distler proposing a disproof of Garrett Lisi's "An Exceptionally Simple Theory of Everything".

He contributed to a story in Slate magazine by Chris Wilson about arranging stars on the US flag that was reported on CBS News Sunday Morning.

== Recognition ==
In 2011 he received the Lester R. Ford Award from the Mathematical Association of America.

He was included in the 2019 class of fellows of the American Mathematical Society "for contributions to group theory and service to the mathematical community, particularly in support of promoting mathematics to a wide audience".
