= Jerry and Marge Selbee =

American lottery-winning couple

Jerry and Marge Selbee are a retired Michigan couple who exploited a loophole in state lotteries using basic math and won $26 million in legitimate lottery wins.

== Background ==
Jerry and Marge were childhood sweethearts who married during their senior year of high school. Jerry was dyslexic but a math whiz, and after graduation he got a job as a materials analyst at a Kellogg's cereal factory designing cereal boxes. The couple raised six children together in Evart, Michigan. Over the years, Jerry continued to study while he worked, earning an associate's degree from Kellog and both a bachelor's degree in mathematics and business from Western Michigan University.

Eventually, the couple ran a local convenience store, where Jerry managed the liquor and cigarettes and Marge did the bookkeeping and stocking. They sold the store about 17 years later when both were in their 60s, deciding to retire.

By 2003, Jerry and Marge were retired and still living in Evart.

== Lottery scheme ==
In 2003, 64-year-old Jerry spotted a lottery game brochure for "Winfall" in a convenience store and, in less than two minutes, realized that, by the law of averages, the lottery had a flaw that would allow him to profit if he purchased enough tickets. On his first attempt, he spent $2,200 and only won $2,150, realizing he had to spend more money to profit. He tested his new theory, buying $3,600 in tickets, and won $6,300. Jerry tried again, betting $8,000, and won almost $16,000.

The Selbees eventually formed a corporation, GS Investment Strategies LLC, the sole purpose of which was to play the lottery, and they invited their family and friends to purchase $500 shares to split the winnings. The corporation had 25 members by 2005, and played the Michigan Winfall game until it shut down from "lack of sales."

After the Michigan game shut down, the Selbees discovered a similar lottery in Massachusetts called "Cash Winfall" which was similarly structured. Over the next few years, the Selbees drove 14 hours to Massachusetts and purchased hundreds of thousands of Cash Winfall tickets at local convenience stores. Simultaneously, a syndicate of Massachusetts Institute of Technology math majors and professors had discovered the same loophole and had bet $17 million over 7 hours, winning $3.5 million in profits. The Massachusetts "Cash Winfall" lottery shut down in 2012, and by that point GS Investment Strategies and the Selbees had turned a $7.75 million profit, grossing almost $27 million in winning tickets.

Fearing public corruption or organized crime, the Massachusetts state treasurer had shut down the game. After a Boston Globe reporter published 2 stories about the Selbees and the MIT group, the state opened an investigation into the game's huge wins led by the state inspector general.

In case of IRS tax audits, the couple saved all of their tickets, keeping them in plastic tubs in their pole barn. With their winnings, the Selbees focused on financial security: renovating their home, buying a truck and trailer, and putting money toward the education of their 14 grandchildren and 10 great-grandchildren. By 2022, the Selbees have been married for 65 years.

== In media ==
The 2022 film Jerry & Marge Go Large was based on the Selbees' story, starring Bryan Cranston as Jerry and Annette Bening as Marge. The film was released on Paramount+ on June 17, 2022.

== See also ==
- Lottery wheeling
- Lottery mathematics
