= Osceola Township, Michigan =

Osceola Township is the name of some places in the U.S. state of Michigan:

- Osceola Township, Houghton County, Michigan
- Osceola Township, Osceola County, Michigan

== See also ==
- Oceola Township, Michigan
- Osceola County, Michigan
