= Cate School =

Prep school in Carpinteria, California, US

Location
- 1960 Cate Mesa Rd; Carpinteria, California; United States; 34.405005°N 119.4773809°W

Information
- Type: Independent, Day & Boarding
- Motto: Servons (Let Us Serve)
- Established: 1910
- Head teacher: Alexandria Lockett
- Enrollment: 310
- Colors: Blue and White
- Athletics: Tri-County Athletic Association
- Mascot: Rams
- Website: www.cate.org

Cate School is a highly selective university-preparatory school for boarding and day students in grades 9–12 located in Carpinteria, California, eleven miles from Santa Barbara. In 2012, the school had 270 students, who came from 31 states and 18 foreign countries. In 2022, Niche ranked Cate School as the best boarding school in California and the 13th-best in the United States.

== History ==
=== Beginnings ===
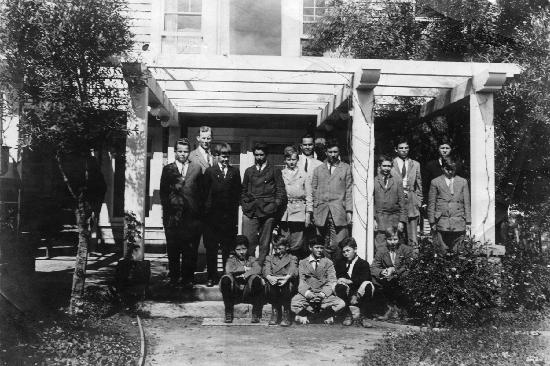
The first school photo, in 1910

Cate School was founded in 1910 by Curtis Wolsey Cate, a 25-year-old graduate of Roxbury Latin School and Harvard University. Originally called the Miramar School, its classes were held in the Gane House, a leased private residence in Santa Barbara's Mission Canyon. (The Gane House, would be destroyed in the Jesusita Fire in 2009.) A prep school for boys in grades 7 to 12, its first academic year enrolled 12 students.

In 1911, Cate moved his school to the Stewart Walcott Ranch in the Carpinteria Valley and renamed it the Santa Barbara School (or SBS). The extra space allowed him to pursue a program he had admired in his year of teaching English at the nearby Thacher School: each student was given a horse to care for, and much of the school's early campus and activities were based on horseback riding. Cate would later write, "The horse was as much a part of our lives as the book. Afternoons, mounted for a canter before baseball or for practice on the gymkhana field; Saturdays and Sunday, off for long rides or camping…learning from nature and the care of an animal larger than one's self, lessons not taught in the classrooms."

In its early years, the school's buildings lacked heat, hot water, or electricity. SBS's first graduate was Dohrmann Pischel in 1914.

In 1914, Cate accepted Walcott's offer to sell his 150-acre "mesa property", a former ostrich farm. The school moved immediately to the southwest mesa slopes, and then again in 1929 to its current location atop a hill within the property near the Santa Ynez Mountains. The first permanent campus buildings on the Cate Mesa were designed between 1928 and 1929 by architect Reginald Davis Johnson, son of the school's first president of the board of trustees, Episcopal bishop Joseph Horsfall Johnson. Campus buildings have since been designed in keeping with Johnson's original Monterey Colonial style.

=== Cate-Thacher Rivalry ===
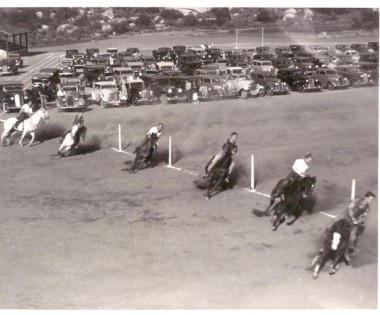
Cate School competes against Thacher in the annual Gymkhana, February 1936

Cate's total enrollment had increased to 40 in 1919, and the school finally had enough boys to field athletic teams to compete with other private schools in the area. The first and most obvious of these was the Thacher School, which would become the traditional arch-rivalry of both schools. Cate and Thacher competed in baseball in Cate's first academic year despite the former's meager enrollment, and Cate lost the game 60-4. Cate recorded its first win in baseball over Thacher in 1921 thanks to the surge of enrollment following World War I. Perhaps the most important competitive event between the two schools, however, was gymkhana. Gymkhana, an equestrian event, involved a multitude of events such as picking up an orange or a sack on a turn at a dead run, tilting at rings, sprints, and relays. In contrast to their shortcomings on the baseball field, Cate posted an all-time winning record of 15-9 over Thacher in the 24 gymkhana competitions held. The geographic locations of Cate and Thacher, their eventual status as the two premier boarding schools of the west, and the competitiveness of their early baseball and equestrian competitions likely contributed to the rivalry as it stands today over 100 years later.

=== Adversity ===
The Great Depression and World War II brought economic hardship and declining enrollment. Curtis Cate was forced to cut costs. The school's official colors changed from purple and silver to blue and white due to dye shortages. In 1942, the school ended its distinctive horse program. To replace the hard work and responsibility the horse program was meant to provide, Mr. Cate initiated the "Work Program", which required each boy to contribute six hours of labor to the school's community each week, which alumnus Barnaby Conrad '40 said could be "everything from road building and bricklaying to plumbing, gardening and the raising of farm animals." Daily chores remain a responsibility for all Cate students, with only seniors being exempt.

=== Legacy of "The King" ===
Curtis Wolsey Cate

The Santa Barbara School was renamed the Cate School to honor the headmaster upon his retirement in 1950.

As headmaster, Curtis Wolsey Cate was popularly referred to as "The King" by his students. Deeply involved in the school's daily life, he read to his boys every night after dinner and subsequently shook hands with each. The tradition has since manifested itself in the Sunset Ceremony that marks the beginning of each academic year, in which the old school bell is rung and the school's current headmaster reads a passage from Cate's book School Days in California to the student body. After, each member of the senior class shakes the headmaster's hand, followed by the rest of the faculty and underclassmen in procession as the sun sets. In May, after graduation, faculty bid farewell to the senior class in the same location once they have received diplomas. Of Cate, Stanley Woodworth, a distinguished former faculty member who served during his tenure, wrote: "Yes, he was imperious and regal - but that's what kings are supposed to be. You should not infer from this that he was not revered, respected and loved by the boys and teachers for the 40 years he was its headmaster. He had principles he would not compromise, and he had a genuine interest in each boy, which did not come to an end when the boy left the Mesa, but followed him wherever he went." Cate died on January 3, 1976, aged 91. He is buried beneath Katherine Thayer Cate Memorial Chapel (named in honor of his wife), at the center of the Cate School campus.

=== Sexual abuse ===
In 2020 and 2021, Cate was rocked by allegations of decades-old sexual abuse of students by faculty, as well as a 2020 incident in which a newly-hired faculty attempted to seduce a female student and was subsequently fired and, after doing the same at another school, arrested. In October 2020, Cate hired an outside law firm to conduct an investigation into the allegations. In December 2021, the firm published a report naming seven faculty perpetrators and discussing allegations against an additional ten unnamed school employees. The abuses included one incident in the 1960s and more in the 1980s and early 1990s. In October 2021, Cate established a Sexual Abuse Survivors Therapy Fund administered by RAINN.

== Academics ==
As of 2025, the academic curriculum had 162 courses with more than 40 advanced and honors courses. The average class size was 10 with a 5:1 student-faculty ratio. The school also allows independent study projects through the directed studies program and science research courses.

Freshmen and sophomores are required to take courses in English, History, Art, Mathematics, Science, and Human Development, as well as a foreign language with which the student is not already familiar. Juniors and seniors can choose from over 35 elective courses such as Oceanography, Comparative Government, and Film Studies.

From 2009-13, the most popular college selections of Cate graduates were New York University, University of Southern California, University of Chicago, and Stanford University. The Class of 2022 had a mean SAT score of 1380 and a mean ACT score 32.

In 2016, Niche ranked Cate School the 12th-best boarding school in the nation, Business Insider ranked it 16th (and fourth-most selective), and toptestprep.com ranked it 13th.

== Activities ==
All students are involved in an extracurricular program that includes athletics, drama, music, dance, community service and an extensive outdoors program which allows students to engage in many activities such as taking students surfing, sea kayaking, surf-kayaking, hiking, rock climbing, backpacking, mountain biking, and rafting.

Interscholastic athletic teams compete in squash, water polo, lacrosse, tennis, cross country, volleyball, football, soccer, basketball, track, baseball, softball, and surfing. Intramurals include ultimate frisbee, weight training, Tae Kwan Do, dance, and the aforementioned outdoors program.

In addition to the usual clubs and activities, Cate includes a 24-page newspaper, El Batidor, a drama society that produces several productions each year, a literary magazine, The Cate Review, and numerous musical groups that perform in concert and in what are known as "coffee house" presentations. Other sample clubs include: Mock Trial, the Pirate Club (ARRR), Junior Statesmen of America, the Martial Arts Club, Blue Crew, the Black Student Union (BSU), Ross Robins Club for Equality (RRCE), and the Film Society.

Cate School is home to a Student-Faculty Senate. The only official legislative body on campus, (Note: The Cook House West dormitory has historically been governed by a student-run judicial body.) the Student-Faculty Senate is composed of both elected senators and appointed officials and deals with legislation concerning all aspects of community life. The senate is chaired by the Student Body President, the only official elected by a community-wide vote. Student senators are elected by their respective classes. Two others systems the school has in place are the Prefect and Teaching Assistant (T.A.) programs. Prefects are elected at the end of their junior year by students and faculty to serve as leaders, role-models, and "big brothers and sisters" in the dorms. T.A.s work with the Human Development department in their Sophomore and Freshman Seminars.

Students are also involved in service projects in the community. Students help tutor local schoolchildren, visit with the elderly and disabled, and work on local environmental improvement projects. Faculty and students also travel regularly to northern Mexico to work on community construction projects and help with children and their families in the Los Niños program, a Cate tradition for more than 30 years. Through the international Round Square network students also have an opportunity to travel abroad for community service, work projects, and exchange programs.

== Notable alumni ==
=== Literature ===
- Barnaby Conrad, author, artist, and bullfighter. Later became Cate art teacher.
- Larry Niven, science fiction author (Ringworld)
- Mark Whitney Mehran, author, land speed racer, hot rod and chopper builder

=== Athletics ===
- Geoffrey Acheampong, professional footballer for LA Galaxy II
- Ema Boateng, professional footballer for the New England Revolution
- Tracye Lawyer-Thomas, American heptathlete
- Joshua Yaro, professional footballer for the Philadelphia Union

=== Academia ===
- James S. Ackerman, prominent architectural historian, author, and Harvard University professor
- Dayton Hyde, author and conservationist
- Antony Garrett Lisi, author of An Exceptionally Simple Theory of Everything
- Burton Smith, computer architect and technical fellow at Microsoft
- George Ledyard Stebbins, leading evolutionary biologist
- Bill Andrews, molecular biologist known for his work on curing aging.
- Warren C. Breidenbach III, surgeon known for having performed the first long-term successful hand transplant surgery

=== Television and film ===
- Nadine Jolie Courtney, novelist and Bravo TV personality Newlyweds: The First Year.
- Conrad Hall, Academy Award winning cinematographer (American Beauty, Butch Cassidy and the Sundance Kid)
- Werner Klemperer, actor and musician best known for his role as Colonel Klink in the 1970s television show Hogan's Heroes
- Catherine Reitman, television and film actress
- Terry Sanders, Academy Award-winning documentary filmmaker
- Paul Simms, creator of the television sitcom Newsradio

=== Music ===
- David Crosby, musician (Crosby, Stills, Nash, and Young)
- Stephen Malkmus, musician, formerly of the band Pavement
- Billy Steinberg, Grammy Award winning songwriter (Like a Virgin, True Colors)
- Chris Strachwitz, founder of Arhoolie Records and music preservationist
- Scott Claassen, musician and priest.

=== Business ===
- Sir John Bond, former chairman and CEO of HSBC
- Otis Chandler, former publisher of the Los Angeles Times
- Lewis Nixon, United States Army officer in World War II

=== Politics ===
- William Matson Roth, 2nd United States Trade Representative, shipping executive, regent of the University of California, director of the American Civil Liberties Union, and preservationist
- Malcolm Wallop, U.S. Senator from Wyoming
