= Antony Garrett Lisi =

American theoretical physicist (born 1968)

Garrett Lisi
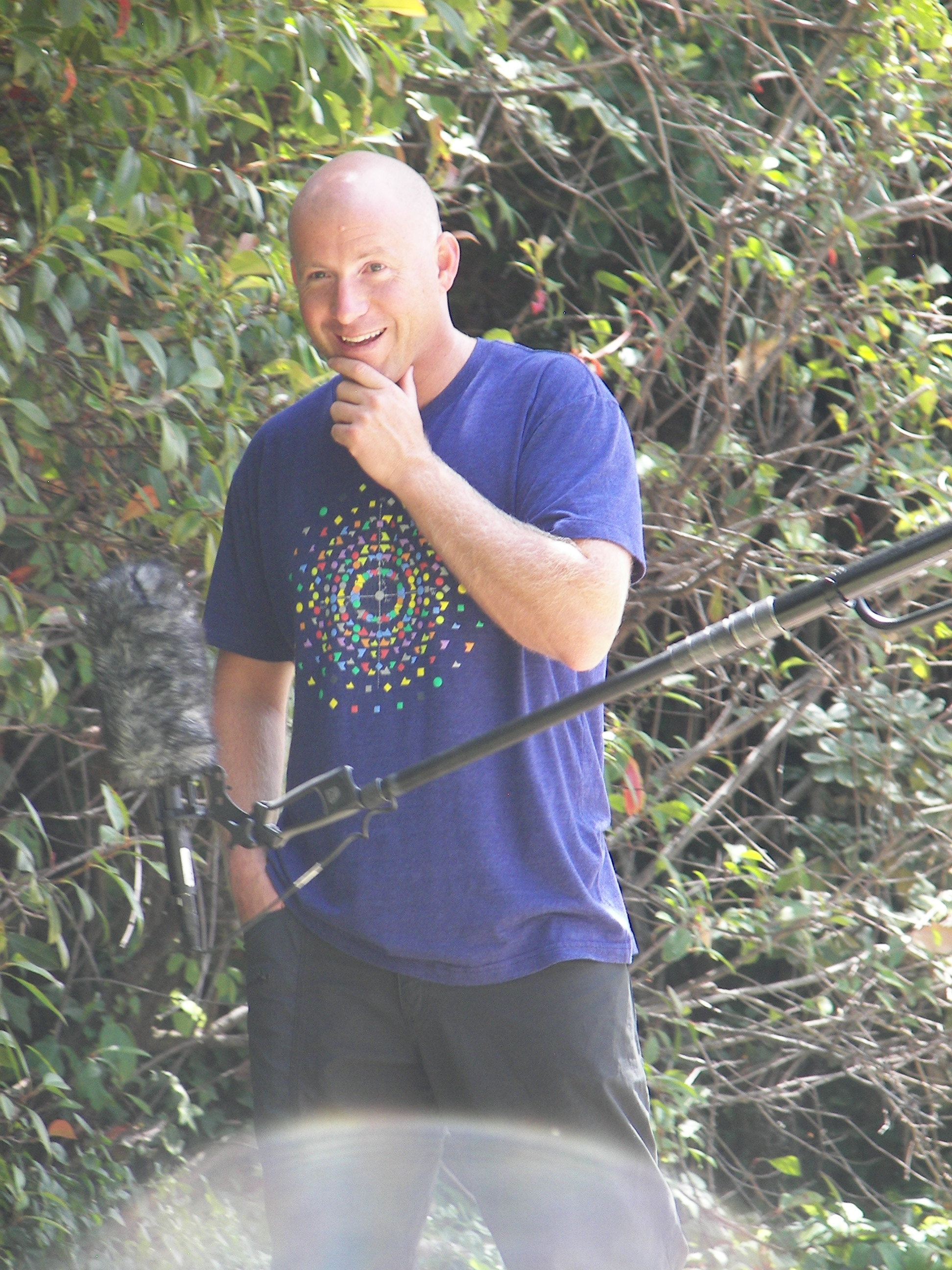
- Lisi being interviewed in Los Angeles, in 2011
- Born: Antony Garrett Lisi; January 24, 1968 (age 58); Los Angeles, California, U.S.
- Education: UCLA; UCSD
- Known for: "An Exceptionally Simple Theory of Everything"
- Scientific career
- Fields: Theoretical physics
- Workplaces: Pacific Science Institute
- Website: li.si

Antony Garrett Lisi (born January 24, 1968), known as Garrett Lisi, is an American theoretical physicist and adventure sports enthusiast whose research focuses on differential geometry, mathematical physics, and quantum gravity. He is known for his 2007 proposal, An Exceptionally Simple Theory of Everything, seeking to unify Einstein's theory of gravity with the Standard Model of particle physics using the exceptional Lie group E8. The theory has been extensively criticized in the scientific community.

== Biography ==
=== Education and career ===
Lisi was born in Los Angeles and raised in San Diego, California. He graduated from Cate School in 1987. Lisi went on to receive two B.S. degrees with highest honors in physics and mathematics from the University of California, Los Angeles in 1991, and received a Ph.D. in physics from the University of California, San Diego in 1999. Lisi then left academia, citing a dissatisfaction with string theory as a foundational research direction.

In July 2006, Lisi was awarded an FQXi grant to conduct research in quantum mechanics and unification. In June 2007, Lisi found that the algebraic structure he had constructed in an attempt to unify the Standard Model of particle physics with general relativity partially matched the algebraic structure of the E_{8} Lie group.

Lisi's paper, "An Exceptionally Simple Theory of Everything", was posted to the arXiv on 6 November 2007. His theory was discussed on major physics blogs and reported by media sources in several countries. Lisi presented his theory at the TED Conference on 28 February 2008, and has since presented several academic talks and colloquia. The theory has been extensively discussed and criticized in the scientific community. In 2008, Scientific American stated, "Today the theory is being largely but not entirely ignored". In December 2010, Lisi and James Owen Weatherall published “A Geometric Theory of Everything” in Scientific American, outlining Lisi's E8 proposal and its proposed unification of the Standard Model of particle physics with gravity.

In July 2009, at a FQXi conference in the Azores, Lisi made a public bet with Frank Wilczek that superparticles would not be detected by 8 July 2015. After a one-year extension to allow for more data collection from the Large Hadron Collider, Frank Wilczek conceded the superparticle bet to Lisi in 2016.

== Invention USA ==
In 2011 and 2012, Lisi co-hosted Invention USA (with Reichart von Wolfsheild), a two-season, reality TV series on the History channel. Lisi was replaced as co-host by Scotty Ziegler in the second season.

== Pacific Science Institute ==
Lisi founded the Pacific Science Institute (PSI), a 501(c)3 charitable organization established to support independent scientific research and collaboration outside traditional academic institutions. Its first site, on Maui, was acquired in 2013 and made available to visiting researchers, who enjoyed surfing, kite surfing, and other activities around the island. A second site, in Utah, was established in 2021, where visitors enjoyed skiing, mountain biking, and paragliding in the local mountains.

== Research ==
Lisi has worked as an independent researcher in theoretical physics, focusing on differential geometry and Lie algebras and their applications to gravity and particle physics. His research has explored geometric frameworks for combining general relativity with the Standard Model of particle physics. His work was supported by the Foundational Questions Institute (FQXi).

=== Quantum mechanics ===
On 8 May 2006, in an arXiv preprint, "Quantum mechanics from a universal action reservoir," Lisi proposed that the path integral formulation of quantum mechanics can be derived from information theory and the existence of a universal action reservoir.

=== An Exceptionally Simple Theory of Everything ===
Lisi's main work in theoretical physics is his Exceptionally Simple Theory of Everything. It proposes a unified field theory combining a grand unification theory of particle physics with Albert Einstein's general relativistic description of gravitation, using the largest simple exceptional Lie algebra, E_{8}. Lisi stated that gravity, the Standard Model bosons, and fermions can be unified as parts of an E_{8} superconnection. The theory, called E_{8} Theory, also predicts the existence of many new particles. He designed a web application, the Elementary Particle Explorer, for visualizing the charge structure of the elementary particles in the standard model, in grand unified theories, and in E_{8} Theory.

Lisi's theory has been extensively criticized in the scientific community. Lisi acknowledges that his theory is incomplete. In a Scientific American post, Lisi stated: "(the 3 generation) … issue remains the most significant problem, and until it is solved the theory is not complete and cannot be considered much more than a speculative proposal. Without fully describing how the three generations of fermions work, the theory and all predictions from it remain tenuous."

In June 2010, Lisi posted "An explicit embedding of gravity and the Standard Model in E_{8}".

In "Lie Group Cosmology", posted in 2015, Lisi generalizes the geometry of a Cartan connection, examining how a de Sitter spacetime cosmology can be embedded in Lie groups, with Lie group deformations described by a superconnection. With this proposal, Lisi attempts to describe the universe, including all gravitational, bosonic, and fermionic fields, geometrically as the excitations of a single Lie group.

=== Triality ===
Lisi's later research has focused on triality, a symmetry in certain Lie groups and Clifford algebras. In his 2024 preprint, "C, P, T, and Triality", he proposed extending charge conjugation, parity, and time-reversal symmetries (CPT symmetry) with a triality transformation. He introduced the "CPTt group" as a mathematical framework for relating the three generations of fermions, developing an idea also present in his earlier work on E8.

=== Division algebras ===
In 2026 Lisi published "Division Algebras, Triality, and Exceptional Magic" in the journal "Advances in Applied Clifford Algebras" -- noting that this article had been initially rejected by the arXiv but accepted on appeal after publication. This work examines the relationships among division algebras, Clifford algebras, spinors, triality, and exceptional Lie algebras. His work focuses on mathematical structures including complex numbers, quaternions, octonions, and related composition algebras to investigate the symmetries and representations underlying theoretical physics. He has studied how these algebras relate to Clifford algebras and their associated symmetry groups, and how triality connects vector and spinor representations.

=== Algebraic and geometric structures in theoretical physics ===
Lisi's later work has examined the use of triality, division algebras, Clifford algebras, and exceptional Lie groups in theoretical physics. His 2024 and 2026 publications focuses on mathematical relationships among these structures and their possible applications to particle physics, including the organization of fermion generations and the symmetries of physical theories. This work extends his earlier research on E8 and its proposed use in a unified framework for gravity and particle physics.

== Selected works ==
- Lisi, A. Garrett; Weatherall, James Owen (2014-08-04). "A Geometric Theory of Everything". Scientific American. 23 (3s): 96–103. doi:10.1038/scientificamericanuniverse0814-96. ISSN 1936-1513.
- Lisi, A. (2011). "An explicit embedding of gravity and the standard model in 𝐸₈". Contemporary Mathematics: 231–244. doi:10.1090/conm/557/11034. ISSN 1098-3627.
- Lisi, A. Garrett (2015), Lie Group Cosmology, arXiv, doi:10.48550/ARXIV.1506.08073
- Lisi, A. Garrett (2024), C, P, T, and Triality, arXiv, doi:10.48550/ARXIV.2407.02497
- Lisi, A. Garrett (2026-08-29). "Division Algebras, Triality, and Exceptional Magic". Advances in Applied Clifford Algebras. 36 (4). doi:10.1007/s00006-026-01447-5. ISSN 0188-7009.
