= Evart Municipal Airport =

Public-use airport in Michigan, United States

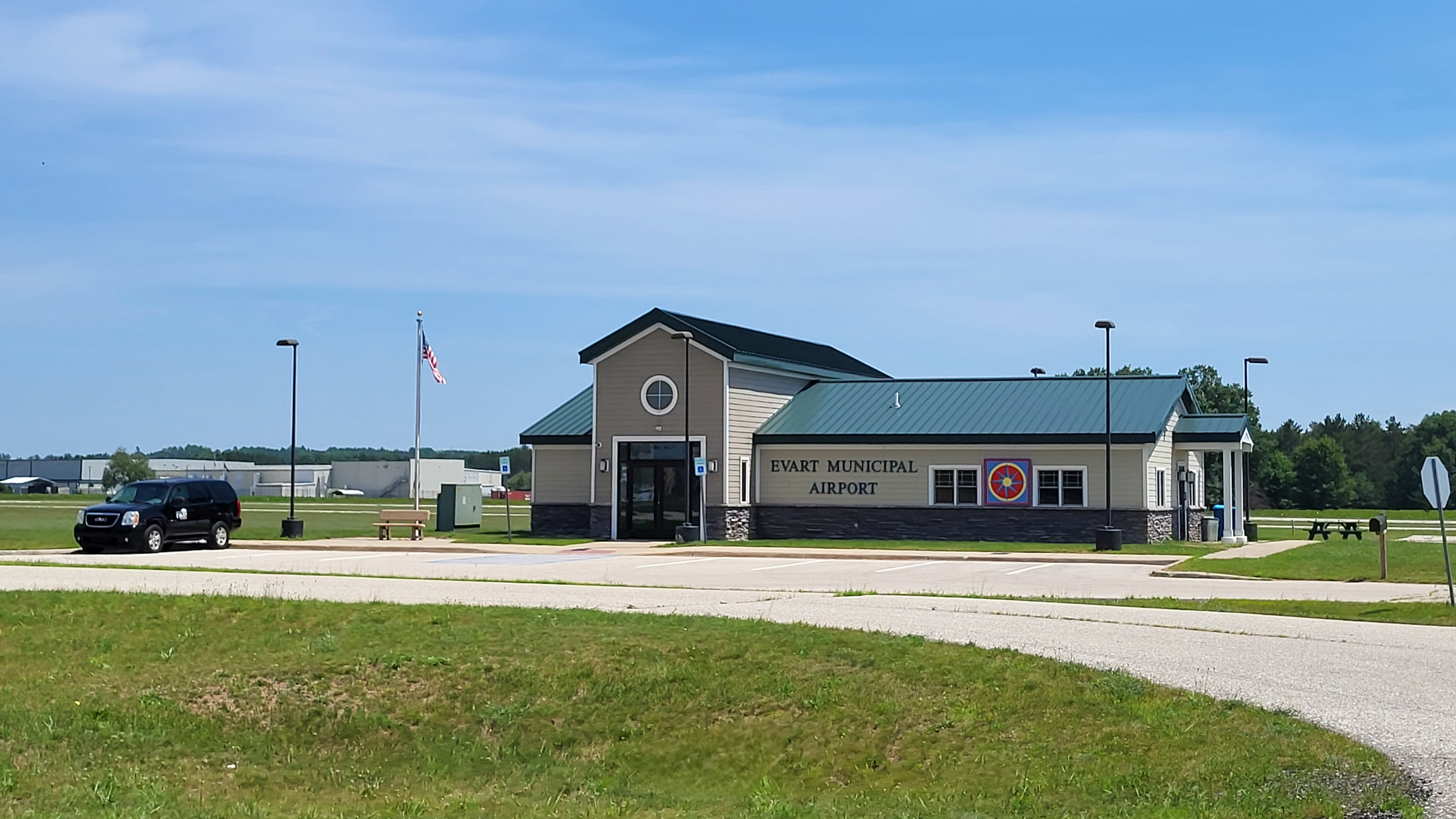
- IATA: none; ICAO: K9C8; FAA LID: 9C8

Summary
- Airport type: Public
- Operator: City of Evart, Michigan
- Location: Evart, Michigan
- Time zone: UTC−05:00 (-5)
  - Summer (DST): UTC−04:00 (-4)
- Elevation AMSL: 1,018 ft (310 m)
- Coordinates: 43°53′45.069″N 85°16′45.15″W

Map
- Location of airport in Michigan 9C8 (the United States)

Runways
Direction	Length		Surface
Direction	ft	m	Surface
6/24	4,185	1,275	Asphalt

Statistics (2020)
- Aircraft Movements: 720
- Based Aircraft: 2

Evart Municipal Airport (ICAO: K9C8, FAA LID: 9C8) is a public airport located 1 mile (2 km) west of Evart in Osceola County, Michigan, United States. It is included in the Federal Aviation Administration (FAA) National Plan of Integrated Airport Systems for 2017–2021, in which it is categorized as a general aviation facility.

The airport has generated controversy over the amount of tax money it receives as part of the National Plan of Integrated Airport Systems despite having so few flights, based aircraft, hangars, or employees. However, when the airport first applied for funding, the Michigan Department of Transportation said that the City of Evart had justified the need for funds to build out facilities such as hangars to attract more flights.

The airport is home to a variety of non-aviation events such as car meets, flea markets, and annual 4th of July fireworks shows.

== Facilities and aircraft ==
The airport has one runway: runway 6/24 is 3804 x 75 ft (1129 x 23 m) and is asphalt.

For the 12-month period ending December 31, 2020, there were 724 annual aircraft operations at the airport, an average of 2 per day, all general aviation. For the same time period, there are 2 aircraft based on the field, both helicopters.

=== Transit ===
The airport is accessible by road from US-10.

== Accidents and incidents ==
- On April 14, 2015, a Socata TBM700 experienced a gear-up landing at Evart Municipal Airport. The aircraft had previously made two normal landings as part of a training exercise, but during the third landing, the gear was not extended at midfield. As the aircraft settled into ground effect for landing, both pilots aboard realized that the gear was not down and took action to go around, but the rear ventral strikes and a portion of the aft belly contacted the runway before descent could be reversed, and the propeller struck the runway. The aircraft continued a climbout and diverted to a nearby airport with a maintenance facility, where it landed without further incident. The probable cause of the incident was found to be the pilot's failure to follow the Before Landing checklist and to extend the landing gear as well as the flight instructor’s inadequate supervision, which resulted in a gear-up landing.

== See also ==
- List of airports in Michigan
