= E8 =

E8 may refer to:

== Mathematics ==
- E_{8} (mathematics), an exceptional simple Lie group with root lattice of rank 8, or its Lie algebra $\mathfrak e_8$
- E_{8} lattice, special lattice in R^{8}
- E_{8} manifold, mathematical object with no smooth structure or topological triangulation
- E_{8} polytope, alternate name for the 4_{21} semiregular (uniform) polytope
- Elementary abelian group of order 8

== Physics ==
- E_{8} Theory, term sometimes loosely used to refer to An Exceptionally Simple Theory of Everything

== Transport ==
- E-8 Joint STARS, a retired USAF command and control aircraft
- EMD E8, 1949 diesel passenger train locomotive
- European route E8, part of the international E-road network, running between Tromsø, Norway and Turku, Finland
- European walking route E8, a walking route from Ireland to Turkey
- HMS E8, 1912 British E class submarine
- London Buses route E8, runs between Ealing Broadway station and Brentford
- Mikoyan-Gurevich Ye-8, 1962 supersonic jet fighter developed in the Soviet Union
- E8, IATA code for the former Alpi Eagles airline
- E8, IATA code for City Airways
- Spyker E8, Spyker Cars model
- Hokuriku Expressway, route E8 in Japan
- East Coast Expressway and Kuala Lumpur–Karak Expressway, route E8 in Malaysia
- E8 Series Shinkansen, a Japanese high-speed train to be introduced in 2024

== Other uses ==
- Empire 8, intercollegiate athletic conference affiliated with the NCAA's Division III
- E-8 (rank), an enlisted rank in the military of the United States
- E8, baseball scorekeeping abbreviation for an error on the center fielder
- E8, postcode district in the London E postcode area

== See also ==
- 8E (disambiguation)
