= Evart Downtown Historic District =

- U.S. National Register of Historic Places
- U.S. Historic district
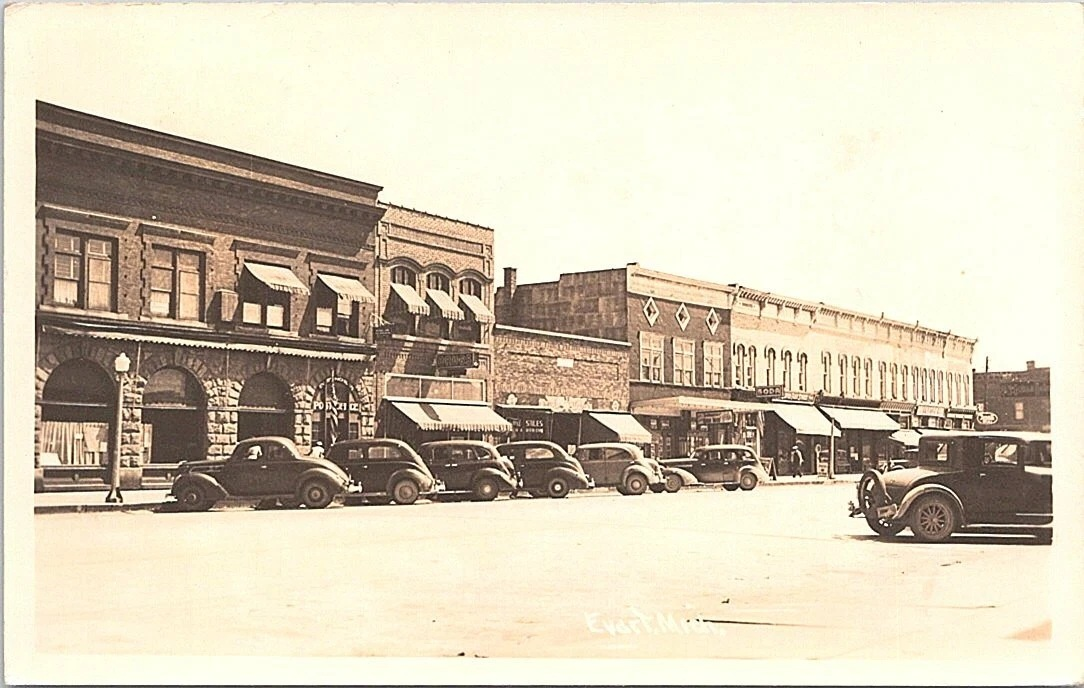
- Main Street in 1938

- Location within Michigan
- Interactive map
- Location: North and South Main St. bounded by Eighth, Fifth, River, and Pine Sts., Evart, Michigan
- Coordinates: 43°54′04″N 85°15′34″W
- Built: 1874
- Built by: North Gass
- Architectural style: Italianate, Commercial Brick, Modern
- NRHP reference No.: 100012093
- Added to NRHP: August 11, 2025

The Evart Downtown Historic District is a commercial historic district in Evart, Michigan located primarily along North and South Main Street, between East Fifth and the former railroad tracks. The district was listed on the National Register of Historic Places in 2025.

== History ==
Evart was founded in 1871, coincident with the arrival of the Flint and Pere Marquette Railroad in the area, and a lumber mill and store were constructed along the river in that year. The town quickly grew, with multiple lumber dealers and manufacturers moving in, and by 1873 the town had 800 residents and a small commercial area had developed. Over the next few decades, the town grew in size and the commercial district, primarily located along Main Street, followed suit. By 1878, Evart had four dry good stores, eight grocery stores, two hardware stores, two feed and provision stores, two boot and shoe stores, two drug stores, two jewelry stores, and five hotels, in addition to multiple industrial enterprises (mainly in the logging sector), churches, and community buildings.

As Evart matured and moved into the 20th century, other businesses like banks, candy stores, and coffee shops appeared in the commercial district. The surrounding forests were logged, and the area moved away from timber as the prime industry. After World War II, the rise of supermarkets and malls pulled patrons away from downtown businesses, and Evart's commercial district suffered. However, the area still remains a center of commerce for the area.

== Description ==
The Evart Downtown Historic District is located along three blocks of Main Street, and contains 61 buildings, of which 39 contribute to the historical significance of the district. Most of the structures are brick commercial blocks of Italianate or Commercial Brick style. Italianate buildings in the district have prominent decorative cornices and decorative brickwork around the windows such as hoods, brick arcades, and awnings. The Commercial Brick buildings have larger front windows and false fronts. A few other architectural styles are also represented, including Modern, Richardsonian Romanesque, Colonial Revival, and Folk National Most buildings are two stories, with a few single story structures, and none higher.
