= An Exceptionally Simple Theory of Everything =

Fringe theory of physics

Elementary particle states assigned to E_{8} roots corresponding to their spin, electroweak, and strong charges according to E_{8} Theory, with particles related by triality. This eight-dimensional root diagram is shown projected onto a Coxeter plane.

"An Exceptionally Simple Theory of Everything" is a physics preprint proposing a basis for a unified field theory, often referred to as "E_{8} Theory", which attempts to describe all known fundamental interactions in physics and to stand as a possible theory of everything. The paper was posted to the physics arXiv by Antony Garrett Lisi on November 6, 2007. It was not submitted to a peer-reviewed scientific journal. The title is a pun on the algebra used, the Lie algebra of the largest "simple", "exceptional" Lie group, E_{8}. The paper's goal is to describe how the combined structure and dynamics of all gravitational and Standard Model particle fields are part of the E_{8} Lie algebra.

The theory is presented as an extension of the Grand Unified Theory program, incorporating gravity and fermions. The theory received a flurry of media coverage, but was also met with widespread skepticism. Scientific American reported in March 2008 that the theory was being "largely but not entirely ignored" by the mainstream physics community, with a few physicists picking up the work to develop it further. In July 2009, Jacques Distler and Skip Garibaldi published a critical paper in Communications in Mathematical Physics called "There is no 'Theory of Everything' inside E_{8}", arguing that Lisi's theory, and a large class of related models, cannot work. Distler and Garibaldi offer direct proof that it is impossible to embed all three generations of fermions in E_{8}, or to obtain even one generation of the Standard Model without the presence of additional particles that do not exist in the physical world.

== Overview ==
The goal of E_{8} Theory is to describe all elementary particles and their interactions, including gravitation, as quantum excitations of a single Lie group geometry—specifically, excitations of the noncompact quaternionic real form of the largest simple exceptional Lie group, E_{8}. A Lie group, such as a one-dimensional circle, may be understood as a smooth manifold with a fixed, highly symmetric geometry. Larger Lie groups, as higher-dimensional manifolds, may be imagined as smooth surfaces composed of many circles (and hyperbolas) twisting around one another. At each point in a N-dimensional Lie group there can be N different orthogonal circles, tangent to N different orthogonal directions in the Lie group, spanning the N-dimensional Lie algebra of the Lie group. For a Lie group of rank R, one can choose at most R orthogonal circles that do not twist around each other, and so form a maximal torus within the Lie group, corresponding to a collection of R mutually-commuting Lie algebra generators, spanning a Cartan subalgebra. Each elementary particle state can be thought of as a different orthogonal direction, having an integral number of twists around each of the R directions of a chosen maximal torus. These R twist numbers (each multiplied by a scaling factor) are the R different kinds of elementary charge that each particle has. Mathematically, these charges are eigenvalues of the Cartan subalgebra generators, and are called roots or weights of a representation.

In the Standard Model of particle physics, each different kind of elementary particle has four different charges, corresponding to twists along directions of a four-dimensional maximal torus in the twelve-dimensional Standard Model Lie group, SU(3)×SU(2)×U(1). In grand unified theories (GUTs), the Standard Model Lie group is considered as a subgroup of a higher-dimensional Lie group, such as of 24-dimensional SU(5) in the Georgi–Glashow model or of 45-dimensional Spin(10) in the SO(10) model. Since there is a different elementary particle for each dimension of the Lie group, these theories contain additional particles beyond the content of the Standard Model.

In E_{8} Theory's current state, it is not possible to calculate masses for the existing or predicted particles. Lisi states the theory is young and incomplete, requiring a better understanding of the three fermion generations and their masses, and places a low confidence in its predictions. However, the discovery of new particles that do not fit in Lisi's classification, such as superpartners or new fermions, would fall outside the model and falsify the theory. As of 2021, none of the particles predicted by any version of E_{8} Theory have been detected.

== History ==
Before writing his 2007 paper, Lisi discussed his work at a Foundational Questions Institute (FQXi) forum, at an FQXi conference, and for an FQXi article. Lisi gave his first talk on E_{8} Theory at the Loops '07 conference in Morelia, Mexico, soon followed by a talk at the Perimeter Institute. John Baez commented on Lisi's work in his column This Week's Finds in Mathematical Physics, finding the idea intriguing but ending on the cautionary note that it might not be "mathematically natural to use this method to combine bosons and fermions". Lisi's arXiv preprint, "An Exceptionally Simple Theory of Everything", appeared on November 6, 2007, and immediately attracted attention. Lisi made a further presentation for the International Loop Quantum Gravity Seminar on November 13, 2007, and responded to press inquiries on an FQXi forum. He presented his work at the TED Conference on February 28, 2008.

Numerous news sites reported on the new theory in 2007 and 2008, noting Lisi's personal history and the controversy in the physics community. The first mainstream and scientific press coverage began with articles in The Daily Telegraph and New Scientist, with articles soon following in many other newspapers and magazines.

Lisi's paper spawned a variety of reactions and debates across various physics blogs and online discussion groups. The first to comment was Sabine Hossenfelder, summarizing the paper and noting the lack of a dynamical symmetry-breaking mechanism. Peter Woit commented, "I'm glad to see someone pursuing these ideas, even if they haven't come up with solutions to the underlying problems". The group blog The n-Category Café hosted some of the more technical discussions. Mathematician Bertram Kostant discussed the background of Lisi's work in a colloquium presentation at UC Riverside.

On his blog, Musings, Jacques Distler offered one of the strongest criticisms of Lisi's approach, claiming to demonstrate that, unlike in the Standard Model, Lisi's model is nonchiral — consisting of a generation and an anti-generation — and to prove that any alternative embedding in E_{8} must be similarly nonchiral. These arguments were distilled in a paper written jointly with Skip Garibaldi, "There is no 'Theory of Everything' inside E_{8}", published in Communications in Mathematical Physics. In this paper, Distler and Garibaldi offer a proof that it is impossible to embed all three generations of fermions in E_{8}, or to obtain even the one-generation Standard Model. In response, Lisi argued that Distler and Garibaldi made unnecessary assumptions about how the embedding needs to happen. Addressing the one generation case, in June 2010 Lisi posted a new paper on E_{8} Theory, "An Explicit Embedding of Gravity and the Standard Model in E_{8}", eventually published in a conference proceedings, describing how the algebra of gravity and the Standard Model with one generation of fermions embeds in the E_{8} Lie algebra explicitly using matrix representations. When this embedding is done, Lisi agrees that there is an antigeneration of fermions (also known as "mirror fermions") remaining in E_{8}; but while Distler and Garibaldi state that these mirror fermions make the theory nonchiral, Lisi states that these mirror fermions might have high masses, making the theory chiral, or that they might be related to the other generations. "The explanation for the existence of three generations of fermions, all with the same apparent algebraic structure, remains largely a mystery," Lisi wrote.

Some follow-ups to Lisi's original preprint have been published in peer-reviewed journals. Lee Smolin's "The Plebanski action extended to a unification of gravity and Yang–Mills theory" proposes a symmetry-breaking mechanism to go from an E_{8} symmetric action to Lisi's action for the Standard Model and gravity. Roberto Percacci's "Mixing internal and spacetime transformations: some examples and counterexamples" addresses a general loophole in the Coleman–Mandula theorem also thought to work in E_{8} Theory. Percacci and Fabrizio Nesti's "Chirality in unified theories of gravity" confirms the embedding of the algebra of gravitational and Standard Model forces acting on a generation of fermions in spin(3,11) + 64_{+}, mentioning that Lisi's "ambitious attempt to unify all known fields into a single representation of E_{8} stumbled into chirality issues". In a joint paper with Lee Smolin and Simone Speziale, published in Journal of Physics A, Lisi proposed a new action and symmetry-breaking mechanism.

In 2008, FQXi awarded Lisi a grant for further development of E_{8} Theory.

In September 2010, Scientific American reported on a conference inspired by Lisi's work. Shortly thereafter, they published a feature article on E_{8} Theory, "A Geometric Theory of Everything", written by Lisi and James Owen Weatherall.

In December 2011, in a paper for a special issue of the journal Foundations of Physics, Michael Duff argued against Lisi's theory and the attention it has received in the popular press. Duff states that Lisi's paper was incorrect, citing Distler and Garibaldi's proof, and criticizes the press for giving Lisi uncritical attention simply because of his "outsider" image.
