= Invention USA =

American reality television series

- Also known as: Invention Intervention (outside the US & Canada)
- Genre: Reality
- Starring: Garrett Lisi
- Country of origin: United States
- No. of seasons: 2
- No. of episodes: 14

Production
- Executive producers: Jenny Daly; Matthew Ginsburg; Mike Duffy; Rob Dorfmann
- Production company: T Group Productions

Original release
- Network: History Channel
- Release: December 9, 2011 – December 19, 2012

Invention USA is an American reality television series on the History Channel that debuted on December 9, 2011. The series features inventor and technologist Reichart Von Wolfsheild and Scotty Ziegler (replacing theoretical physicist Garrett Lisi) as they travel around America to oversee the work of amateur inventors. Season 2 premiered on November 26, 2012.

== Episodes ==
Season	Episodes	Originally released	
Season	Episodes	First released	Last released
1	6	December 9, 2011	December 23, 2011
2	8	November 26, 2012	December 19, 2012

=== Season 1 (2011) ===
No.	Title	Original release date
1	"Great Balls of Fire"	December 9, 2011
A combustible weapon for stopping wild animal attacks, a cell phone accessory--the Phone Glove
2	"Think Outside the Box"	December 9, 2011
A cardboard box turned into an upright bass, a safety device for descending from skyscrapers in case of an emergency
3	"Helter-Shelter"	December 16, 2011
An inflatable shelter (Life Cube) to help people in natural disasters, an inventor who has created a fall-proof ladder
4	"Scraping By"	December 16, 2011
A ceiling texture scraper, safety harness
5	"Inventor on Board!"	December 23, 2011
A new skateboard design, a combination compass and belt
6	"Copper and Robbers"	December 23, 2011
A way to stop copper thieves, a device to keep pigeons away

=== Season 2 (2012) ===
No.	Title	Original release date
1	"Get the Fork Outta Here"	November 26, 2012
2	"Scotty's Dust-Up"	November 28, 2012
3	"What the Hail is It?"	November 28, 2012
4	"Shock and Flaw"	December 5, 2012
5	"Football 2.0"	December 5, 2012
6	"Full Throttle"	December 12, 2012
7	"Stop! In the Name of Glove"	December 12, 2012
8	"It Does What?!"	December 19, 2012

== See also ==
- Everyday Edisons, an American reality television series on PBS
