= Joseph William Guyton =

US Army soldier (1889–1918)

- Born: June 10, 1889; Evart, Michigan, U.S.
- Died: May 24, 1918 (aged 28) France
- Allegiance: United States of America
- Branch: United States Army
- Rank: Private

Joseph William Guyton (June 10, 1889 – May 24, 1918) was the first American soldier killed on German-held soil during World War I. Private Guyton was from the small town of Evart, Michigan.

== Life ==
Guyton was born in Evart Township, Michigan. He attended a rural school in the area for only a short time before leaving to work in the oil fields of Ohio. He also worked as a farmer, plumber and well driller.

In December 1909, Joseph Guyton married Winona Baker (died 1918) from Lake City, Michigan. Their only child, Olive Clara Guyton, was born in 1911 and died in 1922. In 1917, after the U.S. entered World War I, Guyton joined the 126th Infantry Regiment and was attached to the 32nd Infantry Division (the "Red Arrow Division") at Camp MacArthur near Waco, Texas. On February 17, 1918, Private Guyton sailed with his comrades out of New York Harbor bound for France. On May 15, 1918, the status of his unit was changed from replacement division to combat.

== Death ==
At around midnight on May 24, Guyton became the first casualty. He was an automatic gunner on a post near the line of resistance. His instructions were to fire his gun intermittently. He was discharging his duties when the Germans returned a barrage of machine gun fire; Guyton was struck in the temple and died instantly. The Commanding General of the 9th French Infantry Division, to which the 126th was attached, issued the following orders on the 25 May:

Divisional Order No. 297 General Gamelin, commanding the 9th Infantry Division, cites in the Divisional Order: "The soldier, Joseph W. Guyton, of the 126th American Infantry Regiment, 'on guard in the first line was killed by a machine gun bullet. He is the first soldier of the 32nd American Division to fall fighting for the cause of right and liberty on Alsacian soil, beside his French comrades."

General Pershing lists Guyton as killed in action on May 24, 1918, in the Gildwilder Sector in Alsace the day after the unit entered the line of battle. He was temporarily buried in a nearby church yard on foreign soil. He was posthumously awarded the croix de guerre (the grand cross of honor) by the government of France.

== In memory ==
Gravesite of Joseph W. Guyton in Evart, MI

In May 1921, President Warren G. Harding placed a presidential wreath on the flag-draped coffin of Private Guyton at a funeral ceremony for over 5,000 American war-dead at the army piers, Hoboken, New Jersey. He spoke these words: "In the name of the republic, I bestow this tribute on the casket of the first soldier who perished on the soil of the enemy... I chose it because I am offering the tribute to the one returned whose death on enemy soil marked the day when our civilization went face forward and the assault on our present day civilization knew it had failed. May 24, 1918, is the date on which this soldier was killed, and the name is that of Joseph W. Guyton, Company I of the 126th Infantry, a resident patriot and hero of the State of Michigan of the United States of America."

Guyton's remains were returned from New Jersey to Evart by rail and were met at the depot by his parents, relatives, friends, citizens of the town, and members of the Joseph W. Guyton Post of the American Legion named in his honor.

June 5, 1921, 10,000 people gathered in Evart to pay tribute to the hero. On hand were dignitaries of the military, state government, local government, and a number of Civil War veterans. The local Evart newspaper reported that over 1,000 automobiles and 500 soldiers were present in the small community that day. Guyton's remains were buried at Forest Hill cemetery outside the town. The following week, Olive Guyton (aged 10) presented the American flag that had draped Guyton's casket, to the local American Legion Post. Olive made the presentation with the assistance of her uncle, L.V. Guyton of Lancaster, Ohio, as her mother had died from influenza just months after her husband was killed. Olive died just one year later from pneumonia.

== Legacy ==
Joseph W. Guyton Informational Designation
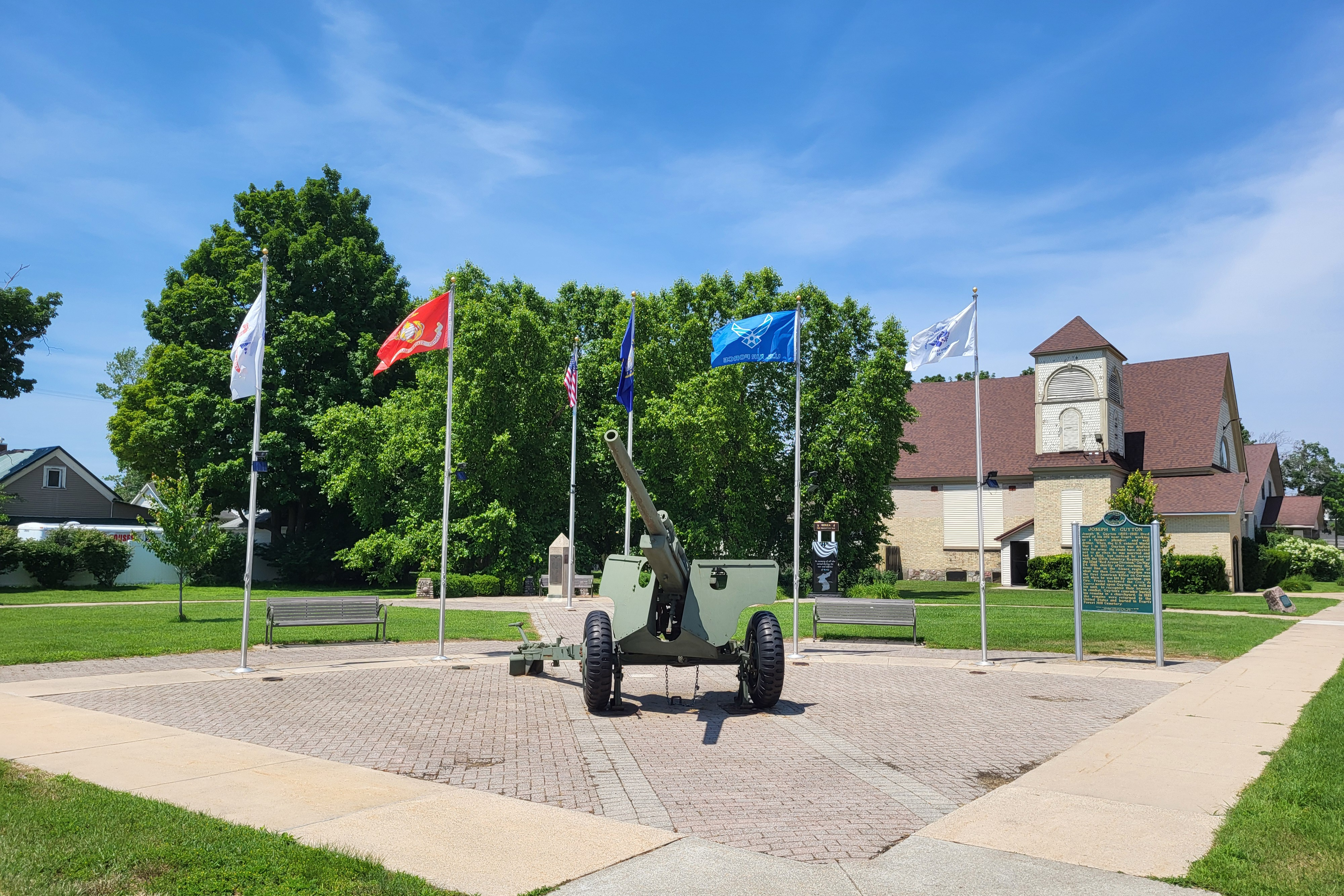

- Location within the state of Michigan
- 43°54′12″N 85°15′34″W
- Location: 315 North Main Street; Evart, MI 49631

Michigan State Historic Site
- Designated: June 15, 2005

Within the city of Evart today are a park and highway bridge both dedicated to the memory of Joseph W. Guyton. In Guyton Park stands a cannon dating back to World War I and a monument to the memory of all who lost their lives from Evart during World War I, the Korean War, and the Vietnam War. Memorial Day ceremonies begin at the Guyton Park and conclude at Forest Hill Cemetery.

An elementary school on the East Side of Detroit, Michigan was built and named in honor of Joseph Guyton. It opened in 1921 and was closed in 2009.

In 2005, Joseph Guyton's legacy was dedicated as a Michigan State Historic Site in Guyton Park at the intersection of East 5th Street and North Main Street. A dual-sided state historic marker was erected on site. The marker reads:

Front: Joseph W. Guyton (1889-1918) lived most of his life near Evart, working as a farmer, plumber, and well driller. When the U.S. entered World War I in 1917, Guyton was drafted into the army. He could have elected not to go since he was married and had a child, but instead he served with the 126th Infantry Regiment of the 32nd "Red Arrow Division." On May 24, 1918, shortly after reaching the front line in the Alsace region of what was then Germany, Guyton was the first American killed on German soil when he was hit by machine gun fire. France bestowed the Croix de Guerre medal upon Guyton, as well as his unit, to recognize their bravery in combat. Guyton's comrades buried his remains in a churchyard. In 1921 the remains were returned to the United States and buried in Evart’s Forest Hill Cemetery.

Back: In 1918 when Private Joseph Guyton died during World War I, his fellow soldiers buried him in a German cemetery. In 1921 his remains, and those of 5,212 other U.S. soldiers, were returned home. At a memorial ceremony in Hoboken, New Jersey, President Warren Harding laid a wreath on Guyton's casket, which represented all the war dead. Guyton's remains were given to his parents and daughter, his wife having died in the worldwide flu epidemic only months after him. Newspapers reported that 10,000 people attended Guyton’s funeral in his hometown of Evart. Tributes include: Evart's Guyton Park, the Joseph W. Guyton American Legion post in Evart, the US-10 "Guyton" Bridge over the Muskegon River in Osceola County, and Guyton Elementary School in Detroit.

== External links/sources ==
- Early Evart, Evart Michigan DDA & LDFA
- Gansser, Emil B., History of the 126th Infantry in the War with Germany, Published 1920 126th Infantry Association, pp. 68–69 Google Books; Kosta Press (March 11, 2010), ISBN 144469751X; ISBN 978-1444697513
- Joseph W. Guyton, Michigan Historical Marker
