= Jerry & Marge Go Large =

2022 American film by David Frankel

- Official release poster
- Directed by: David Frankel
- Screenplay by: Brad Copeland
- Based on: "Jerry and Marge Go Large" by Jason Fagone
- Produced by: Amy Baer; Gil Netter
- Starring: Bryan Cranston; Annette Bening; Larry Wilmore; Rainn Wilson
- Cinematography: Maryse Alberti
- Edited by: Andrew Marcus
- Music by: Jake Monaco
- Production companies: Paramount Players; MRC; Levantine Films
- Distributed by: Paramount+
- Release dates: June 15, 2022 (Tribeca); June 17, 2022 (United States)
- Running time: 96 minutes
- Country: United States
- Language: English

Jerry & Marge Go Large is a 2022 American comedy-drama film directed by David Frankel and written by Brad Copeland. Based on Jason Fagone's 2018 HuffPost article of the same name, the film, which is based on the true story of Jerry and Marge Selbee, stars Bryan Cranston and Annette Bening. The film premiered at the Tribeca Film Festival on June 15, 2022, and was released on Paramount+ on June 17, 2022.

== Plot ==
Jerry Selbee, who lives in the declining town of Evart, Michigan, with his wife, Marge, is forced to retire from his job in a factory after working there for 42 years. Adept at mathematics, he is looking for something to do with the remainder of his life when he discovers a statistical loophole in a lottery known as WinFall: if the jackpot hits $2 million and no one wins it, it is "rolled down", or distributed, to the next tier of winners, in which case a player who purchases a sufficient number of tickets is basically guaranteed a net profit.

To test his theory, and not wanting Marge to know what he is doing, Jerry takes $2000 to a convenience store in nearby Lake City and spends it all on WinFall tickets; rather than winning as he expected, however, he loses money. He realizes he needs to buy a larger number of tickets to take luck out of the equation, so he empties his bank account and returns to Lake City with $8000; this time, he wins over $15,000.

Jerry is finally unable to conceal what he has been doing from Marge; she becomes excited about the scheme and wants them to play the lottery together. When they go to a local store to buy tickets, however, they discover that Michigan’s WinFall lottery has been phased out. Learning that there is a WinFall lottery in Massachusetts, they go there, to a store in Sunderland, again making a substantial profit.

On returning home, Jerry and Marge decide to create a corporation, GS Investment Strategies, and sell shares to other Evart residents to increase the amount they can wager. They return to Sunderland, this time with $40,000 to spend, and double their stake. They keep returning to Massachusetts, eventually having to obtain access to a second machine, and although they continue to reinvest most of their earnings in the venture, the corporation issues dividends that are used to reinvigorate the town, as old businesses reopen and preparations are made to resurrect the local Jazz Fest music festival.

A Harvard University student, Tyler, also discovers the WinFall loophole. When he and his partner, Eric, make less money than they anticipated, they realize someone else is playing and find out by hacking the state′s lottery commission that the machines being used are in Sunderland. Tyler confronts Jerry and Marge, arrogantly suggesting they buy into the students′ operation, but the Selbees refuse.

Eventually, Tyler demands that Jerry stop playing WinFall, threatening to hack into his personal accounts. Jerry decides to give in, but the support of his son and the community makes him change his mind: he and Marge return to Sunderland. Frustrated when he realizes that Jerry has called his bluff, Tyler finds a way to manipulate the lottery to trigger a roll-down ahead of time, which prevents the Selbees from participating. Jerry understands what Tyler has done and confronts him in front of other students who have been working for him, pointing out his selfish tactic is hurting others; the other students withdraw their help, leaving Tyler to continue on his own. To level the playing field, Jerry asks the lottery commission to publicly announce impending roll-downs, which it agrees to do.

Boston Globe reporter Maya Jordan reports on this story; her article causes the lottery commission to confiscate the Sunderland machines and pull the plug definitively after that week's drawing. Jerry and Marge do not return to participate in the final roll-down, but unbeknownst to them, their investors take a bus to Massachusetts and buy tickets all over the state, getting in one last big win. At the new Jazz Fest, Jerry and Marge are greeted as heroes for having brought the town back to life. They and their investors have made a total of $27 million dollars.

== Cast ==
- Bryan Cranston as Jerry Selbee
- Annette Bening as Marge Selbee
- Rainn Wilson as Bill
- Larry Wilmore as Steve
- Michael McKean as Howard
- Ann Harada as Shirley
- Jake McDorman as Doug Selbee
- Anna Camp as Dawn Selbee
- Devyn McDowell as Liz
- Uly Schlesinger as Tyler Langford
- Cheech Manohar as Eric
- Tracie Thoms as Maya
- Lindsay Rootare as Mindy
- Tori Kelly as Herself

== Production ==
In April 2018, it was reported that Levantine Films and Netter Films would produce a film adaptation of Jason Fagone's HuffPost article "Jerry and Marge Go Large", with Brad Copeland writing the screenplay. In June 2021, it was announced that Paramount+ had greenlit the film, set to be directed by David Frankel and star Bryan Cranston and Annette Bening.

Filming began in July 2021 in Georgia, with Rainn Wilson, Larry Wilmore and Jake McDorman joining the cast. In August 2021, Uly Schlesinger, Michael McKean, Anna Camp, Ann Harada, and Devyn McDowell joined the cast.

== Release ==
The film had its world premiere at the Tribeca Film Festival on June 15, 2022. It was released on Paramount+ on June 17, 2022.

== Reception ==
On the review aggregator website Rotten Tomatoes, 67% of 57 critics' reviews are positive, with an average rating of 6.1/10. The website's consensus reads: "Instead of investing in its tremendously talented stars and outlandish fact-based story, Jerry & Marge Go Large gambles on a pile of clichés." Metacritic, which uses a weighted average, assigned the film a score of 52 out of 100, based on 11 critics, indicating "mixed or average" reviews.
