= 8E =

8E or VIII-E may refer to:

- 8E, the character mapping for the letter "É" in Mac OS Roman
- Bering Air (IATA code: 8E), an American airline headquartered in Nome, Alaska
- GCR Classes 8D and 8E, two pairs of three-cylinder compound steam locomotives
- Oflag VIII-E Johannisbrunn, a World War II German prisoner-of-war camp
- Stalag VIII-E, a German World War II prisoner-of-war camp
- Washington State Route 142 (previously Secondary State Highway 8E), a state highway in southern Washington
- Washington State Route 221 (previously Primary State Highway 8E), a 25.95-mile-long state highway

== See also ==
- E8 (disambiguation)
