= Osceola Township, Osceola County, Michigan =

Osceola Township, Michigan
- Civil township
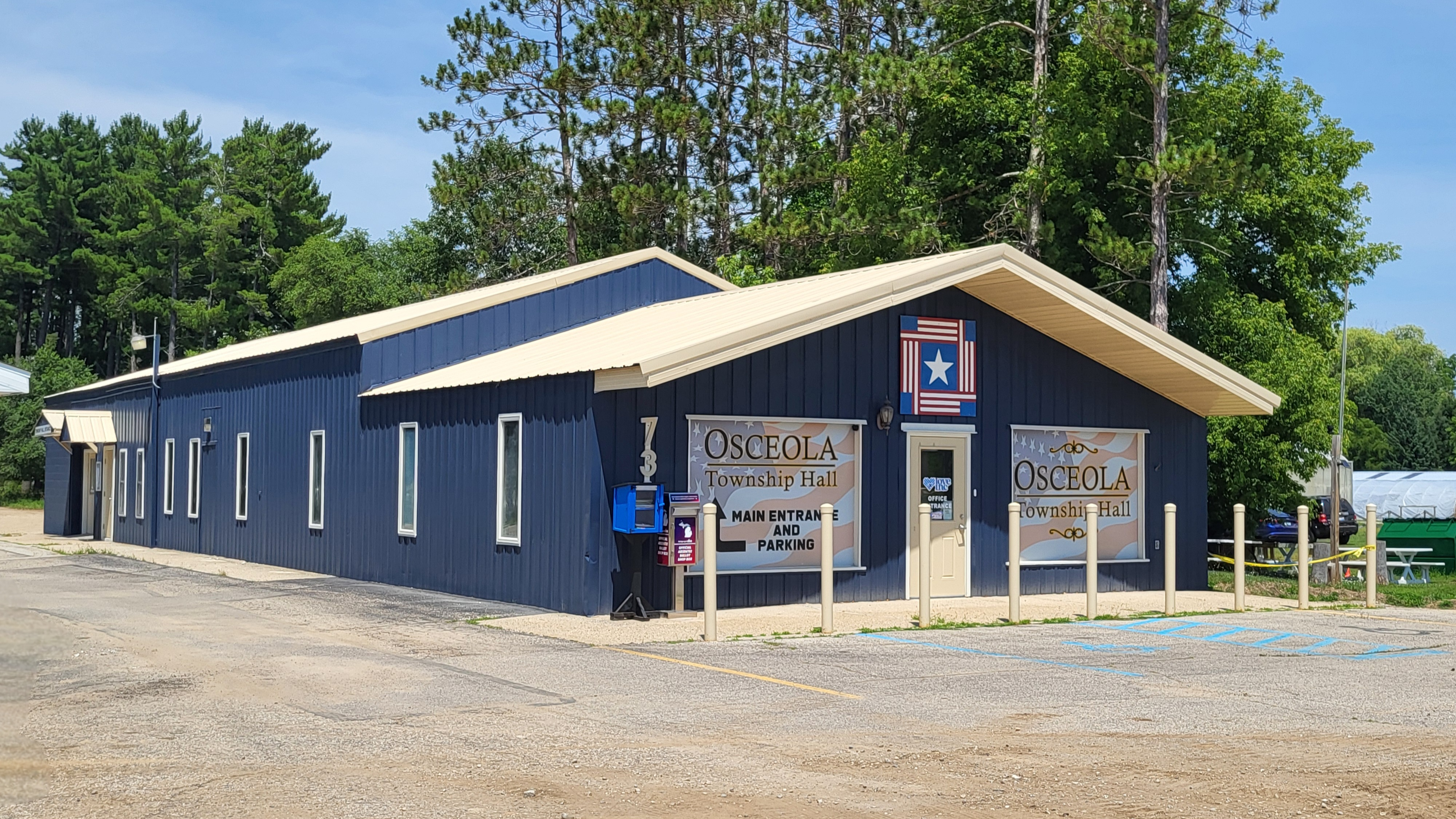
- Osceola Township Hall in Evart

- Location within Osceola County

- Location within the state of Michigan Location within the United States
- Coordinates: 43°55′29″N 85°15′07″W
- Country: United States
- State: Michigan
- County: Osceola
- Established: 1871

Government
  - Supervisor: Tim Ladd
  - Clerk: Jenny Rounds

Area
  - Total: 34.44 sq mi (89.20 km^{2})
  - Land: 34.23 sq mi (88.66 km^{2})
  - Water: 0.21 sq mi (0.54 km^{2})
- Elevation: 1,142 ft (348 m)

Population (2020)
  - Total: 943
  - Density: 27.5/sq mi (10.6/km^{2})
- Time zone: UTC-5 (Eastern (EST))
  - Summer (DST): UTC-4 (EDT)
- ZIP code(s): 49631 (Evart)
- Area code: 231
- FIPS code: 26-61280
- GNIS feature ID: 1626863
- Website: Official website

Osceola Township is a civil township of Osceola County in the U.S. state of Michigan. The population was 943 at the 2020 census.

== Geography ==
According to the United States Census Bureau, the township has a total area of 34.5 square miles (89.3 km^{2}), of which 34.2 square miles (88.6 km^{2}) is land and 0.3 square mile (0.7 km^{2}) (0.75%) is water.

== Demographics ==
As of the census of 2000, there were 1,118 people, 401 households, and 299 families residing in the township. The population density was 32.7 inhabitants per square mile (12.6/km^{2}). There were 543 housing units at an average density of 15.9 per square mile (6.1/km^{2}). The racial makeup of the township was 95.62% White, 0.98% African American, 1.07% Native American, 0.98% Asian, 0.09% from other races, and 1.25% from two or more races. Hispanic or Latino of any race were 0.81% of the population.

There were 401 households, out of which 30.7% had children under the age of 18 living with them, 63.6% were married couples living together, 5.7% had a female householder with no husband present, and 25.2% were non-families. 20.2% of all households were made up of individuals, and 8.2% had someone living alone who was 65 years of age or older. The average household size was 2.60 and the average family size was 2.96.

In the township the population was spread out, with 27.4% under the age of 18, 8.0% from 18 to 24, 25.3% from 25 to 44, 25.2% from 45 to 64, and 14.1% who were 65 years of age or older. The median age was 39 years. For every 100 females, there were 111.7 males. For every 100 females age 18 and over, there were 101.0 males.

The median income for a household in the township was $36,346, and the median income for a family was $37,375. Males had a median income of $30,781 versus $23,047 for females. The per capita income for the township was $16,236. About 4.5% of families and 5.0% of the population were below the poverty line, including 5.0% of those under age 18 and 6.9% of those age 65 or over.
