= Evart, Michigan =

- City
- City of Evart
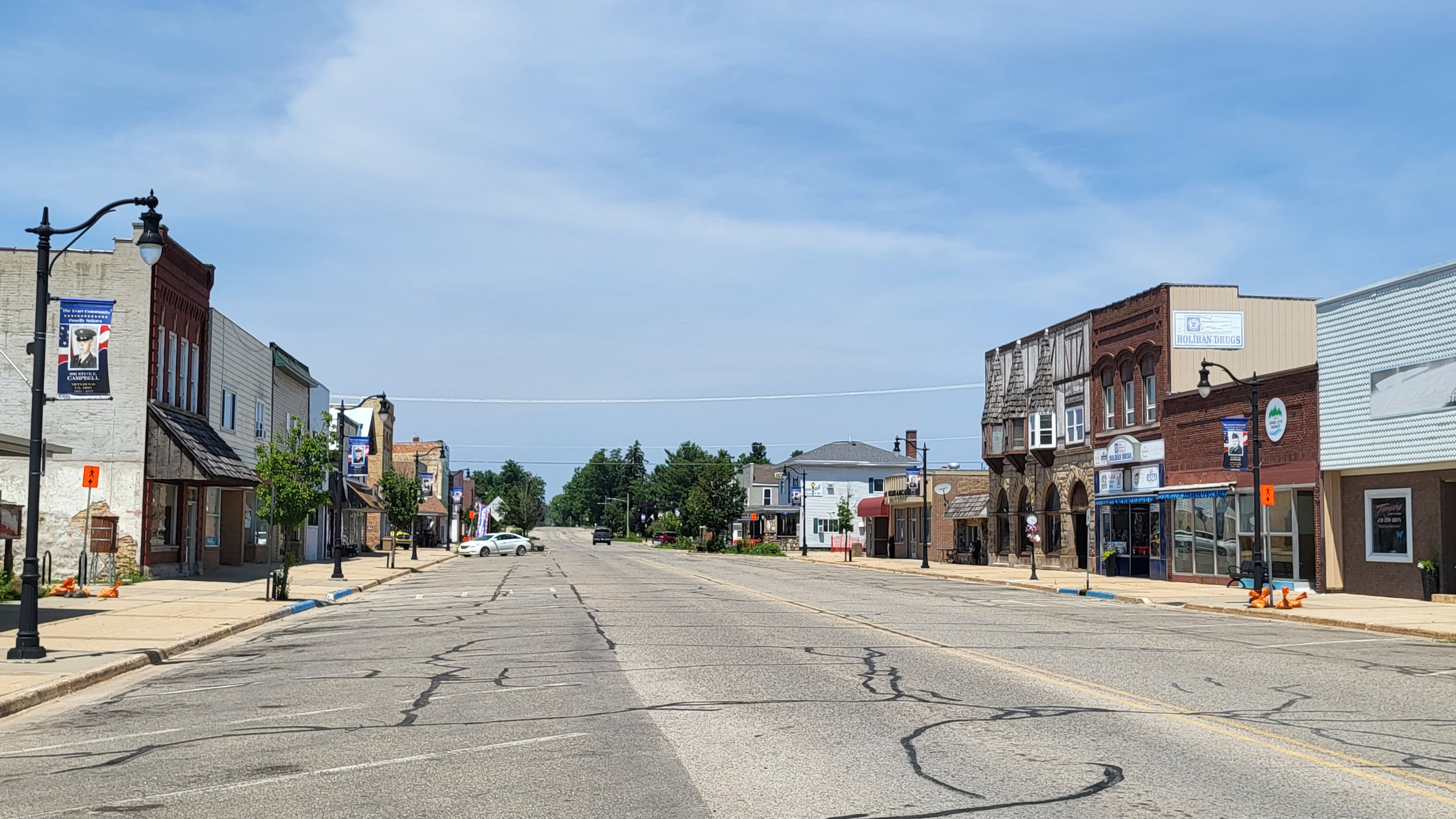
- Looking north along Main Street

- Location within Osceola County

- Location within the state of Michigan Location within the United States
- Coordinates: 43°54′09″N 85°15′50″W
- Country: United States
- State: Michigan
- County: Osceola
- Founded: 1870
- Incorporated: 1872 (village); 1938 (city)

Government
  - Type: Council–manager
  - Mayor: Roger Elkins
  - Manager: Pepper Lockhart
  - Clerk: Andrea Grupido

Area
  - Total: 2.53 sq mi (6.55 km^{2})
  - Land: 2.46 sq mi (6.38 km^{2})
  - Water: 0.066 sq mi (0.17 km^{2})
- Elevation: 1,007 ft (307 m)

Population (2020)
  - Total: 1,742
  - Density: 708.13/sq mi (273.41/km^{2})
- Time zone: UTC-5 (Eastern (EST))
  - Summer (DST): UTC-4 (EDT)
- ZIP code(s): 49631
- Area code: 231
- FIPS code: 26-26640
- GNIS feature ID: 625681
- Website: Official website

Evart (/ˈɛvərt/ EHH-vərt) is a city in Osceola County in the U.S. state of Michigan. The population was 1,742 at the 2020 census. The city occupies a northern portion of Evart Township and a southern portion of Osceola Township, although the city is administered autonomously.

== History ==
The area was first settled by Civil War veteran Perry "Frank" Everts when he bought 80 acres (32 ha) of land. When the community began to grow in 1870, it was named after him but misspelled. The misspelling of "Evart" was made official when a post office was first established here on August 16, 1870. Orlando Windsor served as the first postmaster. Evart was platted in 1872 by James Kennedy and Delos Blodgett, and the community incorporated as a village the same year. It later incorporated as a city in 1938.

The Evart Downtown Historic District was included on the National Register of Historic Places on August 11, 2025 and is the county's only listing on the national registry.

== Geography ==
According to the United States Census Bureau, the city has a total area of 2.53 square miles (6.55 km^{2}), of which 2.46 square miles (6.37 km^{2}) is land and 0.07 square miles (0.18 km^{2}) is water.

It is located along U.S. Route 10 and the Muskegon River.

=== Climate ===
This climatic region has large seasonal temperature differences, with warm to hot (and often humid) summers and cold (sometimes severely cold) winters. According to the Köppen Climate Classification system, Evart has a humid continental climate, abbreviated "Dfb" on climate maps.

Climate data for Evart, Michigan
Month	Jan	Feb	Mar	Apr	May	Jun	Jul	Aug	Sep	Oct	Nov	Dec	Year
Mean daily maximum °C (°F)	−3 (27)	−1 (31)	5 (41)	12 (54)	20 (68)	24 (76)	27 (81)	26 (78)	21 (70)	14 (58)	6 (43)	0 (32)	13 (55)
Mean daily minimum °C (°F)	−13 (8)	−13 (9)	−8 (18)	−1 (31)	5 (41)	10 (50)	12 (54)	12 (53)	7 (45)	1 (33)	−4 (25)	−9 (16)	0 (32)
Average precipitation cm (inches)	5.1 (2)	3.8 (1.5)	5.6 (2.2)	7.4 (2.9)	7.4 (2.9)	8.1 (3.2)	6.4 (2.5)	10 (4)	11 (4.3)	7.1 (2.8)	5.8 (2.3)	5.3 (2.1)	83 (32.7)
Source: Weatherbase

== Demographics ==
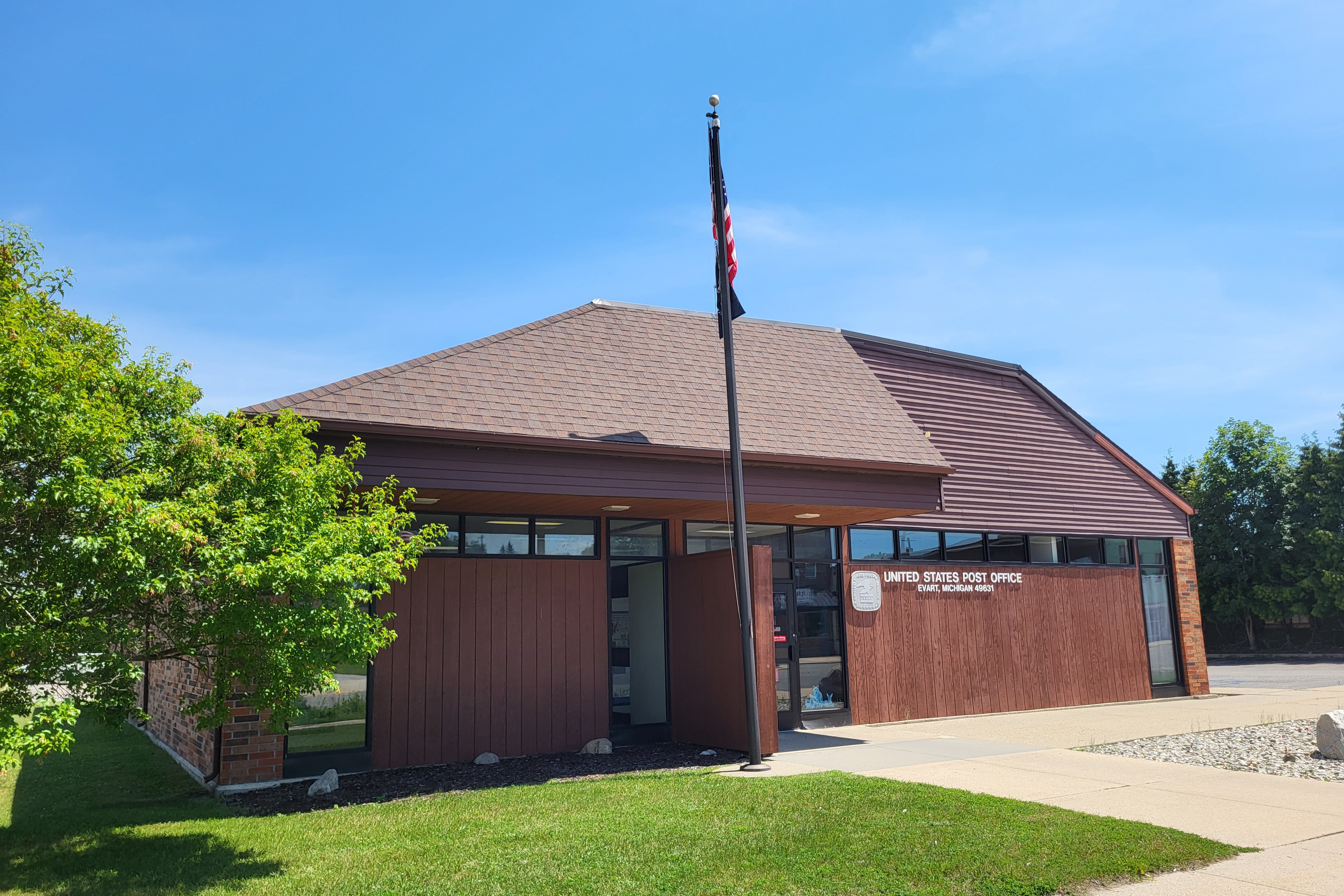
U.S. Post Office in Evart

Historical population
Census	Pop.	Note	%±
1880	1,302		—
1890	1,269		−2.5%
1900	1,360		7.2%
1910	1,386		1.9%
1920	1,326		−4.3%
1930	1,301		−1.9%
1940	1,335		2.6%
1950	1,578		18.2%
1960	1,775		12.5%
1970	1,707		−3.8%
1980	1,945		13.9%
1990	1,744		−10.3%
2000	1,738		−0.3%
2010	1,903		9.5%
2020	1,742		−8.5%
U.S. Decennial Census

=== 2020 census ===
As of the 2020 census, Evart had a population of 1,742. The median age was 36.3 years. 26.2% of residents were under the age of 18 and 16.0% of residents were 65 years of age or older. For every 100 females there were 91.0 males, and for every 100 females age 18 and over there were 84.6 males age 18 and over.

0.0% of residents lived in urban areas, while 100.0% lived in rural areas.

There were 694 households in Evart, of which 33.0% had children under the age of 18 living in them. Of all households, 34.3% were married-couple households, 19.9% were households with a male householder and no spouse or partner present, and 35.2% were households with a female householder and no spouse or partner present. About 33.3% of all households were made up of individuals and 14.0% had someone living alone who was 65 years of age or older.

There were 791 housing units, of which 12.3% were vacant. The homeowner vacancy rate was 3.4% and the rental vacancy rate was 9.1%.

Racial composition as of the 2020 census
Race	Number	Percent
White	1,607	92.3%
Black or African American	16	0.9%
American Indian and Alaska Native	7	0.4%
Asian	0	0.0%
Native Hawaiian and Other Pacific Islander	0	0.0%
Some other race	9	0.5%
Two or more races	103	5.9%
Hispanic or Latino (of any race)	58	3.3%

=== 2010 census ===
As of the census of 2010, there were 1,903 people, 767 households, and 466 families residing in the city. The population density was 849.6 inhabitants per square mile (328.0/km^{2}). There were 889 housing units at an average density of 396.9 per square mile (153.2/km^{2}). The racial makeup of the city was 95.7% White, 0.8% African American, 0.8% Native American, 0.1% Asian, 0.1% Pacific Islander, 0.1% from other races, and 2.5% from two or more races. Hispanic or Latino of any race were 2.2% of the population.

There were 767 households, of which 35.9% had children under the age of 18 living with them, 36.8% were married couples living together, 18.4% had a female householder with no husband present, 5.6% had a male householder with no wife present, and 39.2% were non-families. 34.4% of all households were made up of individuals, and 16% had someone living alone who was 65 years of age or older. The average household size was 2.45 and the average family size was 3.11.

The median age in the city was 33.5 years. 28.5% of residents were under the age of 18; 11% were between the ages of 18 and 24; 22.6% were from 25 to 44; 22.1% were from 45 to 64; and 15.9% were 65 years of age or older. The gender makeup of the city was 45.3% male and 54.7% female.

=== 2000 census ===
As of the census of 2000, there were 1,738 people, 699 households, and 452 families residing in the city. The population density was 866.8 inhabitants per square mile (334.7/km^{2}). There were 794 housing units at an average density of 396.0 per square mile (152.9/km^{2}). The racial makeup of the city was 96.61% White, 0.52% African American, 0.98% Native American, 0.12% Asian, 0.12% Pacific Islander, 0.29% from other races, and 1.38% from two or more races. Hispanic or Latino of any race were 1.27% of the population.

There were 699 households, out of which 34.0% had children under the age of 18 living with them, 42.5% were married couples living together, 17.7% had a female householder with no husband present, and 35.2% were non-families. 31.0% of all households were made up of individuals, and 14.9% had someone living alone who was 65 years of age or older. The average household size was 2.45 and the average family size was 3.05.

In the city, the population was spread out, with 29.2% under the age of 18, 10.5% from 18 to 24, 24.0% from 25 to 44, 21.4% from 45 to 64, and 14.9% who were 65 years of age or older. The median age was 34 years. For every 100 females, there were 81.8 males. For every 100 females age 18 and over, there were 81.1 males.

The median income for a household in the city was $23,348, and the median income for a family was $28,100. Males had a median income of $26,105 versus $20,063 for females. The per capita income for the city was $12,691. About 18.8% of families and 24.8% of the population were below the poverty line, including 32.0% of those under age 18 and 15.5% of those age 65 or over.

== Education ==
Evart and the surrounding areas are served by Evart Public Schools, which operates a single elementary, middle, and high school in the city.

== Government ==
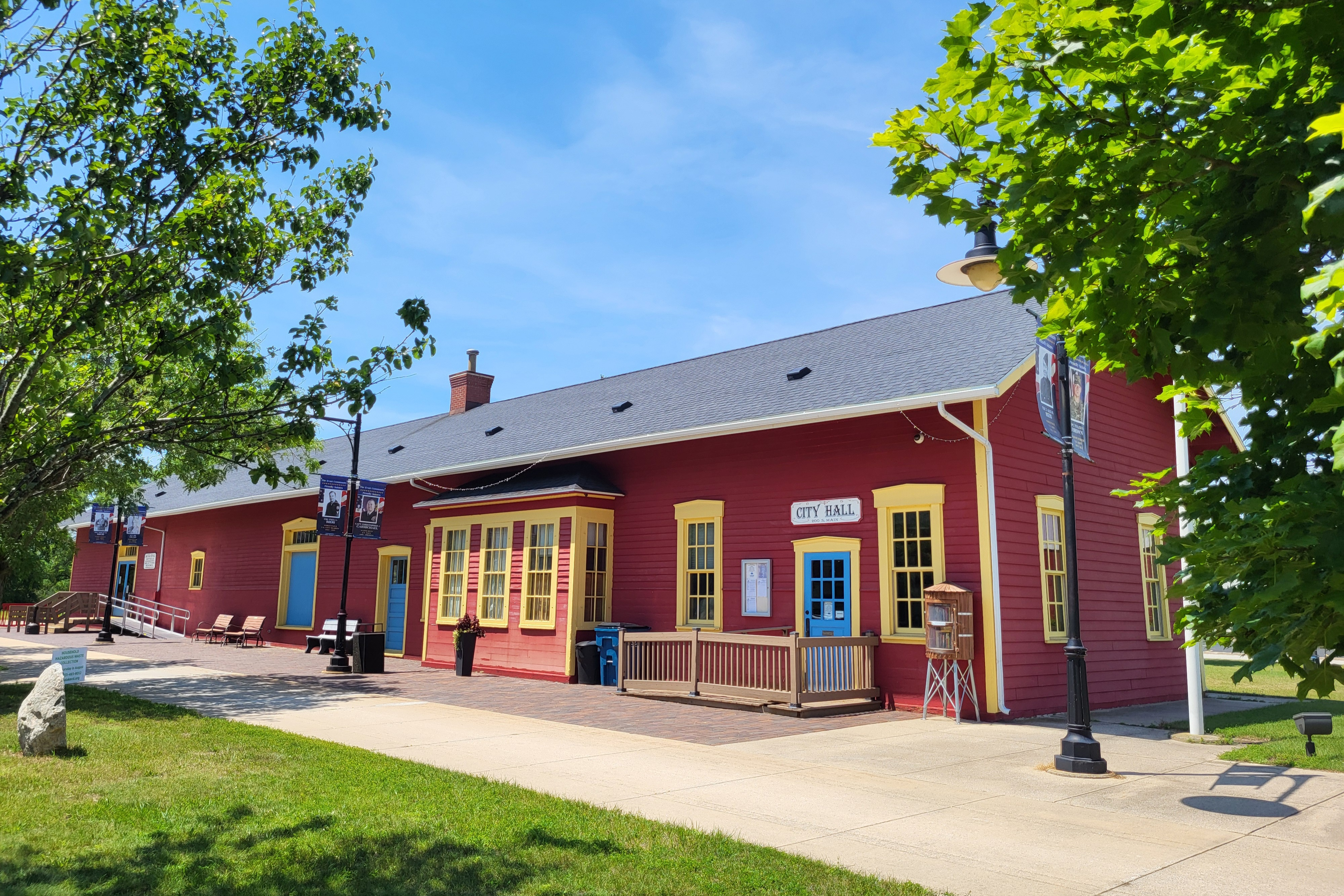
Evart City Hall

The city is operated by a council–manager government. The Evart City Council consists of a mayor, mayor pro-tem, and four council members.

The City of Evart also provides a police department and other municipal services such as the Dept. of Public Works & Streets, Water and Sewer, City Hall, Parks & Recreation Dept., the Local Development Financial Authority, the Downtown Development Authority, and the Evart Municipal Airport.

== Notable people ==
- Wish Egan, Major League Baseball player and scout, was born in Evart.
- Joseph William Guyton, the first American soldier to be killed on German soil during World War I, was born in Evart.
- Jerry and Marge Selbee, the elderly couple who were the basis of the movie Jerry & Marge Go Large live in Evart.
