= Foundational Questions Institute =

Nonprofit organization

The Foundational Questions Institute, styled FQxI (formerly FQXi), is an organization that provides grants to "catalyze, support, and disseminate research on questions at the foundations of physics and cosmology." It was founded in 2005 by cosmologists Max Tegmark and Anthony Aguirre. It is currently run by chief scientific officer David Sloan and chief operating officer Kavita Rajanna.

Best known for its Zenith Grants program, FQxI has awarded 234 grants in ten grant rounds since 2006, totaling $27M. Sample grant round topics include the Nature of Time (2010), Physics of Information (2013), Physics of the Observer (2016), Agency in the Physical World (2018), and Information as Fuel (2019). It also runs frequent essay contests open to the general public with $40,000 in prizes awarded by a jury panel and the best texts published in book format.

FQxI is an independent, philanthropically funded non-profit organization, run by scientists for scientists.

FQxI has been funded by a variety of individual donors and institutes since its inception, most notably the John Templeton Foundation, Fetzer Institute, The Peter and Patricia Gruber Foundation, and Templeton World Charity Foundation.

The $6.2 million seed funding was donated by the John Templeton Foundation, whose goal is to reconcile science and religion. Tegmark has stated that the money came with "no strings attached"; The Boston Globe stated FQxI is run by "two well-respected researchers who say they are not religious. The institute's scientific advisory board is also filled with top scientists." Critics of the John Templeton Foundation such as Sean Carroll have also stated they were satisfied that the FQxI is independent.

== Notable members ==
All FQXi members are listed on its website.

Five FQxI Members are awardees of the Nobel Prize in Physics: Gerard 't Hooft, Anthony Leggett, Frank Wilczek, Roger Penrose, and Anton Zeilinger.

FQxI's Scientific Advisory Council "shares a wide range of expertise on FQxI’s scientific programs and helps with scientific planning." The council members are:

- Jim Al-Khalili
- Adam Brown
- Jeremy Butterfield
- Sean Carroll
- David Chalmers
- Bob Coecke
- Lidia del Rio
- Joshua Deutsch
- George F. R. Ellis
- Surya Ganguli
- Alan Guth
- Jenann Ismael
- Robert Lawrence Kuhn
- Fotini Markopoulou
- Hiranya Peiris
- Chanda Prescod-Weinstein
- Martin Rees
- Carlo Rovelli
- Susan Schneider
- Lee Smolin

== See also ==
- Future of Life Institute
