= Jacques Distler =

Canadian-American physicist (b. 1961)

- Born: January 1, 1961 (age 65); Montreal, Quebec, Canada
- Education: Herzliah High School (Snowdon); Harvard University
- Known for: String theory
- Scientific career
- Fields: Physics
- Workplaces: Princeton University; University of Texas at Austin
- Thesis: Compactified String Theories (1987)
- Doctoral advisor: Sidney Coleman

Jacques Distler (born January 1, 1961) is a Canadian-born American physicist working in string theory. He has been a professor of physics at the University of Texas at Austin since 1994.

== Early life and education ==
Distler was born to a Jewish family in Montreal, Quebec, Canada, where he attended Herzliah High School (Snowdon). He earned his bachelor's and doctoral degrees at Harvard University. His 1987 thesis Compactified String Theories was supervised by Sidney Coleman.

== Physics career ==
Before going to Texas, he was assistant professor at Princeton University.

According to citation counts, his most influential publication is his 1989 paper on conformal field theory in two dimensions. His earliest paper is Gauge Invariant Superstring Field Theory, co-authored with André LeClair and published in 1986 in Nuclear Physics B.

He has studied the "landscape" of metastable vacua in string theory. In July 2005, he released a paper on this topic. Professor Distler was a member of arXiv's physics advisory board.

He maintains a blog titled Musings: Thoughts on Science, Computing, and Life on Earth.

In 2026, Distler was named a fellow of the American Physical Society, "for seminal contributions to string theory and quantum field theory, including the Distler-Kawai formulation of two-dimensional quantum gravity and Liouville theory, foundational work on heterotic string compactifications, and advances in the structure of superconformal field theories".

== Personal life ==
Distler maintains a webpage dedicated to his father, who was born in Poland and escaped the German slave camps of World War II.
