= Lottery mathematics =

Probabilities of winning a lottery game

Lottery mathematics is used to calculate probabilities of winning or losing a lottery game. It is based primarily on combinatorics, particularly the twelvefold way and combinations without replacement. It can also be used to analyze coincidences that happen in lottery drawings, such as repeated numbers appearing across different draws.

In the following

- P is the number of balls in a pool of balls that the winning balls are drawn from, without replacement.
- W is the number of winning balls drawn from the pool.
- T is the number of balls listed on the lottery ticket. (It often equals W.)
- M is the number of balls that match; these balls are both on the lottery ticket and within the winning set.

== Single pool of balls ==
Suppose there are P unique balls (such as P = 49) from which balls are to be drawn without replacement. Suppose a subset of W balls (such as W = 6) is drawn as the winning set. Suppose a subset of T balls (such as T = 6) is selected on a lottery ticket. Suppose M of the T balls from the lottery ticket are also among the W balls in the winning set. Out of the ${P \choose W}$ possible ways (see binomial coefficient) to draw the winning set, there are ${T \choose M}$ ways to have M of them come from the T on the lottery ticket and ${P-T \choose W-M}$ ways to have W − M of them come from the set of P − T not mentioned on the lottery ticket. That is, the probability of getting M matches is given by the following formula when there are P balls in the pool, each lottery ticket selects T balls, and W is the number of winning balls drawn for the lottery.
$$\Pr[M \mid P, T, W] = \frac{{T \choose M}{P-T \choose W-M}}{{P \choose W}}\,.$$

This can also be solved from the opposite point of view. There are ${P \choose T}$ ways to fill out the ticket, ${W \choose M}$ ways to choose the matching numbers from winning set, and ${P-W \choose T-M}$ ways to list the remaining numbers in ticket from among the non-winning numbers.
$$\Pr[M \mid P, T, W] = \frac{{W \choose M}{P-W \choose T-M}}{{P \choose T}}\,.$$
Both expressions give the same result.

=== Single pool examples ===
The chances of getting M matches when drawing W balls from a pool of P balls and lottery tickets with T balls each:

M matches	T=W=6 balls from P=49	T=W=5 balls from P=69
0	$\frac{{6\choose 0}{43\choose 6}}{49\choose 6} = \frac{1 \cdot 6{,}096{,}454}{13{,}983{,}816} \approx 0.436$	$\frac{{5\choose 0}{64\choose 5}}{69\choose 5} = \frac{1 \cdot 7{,}624{,}512}{11{,}238{,}513} \approx 0.678$
1	$\frac{{6\choose 1}{43\choose 5}}{49\choose 6} = \frac{6 \cdot 962{,}598}{13{,}983{,}816} \approx 0.413$	$\frac{{5\choose 1}{64\choose 4}}{69\choose 5} = \frac{5 \cdot 635{,}376}{11{,}238{,}513} \approx 0.283$
2	$\frac{{6\choose 2}{43\choose 4}}{49\choose 6} = \frac{15 \cdot 123{,}410}{13{,}983{,}816} \approx 0.132$	$\frac{{5\choose 2}{64\choose 3}}{69\choose 5} = \frac{10 \cdot 41{,}664}{11{,}238{,}513} \approx 0.0371$
3	$\frac{{6\choose 3}{43\choose 3}}{49\choose 6} = \frac{20 \cdot 12{,}341}{13{,}983{,}816} \approx 0.0177$	$\frac{{5\choose 3}{64\choose 2}}{69\choose 5} = \frac{10 \cdot 2{,}016}{11{,}238{,}513} \approx 0.001\,79$
4	$\frac{{6\choose 4}{43\choose 2}}{49\choose 6} = \frac{15 \cdot 903}{13{,}983{,}816} \approx 0.000\,969$	$\frac{{5\choose 4}{64\choose 1}}{69\choose 5} = \frac{5 \cdot 64}{11{,}238{,}513} \approx 0.000\,0285$
5	$\frac{{6\choose 5}{43\choose 1}}{49\choose 6} = \frac{6 \cdot 43}{13{,}983{,}816} \approx 0.000\,0184$	$\frac{{5\choose 5}{64\choose 0}}{69\choose 5} = \frac{1 \cdot 1}{11{,}238{,}513} \approx 0.000\,000\,0890$
6	$\frac{{6\choose 6}{43\choose 0}}{49\choose 6} = \frac{1 \cdot 1}{13{,}983{,}816} \approx 0.000\,000\,0715$	

== Power balls from a separate pool of balls ==
Some lotteries also have one or more power balls drawn from a separate pool of balls. For example, the first drawing may be for W_{1} = 5 balls out of P_{1} = 69 balls and then W_{2} = 1 power ball may be drawn from P_{2} = 26 balls. For both pools, the drawing is without replacement. Similarly a lottery ticket will indicate T_{1} regular balls and T_{2} power balls. Often the number of balls on the lottery ticket is the same as the winning set: T_{1} = W_{1} and T_{2} = W_{2}. The probabilities of getting M_{1} matches in the first drawing and M_{2} matches in the power ball drawing is just the product of the individual probabilities:
$$\Pr[M_1, M_2 \mid P_1, T_1, W_1, P_2, T_2, W_2] = \frac{{T_1 \choose M_1}{P_1-T_1 \choose W_1-M_1}}{{P_1 \choose W_1}}\frac{{T_2 \choose M_2}{P_2-T_2 \choose W_2-M_2}}{{P_2 \choose W_2}}\,,$$
and similarly for three or more pools of balls.

For example, this formula could be used if one ball is drawn from a pool of balls numbered 0 to 9 and then a second and third ball are also drawn from their own pools of 10 balls: P_{1} = P_{2} = P_{3} = 10, and T_{1} = W_{1} = T_{2} = W_{2} = T_{3} = W_{3} = 1. (Equivalently, all three balls could be drawn from the same pool, so long as each ball is returned to the pool before the next ball is drawn.) However, this case is more easily modeled as if a single ball, numbered from 0 (represented as "000") to 999 is drawn from a single pool of 1000 balls.

=== Separate pool examples ===
The chances of getting M_{1} matches when drawing W_{1} = 5 balls from a pool of P_{1} = 69 balls, getting M_{2} matches when drawing W_{2} = 1 power balls from a separate pool of P_{2} = 26 balls, and having T_{1} = 5 regular balls and T_{2} = 1 power balls selected on the lottery ticket:

M_{1} + M_{2} matches	T_{1}=W_{1}=5 balls from P_{1}=69 and T_{2}=W_{2}=1 balls from P_{2}=26
0 + 0	$\frac{{5\choose 0}{64\choose 5}}{69\choose 5}\frac{{1\choose 0}{25\choose 1}}{26\choose 1} = \frac{1 \cdot 7{,}624{,}512 \cdot 1 \cdot 25}{11{,}238{,}513 \cdot 26} \approx 0.652$
0 + 1	$\frac{{5\choose 0}{64\choose 5}}{69\choose 5}\frac{{1\choose 1}{25\choose 0}}{26\choose 1} = \frac{1 \cdot 7{,}624{,}512 \cdot 1 \cdot 1}{11{,}238{,}513 \cdot 26} \approx 0.0261$
1 + 0	$\frac{{5\choose 1}{64\choose 4}}{69\choose 5}\frac{{1\choose 0}{25\choose 1}}{26\choose 1} = \frac{5 \cdot 635{,}376 \cdot 1 \cdot 25}{11{,}238{,}513 \cdot 26} \approx 0.272$
1 + 1	$\frac{{5\choose 1}{64\choose 4}}{69\choose 5}\frac{{1\choose 1}{25\choose 0}}{26\choose 1} = \frac{5 \cdot 635{,}376 \cdot 1 \cdot 1}{11{,}238{,}513 \cdot 26} \approx 0.001\,09$
2 + 0	$\frac{{5\choose 2}{64\choose 3}}{69\choose 5}\frac{{1\choose 0}{25\choose 1}}{26\choose 1} = \frac{10 \cdot 41{,}664 \cdot 1 \cdot 25}{11{,}238{,}513 \cdot 26} \approx 0.0356$
2 + 1	$\frac{{5\choose 2}{64\choose 3}}{69\choose 5}\frac{{1\choose 1}{25\choose 0}}{26\choose 1} = \frac{10 \cdot 41{,}664 \cdot 1 \cdot 1}{11{,}238{,}513 \cdot 26} \approx 0.001\,43$
3 + 0	$\frac{{5\choose 3}{64\choose 2}}{69\choose 5}\frac{{1\choose 0}{25\choose 1}}{26\choose 1} = \frac{10 \cdot 2{,}016 \cdot 1 \cdot 25}{11{,}238{,}513 \cdot 26} \approx 0.001\,72$
3 + 1	$\frac{{5\choose 3}{64\choose 2}}{69\choose 5}\frac{{1\choose 1}{25\choose 0}}{26\choose 1} = \frac{10 \cdot 2{,}016 \cdot 1 \cdot 1}{11{,}238{,}513 \cdot 26} \approx 0.000\,0690$
4 + 0	$\frac{{5\choose 4}{64\choose 1}}{69\choose 5}\frac{{1\choose 0}{25\choose 1}}{26\choose 1} = \frac{5 \cdot 64 \cdot 1 \cdot 25}{11{,}238{,}513 \cdot 26} \approx 0.000\,0274$
4 + 1	$\frac{{5\choose 4}{64\choose 1}}{69\choose 5}\frac{{1\choose 1}{25\choose 0}}{26\choose 1} = \frac{5 \cdot 64 \cdot 1 \cdot 1}{11{,}238{,}513 \cdot 26} \approx 0.000\,001\,10$
5 + 0	$\frac{{5\choose 5}{64\choose 0}}{69\choose 5}\frac{{1\choose 0}{25\choose 1}}{26\choose 1} = \frac{1 \cdot 1 \cdot 1 \cdot 25}{11{,}238{,}513 \cdot 26} \approx 0.000\,000\,0856$
5 + 1	$\frac{{5\choose 5}{64\choose 0}}{69\choose 5}\frac{{1\choose 1}{25\choose 0}}{26\choose 1} = \frac{1 \cdot 1 \cdot 1 \cdot 1}{11{,}238{,}513 \cdot 26} \approx 0.000\,000\,003\,42$

== Bonus balls from the same pool of balls ==
Some lotteries have one or more bonus balls drawn from the original pool of balls after the first round of balls is drawn. In this scenario each lottery ticket indicates T balls out of P possibilities, but the drawing is for W_{1} balls plus W_{2} bonus balls, without replacement. The probability that M_{1} balls from the first drawing match the lottery ticket and M_{2} balls from the bonus-ball drawing match the lottery ticket is given by
$$\Pr[M_1, M_2 \mid P, T, W_1, W_2] = \frac{{W_1 \choose M_1}{W_2 \choose M_2}{{P-W_1-W_2} \choose {T-M_1-M_2}}}{{P \choose T}}\,.$$

=== Example of balls and bonus balls from the same pool ===
When T = 6 of P = 49 numbers are on a lottery ticket but the winning set is W_{1} = 6 numbers plus W_{2} = 1 bonus ball then probabilities are as follows.

M_{1} + M_{2} matches	T=6 balls on ticket, W_{1}=6 balls and W_{2}=1 bonus ball drawn from P_{1}=49 balls
0 + 0	$\frac{{6 \choose 0}{1 \choose 0}{42 \choose 6}}{{49 \choose 6}} = \frac{1 \cdot 1 \cdot 5{,}245{,}786}{13{,}983{,}816} \approx 0.375$
0 + 1	$\frac{{6 \choose 0}{1 \choose 1}{42 \choose 5}}{{49 \choose 6}} = \frac{1 \cdot 1 \cdot 850{,}668}{13{,}983{,}816} \approx 0.0608$
1 + 0	$\frac{{6 \choose 1}{1 \choose 0}{42 \choose 5}}{{49 \choose 6}} = \frac{6 \cdot 1 \cdot 850{,}668}{13{,}983{,}816} \approx 0.365$
1 + 1	$\frac{{6 \choose 1}{1 \choose 1}{42 \choose 4}}{{49 \choose 6}} = \frac{6 \cdot 1 \cdot 111{,}930}{13{,}983{,}816} \approx 0.0480$
2 + 0	$\frac{{6 \choose 2}{1 \choose 0}{42 \choose 4}}{{49 \choose 6}} = \frac{15 \cdot 1 \cdot 111{,}930}{13{,}983{,}816} \approx 0.120$
2 + 1	$\frac{{6 \choose 2}{1 \choose 1}{42 \choose 3}}{{49 \choose 6}} = \frac{15 \cdot 1 \cdot 11{,}480}{13{,}983{,}816} \approx 0.0123$
3 + 0	$\frac{{6 \choose 3}{1 \choose 0}{42 \choose 3}}{{49 \choose 6}} = \frac{20 \cdot 1 \cdot 11{,}480}{13{,}983{,}816} \approx 0.0164$
3 + 1	$\frac{{6 \choose 3}{1 \choose 1}{42 \choose 2}}{{49 \choose 6}} = \frac{20 \cdot 1 \cdot 861}{13{,}983{,}816} \approx 0.00123$
4 + 0	$\frac{{6 \choose 4}{1 \choose 0}{42 \choose 2}}{{49 \choose 6}} = \frac{15 \cdot 1 \cdot 861}{13{,}983{,}816} \approx 0.000\,924$
4 + 1	$\frac{{6 \choose 4}{1 \choose 1}{42 \choose 1}}{{49 \choose 6}} = \frac{15 \cdot 1 \cdot 42}{13{,}983{,}816} \approx 0.000\,0451$
5 + 0	$\frac{{6 \choose 5}{1 \choose 0}{42 \choose 1}}{{49 \choose 6}} = \frac{6 \cdot 1 \cdot 42}{13{,}983{,}816} \approx 0.000\,0180$
5 + 1	$\frac{{6 \choose 5}{1 \choose 1}{42 \choose 0}}{{49 \choose 6}} = \frac{6 \cdot 1 \cdot 1}{13{,}983{,}816} \approx 0.000\,000\,429$
6 + 0	$\frac{{6 \choose 6}{1 \choose 0}{42 \choose 0}}{{49 \choose 6}} = \frac{1 \cdot 1 \cdot 1}{13{,}983{,}816} \approx 0.000\,000\,0715$
6 + 1	Impossible

== Ensuring to win the jackpot ==
There is only one way to ensure winning the jackpot; it is to buy at least one lottery ticket for every possible number combination. For example, one has to buy 13,983,816 different tickets to ensure winning the jackpot in a 6/49 game. To be profitable, the cost of acquiring these tickets (including any overhead) must not exceed the total amount that those tickets will win, including jackpots and any smaller prizes. If it is likely that the jackpot (or any of the smaller prizes) will have to be split among several winners then only your likely share should be counted in the total amount that those tickets will win.

== Minimum number of tickets for a match ==
It is a hard (and often open) problem to calculate the minimum number of tickets one needs to purchase to guarantee that at least one of these tickets matches at least 2 numbers. In the 5-from-90 lotto, the minimum number of tickets that can guarantee a ticket with at least 2 matches is 100.

== Coincidences involving lottery numbers ==
Coincidences in lottery drawings often capture our imagination and can make news headlines as they seemingly highlight patterns in what should be entirely random outcomes. For example, repeated numbers appearing across different draws may appear on the surface to be too implausible to be by pure chance. For instance, on September 6, 2009, the six numbers 4, 15, 23, 24, 35, and 42 were drawn from 49 in the Bulgarian national 6/49 lottery, and in the very next drawing on September 10th, the same six numbers were drawn again. Lottery mathematics can be used to analyze these extraordinary events.
