= Michigan's 30th Senate district =

American legislative district

Michigan's 30th State Senate district
Senator
Mark Huizenga; R–Walker
- Demographics: 80.3% White; 5% Black; 7.3% Hispanic; 2.5% Asian; 0.2% Native American; 0.5% Other; 4.2% Multiracial
- Population (2024): 271,040

Michigan's 30th Senate district is one of 38 districts in the Michigan Senate. The 30th district was created by the 1850 Michigan Constitution, as the 1835 constitution only permitted a maximum of eight senate districts. It has been represented by Republican Mark Huizenga since 2023, succeeding fellow Republican Roger Victory.

By most measures, the 2012-2022 version of the district was the most Republican-leaning district in the Senate. However, redistricting in 2022 reconfigured the district to take in much of the northern half of the city of Grand Rapids, making it a more competitive seat. Incumbent Republican state senator Mark Huizenga, who had won a special election for the previous 28th district, was narrowly re-elected over Democratic state representative David LaGrand, the closest race of the entire 2022 state Senate elections.

== Geography ==
District 30 encompasses parts of Kent and Ottawa counties.

=== 2011 Apportionment Plan ===
District 30, as dictated by the 2011 Apportionment Plan, was exactly coterminous with Ottawa County in the western suburbs of Grand Rapids, including the communities of Grand Haven, Hudsonville, Coopersville, Zeeland, Ferrysburg, Allendale, Jenison, Georgetown Township, Grand Haven Township, Holland Township, Park Township, Spring Lake Township, Zeeland Township, and most of northern Holland.

The district was located entirely within Michigan's 2nd congressional district, and overlapped with the 88th, 89th, and 90th districts of the Michigan House of Representatives.

== List of senators ==
Senator	Party	Dates	Residence	Notes
John S. Smith	Democratic	1853–1854	Armada	
Cortez P. Hooker	Democratic	1855–1856	Ashley	
Stephen H. Warren	Republican	1857–1858	Eureka	
Osmond Tower	Republican	1859–1862	Ionia	
Nelson Green	Republican	1863–1864	Clay Banks	
Elias W. Merrill	Republican	1865–1866	Muskegon	
Israel E. Carleton	Republican	1867–1870	Whitehall	Lived in Mears until around 1869.
Wales F. Storrs	Republican	1871–1872	Coopersville	
Edgar L. Gray	Republican	1873–1876	Newaygo	
Fitch R. Williams	Republican	1877–1878	Elk Rapids	
George W. Bell	Republican	1879–1880	Cheboygan	
Archibald Buttars	Republican	1881–1882	Charlevoix	
John H. Richardson	Independent	1883–1884	Tuscola	
Lewis C. Davis	Democratic	1885–1886	Vassar	Elected on a Fusionist ticket, also backed by the Greenback Party.
Henry W. Seymour	Republican	1887–1888	Sault St. Marie	Resigned.
Albert O. Blackwell	Republican	1889–1890	Gladstone	
George W. Sharp	Democratic	1891–1892	Newberry	
Joseph Flesheim	Republican	1893–1894	Menominee	
Richard Mason	Republican	1895–1898	Gladstone	
Fred K. Baker	Republican	1899–1900	Menominee	
Oramel B. Fuller	Republican	1901–1904	Ford River	
Willis N. Mills	Republican	1905–1906	Menominee	
Oramel B. Fuller	Republican	1907–1908	Ford River	
Otto Fowle	Republican	1909–1912	Sault St. Marie	
James C. Wood	Republican	1913–1918	Manistique	
William A. Lemire	Republican	1919–1922	Escanaba	
Frank P. Bohn	Republican	1923–1926	Newberry	
Herbert J. Rushton	Republican	1927–1932	Escanaba	
W. F. Doyle	Republican	1933–1934	Menominee	
John F. Luecke	Democratic	1935–1936	Escanaba	
James D. Dotsch	Democratic	1937–1940	Garden	
Joseph A. Laframboise	Democratic	1941–1944	Gladstone	
George Girrbach	Republican	1945–1948	Sault St. Marie	Died in office.
William A. Ellsworth	Republican	1949–1954	St. Ignace	
Edward H. Gibbs	Democratic	1955–1956	Perkins	
William E. Miron	Democratic	1957–1962	Escanaba	Died in office.
Kent T. Lundgren	Republican	1962–1964	Menominee	
Emil Lockwood	Republican	1965–1970	St. Louis	
Bill Ballenger	Republican	1971–1974	Delta Township	Lived in Ovid until around 1972.
Richard J. Allen	Republican	1975–1982	Alma	
Alan Cropsey	Republican	1983–1986	DeWitt	
Frederick P. Dillingham	Republican	1987–1994	Fowlerville	
Glenn Steil Sr.	Republican	1995–2002	Grand Rapids	
Wayne Kuipers	Republican	2003–2010	Holland	
Arlan Meekhof	Republican	2011–2018	West Olive	
Roger Victory	Republican	2019–2022	Georgetown Township	
Mark Huizenga	Republican	2023–present	Walker	

== Recent election results ==
=== 2020s ===
2026 Michigan Senate election
Primary election
Party	Candidate	Votes	%
General election
Democratic	Carol Glanville	76,086	54.85
Republican	Mark E. Huizenga (incumbent)	62,232	45.15
Total votes		138,718	100
Democratic gain from Republican			

2022 Michigan Senate election, District 30
Primary election
Party	Candidate	Votes	%
Republican	Mark E. Huizenga (incumbent)	30,784	77.1
Republican	Keith Hinkle	9,136	22.9
Total votes		39,920	100
General election
Republican	Mark E. Huizenga (incumbent)	63,754	49.2
Democratic	David LaGrand	63,363	48.9
Libertarian	Theodore Petzold	2,516	1.9
Total votes		129,633	100
Republican hold			

=== 2018 ===
2018 Michigan Senate election, District 30
Primary election
Party	Candidate	Votes	%
Republican	Roger Victory	16,895	41.7
Republican	Daniela Garcia	10,647	26.3
Republican	Joseph Haveman	10,585	26.1
Republican	Rett DeBoer	2,399	5.9
Total votes		40,526	100
General election
Republican	Roger Victory	79,323	63.2
Democratic	Jeanette Schipper	42,904	34.2
Libertarian	Mary Buzuma	3,189	2.5
Total votes		125,416	100
Republican hold			

=== 2014 ===
2014 Michigan Senate election, District 30
Party	Candidate	Votes	%
Republican	Arlan Meekhof (incumbent)	62,338	71.4
Democratic	Sarah Howard	24,940	28.6
Total votes		87,278	100
Republican hold			

=== 1998 ===
1998 Michigan Senate 30th district election
Party	Candidate	Votes	%	±%
Republican	Glenn Steil Sr. (incumbent)	47,499	62.48%	
Democratic	Carol Hennessy	28,525	37.52%	
Total votes		76,024	100.00%	

=== Federal and statewide results ===
Year	Office	Results
2020	President	Trump 59.8 – 38.3%
2018	Senate	James 62.7 – 35.6%
2018	Governor	Schuette 60.4 – 36.9%
2016	President	Trump 62.3 – 31.7%
2014	Senate	Land 65.2 – 31.2%
2014	Governor	Snyder 73.6 – 24.5%
2012	President	Romney 66.8 – 32.4%
2012	Senate	Hoekstra 63.9 – 33.4%

== Historical district boundaries ==
Map	Description	Apportionment Plan	Notes
	Clinton County; Eaton County (part); Benton Township; Charlotte; Chester Township; Delta Township; Eaton Township; Eaton Rapids; Eaton Rapids Township; Grand Ledge; Hamlin Township; Lansing (part); Oneida Township; Potterville; Roxand Township; Sunfield Township; Windsor Township; Gratiot County; Ingham County (part); Locke Township; Williamston; Williamstown Township; Montcalm County (part); Belvidere Township; Bloomer Township; Bushnell Township; Carson City; Cato Township; Crystal Township; Day Township; Douglass Township; Eureka Township; Evergreen Township; Fairplain Township; Ferris Township; Greenville; Home Township; Montcalm Township; Pine Township; Richland Township; Sidney Township; Stanton; Winfield Township; Shiawassee County	1964 Apportionment Plan	
	Barry County (part); Castleton Township; Maple Grove Township; Calhoun County (part); Lee Township; Clinton County; Eaton County (part); Excluding; Sunfield Township; Gratiot County (part); Alma; Elba Township; Fulton Township; Newark Township; New Haven Township; North Shade Township; Pine River Township; Seville Township; Sumner Township; Washington Township; Ingham County (part); Alaiedon Township (part); Aurelius Township; Bunker Hill Township; Ingham Township; Leroy Township; Leslie; Leslie Township; Mason; Onondaga Township; Stockbridge Township; Vevay Township; Wheatfield Township; White Oak Township; Jackson County (part); Blackman Township (part); Rives Township; Tompkins Township; Montcalm County (part); Crystal Township; Ferris Township; Shiawassee County (part); Bennington Township; Fairfield Township; Hazelton Township; Laingsburg; Middlebury Township; New Haven Township; Owosso (part); Owosso Township; Perry; Perry Township; Rush Township; Sciota Township; Shiawassee Township; Vernon Township (part); Woodhull Township	1972 Apportionment Plan	
	Clinton County; Livingston County; Shiawassee County	1982 Apportionment Plan	
	Kent County (part); Alpine Township; Grand Rapids; Plainfield Township; Sparta Township; Walker	1992 Apportionment Plan	
	Kent County (part); Grandville; Sparta Township; Ottawa County	2001 Apportionment Plan	
	Ottawa County	2011 Apportionment Plan	
