= Central Montcalm Public Schools =

School district in Michigan, United States

Address
- 1480 South Sheridan Road Stanton, Montcalm County, Michigan, 48888; United States

District information
- Grades: Pre-Kindergarten-12
- Superintendent: Amanda McLaughlin
- Schools: 3
- Budget: $21,748,000 2022-2023 expenditures
- NCES District ID: 2608640

Students and staff
- Students: 1,311 (2024-2025)
- Teachers: 73.99 (on an FTE basis) (2024-2025)
- Staff: 183.44 FTE (2024-2025)
- Student–teacher ratio: 17.72 (2024-2025)

Other information
- Website: central-montcalm.org

Central Montcalm Public Schools is a public school district in West Michigan. In Montcalm County, it serves Sheridan, Stanton, and parts of the townships of Bushnell, Crystal, Day, Douglass, Evergreen, Fairplain, Ferris, Montcalm, Pine, and Sidney. It also serves part of Ronald Township in Ionia County.

== History ==
Prior to consolidation, Stanton and Sheridan were in separate districts with their own high schools. Stanton High School moved to a new building around 1961. The merged Stanton/Sheridan school district adopted the name Central Montcalm Public Schools and Stanton's new high school became Central Montcalm High School. Sheridan High School closed at the end of the 1962–1963 school year. Its students began attending the merged high school in fall 1963. The athletic director at the time, Jake Helms, copied the school colors of Michigan State University and chose the mascot, the Green Hornets.

A middle school addition was added to the high school in 1975, and an athletic complex was built around 1987. In 1999, a $22.6 million bond issue (about $43.7 million in 2025 dollars) passed to build an upper elementary school and additions at other district buildings.

=== Caboose ===
In 1972, high school art teacher Dave Kemler and his class were so impressed with the Michigan Art Train, a project by the Michigan Council of Arts, that they requested that they donate a caboose to beautify the school grounds. They explained in their request that a caboose would be fitting for the school because it had been built over a former railroad bed. The Council of Arts agreed, but they had already abandoned their caboose in Kentucky. As the Future Farmers of America club were doing a landscaping project at the front of the school, members of the Michigan National Guard volunteered to bring the caboose to Michigan and install it in a prominent place amongst the landscaping. The caboose became a popular site for photographs and an icon of the school.

In 2010, a fundraising effort to strip and paint the caboose gained local media attention. In 2020, the caboose was moved to a different location on the high school grounds because the ground had settled under it.

== Schools ==
Schools in Central Montcalm Public Schools district
School	Address	Notes
Central Montcalm Middle/High School	1480 S. Sheridan Road, Stanton	Grades 6–12. Built 1961.
Central Montcalm Upper Elementary	1488 S. Sheridan Road SW, Stanton	Grades 3–5
Central Montcalm Elementary	289 St. Clair Street, Sheridan	Grades PreK-2
CM Learning Center/Great Start Readiness Program	710 N State Street, Stanton	Preschool
