= Montabella Community Schools =

School district in Michigan

Address
- 1390 North County Line Road Blanchard, Isabella County, Michigan, 49310; United States

District information
- Grades: Pre-Kindergarten-12
- Superintendent: Andrew Alvesteffer and Shelly Millis
- Schools: 2
- Budget: $16,341,000 2022-2023 expenditures
- NCES District ID: 2612960

Students and staff
- Students: 777 (2024-2025)
- Teachers: 50.52 (on an FTE basis) (2024-2025)
- Staff: 119.09 FTE (2024-2025)
- Student–teacher ratio: 15.38 (2024-2025)
- District mascot: Mustangs
- Colors: Navy and white

Other information
- Website: www.montabella.com

Montabella Community Schools is a public school district in Central Michigan. The name Montabella is a portmanteau of the counties served by the district: MONTcalm, MecosTA, and IsaBELLA. In Isabella County, the district serves Rolland Township and parts of the townships of Broomfield, Deerfield, and Fremont. In Mecosta County, it serves part of Millbrook Township. In Montcalm County, it serves Edmore, McBride, Home Township, and parts of the townships of Belvidere, Day, Douglass, and Richland.

== History ==
Montabella Community Schools was established in 1966, when Blanchard, Edmore, and Six Lakes school districts merged.

A new high school opened in March 1980 between Blanchard and Edmore. It featured a 63-foot-long history-themed mural by Michigan artist Larry Blovits, paid for by a grant from the Michigan Council for the Arts. That building is currently used as Montabella Elementary.

Voters passed construction bond issues in 1999 and 2018 to add new facilities to the campus.

== Schools ==
Schools in Montcalm Community Schools district share a campus on North County Line Road between Blanchard and Edmore.

Schools in Montabella Community Schools district
School	Address	Notes
Montabella Junior/Senior High School	1324 North County Line Road, Blanchard	Grades 6–12.
Montabella Elementary	1456 North County Line Road, Blanchard	Grades PreK-5.
