= Home Township, Montcalm County, Michigan =

Home Township, Michigan
- Township
- Location within Michigan Location within the United States
- Coordinates: 43°24′44″N 85°1′53″W
- Country: United States
- State: Michigan
- County: Montcalm

Area
  - Total: 36.1 sq mi (93.5 km^{2})
  - Land: 36.0 sq mi (93.2 km^{2})
  - Water: 0.12 sq mi (0.3 km^{2})
- Elevation: 948 ft (289 m)

Population (2020)
  - Total: 2,716
  - Density: 75.4/sq mi (29.1/km^{2})
- Time zone: UTC-5 (Eastern (EST))
  - Summer (DST): UTC-4 (EDT)
- ZIP codes: 48829 (Edmore); 48812 (Cedar Lake); 48891 (Vestaburg); 49310 (Blanchard)
- FIPS code: 26-38840
- GNIS feature ID: 1626483
- Website: Official website

Home Township is a civil township of Montcalm County, Michigan, United States. As of the 2020 census, the township population was 2,716.

== Geography ==
The township is in northeastern Montcalm County and is bordered to the north by Isabella County. The village of Edmore is in the south-central part of the township. State highway M-46 crosses the township, passing through Edmore and leading east to St. Louis and west to Lakeview. M-66 runs along the western border of the township south of M-46, leading south 8 miles (13 km) to Stanton, the Montcalm county seat.

According to the U.S. Census Bureau, Home Township has a total area of 36.1 square miles (93 km^{2}), of which 0.1 square miles (0.3 km^{2}), or 0.33%, are water. The township drains east to Wolf Creek, a tributary of the Pine River and part of the Lake Huron watershed, and west to Stony Creek, a tributary of the Flat River, a tributary of the Grand River flowing to Lake Michigan.

=== Communities ===
- Cedar Lake is an unincorporated community on M-46 approximately 3 miles (5 km) east of Edmore at 43°24′22″N 84°58′30″W. The Cedar Lake post office, with ZIP code 48812, provides P.O. box service for the community. The community developed around a railroad station and was platted in 1876. It was named for its location in an area of cedar trees. Frederick H. Harlin became the first postmaster on July 26, 1876. Cedar Lake is home to the Great Lakes Adventist Academy Academy and the township's Adventist heritage.
- Edmore is a village within the township. The Edmore ZIP code 48829 serves most of Home Township as well as portions of several surrounding townships.
- Wyman is an unincorporated community approximately 3 miles north of Edmore at 43°27′18″N 85°02′35″W. In 1879, Wyman was platted as "Averyville" by O.W. Avery, and a post office was established under that name with Harvey P. Wyman as the first postmaster. The post office was renamed "Wyman" in 1880 and operated until 1944. It was also a significant stop on the railroad during the logging era hosting a station on the Detroit, Lansing and Northern Railroad.

== Demographics ==
Historical population
Census	Pop.	Note	%±
1870	173		—
1880	1,982		1,045.7%
1890	1,498		−24.4%
1900	1,653		10.3%
1910	1,819		10.0%
1920	1,876		3.1%
1930	1,907		1.7%
1940	1,896		−0.6%
1950	1,955		3.1%
1960	2,480		26.9%
1970	2,487		0.3%
1980	2,614		5.1%
1990	2,513		−3.9%
2000	2,708		7.8%
2010	2,542		−6.1%
2020	2,716		6.8%
U.S. Decennial Census

As of the census of 2000, there were 2,708 people, 1,033 households, and 753 families residing in the township. The population density was 75.2 inhabitants per square mile (29.0/km^{2}). There were 1,127 housing units at an average density of 31.3 per square mile (12.1/km^{2}). The racial makeup of the township was 96.42% White, 0.26% African American, 0.52% Native American, 0.07% Asian, 0.85% from other races, and 1.88% from two or more races. Hispanic or Latino of any race were 3.14% of the population.

There were 1,033 households, out of which 36.7% had children under the age of 18 living with them, 57.3% were married couples living together, 10.2% had a female householder with no husband present, and 27.1% were non-families. 23.8% of all households were made up of individuals, and 11.7% had someone living alone who was 65 years of age or older. The average household size was 2.59 and the average family size was 3.05.

In the township the population was spread out, with 28.5% under the age of 18, 7.5% from 18 to 24, 27.6% from 25 to 44, 20.8% from 45 to 64, and 15.6% who were 65 years of age or older. The median age was 36 years. For every 100 females, there were 94.4 males. For every 100 females age 18 and over, there were 91.1 males.

The median income for a household in the township was $30,590, and the median income for a family was $40,061. Males had a median income of $28,462 versus $21,950 for females. The per capita income for the township was $14,522. About 12.4% of families and 16.3% of the population were below the poverty line, including 19.9% of those under age 18 and 13.8% of those age 65 or over.

== Education ==
=== Public Education ===
The Montabella Community Schools district is the primary provider of K–12 instruction for Home Township, with facilities located in nearby Blanchard. Depending on specific residential boundaries, some students may also fall within the Vestaburg Community Schools or Central Montcalm Public Schools districts.

=== Private and Parochial Schools ===
The township is a regional center for Seventh-day Adventist education:

- Cedar Lake SDA Elementary School provides a private K–8 curriculum that integrates standard academic subjects with religious and music education, emphasizing character development and community service.
- Great Lakes Adventist Academy (GLAA) is a co-educational secondary school (grades 9–12) serving both boarding and local "day" students. The academy is characterized by a mandatory vocational work-study program and recognized performing arts groups, including the Aerokhanas gymnastics team and touring ensembles for band, strings, handbells, and choir. Its educational philosophy focuses on Christian discipleship, service, and academic excellence.

=== Higher Education ===
Montcalm Community College (MCC), located in nearby Sidney, serves as the post-secondary and vocational training center for the Home township. Through a partnership with the Montcalm Area Intermediate School District (MAISD), local high school students can access dual-enrollment courses and the Montcalm County Early College program. These initiatives allow participants to earn college credits or an associate degree concurrently with their high school diploma.

== Notable people ==
- Walker Evans, was a legendary off-road truck racer, NASCAR driver, team owner, and member of the Motorsports Hall of Fame of America. Official biographies from the Motorsports Hall of Fame and SCORE International confirm Evans was born in Cedar Lake, Michigan (within Home Township). Known as "The Legend," he earned 142 victories and 21 championships throughout his career.

== Unusual attraction ==
Two-Story Outhouse (Cedar Lake)

Originally constructed circa 1875 by lumber businessman William Nelson, this unique lateral-entry privy was a functional extension of a large, dual-purpose complex that served as both the Nelson family residence and a bustling general store. To maintain privacy and convenience for the family living on the upper floor while the store operated below, a second-story footbridge connected the living quarters directly to the top level of the outhouse. The interior featured a specialized wooden "poop chute" and offset seating, a sophisticated 19th-century engineering solution that allowed both levels to be used simultaneously and sanitarily.

For over a century, the outhouse stood as a silent witness to the region's history, even as the primary residence eventually fell into ruin. In 2014, a structural fire destroyed the remains of the original Nelson home, leaving the outhouse as the sole surviving vestige of the 1875 estate. Its survival was precarious; natural springs near the foundation softened the earth, causing the heavy timber frame to develop a severe lean. Additionally, the lower timbers had begun to decay because the ground floor had been used by local chickens to roost, where the resulting manure softened the wood over time.

In 2017, a meticulous restoration was performed by local and Amish craftsmen to save the landmark. During this process, the structure was carefully moved from its unstable original footing to a more central and stable portion of the property. While the lower half required rebuilding to ensure structural integrity, the entire upper story remains the original 1870s timber. Preserved behind protective exterior wood and visible through new plexiglass viewing windows, the outhouse is now positioned for long-term preservation, with future plans to include dedicated parking and historical signage for visitors traveling the Fred Meijer Heartland Trail.
