= M-66 (Michigan highway) =

State highway in Michigan, United States

M-66
- M-66 highlighted in red

Route information
- Maintained by MDOT
- Length: 266.399 mi (428.728 km)
- Existed: c. July 1, 1919–present

Major junctions
- South end: SR 9 near Sturgis
- US 12 at Sturgis; I-94 / I-194 at Battle Creek; I-96 near Ionia; US 10 near Sears; US 131 / M-72 at Kalkaska; M-32 at East Jordan
- North end: US 31 at Charlevoix

Location
- Country: United States
- State: Michigan
- Counties: St. Joseph, Branch, Calhoun, Barry, Eaton, Ionia, Montcalm, Mecosta, Osceola, Missaukee, Kalkaska, Antrim, Charlevoix

Highway system
- Michigan State Trunkline Highway System; Interstate; US; State; Byways
← M-65	→ M-67

M-66 is a north–south state trunkline highway on the Lower Peninsula of the US state of Michigan. It runs from the Indiana state line in the south to Charlevoix in the north. M-66 is the only state highway to run the north–south distance of the Lower Peninsula. It starts as a continuation of State Road 9 (SR 9), which provides access to the Indiana Toll Road. The total length is approximately 272.9 miles (439.2 km), which includes almost 3.4 miles (5.5 km) of freeway between Interstate 94 (I-94) and downtown Battle Creek designated as I-194. A section of the highway immediately south of I-94 is an expressway, a type of divided limited-access highway, while the section along I-194 is a full freeway; otherwise M-66 is a two-lane rural highway. Two sections are listed on the National Highway System.

The first usage of the M-66 designation dates back to around July 1, 1919 with the rest of the original state highway system. At the time, the highway only extended between Lowell and Lakeview, a route now covered by M-91. The highway has been lengthened in a series of extensions north and south starting in 1925. A rerouting in 1944–45 removed M-66 from its original 1919 routing to replace another highway south of Six Lakes, the change that spawned M-91. The last big extension in 1965 resulted in the modern trans-peninsular highway route. The last modifications were shorter reroutings in the 1970s.

== Route description ==
M-66 runs for 266.399 miles (428.728 km) as an almost entirely a north–south undivided surface highway in western Michigan from the Indiana state line north to Lake Michigan at Charlevoix. Most of the highway is two-lane undivided rural highway. There is a section south of Battle Creek that is a four-lane expressway. Running north into the Cereal City, M-66 is concurrent with I-194, which is a full freeway. This section along I-194 is listed on the National Highway System (NHS), a system of highways important to the nation's economy, defense, and mobility. Another section of M-66 is included on the NHS where it is concurrent with either M-72 or U.S. Highway 131 (US 131) in Kalkaska or Antrim counties.

=== Indiana to Ionia ===
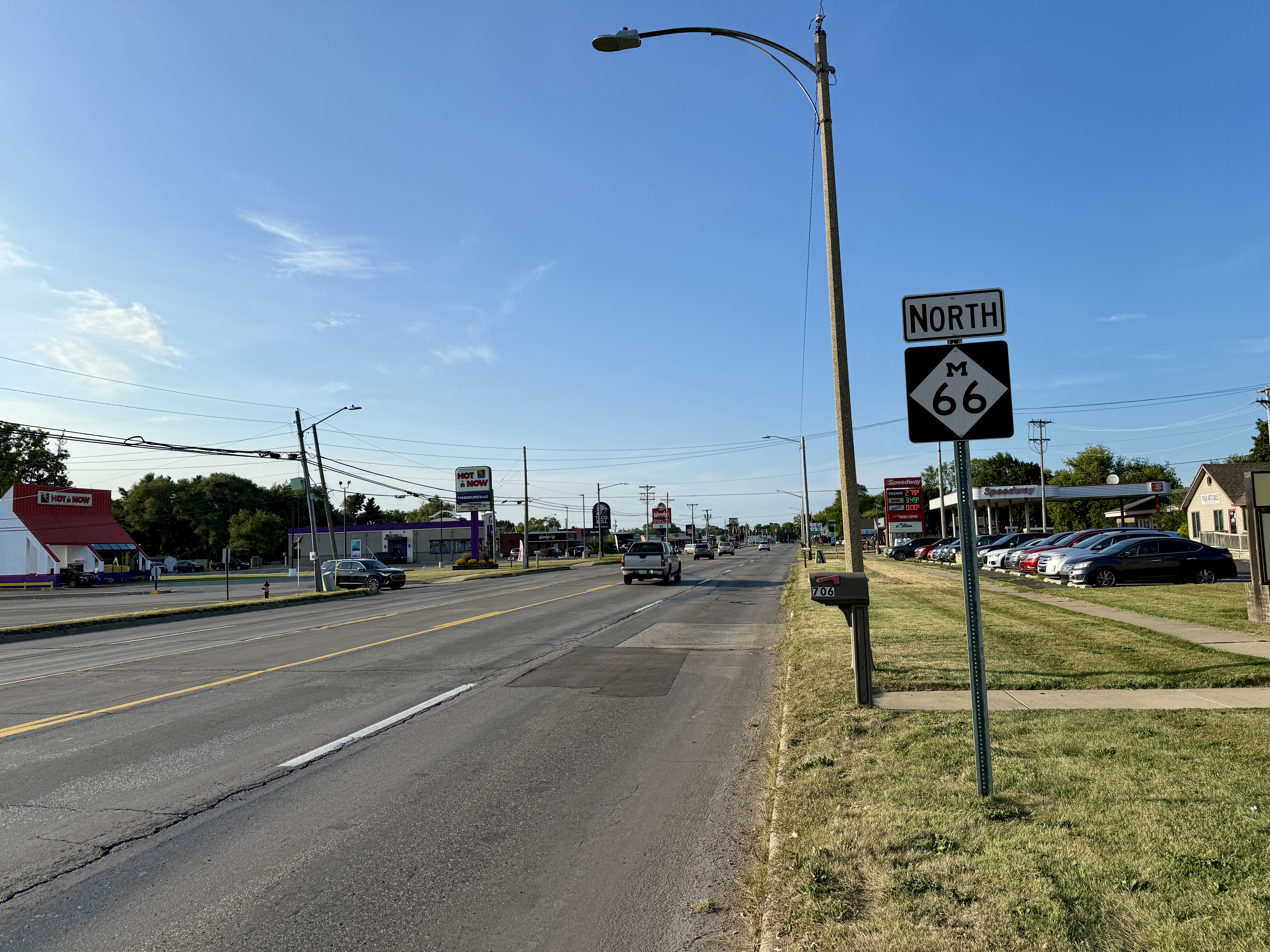
M-66 northbound in Sturgis

M-66 is a four-lane highway that connects with State Road 9 (SR 9) at the Indiana state line in southern St. Joseph County. The highway runs north to Sturgis through farm land where it turns east through town running concurrently with US 12 on Chicago Road. As it leaves Sturgis to the north it crosses a branch of the Michigan Southern Railroad, and it becomes a two-lane surface highway along Nottawa Street. The highway runs near several small lakes and crosses the Prairie River before meeting M-86. The two highways run north–south concurrently for about 1.9 miles (3.1 km) along the Nottawa–Colon township line. Farther north, M-66 crosses the St. Joseph River and meets M-60. M-60/M-66 run together to the east, crossing Nottawa Creek, then turning northeasterly in Leonidas and crossing into the northwest corner of Branch County. M-60 and M-66 separate west of Union City, and M-66 turns north into Calhoun County.

Running through woodland terrain in southern Calhoun County, M-66 passes through Athens, along Graham Lake and continues to the outskirts of Battle Creek. The highway widens first to a four-lane, limited access expressway south of the Lakeview Square Mall before becoming a full freeway at the interchange with I-94. It is at the transition to freeway that M-66 starts its concurrency with I-194. I-194/M-66 is known as the Sojourner Truth Downtown Parkway, but the locals still use the former semi-official (Note: MDOT's predecessor, the Michigan State Highway Department, called all auxiliary Interstate Highways "Penetrator" when planning the freeway network in the state.) nickname, "The Penetrator". The southern section of the freeway has the highest traffic levels along M-66 as measured by average annual daily traffic (AADT) in the survey conducted in 2009. The Michigan Department of Transportation (MDOT) calculates the AADT value as a tally of the average number of vehicles using a given stretch of roadway. I-194/M-66 carried 25,200 vehicles on the average day during the year; 980 trucks were included in that traffic. The freeway continues 3.374 miles (5.430 km) north into downtown Battle Creek along part of the Kalamazoo River and crossing a branch of the Canadian National Railway and Norfolk Southern Railway before ending at the at-grade intersection with Hamblin Avenue. I-194 ends, and M-66 continues northeast out of the Cereal City on Division Street and then northeast on Capital Avenue along the Battle Creek River.

M-66 continues northward through Barry County on Capital Avenue which becomes 9 Mile Road north of Baseline Road. The highway passes through Assyria before meeting M-79, with which it has a short concurrency, in Nashville. On the north side of the village, M-66 crosses the Thornapple River and continues north through mixed rural forest land and farm fields. Near Woodland, M-66 joins M-43 and the two run to the northeast and along the Barry–Eaton county line. M-43/M-66 meets M-50 at a four-way intersection southwest of Lake Odessa near Woodbury, and M-43 turns east leaving M-66 in favor of a concurrency with M-50. M-66 crosses a rail line of CSX Transportation and the county line on State Road. It meets I-96 in a rural southern part of the Ionia County south of Ionia. On the south edge of town, the highway passes the county airport and curves to the northeast becoming Dexter Street. While entering downtown Ionia, the trunkline crosses the Grand River and the abandoned mainline of the Grand Rapids Eastern Railroad near the county fairgrounds. M-66 turns west along M-21 (Lincoln Avenue) for two blocks before turning back to the north along State Street. The trunkline runs through the northern part of the county and meets M-44's eastern terminus near Woodard Lake.

=== Montcalm County and northward ===
In Montcalm County, M-66 intersects M-57 in a rural area south of Sheridan before running north on Sheridan Road through Stanton. The highway jogs west along Main Street in Stanton before returning to a northerly course on a discontinuous section of Sheridan Road. The roadway curves around the west end of Hemmingway Lake near Cannonsville Road. West of Edmore, M-66 turns northwesterly along M-46 on Edmore–Howard City Road to Six Lakes. M-66 separates there and returns to its northerly journey along Six Lakes Road between Little Bass Lake and First Lake. The road crosses into Mecosta County as 30th Avenue north of Six Lakes. The highway intersects M-20 at the intersection with 9 Mile Road in Remus. This area of rural Mecosta County is more heavily forested with rolling hills and sporadic farms. In Barryton, the roadway crosses the Chippewa River. M-66 continues north passing Merrill Lake before crossing into rural eastern Osceola County at Mesceola Road.

The highway meets US 10 near Sears after crossing the Pere Marquette State Trail. M-66 crosses the Muskegon River near a separate 9 Mile Road in Osceola County. It meets both M-115 and M-61 (16 Mile Road) south of Marion. The highway continues north and crosses the Great Lakes Central Railroad for the first time in Marion, before entering Missaukee County. The trunkline then turns westward on Stoney Corners Road toward McBain through farm land. In town it runs along Maple Street and then runs north toward Lake City on Morey Road. South of the Lake City, M-55 runs concurrently with M-66 by Missaukee Golf Course and into town along the eastern shore of Lake Missaukee. North of town, M-55 splits off to the east on Houghton Lake Road, and M-66 continues north to an intersection with the eastern terminus of M-42 in a rural forest. M-66 leaves Morey Road and follows Pioneer Road to the county line.

As the highway crosses into Kalkaska County it crosses the Manistee River. M-66 runs through rolling hills in woodlands through the unincorporated farming community of Lodi north to an intersection with M-72. The two highways travel west together over the Great Lakes Central Railroad before turning north and merging with US 131 on a route parallel to the rail line. US 131/M-66/M-72 follows and crosses a branch of the Boardman River along Cedar Street through downtown Kalkaska. North of the central business district, M-72 separates to the west and US 131/M-66 crosses through the Pere Marquette State Forest on the way to Antrim and Mancelona in Antrim County. The highway follows Williams Street through the twin towns, meeting the southern terminus of M-88 and western terminus of C-38 at the intersection with State Street in Mancelona. M-66 separates from US 131 and follows Mancelona–East Jordan Road out of town.

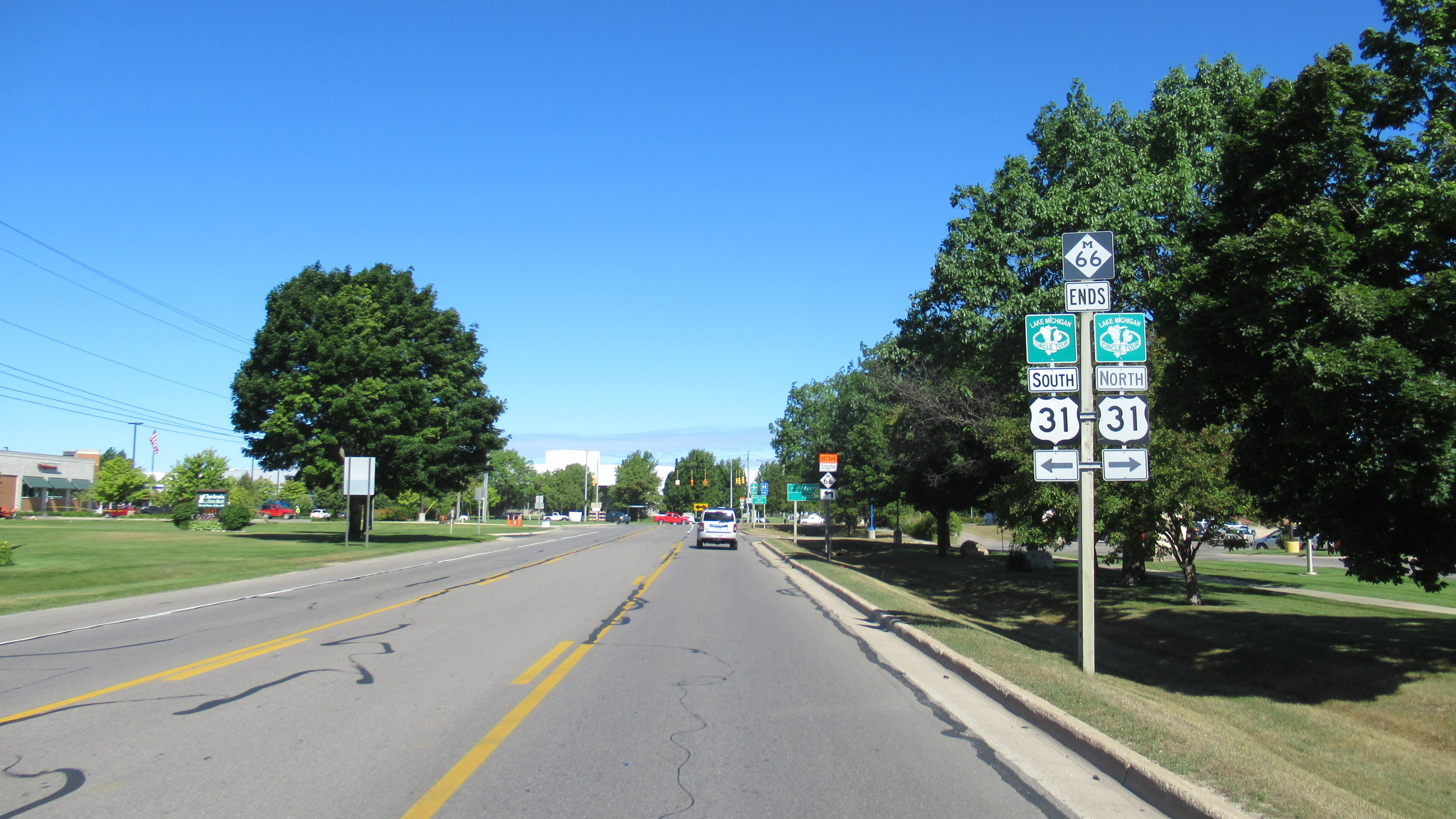
Northern terminus of M-66 at US 31 in Charlevoix

The section of M-66 north of the US 131 split had the highway's lowest AADT levels in the 2009 survey. MDOT reported that only 1,500 vehicles use this stretch of road in 2009. Of these vehicles, only were 140 trucks that used the segment of highway in 2009. The highway meanders through more forest lands through the community of Green River to East Jordan. M-66 follows Lake Street and turns to follow the western shore of the South Arm of Lake Charlevoix. The roadway turns inland through Ironton before returning to the lakeshore the rest of the way to Charlevoix. M-66 ends at an intersection with US 31 south of downtown next to Lake Michigan.

=== Services ===
MDOT provides a number of different services to motorists traveling along the state trunkline highway system. Along M-66, there are six different carpool lots located near Nashville, Woodland, Belding, Sheridan, Sears and Marion. There are additional services provided to travelers in the form of roadside parks and rest areas. There are two roadside parks along the highway, one is between Woodland and Woodbury, and the second is in Sheridan. The roadway also provides access to the Ionia State Recreation Area and a state harbor on Lake Charlevoix.

== History ==
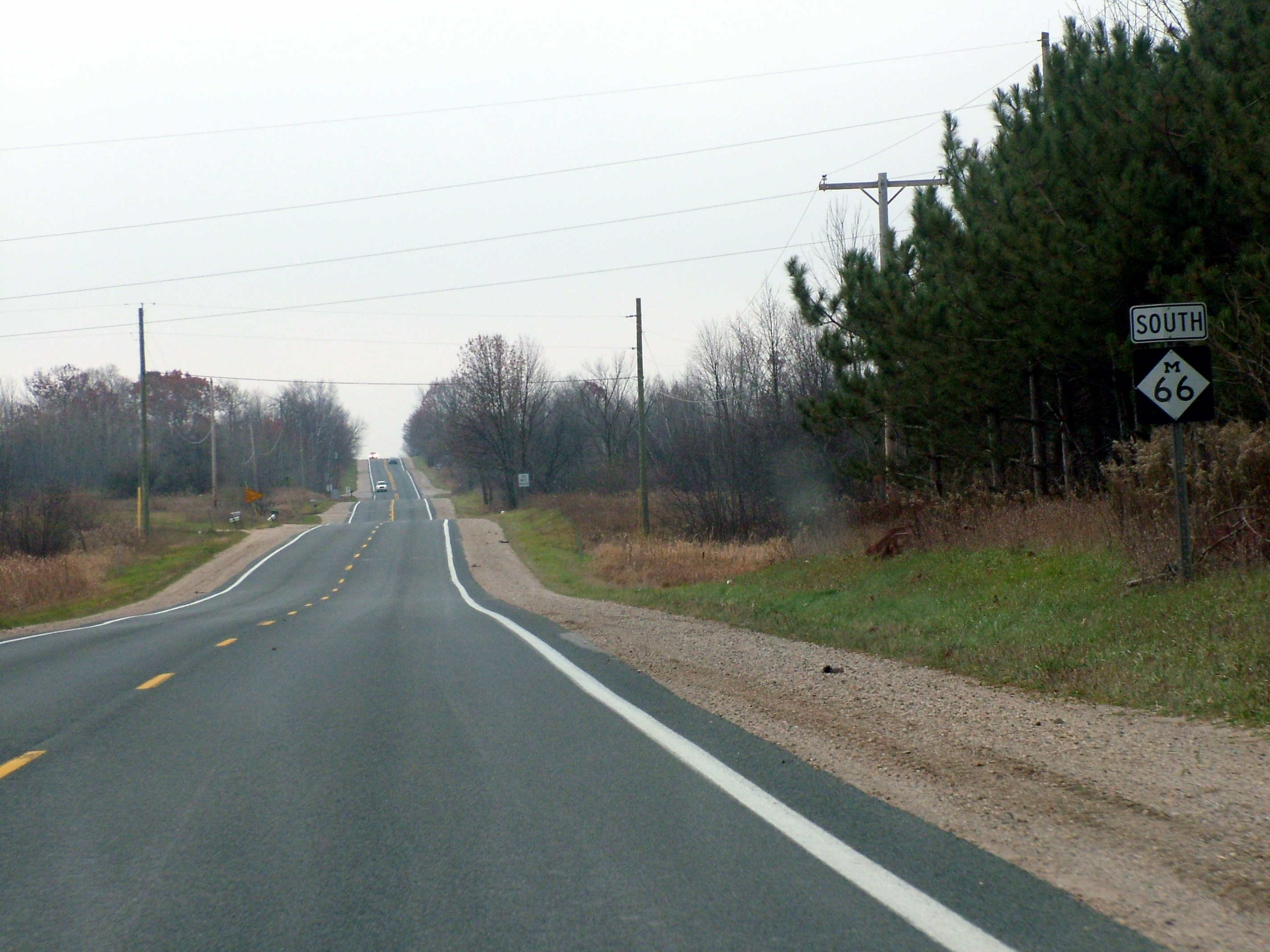
A characteristic view of M-66 in rural Michigan just south of the M-46 junction

M-66 was first signed along a roadway by July 1, 1919, between M-16 (now M-21) at Lowell and M-46 near Lakeview. The designation was extended in 1925 along M-46 to Six Lakes and then north to M-13 (now US 131) in Lodi. A further extension north from Lodi in 1929 or 1930 along M-131 to Mancelona, a short segment of M-88 and north to US 31 in Charlevoix. The southern end was extended to US 16 south of Lowell by 1931. A section of the northern extension was marked on maps through 1933 as "under construction". That section was cancelled in favor of another routing near Mancelona. A short bypass of Six Lakes added about a mile to the length of the roadway in 1936. The M-131 concurrency was switched to a US 131 concurrency when the latter was extended in 1939. This concurrency was shortened just before World War II when the Michigan State Highway Department (MSHD) rerouted US 131 along a new road between South Boardman and Kalkaska.

The MSHD completed a major rerouting of M-66 around 1944–45. The M-14 designation of the time was decommissioned and replaced with M-66. Starting at Six Lakes, M-66 turned west along M-46 instead of east and then turned south through Stanton and Ionia ending north of Battle Creek. The highway between Lowell and Lakeview was redesignated as M-91. A minor realignment in late 1950 removed two 90° curves near the Osceola–Missaukee county line and replaced them with a pair of sweeping curves.

The MSHD rerouted M-66 between Maple Grove and Nashville in mid-1953. In the changes, M-79 was extended along the new route of M-66 and then over M-214 to Hastings. M-66 was shifted off Assyria Road which was turned back to local control. Another realignment in 1954 shifted M-66 to the modern routing between the M-43 concurrency termini, removing M-43/M-66 from a section of M-50 in the process. The final section gravel section of M-66, approximately 11 miles (18 km) in length, was paved near Nashville in 1957. M-32 was extended along the northernmost section of M-66 in 1963.

M-66 was extended southerly from Assyria through Battle Creek to the Indiana state line replacing sections of M-78 in 1965. M-66 turned south and west along M-60 and new highway to Colon. The segment of former M-78 not used by M-66 was transferred to local control. The final section of M-78's roadway given to M-66 extended it all the way to the state line, resulting in a north–south trans-peninsular highway from Lake Michigan near Charlevoix to Indiana. M-66 is the only such highway to run the length of the Lower Peninsula. The extension allowed the Green Arrow Association to promote the whole length of the Green Arrow Route with a single highway number. The next year, M-66 was rerouted through Battle Creek to use the completed I-194 freeway.

A 90° turn in Missaukee County was removed north of Lake City in 1972. In late 1973 or early 1974, M-66 and M-72 were shifted around the south side of Kalkaska. Later in 1974, the M-32 concurrency was removed when M-32 was scaled back to its former terminus. A project in 1981 furthered the 1972 realignment in Missaukee County. About 4 miles (6.4 km) were shortened from the routing when the new alignment was built between Smithville and Phelps Road.

== Memorial designations ==
To capitalize on the opening of the Mackinac Bridge in 1957, local leaders in Battle Creek wanted to promote M-66 as a route north from Indiana to the bridge. They named the highway the Green Arrow Route as part of this marketing strategy. The color was to evoke the forests in the area, and arrow was meant to play on several historical connections. One of these was the Pennsylvania Railroad's Northern Arrow passenger train that once operated in the area. The official explanation was to tie into the history of Native Americans in the area, but the route was also "straight as an arrow". The backers also promoted the highway as a direct and scenic route to vacation country in the northern Lower Peninsula, avoiding most of the larger cities in the area. M-66 was given the Green Arrow Route name in Public Act 170 of 1959 between the Indiana state line and Kalkaska. Despite these efforts, M-66 failed to attract much traffic. When the Michigan Legislature recodified the memorial highway names in Public Act 142 of 2001, the Green Arrow Route was truncated to the northern border of Calhoun County, a change confirmed by Public Act 138 of 2004.

Born Isabella Baumfree in 1797, Sojourner Truth settled in the Battle Creek area in the 1840s. She travelled through the Midwest and New England speaking against slavery and for women's rights. She lived in the area until her death in 1883. Her connection to the state of Michigan was honored by the state American Revolution Bicentennial Commission in 1976 which urged the Michigan Legislature to name a highway in her honor. Public Act 93 of 1976 named all of M-66 in Calhoun County, including the segment that runs concurrently with I-194, as the Sojourner Truth Memorial Highway. The highway was dedicated to her on May 21, 1976.

The Cereal City Development Corporation (CCDC) asked the Legislature to amend the memorial designation in 1993. They felt that I-194/M-66 was better known to locals as The Penetrator, and they wished to restore emphasis to Truth. They asked for the "Sojourner Truth Downtown Parkway" name to be applied to "M-66 between Interstate 94 and Hamblin". The Legislature passed Public Act 208 of 1993 to affect the change, restoring "the link between Sojourner Truth and the City of Battle Creek, which was once the center of abolitionist sentiment in the state."

== Major intersections ==
County	Location	mi	km	Exit	Destinations	Notes
St. Joseph	Sturgis Township	0.000	0.000		SR 9 south – LaGrange	Southern terminus at Indiana state line
St. Joseph	Sturgis	2.659	4.279		US 12 west – Niles	Western end of US 12 concurrency
St. Joseph	Sturgis	3.169	5.100		US 12 east – Coldwater	Eastern end of US 12 concurrency
St. Joseph	Nottawa–Colon township line	11.588	18.649		M-86 west – Centreville	Southern end of M-86 concurrency
St. Joseph	Nottawa–Colon township line	13.325– 13.446	21.445– 21.639		M-86 east – Colon	Northern end of M-86 concurrency
St. Joseph	Mendon–Leonidas township line	17.876	28.769		M-60 west – Three Rivers	Western end of M-60 concurrency
Branch	Sherwood Township	28.102	45.226		M-60 east – Jackson	Eastern end of M-60 concurrency
Calhoun	Battle Creek	43.005	69.210	1	I-194 north I-94 – Detroit, Chicago	Signed as 1A (east) and 1B (west); M-66 joins the southern end of I-194 freeway; exit 98 on I-94
Calhoun	Battle Creek	45.088	72.562	2	M-96 (East Columbia Avenue)	
Calhoun	Battle Creek	46.110	74.207	3	BL I-94 (Dickman Road)	
Calhoun	Battle Creek	46.401	74.675		I-194 south	At-grade intersection; I-194 freeway ends and highway continues as M-66
Calhoun	Pennfield Township	53.571– 53.598	86.214– 86.258		M-78 east – Bellevue	Western terminus of M-78
Barry	Maple Grove Township	65.988	106.197		M-79 east – Charlotte	Southern end of M-79 concurrency
Barry	Nashville	68.219	109.788		M-79 west – Hastings	Northern end of M-79 concurrency
Barry	Woodland Township	77.019	123.950		M-43 west – Hastings	Western end of M-43 concurrency
Barry–Eaton county line	Woodland–Sunfield township line	79.426	127.824		M-43 east / M-50 – Lansing, Lake Odessa	Eastern end of M-43 concurrency on county line
Ionia	Berlin–Orange township line	87.938	141.522		I-96 – Grand Rapids, Lansing	Exit 67 on I-96
Ionia	Ionia	95.489	153.675		M-21 east – Flint	Western end of M-21 concurrency
Ionia	Ionia	95.689	153.997		M-21 west – Grand Rapids	Eastern end of M-21 concurrency
Ionia	Orleans–Ronald township line	101.541	163.414		M-44 west – Grand Rapids	Eastern terminus of M-44
Montcalm	Fairplain–Bushnell township line	108.867	175.204		M-57 – Greenville, Carson City	
Montcalm	Belvidere–Home township line	125.313	201.672		M-46 east – St. Louis	Eastern end of M-46 concurrency
Montcalm	Six Lakes	128.962	207.544		M-46 west – Howard City	Western end of M-46 concurrency
Mecosta	Remus	138.303	222.577		M-20 – Big Rapids, Mount Pleasant	
Osceola	Orient–Sylvan township line	145.290	233.822		US 10 – Reed City, Clare	
Osceola	Middle Branch Township	168.300	270.853		M-115 – Cadillac, Clare	
Osceola	Middle Branch Township	169.206	272.311		M-61 – Harrison	
Missaukee	Lake–Reeder township line	187.477	301.715		M-55 west – Cadillac	Southern end of M-55 concurrency
Missaukee	Lake City	192.541	309.865		M-55 east – Houghton Lake	Northern end of M-55 concurrency
Missaukee	Caldwell–Forest township line	194.544	313.088		M-42 west – Manton	Eastern terminus of M-42
Kalkaska	Kalkaska Township	219.257	352.860		M-72 east – Grayling	Southern end of M-72 concurrency
Kalkaska	Kalkaska	220.038	354.117		US 131 south – Cadillac	Southern end of US 131 concurrency
Kalkaska	Kalkaska	222.042	357.342		M-72 west – Traverse City	Northern end of US 131/M-72 concurrency
Antrim	Mancelona	234.638	377.613		M-88 north – Bellaire C-38 east – Waters	Southern terminus of M-88; western terminus of C-38
Antrim	Mancelona Township	235.442	378.907		US 131 north – Petoskey	Northern end of US 131
Charlevoix	East Jordan	253.639	408.192		M-32 east – Gaylord; C-48 – Boyne Falls, Ellsworth	Western terminus of M-32
Charlevoix	Charlevoix	266.399	428.728		US 31 / LMCT – Traverse City, Petoskey	Northern terminus on the shore of Lake Michigan
1.000 mi = 1.609 km; 1.000 km = 0.621 mi: Concurrency terminus
