= McBride, Michigan =

- Village
- Location in Montcalm County and the state of Michigan
- Coordinates: 43°21′07″N 85°02′39″W
- Country: United States
- State: Michigan
- County: Montcalm
- Township: Day

Area
  - Total: 0.39 sq mi (1.00 km^{2})
  - Land: 0.39 sq mi (1.00 km^{2})
  - Water: 0 sq mi (0.00 km^{2})
- Elevation: 958 ft (292 m)

Population (2020)
  - Total: 189
  - Density: 487.6/sq mi (188.28/km^{2})
- Time zone: UTC-5 (Eastern (EST))
  - Summer (DST): UTC-4 (EDT)
- ZIP code: 48852
- FIPS code: 26-50000
- GNIS feature ID: 2399284

McBride is a village in Montcalm County in the U.S. state of Michigan. The population was 189 at the 2020 census. The village is located within Day Township. The post office for the village, with ZIP code 48852, is named "McBrides" and provides P.O. box service to the village.

== History ==
The village is named for Alexander B. McBride, a settler from Wayne County, New York, who built a sawmill there in 1874. A railroad station was named "McBride's Mill", while the post office named "McBrides" opened on March 26, 1878, with McBride as the first postmaster. The village was platted by D. L. Jacobs in 1877. An adjacent settlement was platted with the name "Custer" by Phipps Wado on April 2, 1878, but it became a part of McBride when that village was incorporated in 1883.

== Geography ==
McBride is in northeastern Montcalm County, 6 miles (10 km) by road northeast of Stanton, the county seat, and 4 miles (6 km) south of Edmore. According to the U.S. Census Bureau, the village has a total area of 0.39 square miles (1.01 km^{2}), all land.

== Demographics ==
Historical population
Census	Pop.	Note	%±
1890	333		—
1900	289		−13.2%
1910	236		−18.3%
1920	220		−6.8%
1930	204		−7.3%
1940	186		−8.8%
1950	223		19.9%
1960	265		18.8%
1970	272		2.6%
1980	252		−7.4%
1990	236		−6.3%
2000	232		−1.7%
2010	205		−11.6%
2020	189		−7.8%
U.S. Decennial Census

=== 2010 census ===
As of the census of 2010, there were 205 people, 83 households, and 52 families residing in the village. The population density was 539.5 inhabitants per square mile (208.3/km^{2}). There were 97 housing units at an average density of 255.3 per square mile (98.6/km^{2}). The racial makeup of the village was 98.0% White, 0.5% Asian, and 1.5% from two or more races. Hispanic or Latino of any race were 1.0% of the population.

There were 83 households, of which 32.5% had children under the age of 18 living with them, 49.4% were married couples living together, 9.6% had a female householder with no husband present, 3.6% had a male householder with no wife present, and 37.3% were non-families. 33.7% of all households were made up of individuals, and 14.4% had someone living alone who was 65 years of age or older. The average household size was 2.47 and the average family size was 3.02.

The median age in the village was 39.4 years. 28.8% of residents were under the age of 18; 8.4% were between the ages of 18 and 24; 23% were from 25 to 44; 24.9% were from 45 to 64; and 15.1% were 65 years of age or older. The gender makeup of the village was 50.7% male and 49.3% female.

=== 2000 census ===
As of the census of 2000, there were 232 people, 86 households, and 63 families residing in the village. The population density was 642.3 inhabitants per square mile (248.0/km^{2}). There were 94 housing units at an average density of 260.3 per square mile (100.5/km^{2}). The racial makeup of the village was 98.71% White, 0.43% Native American, and 0.86% from two or more races.

There were 86 households, out of which 37.2% had children under the age of 18 living with them, 58.1% were married couples living together, 11.6% had a female householder with no husband present, and 26.7% were non-families. 24.4% of all households were made up of individuals, and 11.6% had someone living alone who was 65 years of age or older. The average household size was 2.70 and the average family size was 3.11.

In the village, the population was spread out, with 25.0% under the age of 18, 9.9% from 18 to 24, 30.2% from 25 to 44, 20.7% from 45 to 64, and 14.2% who were 65 years of age or older. The median age was 34 years. For every 100 females, there were 87.1 males. For every 100 females age 18 and over, there were 83.2 males.

The median income for a household in the village was $30,568, and the median income for a family was $30,694. Males had a median income of $25,000 versus $18,214 for females. The per capita income for the village was $13,376. About 8.2% of families and 18.8% of the population were below the poverty line, including 18.3% of those under the age of eighteen and 28.0% of those 65 or over.
