= Lakeview Airport (Michigan) =

Airport in Michigan, United States

Lakeview Airport Griffith Field
- IATA: none; ICAO: none; FAA LID: 13C

Summary
- Airport type: Public
- Owner: Village of Lakeview
- Serves: Lakeview, Michigan
- Elevation AMSL: 969 ft / 295 m
- Coordinates: 43°27′08″N 085°15′53″W

Map
- Location of airport in Michigan 13C (the United States)

Runways
Direction	Length		Surface
Direction	ft	m	Surface
10/28	3,499	1,066	Asphalt

Statistics (2021)
- Aircraft operations: 10,200
- Based aircraft: 25
- Source: Federal Aviation Administration

Lakeview Airport (FAA LID: 13C), also known as Griffith Field, is a public use airport in Montcalm County, Michigan, United States. It is owned by the village of Lakeview and located one nautical mile (2 km) northeast of its central business district. It is included in the Federal Aviation Administration (FAA) National Plan of Integrated Airport Systems for 2017–2021, in which it is categorized as a local general aviation facility.

== Facilities and aircraft ==
Lakeview Airport covers an area of 74 acres (30 ha) at an elevation of 969 feet (295 m) above mean sea level. It has one runway designated 10/28 with an asphalt surface measuring 3,499 by 75 feet (1,066 x 23 m).

The airport has a fixed-base operator that offers basic services like fueling.

For the 12-month period ending December 31, 2021, the airport had 10,200 aircraft operations, an average of 28 per day: 98% general aviation and 2% military. At that time there were 25 aircraft based at this airport, all single-engine airplanes.

== Accidents and incidents ==
- On August 26, 2009, a Piper Vagabond flown by a student pilot crashed while practicing takeoffs and landings at Lakeview Airport. A witness reported the aircraft began a left bank and then dove "as if it was dusting crops" before impacting the ground and bursting into flames. The probable cause of the accident was found to be the pilot's failure to maintain control of the aircraft.

== See also ==
- List of airports in Michigan
