= Lakeview Airport =

Lakeview Airport may refer to:

- Lakeview Airport (Michigan), also known as Griffith Field, an airport in Lakeview, Michigan, United States (FAA: 13C)

Other airports in places named Lakeview:

- Gaston's Airport in Lakeview, Arkansas, United States (FAA: 3M0)
- Lake County Airport (Oregon) in Lakeview, Oregon, United States (FAA: LKV)
