= Oramel B. Fuller =

American politician

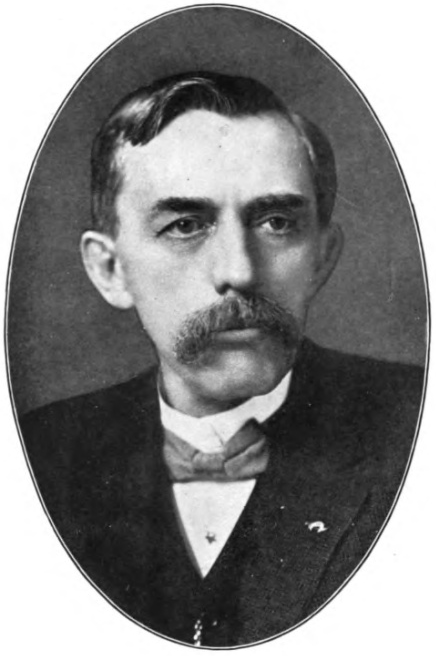

Michigan Auditor General
- In office 1909–1932
- Governor: Fred M. Warner; Chase Osborn; Woodbridge N. Ferris; Albert Sleeper; Alex J. Groesbeck; Fred W. Green; Wilber M. Brucker
- Preceded by: James B. Bradley
- Succeeded by: John K. Stack Jr.

Member of the Michigan Senate from the 30th district
- In office January 1, 1901 – 1904
- Preceded by: Frederick Kessler Baker
- Succeeded by: Willis N. Mills
- In office January 1, 1907 – 1908
- Preceded by: Willis N. Mills
- Succeeded by: Otto Fowle

Member of the Michigan House of Representatives from the Delta County district
- In office January 1, 1893 – 1898

Personal details
- Born: January 22, 1858 Jersey City, New Jersey, US
- Died: November 4, 1935 (aged 77) Lansing, Michigan, US
- Party: Republican
- Spouse: Jennie L. Van Zalingen
- Children: 2

Oramel Baum Fuller (January 22, 1858 – November 4, 1935) was a Michigan politician.

== Early life ==
Fuller was born on January 22, 1858, in Jersey City, New Jersey. By 1869, Fuller moved to Lansing, Michigan. Fuller attended schools in Lansing.

== Career ==
In 1874, Fuller worked as a lumber inspector in Muskegon, Michigan. In 1884, Fuller served as a justice of the peace and treasurer in Ford River, Michigan. On November 8, 1892, Fuller was elected as a Republican member of the Michigan House of Representatives from the Delta County district and was sworn in on January 4, 1893. He served in this position until 1898. During his last term serving in the Michigan House of Representatives, he served as the Speaker Pro Tempore. On November 6, 1900, Fuller was elected to the Michigan Senate representing the 30th district. From 1903 to 1904, Fuller would serve as President Pro Tempore of the Michigan Senate. He would serve until 1904, and then again be elected on November 6, 1906, and serve until 1908. From 1909 to 1932, Fuller served as Michigan Auditor General. In 1932, Fuller was not re-elected to this position.

== Personal life ==
Fuller married Jennie L. Van Zalingen on June 15, 1887, in Muskegon, Michigan. Together they had two children. In 1905, Fuller experienced a fall in his home which left him paralyzed, confining him to a wheelchair for the rest of his life. On May 29, 1922, Fuller was widowed upon the death of his wife.

Fuller was a Shriner, a Knight of Pythias, and an Elk. Fuller was a Freemason.

== Death ==
Fuller died on November 4, 1935, in Lansing, Michigan. Fuller was interred at Oakwood Cemetery in Muskegon, Michigan on November 7, 1935.
