= Great Lakes Adventist Academy =

Location
- 7477 Academy Road; Cedar Lake, Michigan 48812; United States; 43°23′58.6″N 84°58′31.9″W

Information
- Type: Private, College-prep, Day & boarding
- Motto: Mental · Manual · Moral
- Denomination: Seventh-day Adventist Church
- Established: 1898
- Principal: Delwin Garcia
- Teaching staff: 12.3 (on an FTE basis)
- Grades: 9-12
- Gender: Coeducational
- Enrollment: 167 (2017-18)
- Student to teacher ratio: 13.6
- Campus type: Rural, Urban
- Accreditation: MSA-CEES, AAA
- Website: glaa.net

Great Lakes Adventist Academy (GLAA) is a co-educational Seventh-day Adventist secondary boarding school located in Cedar Lake, Michigan, United States. It is a part of the Seventh-day Adventist education system, the world's second-largest Christian school system.

== Overview ==
Great Lakes Adventist Academy is a private, four-year, coeducational secondary school owned and operated by the Michigan Conference of Seventh-day Adventists. Over 90% of Great Lake Adventist Academy (GLAA) students are accepted to colleges and universities. It is fully accredited as a senior high school with the Board of Regents of the General Conference of Seventh-day Adventists and the North Central Association of Colleges and Schools. It was named the 2007 Seventh-day Adventist Academy of Excellence by The Alumni Awards Foundation.

GLAA, situated on a 400-acre (1.6 km^{2}) campus in rural Cedar Lake, Michigan, serves approximately 200 students. As a Christian school, GLAA admits students of any race to all the rights, privileges, programs and activities generally accorded or made available to the student body. No discrimination is made on the basis of race in the administration of educational policies, applications for admission, scholarship or loan programs, athletic or extra-curricular programs.

== History ==
The present-day Great Lakes Adventist Academy is the result of a merger of three Adventist boarding schools (the high school sections). The campus itself dates back to the oldest of its predecessor schools, Cedar Lake Academy.

Cedar Lake Academy was founded on December 2, 1898. During its early years, it was an "industrial school". Besides the core subjects of Bible, English, and Mathematics, the school also taught printing, tent-making, bookkeeping, agriculture, blacksmithing, beekeeping, food preparation, and carpentry. The first twelfth-grade students graduated in 1920. The 1960s and 1970s saw rapid expansion with the construction of new dormitory buildings, a new administration building, and the food service complex. The elementary school is located in newer buildings along the same road and functions separately.

Adelphian Academy was established on September 22, 1904, by the East Michigan Conference. At a farm near Holly was Professor and Mrs. J.G. Lamson, who were also the founders of Cedar Lake Academy, were the first teachers. The farm was the main industry until 1927 when woodworking was introduced. The school and farm (and later workshop) operated as a form of cooperative education where students were able to defray the cost of their tuition by working on the farm or in the workshop. The administration building not only housed dormitory rooms but also offices of the East Michigan Conference. As of May 1998, the former campus was listed in the Oakland County register of "closed landfills and dumpsites". The name lives on in Adelphian Junior Academy, which is still located in Holly but on a new campus.

Grand Ledge Academy in Grand Ledge, Michigan, near the state capital Lansing, was founded in 1958 by the Michigan Conference as a boarding school. A fire in the fall of 1967, severely damaged the girls' dormitory. By the following year, the boarding program was closed and Grand Ledge Academy became a day school. The school consolidated with Lansing and Grand Ledge Adventist Elementary Schools to form a K-12 school in 1982. It then became Mid-Michigan Adventist Academy and operated as a K-10 school until 1989, when it was also merged into GLAA. Elementary school students were transferred to the newly opened Greater Lansing Adventist School. The campus also hosted annual summer camps for Adventist youths throughout the state and region. During the 1950s it was the site of Camp Doss, named after Desmond Doss, where Medical Cadet Corps basic training took place. The property was sold in 1988 just prior to the merger and the buildings were torn down in 1994. The summer camp meetings tradition continues at the current GLAA campus each summer and is organized by the Michigan Conference.

On November 2, 1986, Adelphian Academy and Cedar Lake Academy merged to form Great Lakes Adventist Academy and consolidated at the Cedar Lake Academy campus. With the merger of MMAA into GLAA, this left only two other remaining Adventist academies – Battle Creek Academy (the first Adventist school founded by the now world-wide church) and Andrews Academy in Berrien Springs – and GLAA as the sole remaining Adventist boarding academy in Michigan.

=== Timeline ===
- 1898: Cedar Lake Academy was founded
- 1904: Adelphian Academy was founded
- 1958: Grand Ledge Academy was founded
- 1982: Grand Ledge Academy merged with two nearby feeder elementary schools, Lansing and Grand Ledge, to form Mid-Michigan Adventist Academy
- 1989: Mid-Michigan Adventist Academy was absorbed into GLAA

== See also ==
- List of Seventh-day Adventist secondary schools
