= Cowden Lake =

Lake in the state of Michigan, United States

- Location within Michigan
- Location: Montcalm County, Michigan
- Coordinates: 43°21′18″N 85°21′27″W
- Type: Natural freshwater lake
- Primary inflows: spring fed
- Basin countries: United States
- Max. length: 3,900 feet (1,200 m)
- Max. width: 2,050 feet (620 m)
- Max. depth: 62 feet (19 m)
- Surface elevation: 915 feet (279 m)
- Frozen: about 5 months of the year during winter
- Settlements: Coral, Howard City, Trufant (3 nearest)

Cowden Lake is a 128-acre (surface area) public lake located in Montcalm County, Michigan, 2.4 miles (4 km) east of the town of Coral. Residents with homes and cottages on Cowden Lake represent a mix of permanent residents and Michigan summer vacationers. Like many public lakes in Michigan, waterskiing, tubing (recreation), wakeboarding, fishing, and wake surfing are popular during the summer.

== See also ==
- List of lakes in Michigan
