= Montcalm Community College =

Community college in Sidney, Michigan, U.S.

- Type: Public community college
- Established: March 2, 1965
- President: Dr. Bradley J. Barrick
- Students: 1,600+
- Location: Sidney, Michigan, U.S. 43.2532°N 85.1001°W
- Mascot: Centurion
- Website: www.montcalm.edu

Montcalm Community College (MCC) is a public community college in Sidney, Michigan. Founded in 1965, Montcalm Community College had an enrollment of 2,080 students in 2005.

== Campus ==
The college's campus is off of Sydney Road in Montcalm County, Michigan.

== Athletics ==
MCC fields athletic teams known as the Centurions. They compete in the NJCAA.

=== Men's sports ===
- Basketball
- Bowling
- Cross Country
- Golf

=== Women's sports ===
- Basketball
- Bowling
- Cross Country
- Volleyball

=== Co-ed sports ===
- Clay Target Shooting

== Notable alumni ==
- Brian Calley, Lt. Governor of Michigan.
