= Forest Township, Missaukee County, Michigan =

Forest Township, Michigan
- Civil township
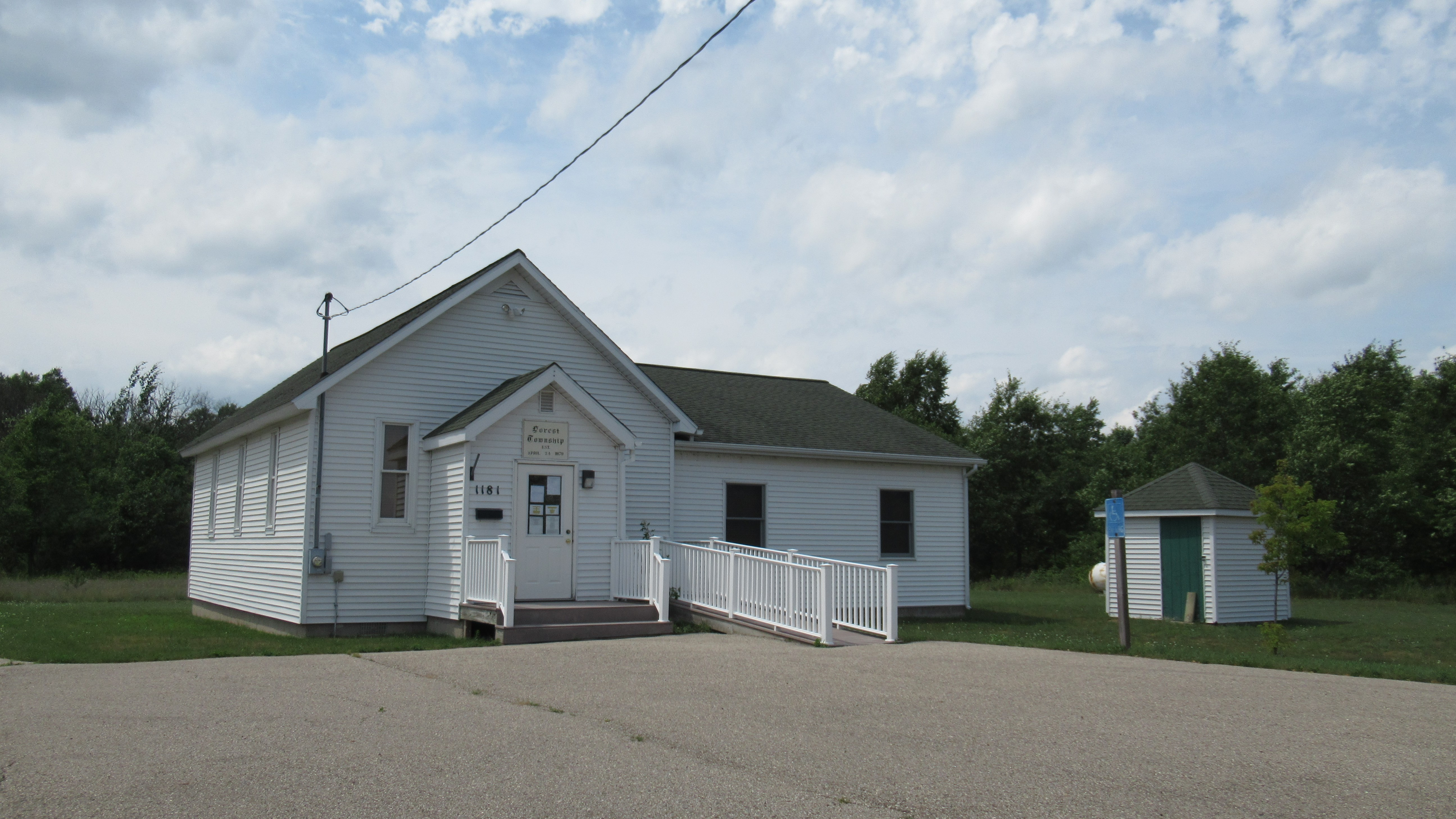
- Forest Township Hall

- Location within Missaukee County

- Location within the state of Michigan Location within the United States
- Coordinates: 44°22′48″N 85°09′26″W
- Country: United States
- State: Michigan
- County: Missaukee
- Established: 1879

Government
  - Supervisor: Samantha Peery
  - Clerk: LeAnn Vokes

Area
  - Total: 35.16 sq mi (91.06 km^{2})
  - Land: 35.13 sq mi (90.99 km^{2})
  - Water: 0.031 sq mi (0.08 km^{2})
- Elevation: 597 ft (182 m)

Population (2020)
  - Total: 1,184
  - Density: 33.7/sq mi (13.0/km^{2})
- Time zone: UTC-5 (Eastern (EST))
  - Summer (DST): UTC-4 (EDT)
- ZIP code(s): 49651 (Lake City)
- Area code: 231
- FIPS code: 26-29440
- GNIS feature ID: 1626297
- Website: Official website

Forest Township is a civil township of Missaukee County in the U.S. state of Michigan. The population was 1,184 at the 2020 census.

== Geography ==
The township is in central Missaukee County and is bordered to the southwest by Lake City, the county seat. According to the United States Census Bureau, the township has a total area of 35.16 square miles (91.06 km^{2}), of which 35.13 square miles (90.99 km^{2}) are land and 0.03 square miles (0.08 km^{2}), or 0.08%, are water. The West Branch of the Muskegon River rises in the eastern part of the township.

== Highways ==
- M-42 does not enter the township but has its eastern terminus at the township boundary with M-66.
- M-55 forms almost all of the southern boundary of the township.
- M-66 forms the entire western boundary of the township.

== Demographics ==
Historical population
Census	Pop.	Note	%±
1880	50		—
1890	193		286.0%
1900	285		47.7%
1910	389		36.5%
1920	326		−16.2%
1930	206		−36.8%
1940	378		83.5%
1950	372		−1.6%
1960	331		−11.0%
1970	441		33.2%
1980	728		65.1%
1990	878		20.6%
2000	1,082		23.2%
2010	1,157		6.9%
2020	1,184		2.3%
U.S. Decennial Census

As of the census of 2000, there were 1,082 people, 431 households, and 305 families residing in the township. The population density was 30.8 inhabitants per square mile (11.9/km^{2}). There were 678 housing units at an average density of 19.3 per square mile (7.5/km^{2}). The racial makeup of the township was 98.06% White, 0.37% Native American, and 1.57% from two or more races. Hispanic or Latino of any race were 0.74% of the population.

There were 431 households, out of which 31.6% had children under the age of 18 living with them, 56.4% were married couples living together, 9.7% had a female householder with no husband present, and 29.2% were non-families. 23.4% of all households were made up of individuals, and 9.5% had someone living alone who was 65 years of age or older. The average household size was 2.48 and the average family size was 2.86.

In the township the population was spread out, with 26.1% under the age of 18, 7.3% from 18 to 24, 29.4% from 25 to 44, 23.9% from 45 to 64, and 13.3% who were 65 years of age or older. The median age was 38 years. For every 100 females, there were 98.2 males. For every 100 females age 18 and over, there were 94.6 males.

The median income for a household in the township was $33,359, and the median income for a family was $38,047. Males had a median income of $30,912 versus $20,375 for females. The per capita income for the township was $15,417. About 10.0% of families and 11.3% of the population were below the poverty line, including 14.1% of those under age 18 and 16.0% of those age 65 or over.
