= Giles Gilbert House =

Historic house in Michigan, United States

- U.S. National Register of Historic Places
- Michigan State Historic Site
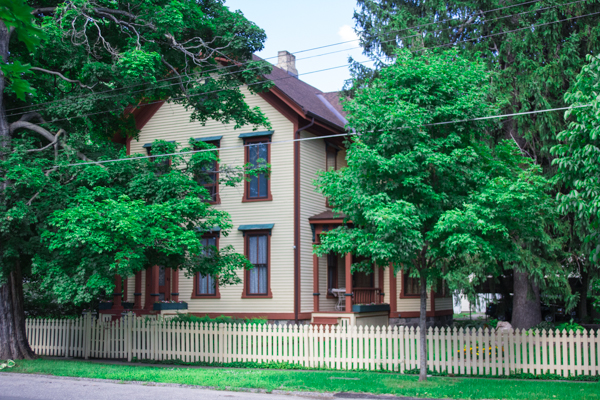

- Location within Michigan Location within the United States
- Interactive map
- Location: 306 N. Camburn St., Stanton, Michigan
- Coordinates: 43°17′40″N 85°4′48″W
- Area: less than one acre
- Built: 1877
- Architectural style: Late Victorian
- NRHP reference No.: 87000137

Significant dates
- Added to NRHP: February 12, 1987
- Designated MSHS: May 8, 1984

The Giles Gilbert House is a private house located at 306 N. Camburn Street in Stanton, Michigan. It was designated a Michigan State Historic Site in 1984 and listed on the National Register of Historic Places in 1987.

== History ==
Giles Gilbert was born in Wyoming County, New York in 1840, the youngest of eight children born to Hiram and Maria Gilbert. He attended Genesee Conference Seminary and worked on his father's farm until the Civil War broke out, at which point he enlisted in the 17th New York Volunteer Infantry Regiment. He served until 1863, after which he moved to Stanton and invested his savings in a mercantile business with Edwin K. Wood, another veteran of the 17th. The business soon became involved in lumbering, and eventually Gilbert bought out his partner in the lumbering operation, while Wood continued in the mercantile business.

In 1868, Gilbert married Frances Smith; the couple had three children. In 1877, he built this house for his own use, and lived there until 1882, when he moved to Mecosta, Michigan to continue lumbering.

His house in Stanton was later owned by James Willet, another prominent lumberman and mayor of Stanton, and by a succession of leading local merchants.

== Description ==
The Giles Gilbert House is a 13-room, two-story Late Victorian house clad in clapboard and sitting on a cut fieldstone foundation. The relatively plain facade is decorated with typical Late Victorian elements, including decorated trusses and oculus windows in the gables; and a jerkin head roof, chamfered posts, decorative brackets, and scrolled woodwork on the entry porch.
