= Evergreen Township, Montcalm County, Michigan =

Evergreen Township, Michigan
- Township
- Location within Michigan Location within the United States
- Coordinates: 43°14′44″N 85°1′40″W
- Country: United States
- State: Michigan
- County: Montcalm

Area
  - Total: 35.3 sq mi (91 km^{2})
  - Land: 34.6 sq mi (90 km^{2})
  - Water: 0.7 sq mi (1.8 km^{2})
- Elevation: 850 ft (260 m)

Population (2020)
  - Total: 2,941
  - Density: 84.9/sq mi (32.8/km^{2})
- Time zone: UTC-5 (Eastern (EST))
  - Summer (DST): UTC-4 (EDT)
- ZIP Codes: 48884 (Sheridan); 48888 (Stanton); 48818 (Crystal)
- FIPS code: 26-117-26720
- GNIS feature ID: 1626257
- Website: www.evergreen-township.com

Evergreen Township is a civil township of Montcalm County in the U.S. state of Michigan. The population was 2,941 at the 2020 census.

== History ==
Evergreen Township was established in 1856.

== Communities ==
- Fishville was a community centered on a sawmill, starting in 1879. It had a post office from 1886 until 1905.

== Geography ==
Evergreen Township is in southeastern Montcalm County and is bordered to the northwest by the city of Stanton, the county seat. Part of the village of Sheridan is in the southwest corner of the township. According to the U.S. Census Bureau, the township has a total area of 35.3 square miles (91 km^{2}), of which 34.7 square miles (90 km^{2}) are land and 0.7 square miles (1.8 km^{2}), or 1.94%, are water. The township is home to at least 11 named natural lakes. The township is drained by Fish Creek, a tributary of the Maple River and part of the Grand River watershed leading to Lake Michigan.

== Demographics ==
Historical population
Census	Pop.	Note	%±
1860	89		—
1870	489		449.4%
1880	1,411		188.5%
1890	1,308		−7.3%
1900	1,367		4.5%
1910	1,398		2.3%
1920	2,208		57.9%
1930	1,079		−51.1%
1940	1,183		9.6%
1950	1,131		−4.4%
1960	1,526		34.9%
1970	1,842		20.7%
1980	2,183		18.5%
1990	2,531		15.9%
2000	2,922		15.4%
2010	2,858		−2.2%
2020	2,941		2.9%
U.S. Decennial Census

As of the census of 2000, there were 2,922 people, 1,120 households, and 822 families residing in the township. The population density was 84.3 inhabitants per square mile (32.5/km^{2}). There were 1,327 housing units at an average density of 38.3 per square mile (14.8/km^{2}). The racial makeup of the township was 97.19% White, 0.41% African American, 0.82% Native American, 0.51% Asian, 0.07% Pacific Islander, 0.31% from other races, and 0.68% from two or more races. Hispanic or Latino of any race were 1.71% of the population.

There were 1,120 households, out of which 34.5% had children under the age of 18 living with them, 58.9% were married couples living together, 9.3% had a female householder with no husband present, and 26.6% were non-families. 21.4% of all households were made up of individuals, and 8.3% had someone living alone who was 65 years of age or older. The average household size was 2.61 and the average family size was 3.03.

In the township the population was spread out, with 27.7% under the age of 18, 8.4% from 18 to 24, 28.0% from 25 to 44, 23.4% from 45 to 64, and 12.6% who were 65 years of age or older. The median age was 36 years. For every 100 females, there were 97.0 males. For every 100 females age 18 and over, there were 98.1 males.

The median income for a household in the township was $33,604, and the median income for a family was $38,583. Males had a median income of $30,342 versus $25,625 for females. The per capita income for the township was $15,563. About 11.2% of families and 13.5% of the population were below the poverty line, including 18.0% of those under age 18 and 4.8% of those age 65 or over.
