= Crystal Township, Montcalm County, Michigan =

Crystal Township, Michigan
- Township
- Location within Michigan Location within the United States
- Coordinates: 43°15′37″N 84°54′15″W
- Country: United States
- State: Michigan
- County: Montcalm

Area
  - Total: 35.8 sq mi (93 km^{2})
  - Land: 34.0 sq mi (88 km^{2})
  - Water: 1.8 sq mi (4.7 km^{2})
- Elevation: 790 ft (240 m)

Population (2020)
  - Total: 2,619
  - Density: 77/sq mi (30/km^{2})
- Time zone: UTC-5 (Eastern (EST))
  - Summer (DST): UTC-4 (EDT)
- ZIP codes: 48818 (Crystal); 48811 (Carson City); 48884 (Sheridan); 48889 (Sumner)
- Area code: 989
- FIPS code: 26-117-19080
- GNIS feature ID: 1626144
- Website: crystal-township.com

Crystal Township is a civil township of Montcalm County in the U.S. state of Michigan. As of 2024, the township population was 2,670.

== Communities ==
Crystal is an unincorporated community and census-designated place in the northwest part of the township at 43°15′47″N 84°54′53″W. The Crystal post office, with ZIP code 48818, serves the northern portion of Crystal Township as well as portions of southern Ferris Township.

== Geography ==
The township is in southeastern Montcalm County and is bordered to the east by Gratiot County. According to the U.S. Census Bureau, the township has a total area of 35.8 square miles (93 km^{2}), of which 34.0 square miles (88 km^{2}) are land and 1.8 square miles (4.7 km^{2}), or 5.04%, are water. The township is drained mainly by Fish Creek, which crosses the township from west to southeast and is a tributary of the Maple River, part of the Grand River watershed flowing to Lake Michigan. The northeast corner of the township is drained by Carpenter Creek, a tributary of the Pine River, part of the watershed flowing to Saginaw Bay on Lake Huron. Crystal Lake, Mud Lake, and Duck Lake are water bodies in the northern part of the township.

== Demographics ==
Historical population
Census	Pop.	Note	%±
1860	222		—
1870	746		236.0%
1880	1,295		73.6%
1890	1,344		3.8%
1900	1,445		7.5%
1910	1,475		2.1%
1920	1,283		−13.0%
1930	1,234		−3.8%
1940	1,374		11.3%
1950	1,359		−1.1%
1960	1,557		14.6%
1970	1,781		14.4%
1980	2,224		24.9%
1990	2,541		14.3%
2000	2,824		11.1%
2010	2,689		−4.8%
2020	2,619		−2.6%
U.S. Decennial Census

As of the census of 2000, there were 2,824 people, 1,097 households, and 770 families residing in the township. The population density was 82.7 inhabitants per square mile (31.9/km^{2}). There were 1,594 housing units at an average density of 46.7 per square mile (18.0/km^{2}). The racial makeup of the township was 97.52% White, 0.14% African American, 0.39% Native American, 0.21% Asian, 0.39% from other races, and 1.35% from two or more races. Hispanic or Latino of any race were 0.99% of the population.

There were 1,097 households, out of which 30.4% had children under the age of 18 living with them, 57.0% were married couples living together, 9.8% had a female householder with no husband present, and 29.8% were non-families. 24.0% of all households were made up of individuals, and 9.2% had someone living alone who was 65 years of age or older. The average household size was 2.56 and the average family size was 3.02.

In the township the population was spread out, with 25.8% under the age of 18, 8.6% from 18 to 24, 26.5% from 25 to 44, 25.7% from 45 to 64, and 13.4% who were 65 years of age or older. The median age was 38 years. For every 100 females, there were 99.3 males. For every 100 females age 18 and over, there were 97.2 males.

The median income for a household in the township was $34,421, and the median income for a family was $41,016. Males had a median income of $31,034 versus $23,264 for females. The per capita income for the township was $17,231. About 5.2% of families and 10.0% of the population were below the poverty line, including 9.4% of those under age 18 and 5.6% of those age 65 or over.

== Culture ==
Water bodies like Crystal Lake significantly shape recreation and lifestyle in the township by providing a wide range of leisure opportunities and influencing the local economy, property values, and community culture.

Crystal Lake is a central hub for boating, fishing, swimming, water skiing, and ice-skating. The lake has hosted events like fishing contests, boat parades, water skiing competitions, and community education classes on canoeing. Annual festivities such as "Duck Days" also revolve around the lake, highlighting its role as a focal point for community gatherings and traditions. This emphasis on recreation fosters a sense of community and draws tourism, which in turn supports local businesses and services.

The recreational appeal of Crystal Lake contributes to higher property values along the lakeshore and in the surrounding area. However, water quality issues such as algal blooms or invasive species can reduce recreational opportunities and negatively affect property values and tourism.

Events like the annual "Walkabout" for students, which focuses on watershed science and stewardship, demonstrate how the lake shapes educational activities.

== Points of interest ==
- Crystal Motor Speedway
- Rainbow Gardens Roller Rink - Since 1948
- Crystal Lake Association - Since 1932
- Crystal Congregational Church
- Crystal Box Office Theater (1947)
