= Ionia County Airport =

- IATA: none; ICAO: none; FAA LID: Y70

Summary
- Airport type: Public
- Owner: Ionia County
- Location: Ionia, Michigan
- Elevation AMSL: 818 ft (249 m)
- Coordinates: 42°56′16″N 85°03′38″W

Map
- Location of airport in Michigan Y70 (the United States)

Runways
Direction	Length		Surface
Direction	ft	m	Surface
9/27	4,300	1,311	Asphalt
7/25	4,290	1,308	Turf

Statistics (2021)
- Aircraft operations: 21,500
- Based aircraft: 51

Ionia County Airport (FAA LID: Y70) is a public airport located 3 mi (5 km) south of Ionia, Michigan, United States. Opened in 1937, the airport is currently owned by Ionia County. It is included in the Federal Aviation Administration (FAA) National Plan of Integrated Airport Systems for 2017–2021, in which it is categorized as a local general aviation facility.

In 2023, the airport approved a measure to place a wind farm within the zoning radius of the airport.

== Facilities and aircraft ==
The airport has two runways. Runway 10/28 is 4298 x 75 ft (1310 x 23 m) and is asphalt. Runway 18/36 is 4261 x 340 ft (1299 x 104 m) and is turf.

For the 12-month period ending December 31, 2021, the airport had 21,500 aircraft operations, an average of 59 per day. This included 98% general aviation and 2% military. For the same time period, there were 51 aircraft based on the field: 30 single-engine and 3 multi-engine airplanes as well as 18 gliders.

=== Fixed-base operators ===
One fixed-base operator, SMAT LLC, operates on the field, offering, aircraft maintenance and training. Flight instruction consists of a Part 141 flight school.

The School of Missionary Aviation Technology (SMAT) also operates on the field, providing maintenance and flight instruction for aspiring missionary pilot-mechanics.

== See also ==
- List of airports in Michigan
