= Montcalm Township, Michigan =

- Township
- Location within Michigan Location within the United States
- Coordinates: 43°15′26″N 85°14′36″W
- Country: United States
- State: Michigan
- County: Montcalm

Area
  - Total: 36.4 sq mi (94 km^{2})
  - Land: 35.4 sq mi (92 km^{2})
  - Water: 1.0 sq mi (2.6 km^{2})
- Elevation: 889 ft (271 m)

Population (2020)
  - Total: 3,394
  - Density: 95.8/sq mi (37.0/km^{2})
- Time zone: UTC-5 (Eastern (EST))
  - Summer (DST): UTC-4 (EDT)
- ZIP codes: 48838 (Greenville); 49326 (Gowen); 48885 (Sidney); 48884 (Sheridan)
- FIPS code: 26-117-55140
- GNIS feature ID: 1626759
- Website: montcalmtownship.gov

Montcalm Township is a civil township of Montcalm County in the U.S. state of Michigan. The population was 3,394 at the 2020 census, up from 3,350 in 2010.

== Geography ==
The township is in southwestern Montcalm County and is partially bordered to the south by Greenville, the largest city in the county. The township is bordered to the west by Kent County. State highway M-91 crosses the center of the township, leading south into Greenville and north to Lakeview.

According to the U.S. Census Bureau, Montcalm Township has a total area of 36.4 square miles (94 km^{2}), of which 35.4 square miles (92 km^{2}) are land and 1.0 square mile (2.6 km^{2}), or 2.70%, are water. The Flat River, a tributary of the Grand River, flows southward across the western part of the township, while Dickerson Creek, a tributary of the Flat River, drains the eastern part of the township.

== Communities ==
- Gowen is an unincorporated community in the township on the Flat River at 43°15′06″N 85°18′07″W. Gowen began circa 1847 as a lumbering center and was first known as "Gregor's Mills", and later as "Kaywood". Colonel James Gowen, from Lancaster County, Pennsylvania, founded the present community and platted it in 1871. A post office was established on March 4, 1872, with Samuel N. Peck as the first postmaster. It was a station on the Detroit, Grand Rapids and Western Railroad. The Gowen post office, with ZIP code 49326, serves the western part of Montcalm Township, as well as portions of townships to the west, southwest, and north.

== Demographics ==
Historical population
Census	Pop.	Note	%±
1850	135		—
1860	364		169.6%
1870	1,006		176.4%
1880	1,724		71.4%
1890	1,510		−12.4%
1900	1,310		−13.2%
1910	1,131		−13.7%
1920	926		−18.1%
1930	873		−5.7%
1940	949		8.7%
1950	1,180		24.3%
1960	1,620		37.3%
1970	1,984		22.5%
1980	2,521		27.1%
1990	2,879		14.2%
2000	3,178		10.4%
2010	3,350		5.4%
2020	3,394		1.3%
U.S. Decennial Census

As of the census of 2000, there were 3,178 people, 1,154 households, and 887 families residing in the township. The population density was 89.0 inhabitants per square mile (34.4/km^{2}). There were 1,321 housing units at an average density of 37.0 per square mile (14.3/km^{2}). The racial makeup of the township was 98.24% White, 0.13% African American, 0.60% Native American, 0.09% Asian, 0.03% Pacific Islander, 0.28% from other races, and 0.63% from two or more races. Hispanic or Latino of any race were 1.26% of the population.

There were 1,154 households, out of which 36.6% had children under the age of 18 living with them, 62.6% were married couples living together, 9.4% had a female householder with no husband present, and 23.1% were non-families. 17.7% of all households were made up of individuals, and 5.9% had someone living alone who was 65 years of age or older. The average household size was 2.75 and the average family size was 3.08.

In the township the population was spread out, with 28.0% under the age of 18, 7.8% from 18 to 24, 30.4% from 25 to 44, 23.3% from 45 to 64, and 10.5% who were 65 years of age or older. The median age was 36 years. For every 100 females, there were 102.7 males. For every 100 females age 18 and over, there were 102.5 males.

The median income for a household in the township was $43,485, and the median income for a family was $50,558. Males had a median income of $35,389 versus $25,068 for females. The per capita income for the township was $17,591. About 3.4% of families and 7.4% of the population were below the poverty line, including 8.2% of those under age 18 and 4.5% of those age 65 or over.
