= Montcalm County, Michigan =

County in Michigan, United States

- County
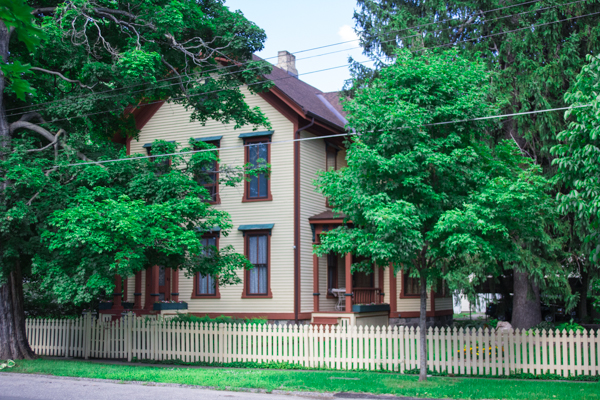
- Giles Gilbert House

- Location within the U.S. state of Michigan
- Coordinates: 43°19′N 85°09′W
- Country: United States
- State: Michigan
- Created: 1738
- Organized: 1850
- Named for: Louis-Joseph de Montcalm
- Seat: Stanton
- Largest city: Greenville

Area
  - Total: 721 sq mi (1,870 km^{2})
  - Land: 705 sq mi (1,830 km^{2})
  - Water: 15 sq mi (39 km^{2}) 2.1%

Population (2020)
  - Total: 66,614
  - Estimate (2025): 69,406 ▲
  - Density: 94.5/sq mi (36.5/km^{2})
- Time zone: UTC−5 (Eastern)
  - Summer (DST): UTC−4 (EDT)
- Congressional district: 2nd
- Website: montcalm.us

Montcalm County (/ˈmɒntkɔːlm/ MONT-kawlm) is a county in the U.S. state of Michigan. As of the 2020 Census, the population was 66,614. The county is geographically located in the West Michigan region of the Lower Peninsula. The county seat is Stanton, and the largest city is Greenville. The county is named for General Marquis Louis-Joseph de Montcalm, military commander of French troops during the French and Indian War. The county was set off in 1831 and organized in 1850.

Montcalm County is part of the Grand Rapids metropolitan area.

== Geography ==
According to the U.S. Census Bureau, the county has a total area of 721 square miles (1,870 km^{2}), of which 705 square miles (1,830 km^{2}) is land and 15 square miles (39 km^{2}) (2.1%) is water.

=== Adjacent counties ===
- Isabella County (northeast)
- Mecosta County (north)
- Gratiot County (east)
- Newaygo County (west)
- Ionia County (south)
- Kent County (southwest)
- Clinton County (southeast)

=== National protected area ===
- Manistee National Forest (part)

=== Major highways ===
- US 131
- M-46
- M-57
- M-66
- M-82
- M-91

== Demographics ==
Historical population
Census	Pop.	Note	%±
1850	891		—
1860	3,968		345.3%
1870	13,629		243.5%
1880	33,148		143.2%
1890	32,754		−1.2%
1900	32,754		0.0%
1910	32,069		−2.1%
1920	30,441		−5.1%
1930	27,471		−9.8%
1940	28,581		4.0%
1950	31,013		8.5%
1960	35,795		15.4%
1970	39,660		10.8%
1980	47,555		19.9%
1990	53,059		11.6%
2000	61,226		15.4%
2010	63,342		3.5%
2020	66,614		5.2%
2025 (est.)	69,406	▲	4.2%
U.S. Decennial Census; 1790-1960 1900-1990; 1990-2000 2010-2018

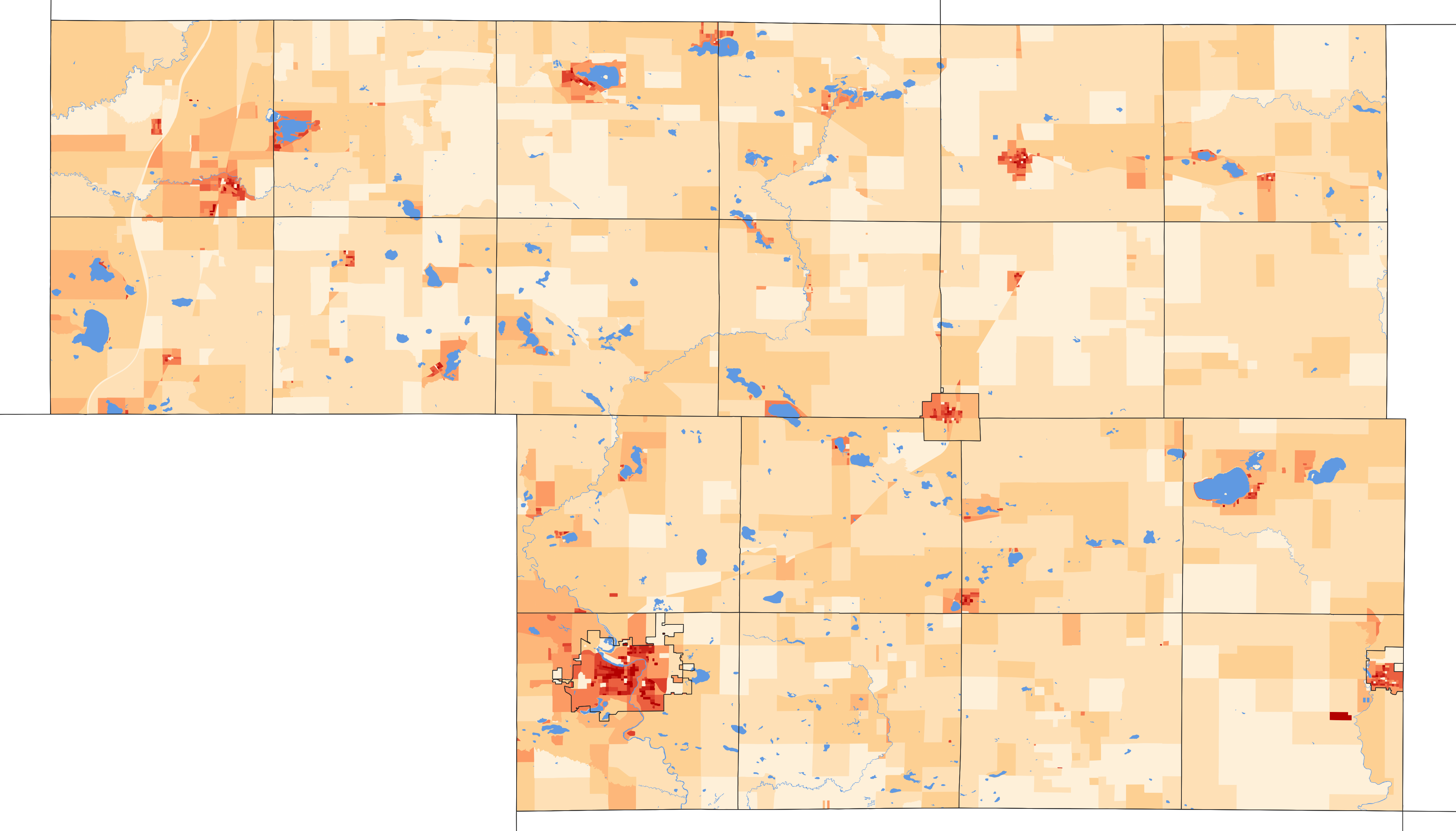
2020 population density of Montcalm County MI by census block

=== Racial and ethnic composition ===
Montcalm County, Michigan – Racial and ethnic composition Note: the US Census treats Hispanic/Latino as an ethnic category. This table excludes Latinos from the racial categories and assigns them to a separate category. Hispanics/Latinos may be of any race.
Race / Ethnicity (NH = Non-Hispanic)	Pop 1980	Pop 1990	Pop 2000	Pop 2010	Pop 2020	% 1980	% 1990	% 2000	% 2010	% 2020
White alone (NH)	46,583	50,714	57,313	58,635	58,880	97.96%	95.58%	93.55%	92.57%	88.39%
Black or African American alone (NH)	112	949	1,308	1,476	2,118	0.24%	1.79%	2.13%	2.33%	3.18%
Native American or Alaska Native alone (NH)	161	352	330	269	212	0.34%	0.66%	0.54%	0.42%	0.32%
Asian alone (NH)	111	144	154	220	225	0.23%	0.27%	0.25%	0.35%	0.34%
Native Hawaiian or Pacific Islander alone (NH)	x	x	21	15	23	x	x	0.03%	0.02%	0.03%
Other race alone (NH)	7	12	13	20	136	0.01%	0.02%	0.02%	0.03%	0.20%
Mixed race or Multiracial (NH)	x	x	733	775	2,323	x	x	1.20%	1.22%	3.49%
Hispanic or Latino (any race)	581	888	1,394	1,932	2,697	1.22%	1.67%	2.28%	3.05%	4.05%
Total	47,555	53,059	61,266	63,342	66,614	100.00%	100.00%	100.00%	100.00%	100.00%

=== 2020 census ===
As of the 2020 census, the county had a population of 66,614. The median age was 40.9 years, 21.5% were under the age of 18, and 17.6% were 65 years of age or older. For every 100 females there were 114.7 males, and for every 100 females age 18 and over there were 117.8 males.

The racial makeup of the county was 90.2% White, 3.2% Black or African American, 0.4% American Indian and Alaska Native, 0.3% Asian, <0.1% Native Hawaiian and Pacific Islander, 1.1% from some other race, and 4.7% from two or more races. Hispanic or Latino residents of any race comprised 4.0% of the population.

15.4% of residents lived in urban areas, while 84.6% lived in rural areas.

There were 24,153 households in the county, of which 29.6% had children under the age of 18 living in them. Of all households, 50.7% were married-couple households, 18.2% were households with a male householder and no spouse or partner present, and 22.4% were households with a female householder and no spouse or partner present. About 25.5% of all households were made up of individuals and 11.5% had someone living alone who was 65 years of age or older.

There were 27,894 housing units, of which 13.4% were vacant. Among occupied housing units, 80.3% were owner-occupied and 19.7% were renter-occupied. The homeowner vacancy rate was 1.4% and the rental vacancy rate was 4.8%.

=== 2010 census ===
According to a 2010 American Community Survey estimate, 25.5% of the population were of English ancestry, 22.5% were of German ancestry, 9.5% were of Irish ancestry, 6.0% were of Dutch ancestry, and 5.7% were of Danish ancestry. 96.4% spoke only English at home, while 2.1% spoke Spanish.

=== 2000 census ===
As of the census of 2000, there were 61,266 people, 22,079 households, and 16,183 families residing in the county. The population density was 86 people per square mile (33 people/km^{2}). There were 25,900 housing units at an average density of 37 per square mile (14/km^{2}). The racial makeup of the county was 94.83% White, 2.17% Black or African American, 0.60% Native American, 0.26% Asian, 0.05% Pacific Islander, 0.64% from other races, and 1.46% from two or more races. 2.28% of the population were Hispanic or Latino of any race.

There were 22,079 households, out of which 35.30% had children under the age of 18 living with them, 58.80% were married couples living together, 9.70% had a female householder with no husband present, and 26.70% were non-families. 21.90% of all households were made up of individuals, and 9.20% had someone living alone who was 65 years of age or older. The average household size was 2.65 and the average family size was 3.07.

In the county, the population was spread out, with 27.10% under the age of 18, 8.30% from 18 to 24, 30.20% from 25 to 44, 22.30% from 45 to 64, and 12.10% who were 65 years of age or older. The median age was 36 years. For every 100 females there were 105.50 males. For every 100 females age 18 and over, there were 106.00 males.

The median income for a household in the county was $37,218, and the median income for a family was $42,823. Males had a median income of $32,635 versus $23,645 for females. The per capita income for the county was $16,183. About 7.40% of families and 10.90% of the population were below the poverty line, including 14.00% of those under age 18 and 8.70% of those age 65 or over.

== Government ==
United States presidential election results for Montcalm County, Michigan
Year	Republican		Democratic		Third party(ies)	
Year	No.	%	No.	%	No.	%
1884	3,857	49.32%	3,788	48.43%	176	2.25%
1888	4,480	53.38%	3,495	41.64%	418	4.98%
1892	3,623	53.31%	2,205	32.45%	968	14.24%
1896	4,523	54.23%	3,651	43.78%	166	1.99%
1900	4,826	63.15%	2,636	34.49%	180	2.36%
1904	5,314	76.73%	1,372	19.81%	240	3.47%
1908	4,558	69.05%	1,715	25.98%	328	4.97%
1912	1,874	28.80%	1,373	21.10%	3,261	50.11%
1916	3,894	56.00%	2,801	40.28%	258	3.71%
1920	6,644	77.27%	1,695	19.71%	259	3.01%
1924	6,942	78.97%	1,396	15.88%	453	5.15%
1928	7,691	82.54%	1,572	16.87%	55	0.59%
1932	5,166	45.30%	5,704	50.02%	533	4.67%
1936	5,031	46.05%	4,950	45.31%	944	8.64%
1940	7,633	64.39%	4,119	34.74%	103	0.87%
1944	7,525	69.74%	3,168	29.36%	97	0.90%
1948	6,081	65.14%	2,999	32.13%	255	2.73%
1952	9,946	71.42%	3,844	27.60%	136	0.98%
1956	9,759	69.80%	4,189	29.96%	33	0.24%
1960	10,085	67.72%	4,767	32.01%	40	0.27%
1964	5,181	36.55%	8,970	63.27%	26	0.18%
1968	8,329	55.89%	5,303	35.59%	1,270	8.52%
1972	9,591	61.97%	5,602	36.19%	285	1.84%
1976	10,439	60.36%	6,684	38.65%	171	0.99%
1980	10,822	56.51%	6,706	35.02%	1,622	8.47%
1984	13,109	70.14%	5,491	29.38%	89	0.48%
1988	10,963	58.46%	7,664	40.87%	127	0.68%
1992	8,420	36.96%	8,730	38.32%	5,630	24.71%
1996	8,679	40.47%	10,053	46.88%	2,714	12.66%
2000	12,696	55.43%	9,627	42.03%	581	2.54%
2004	14,968	55.99%	11,471	42.91%	295	1.10%
2008	13,291	49.05%	13,208	48.75%	597	2.20%
2012	13,621	53.32%	11,430	44.74%	497	1.95%
2016	16,907	63.18%	7,874	29.42%	1,979	7.40%
2020	21,815	67.88%	9,703	30.19%	620	1.93%
2024	23,946	68.72%	10,368	29.75%	531	1.52%

United States Senate election results for Montcalm County, Michigan1
Year	Republican		Democratic		Third party(ies)	
Year	No.	%	No.	%	No.	%
2024	22,944	66.84%	10,270	29.92%	1,114	3.25%

Michigan Gubernatorial election results for Montcalm County
Year	Republican		Democratic		Third party(ies)	
Year	No.	%	No.	%	No.	%
2022	16,165	61.24%	9,622	36.45%	608	2.30%

The county government operates the jail, maintains rural roads, operates the major local courts, keeps files of deeds and mortgages, maintains vital records, administers public health regulations, and participates with the state in the provision of welfare and other social services. The county board of commissioners controls the budget but has only limited authority to make laws or ordinances. In Michigan, most local government functions — police and fire, building and zoning, tax assessment, street maintenance, etc. — are the responsibility of individual cities and townships.

=== Elected officials ===
- Prosecuting Attorney: Thomas Ginster
- Sheriff: Michael J. Williams
- County Clerk: Kristen Millard
- County Treasurer: JoAnne Vukin
- Register of Deeds: Kimberly Kuhn
- Drain Commissioner: Todd Sattler
- County Commission:Chris Johnston; Nathan Alexander; Adam Petersen; Patrick Q. Carr; Matt Murray; Scott Painter; Charlie Mahar
- Road Commissioners: Dale J. Linton; Bob Brundage; S. Michael Scott

(information as of August 2025)

== Communities ==
=== Cities ===
- Carson City
- Greenville
- Stanton (county seat)

=== Villages ===
- Edmore
- Howard City
- Lakeview
- McBride
- Pierson
- Sheridan

=== Census-designated places ===
- Crystal
- Trufant

=== Other unincorporated communities ===
- Amble
- Cedar Lake
- Conger
- Coral
- Entrican
- Fenwick
- Gowen
- Langston
- Sidney
- Six Lakes
- Vestaburg
- Westville
- Wyman

=== Townships ===
- Belvidere Township
- Bloomer Township
- Bushnell Township
- Cato Township
- Crystal Township
- Day Township
- Douglass Township
- Eureka Charter Township
- Evergreen Township
- Fairplain Township
- Ferris Township
- Home Township
- Maple Valley Township
- Montcalm Township
- Pierson Township
- Pine Township
- Reynolds Township
- Richland Township
- Sidney Township
- Winfield Township

== Education ==
The county has nine libraries, including the Montcalm Community College Library, Carson City Public Library, Crystal Community Library, Flat River Community Library, Home Township Library, Reynolds Township Library, Richland Township Library, Tamarack District Library, and White Pine Library.

The county also has 8 public school districts, including Carson City Crystal Area School District, Central Montcalm Public Schools, Greenville Public Schools, Lakeview Public Schools, Montabella Community Schools, Montcalm Area ISD, Tri County Area Schools, and Vestaburg Community Schools.

Finally, the county has one community college, Montcalm Community College.

== See also ==
- Cowden Lake
- List of Michigan State Historic Sites in Montcalm County, Michigan
- National Register of Historic Places listings in Montcalm County, Michigan
