= Crystal, Michigan =

- Census-designated place
- Location within Michigan Location within the United States
- Coordinates: 43°15′51″N 84°56′39″W
- Country: United States
- State: Michigan
- County: Montcalm
- Township: Crystal

Area
  - Total: 4.04 sq mi (10.46 km^{2})
  - Land: 2.76 sq mi (7.15 km^{2})
  - Water: 1.27 sq mi (3.30 km^{2})
- Elevation: 801 ft (244 m)

Population (2020)
  - Total: 888
  - Density: 321.6/sq mi (124.17/km^{2})
- Time zone: UTC-5 (Eastern (EST))
  - Summer (DST): UTC-4 (EDT)
- ZIP Code: 48818
- Area code: 989
- FIPS code: 26-19060
- GNIS feature ID: 2804351

Crystal is a census-designated place (CDP) comprising the main community in Crystal Township, Montcalm County, Michigan, United States. As of the 2020 census, it had a population of 888. The CDP includes the village proper of Crystal, at the east end of Crystal Lake, as well as all of the land surrounding the lake.

== History ==
The first settlers in the area were lumbermen, brothers John W. and Humphrey Smith in 1853. The present community began in 1857 when Enos P. Drake built a sawmill on land he co-owned with Samuel Burtch. Asa Ward recorded a plat for the settlement, and Alfred A. Proctor became the first postmaster on March 2, 1857. It is named for the nearby Crystal Lake.

The community was first listed as a census-designated place prior to the 2020 census.

== Geography ==
Crystal is in eastern Montcalm County, in the northeast part of Crystal Township. It is 10 miles (16 km) by road east-southeast of Stanton, the county seat, 9 miles (14 km) northwest of Carson City, and 20 miles (32 km) southwest of Alma.

According to the U.S. Census Bureau, the Crystal CDP has a total area of 4.04 square miles (10.46 km^{2}), of which 2.76 square miles (7.15 km^{2}) are land and 1.28 square miles (3.32 km^{2}), or 31.6%, are water. Crystal Lake occupies the center of the CDP limits, while Mud Lake is in the northeast. The settlement of Crystal is centered on the east shore of Crystal Lake. Water drains from Crystal Lake, at 799 feet (244 m) above sea level, into Mud Lake, at 797 feet (243 m), then east and south toward Fish Creek, a tributary of the Maple River and part of the Grand River watershed leading west to Lake Michigan.

== Demographics ==
Historical population
Census	Pop.	Note	%±
2020	888		—
U.S. Decennial Census
