= Ferris Township, Michigan =

- Township
- Location within Michigan Location within the United States
- Coordinates: 43°19′46″N 84°54′55″W
- Country: United States
- State: Michigan
- County: Montcalm

Area
  - Total: 36.11 sq mi (93.5 km^{2})
  - Land: 36.04 sq mi (93.3 km^{2})
  - Water: 0.07 sq mi (0.18 km^{2})
- Elevation: 896 ft (273 m)

Population (2020)
  - Total: 1,331
  - Density: 36.9/sq mi (14.2/km^{2})
- Time zone: UTC-5 (Eastern (EST))
  - Summer (DST): UTC-4 (EDT)
- ZIP Codes: 48891 (Vestaburg); 48829 (Edmore); 48877 (Riverdale); 48818 (Crystal); 48888 (Stanton)
- FIPS code: 26-117-27900
- GNIS feature ID: 1626278
- Website: www.montcalm.us/394/Ferris-Township

Ferris Township is a civil township of Montcalm County in the U.S. state of Michigan. The population was 1,331 at the 2020 census.

The township was established in 1857.

== Geography ==
Ferris Township is in eastern Montcalm County, with its eastern border following the Gratiot County line. The center of the township is 11 miles (18 km) southeast of Edmore and the same distance northeast of Stanton, the county seat.

According to the U.S. Census Bureau, the township has a total area of 36.1 square miles (93 km^{2}), of which 0.07 square miles (0.18 km^{2}), or 0.20%, are water. The eastern part of the township is drained by the Pine River, a tributary of the Chippewa River flowing east toward Lake Huron, while the western side is drained by Fish Creek, a south-flowing tributary of the Maple River, part of the Grand River watershed flowing west toward Lake Michigan.

== Demographics ==
Historical population
Census	Pop.	Note	%±
1860	184		—
1870	494		168.5%
1880	1,192		141.3%
1890	1,314		10.2%
1900	1,163		−11.5%
1910	1,148		−1.3%
1920	870		−24.2%
1930	769		−11.6%
1940	876		13.9%
1950	840		−4.1%
1960	801		−4.6%
1970	991		23.7%
1980	1,133		14.3%
1990	1,189		4.9%
2000	1,379		16.0%
2010	1,422		3.1%
2020	1,331		−6.4%
U.S. Decennial Census

As of the census of 2000, there were 1,379 people, 486 households, and 394 families residing in the township. The population density was 38.2 inhabitants per square mile (14.7/km^{2}). There were 566 housing units at an average density of 15.7 per square mile (6.1/km^{2}). The racial makeup of the township was 98.19% White, 0.29% African American, 0.15% Native American, 0.07% Asian, 0.07% Pacific Islander, 0.29% from other races, and 0.94% from two or more races. Hispanic or Latino of any race were 1.23% of the population.

There were 486 households, out of which 38.5% had children under the age of 18 living with them, 69.1% were married couples living together, 7.2% had a female householder with no husband present, and 18.9% were non-families. 15.0% of all households were made up of individuals, and 6.0% had someone living alone who was 65 years of age or older. The average household size was 2.84 and the average family size was 3.12.

In the township the population was spread out, with 28.4% under the age of 18, 8.8% from 18 to 24, 29.9% from 25 to 44, 21.9% from 45 to 64, and 11.0% who were 65 years of age or older. The median age was 35 years. For every 100 females, there were 100.4 males. For every 100 females age 18 and over, there were 98.2 males.

The median income for a household in the township was $35,820, and the median income for a family was $36,932. Males had a median income of $29,219 versus $20,529 for females. The per capita income for the township was $15,184. About 6.7% of families and 9.7% of the population were below the poverty line, including 15.1% of those under age 18 and 4.2% of those age 65 or over.
