= Sidney Township, Michigan =

- Township
- Location within Michigan Location within the United States
- Coordinates: 43°14′52″N 85°7′52″W
- Country: United States
- State: Michigan
- County: Montcalm

Area
  - Total: 35.0 sq mi (91 km^{2})
  - Land: 33.9 sq mi (88 km^{2})
  - Water: 1.1 sq mi (2.8 km^{2})
- Elevation: 879 ft (268 m)

Population (2020)
  - Total: 2,538
  - Density: 74.8/sq mi (28.9/km^{2})
- Time zone: UTC-5 (Eastern (EST))
  - Summer (DST): UTC-4 (EDT)
- ZIP codes: 48884 (Sheridan); 48885 (Sidney); 48888 (Stanton)
- Area code: 989
- FIPS code: 26-117-73840
- GNIS feature ID: 1627081
- Website: sidneymi.gov

Sidney Township is a civil township of Montcalm County in the U.S. state of Michigan. The population was 2,538 at the 2020 census.

== Geography ==
The township is in southwestern Montcalm County and is bordered to the northeast by the city of Stanton, the county seat. Part of the village of Sheridan occupies the southeast corner of the township. State highway M-66 runs along the eastern border of the township, connecting Stanton and Sheridan.

According to the U.S. Census Bureau, Sidney Township has a total area of 35.0 square miles (91 km^{2}), of which 33.9 square miles (88 km^{2}) are land and 1.1 square miles (2.8 km^{2}), or 3.12%, are water. The western and southern parts of the township are drained by Dickerson Creek and its tributaries, part of the Flat River watershed flowing south to the Grand River. The northern and eastern parts of the township are drained by tributaries of Fish Creek, which flows east to the Maple River, another tributary of the Grand.

=== Communities ===
- Sidney is an unincorporated community near the center of the township at 43°15′00″N 85°07′59″W at the intersection of Derby and Sidney roads. In 1854, Phineas Swift, a New Yorker, became the first permanent settler. A post office was established on September 29, 1862, with Joshua V. Noah as the first postmaster. The community was named for the township, which in turn was named for Sidney, Ohio, the home of some of its early settlers. The Sidney post office, with ZIP code 48885, serves the central part of the township, as well as part of Montcalm Township to the west.
- The village of Sheridan is at the southeast corner of the township and incorporates some land in the township. The Sheridan post office, with ZIP code 48884, serves the southern part of Sidney Township.
- The city of Stanton is at the northeast corner of the township and incorporates some land formerly within the township. The Stanton post office, with ZIP code 48888, serves the northern part of Sidney Township.

== Demographics ==
Historical population
Census	Pop.	Note	%±
1860	172		—
1870	611		255.2%
1880	2,224		264.0%
1890	1,514		−31.9%
1900	1,378		−9.0%
1910	1,414		2.6%
1920	1,248		−11.7%
1930	1,031		−17.4%
1940	985		−4.5%
1950	1,118		13.5%
1960	1,284		14.8%
1970	1,504		17.1%
1980	2,053		36.5%
1990	2,375		15.7%
2000	2,563		7.9%
2010	2,574		0.4%
2020	2,538		−1.4%
U.S. Decennial Census

As of the census of 2000, there were 2,563 people, 966 households, and 738 families residing in the township. The population density was 75.2 inhabitants per square mile (29.0/km^{2}). There were 1,115 housing units at an average density of 32.7 per square mile (12.6/km^{2}). The racial makeup of the township was 97.50% White, 0.43% African American, 0.74% Native American, 0.16% Asian, 0.43% from other races, and 0.74% from two or more races. Hispanic or Latino of any race were 0.90% of the population.

There were 966 households, out of which 33.3% had children under the age of 18 living with them, 63.3% were married couples living together, 9.1% had a female householder with no husband present, and 23.5% were non-families. 18.7% of all households were made up of individuals, and 8.1% had someone living alone who was 65 years of age or older. The average household size was 2.65 and the average family size was 3.00.

In the township the population was spread out, with 26.4% under the age of 18, 7.5% from 18 to 24, 29.4% from 25 to 44, 24.7% from 45 to 64, and 12.1% who were 65 years of age or older. The median age was 38 years. For every 100 females, there were 100.2 males. For every 100 females age 18 and over, there were 98.8 males.

The median income for a household in the township was $40,682, and the median income for a family was $44,762. Males had a median income of $31,952 versus $27,069 for females. The per capita income for the township was $17,045. About 8.3% of families and 8.6% of the population were below the poverty line, including 9.2% of those under age 18 and 11.6% of those age 65 or over.
