= Ford River, Michigan =

- Unincorporated community
- Location within the state of Michigan
- Coordinates: 45°40′46″N 87°08′22″W
- Country: United States
- State: Michigan
- County: Delta
- Township: Ford River
- Elevation: 584 ft (178 m)
- Time zone: UTC-5 (Eastern (EST))
  - Summer (DST): UTC-4 (EDT)
- ZIP code(s): 49829
- Area code: 906
- GNIS feature ID: 626237

Ford River is an unincorporated community in Delta County, in the U.S. state of Michigan.

== History ==
A post office was established at Ford River in 1860, and was discontinued in 1872. The community took its name from the Ford River.
