= Edmore, Michigan =

- Village
- Location of Edmore in Montcalm County and the state of Michigan
- Coordinates: 43°24′26″N 85°02′12″W
- Country: United States
- State: Michigan
- County: Montcalm
- Township: Home

Area
  - Total: 1.52 sq mi (3.94 km^{2})
  - Land: 1.52 sq mi (3.94 km^{2})
  - Water: 0 sq mi (0.00 km^{2})
- Elevation: 968 ft (295 m)

Population (2020)
  - Total: 1,210
  - Density: 795.0/sq mi (306.94/km^{2})
- Time zone: UTC-5 (Eastern (EST))
  - Summer (DST): UTC-4 (EDT)
- ZIP code: 48829
- Area code: 989
- FIPS code: 26-25000
- GNIS feature ID: 2398789
- Website: www.edmore.com

Edmore is a village in Montcalm County of the U.S. state of Michigan. The population was 1,210 at the 2020 census.

== History ==
Edmore was founded and platted by Edwin B. Moore, a real estate man, in 1878, and named with a contraction of his name. A post office was established on July 22, 1878, with Abraham West as the first postmaster. Its station on the Detroit, Lansing and Northern Railroad was called "Edmore Junction". It was incorporated as a village in 1879 with Moore as its first president.

The Edmore post office, with ZIP code 48829, serves most of Home Township as well as portions of Belvidere Township to the west, Douglass Township to the southwest, Day Township to the south, Ferris Township to the southeast, and Rolland Township to the north in Isabella County.

Edmore is close to the site of the finds of the forged Scotford-Soper-Savage relics.

The Edmore meteorite was discovered on a nearby farm in 2018. It had reportedly fallen to earth in the 1930s on another farm and had been used as a doorstop since then.

== Geography ==
Edmore is in northeastern Montcalm County, in the south-central part of Home Township. It is 10 miles (16 km) by road north-northeast of Stanton, the county seat. According to the U.S. Census Bureau, the village has a total area of 1.52 square miles (3.94 km^{2}), all land.

=== Highways ===
- M-46 is a highway that nearly bisects the Lower Peninsula of Michigan latitudinally. The highway leads east 21 miles (34 km) to St. Louis and west 12 miles (19 km) to Lakeview.

== Demographics ==
Historical population
Census	Pop.	Note	%±
1880	704		—
1890	735		4.4%
1900	642		−12.7%
1910	752		17.1%
1920	772		2.7%
1930	897		16.2%
1940	825		−8.0%
1950	971		17.7%
1960	1,234		27.1%
1970	1,149		−6.9%
1980	1,176		2.3%
1990	1,126		−4.3%
2000	1,244		10.5%
2010	1,201		−3.5%
2020	1,210		0.7%
U.S. Decennial Census

=== 2010 census ===
As of the census of 2010, there were 1,201 people, 512 households, and 324 families residing in the village. The population density was 795.4 inhabitants per square mile (307.1/km^{2}). There were 565 housing units at an average density of 374.2 per square mile (144.5/km^{2}). The racial makeup of the village was 94.9% White, 0.5% African American, 0.5% Native American, 0.2% Asian, 0.9% from other races, and 3.0% from two or more races. Hispanic or Latino of any race were 4.1% of the population.

There were 512 households, of which 32.0% had children under the age of 18 living with them, 37.9% were married couples living together, 18.8% had a female householder with no husband present, 6.6% had a male householder with no wife present, and 36.7% were non-families. 31.8% of all households were made up of individuals, and 14% had someone living alone who was 65 years of age or older. The average household size was 2.31 and the average family size was 2.85.

The median age in the village was 38.8 years. 24.6% of residents were under the age of 18; 10.1% were between the ages of 18 and 24; 23.6% were from 25 to 44; 25.1% were from 45 to 64; and 16.6% were 65 years of age or older. The gender makeup of the village was 46.0% male and 54.0% female.

=== 2000 census ===
As of the census of 2000, there were 1,244 people, 491 households, and 334 families residing in the village. The population density was 875.7 inhabitants per square mile (338.1/km^{2}). There were 524 housing units at an average density of 368.8 per square mile (142.4/km^{2}). The racial makeup of the village was 95.50% White, 0.40% African American, 0.80% Native American, 0.56% from other races, and 2.73% from two or more races. Hispanic or Latino of any race were 2.97% of the population.

There were 491 households, out of which 37.3% had children under the age of 18 living with them, 48.1% were married couples living together, 13.6% had a female householder with no husband present, and 31.8% were non-families. 29.3% of all households were made up of individuals, and 16.1% had someone living alone who was 65 years of age or older. The average household size was 2.49 and the average family size was 3.05.

In the village, the population was spread out, with 29.7% under the age of 18, 9.5% from 18 to 24, 25.7% from 25 to 44, 17.2% from 45 to 64, and 17.9% who were 65 years of age or older. The median age was 34 years. For every 100 females, there were 87.1 males. For every 100 females age 18 and over, there were 81.2 males.

The median income for a household in the village was $24,926, and the median income for a family was $35,391. Males had a median income of $30,156 versus $22,045 for females. The per capita income for the village was $12,853. About 16.8% of families and 20.7% of the population were below the poverty line, including 26.4% of those under age 18 and 11.8% of those age 65 or over.
