= Belvidere Township, Michigan =

- Township
- Location within Michigan Location within the United States
- Coordinates: 43°25′46″N 85°8′54″W
- Country: United States
- State: Michigan
- County: Montcalm
- Organized: March 7, 1867

Area
  - Total: 36.0 sq mi (93 km^{2})
  - Land: 34.6 sq mi (90 km^{2})
  - Water: 1.4 sq mi (3.6 km^{2})
- Elevation: 915 ft (279 m)

Population (2020)
  - Total: 2,135
  - Density: 61.7/sq mi (23.8/km^{2})
- Time zone: UTC-5 (Eastern (EST))
  - Summer (DST): UTC-4 (EDT)
- ZIP codes: 48886 (Six Lakes); 48829 (Edmore); 48850 (Lakeview)
- FIPS code: 26-117-07200
- GNIS feature ID: 1625911
- Website: belvideretownshipmi.gov

Belvidere Township is a civil township of Montcalm County in the U.S. state of Michigan. As of the 2020 census, the township population was 2,135.

== Geography ==
The township is along the northern edge of Montcalm County, bordered to the north by Mecosta County and at the town's northeast corner by Isabella County. The center of the township at Six Lakes is 12 miles (19 km) north of Stanton, the county seat, and 22 miles (35 km) north-northeast of Greenville.

According to the U.S. Census Bureau, the township has a total area of 36.0 square miles (93 km^{2}), of which 34.6 square miles (90 km^{2}) are land and 1.4 square miles (3.6 km^{2}), or 3.82%, are water. Several natural lakes are in the township, include five of the chain of Six Lakes, which run west to east across the north part of the township. The Flat River flows out of First Lake within the community of Six Lakes in the center of the township; the river is a south-flowing tributary of the Grand River.

== Communities ==
- Six Lakes is an unincorporated community near the center of the township at 43°25′30″N 85°09′00″W on highway M-46 where M-66 branches to the north. A settlement named "Sumnerville" laid out by L. C. Sumner in 1873 and located approximately one-and-a-half-mile (2.4 km) east of Six Lakes was the first village platted in the township. The settlement saw some growth, but when the Chicago, Saginaw and Canada Railroad (which became part of the Pere Marquette Railway and then the Chesapeake and Ohio Railway) was built and a station was established nearer to the Flat River, Sumner subsequently sold his holdings and moved to Edmore. Hiram Clark and Dr. J. B. Daniels purchased 70 acres (280,000 m^{2}) of land around the rail station, then platted "Six Lakes" on May 13, 1876. A post office was established on December 20, 1878. The Six Lakes post office with ZIP code 48886 serves most of Belvidere Township as well as smaller portions of Cato Township to the west, Douglass Township to the south and Millbrook Township to the north in Mecosta County.

== Demographics ==
Historical population
Census	Pop.	Note	%±
1870	54		—
1880	525		872.2%
1890	1,027		95.6%
1900	1,201		16.9%
1910	1,297		8.0%
1920	1,227		−5.4%
1930	969		−21.0%
1940	1,076		11.0%
1950	1,093		1.6%
1960	1,411		29.1%
1970	1,345		−4.7%
1980	1,955		45.4%
1990	2,134		9.2%
2000	2,438		14.2%
2010	2,209		−9.4%
2020	2,135		−3.3%
U.S. Decennial Census

As of the census of 2000, there were 2,438 people, 952 households, and 699 families residing in the township. The population density was 70.0 inhabitants per square mile (27.0/km^{2}). There were 1,324 housing units at an average density of 38.0 per square mile (14.7/km^{2}). The racial makeup of the township was 95.94% White, 0.37% African American, 1.97% Native American, 0.12% Asian, 0.25% from other races, and 1.35% from two or more races. Hispanic or Latino of any race were 1.35% of the population.

There were 952 households, out of which 32.1% had children under the age of 18 living with them, 58.9% were married couples living together, 8.5% had a female householder with no husband present, and 26.5% were non-families. 21.7% of all households were made up of individuals, and 9.8% had someone living alone who was 65 years of age or older. The average household size was 2.55 and the average family size was 2.93.

In the township, 25.8% of the population was under the age of 18, 7.6% was from 18 to 24, 25.9% from 25 to 44, 24.7% from 45 to 64, and 16.1% was 65 years of age or older. The median age was 38 years. For every 100 females, there were 96.9 males. For every 100 females age 18 and over, there were 96.5 males.

The median income for a household in the township was $33,477, and the median income for a family was $37,717. Males had a median income of $33,750 versus $20,893 for females. The per capita income for the township was $15,920. About 7.4% of families and 10.6% of the population were below the poverty line, including 14.1% of those under age 18 and 10.2% of those age 65 or over.
