= Day Township, Michigan =

- Township
- Location within Michigan Location within the United States
- Coordinates: 43°20′35″N 85°2′3″W
- Country: United States
- State: Michigan
- County: Montcalm

Area
  - Total: 35.4 sq mi (92 km^{2})
  - Land: 35.3 sq mi (91 km^{2})
  - Water: 0.1 sq mi (0.26 km^{2})
- Elevation: 961 ft (293 m)

Population (2020)
  - Total: 1,141
  - Density: 32.3/sq mi (12.5/km^{2})
- Time zone: UTC-5 (Eastern (EST))
  - Summer (DST): UTC-4 (EDT)
- ZIP codes: 48829 (Edmore); 48852 (McBrides); 48888 (Stanton)
- FIPS code: 26-117-19920
- GNIS feature ID: 1626161
- Website: www.daytownship.com

Day Township is a civil township of Montcalm County in the U.S. state of Michigan. As of the 2020 census, the township population was 1,141.

The Mid Michigan Motorplex, formerly known as the Central Michigan Dragway, is located within the township.

== Communities ==
- McBride is a village in the township, near the junction of county road 530 (McBrides Road) and county road 571 (Wyman Road). The post office for the village, with ZIP code 48852, is named "McBrides" and provides P.O. box service for the village.
- Westville is an unincorporated community on the western boundary of the township at 43°21′28″N 85°05′01″W, about 2 miles (3 km) west of McBride and about 4 miles (6 km) north of Stanton. A post office was established on May 2, 1872, with Eli M. Mallet as the first postmaster. The community was platted and recorded as "Westville" by Daniel West. The post office continued to operate until October 31, 1907.
- The city of Stanton is situated at the southwest corner of the township and incorporates most of section 31. The Stanton post office, with ZIP code 48888, also serves most of southern Day Township.

== Geography ==
Day Township is in northeastern Montcalm County, bordered to the southwest by the city of Stanton, the county seat. According to the U.S. Census Bureau, the township has a total area of 35.4 square miles (92 km^{2}), of which 35.3 square miles (91 km^{2}) are land and 0.1 square miles (0.3 km^{2}), or 0.24%, are water. The township is drained to the west by tributaries of the Flat River and to the east by tributaries of Fish Creek, which passes through the southeast part of the township. Both waterways are part of the Grand River watershed leading west to Lake Michigan.

== Demographics ==
Historical population
Census	Pop.	Note	%±
1870	510		—
1880	3,220		531.4%
1890	1,787		−44.5%
1900	1,438		−19.5%
1910	1,420		−1.3%
1920	1,331		−6.3%
1930	1,212		−8.9%
1940	1,205		−0.6%
1950	1,120		−7.1%
1960	1,149		2.6%
1970	1,180		2.7%
1980	1,234		4.6%
1990	1,196		−3.1%
2000	1,282		7.2%
2010	1,172		−8.6%
2020	1,141		−2.6%
U.S. Decennial Census

As of the census of 2000, there were 1,282 people, 461 households, and 366 families residing in the township. The population density was 36.4 inhabitants per square mile (14.1/km^{2}). There were 496 housing units at an average density of 14.1 per square mile (5.4/km^{2}). The racial makeup of the township was 96.49% White, 0.23% African American, 0.62% Native American, 0.16% Asian, 0.08% Pacific Islander, 0.39% from other races, and 2.03% from two or more races. Hispanic or Latino of any race were 2.65% of the population.

There were 461 households, out of which 34.1% had children under the age of 18 living with them, 67.2% were married couples living together, 7.6% had a female householder with no husband present, and 20.6% were non-families. 16.7% of all households were made up of individuals, and 8.9% had someone living alone who was 65 years of age or older. The average household size was 2.78 and the average family size was 3.08.

In the township the population was spread out, with 27.6% under the age of 18, 8.6% from 18 to 24, 27.3% from 25 to 44, 23.6% from 45 to 64, and 12.9% who were 65 years of age or older. The median age was 36 years. For every 100 females, there were 101.6 males. For every 100 females age 18 and over, there were 95.0 males.

The median income for a household in the township was $35,500, and the median income for a family was $42,566. Males had a median income of $30,167 versus $19,348 for females. The per capita income for the township was $16,724. About 8.1% of families and 13.3% of the population were below the poverty line, including 22.5% of those under age 18 and 7.4% of those age 65 or over.
