= Douglass Township, Michigan =

- Township
- Location within Michigan Location within the United States
- Coordinates: 43°20′27″N 85°9′20″W
- Country: United States
- State: Michigan
- County: Montcalm

Area
  - Total: 35.6 sq mi (92 km^{2})
  - Land: 34.7 sq mi (90 km^{2})
  - Water: 0.9 sq mi (2.3 km^{2})
- Elevation: 909 ft (277 m)

Population (2020)
  - Total: 2,239
  - Density: 64.5/sq mi (24.9/km^{2})
- Time zone: UTC-5 (Eastern (EST))
  - Summer (DST): UTC-4 (EDT)
- ZIP Codes: 48888 (Stanton); 48850 (Lakeview); 48829 (Edmore); 48886 (Six Lakes)
- FIPS code: 26-117-22760
- GNIS feature ID: 1626187
- Website: www.douglasstwp.org

Douglass Township is a civil township of Montcalm County in the U.S. state of Michigan. The population was 2,239 at the 2020 census.

== Communities ==
- Entrican is a small unincorporated community on the Flat River at 43°21′01″N 85°09′13″W.

== Geography ==
The township is in north-central Montcalm County and is bordered to the southeast by the city of Stanton, the county seat. According to the U.S. Census Bureau, the township has a total area of 35.6 square miles (92 km^{2}), of which 34.7 square miles (90 km^{2}) are land and 0.9 square miles (2.3 km^{2}), or 2.57%, are water. Clifford Lake and Dickerson Lake are in the southwest part of the township. The township is drained by the Flat River, a south-flowing tributary of the Grand River.

== Demographics ==
Historical population
Census	Pop.	Note	%±
1870	215		—
1880	1,000		365.1%
1890	968		−3.2%
1900	1,104		14.0%
1910	1,132		2.5%
1920	1,042		−8.0%
1930	831		−20.2%
1940	801		−3.6%
1950	806		0.6%
1960	884		9.7%
1970	1,118		26.5%
1980	1,787		59.8%
1990	1,944		8.8%
2000	2,377		22.3%
2010	2,180		−8.3%
2020	2,239		2.7%
U.S. Decennial Census

As of the census of 2000, there were 2,377 people, 891 households, and 669 families residing in the township. The population density was 68.0 inhabitants per square mile (26.3/km^{2}). There were 1,116 housing units at an average density of 31.9 per square mile (12.3/km^{2}). The racial makeup of the township was 98.06% White, 0.08% African American, 0.17% Native American, 0.21% Asian, 0.46% from other races, and 1.01% from two or more races. Hispanic or Latino of any race were 2.31% of the population.

There were 891 households, out of which 34.5% had children under the age of 18 living with them, 63.6% were married couples living together, 6.8% had a female householder with no husband present, and 24.9% were non-families. 19.5% of all households were made up of individuals, and 9.4% had someone living alone who was 65 years of age or older. The average household size was 2.66 and the average family size was 3.04.

In the township the population was spread out, with 26.9% under the age of 18, 7.3% from 18 to 24, 27.1% from 25 to 44, 25.7% from 45 to 64, and 13.0% who were 65 years of age or older. The median age was 37 years. For every 100 females, there were 98.2 males. For every 100 females age 18 and over, there were 101.3 males.

The median income for a household in the township was $44,309, and the median income for a family was $47,560. Males had a median income of $32,426 versus $24,375 for females. The per capita income for the township was $17,892. About 2.4% of families and 4.6% of the population were below the poverty line, including 5.0% of those under age 18 and 6.6% of those age 65 or over.
