= Lakeview, Michigan =

- Village
- Location within Montcalm County and the state of Michigan
- Coordinates: 43°26′36″N 85°16′26″W
- Country: United States
- State: Michigan
- County: Montcalm
- Township: Cato
- Incorporated: 1881

Area
  - Total: 1.83 sq mi (4.74 km^{2})
  - Land: 1.50 sq mi (3.88 km^{2})
  - Water: 0.33 sq mi (0.86 km^{2})
- Elevation: 948 ft (289 m)

Population (2020)
  - Total: 1,024
  - Density: 683.8/sq mi (264.03/km^{2})
- Time zone: UTC-5 (Eastern (EST))
  - Summer (DST): UTC-4 (EDT)
- ZIP code: 48850
- Area code: 989
- FIPS code: 26-45240
- GNIS feature ID: 2398389
- Website: villageoflakeview.org

Lakeview is a village in Cato Township in Montcalm County of the U.S. state of Michigan. The population was 1,024 at the 2020 census.

== History ==
Lakeview was first settled in 1858 and platted in 1867 by Albert S. French, a settler from New York. It had been a Native American camp site. French named it for its location on the west side of Tamarack Lake. A post office was established on October 7, 1867, with Hiram S. Barton as its first postmaster. It was a station on the Chicago, Saginaw and Canada Railroad in 1879.

== Geography ==
Lakeview is in northern Montcalm County, in the north-central part of Cato Township. It sits on the west side of Tamarack Lake, 19 miles (31 km) north of Greenville. According to the U.S. Census Bureau, the village has a total area of 1.83 square miles (4.74 km^{2}), of which 1.50 square miles (3.88 km^{2}) are land and 0.33 square miles (0.85 km^{2}), or 18.2%, are water. Tamarack Lake drains to the north, outside the village limits, to Tamarack Creek, which flows west past the village toward the Little Muskegon River and ultimately to Lake Michigan.

State highway M-46 runs along the southern edge of the village, leading east 11 miles (18 km) to Edmore and west 12 miles (19 km) to U.S. Route 131 near Howard City. M-91 runs south from M-46 at the Lakeview border to Greenville.

The Lakeview post office, with ZIP code 48850, serves most of Cato Township as well as part of Belvidere Township to the east, Douglass Township to the southeast, Pine Township to the south, and Winfield Township to the west. It also serves a large portion of Hinton Township to the north and Millbrook Township to the northeast in Mecosta County.

== Demographics ==
Historical population
Census	Pop.	Note	%±
1880	599		—
1890	1,024		71.0%
1900	935		−8.7%
1910	954		2.0%
1920	886		−7.1%
1930	850		−4.1%
1940	824		−3.1%
1950	975		18.3%
1960	1,126		15.5%
1970	1,118		−0.7%
1980	1,139		1.9%
1990	1,108		−2.7%
2000	1,112		0.4%
2010	1,007		−9.4%
2020	1,024		1.7%
U.S. Decennial Census

=== 2010 census ===
As of the census of 2010, there were 1,007 people, 438 households, and 259 families living in the village. The population density was 662.5 inhabitants per square mile (255.8/km^{2}). There were 499 housing units at an average density of 328.3 per square mile (126.8/km^{2}). The racial makeup of the village was 96.3% White, 0.4% African American, 0.4% Native American, 0.6% Asian, 0.2% Pacific Islander, 0.2% from other races, and 1.9% from two or more races. Hispanic or Latino of any race were 2.6% of the population.

There were 438 households, of which 27.9% had children under the age of 18 living with them, 39.3% were married couples living together, 16.7% had a female householder with no husband present, 3.2% had a male householder with no wife present, and 40.9% were non-families. 35.4% of all households were made up of individuals, and 16.7% had someone living alone who was 65 years of age or older. The average household size was 2.23 and the average family size was 2.86.

The median age in the village was 41.3 years. 23.1% of residents were under the age of 18; 9% were between the ages of 18 and 24; 21.8% were from 25 to 44; 24.9% were from 45 to 64; and 21.5% were 65 years of age or older. The gender makeup of the village was 46.2% male and 53.8% female.

=== 2000 census ===
As of the census of 2000, there were 1,112 people, 396 households, and 287 families living in the village. The population density was 707.2 inhabitants per square mile (273.1/km^{2}). There were 452 housing units at an average density of 287.4 per square mile (111.0/km^{2}). The racial makeup of the village was 97.57% White, 0.09% African American, 0.45% Native American, 0.27% Asian, 0.72% from other races, and 0.90% from two or more races. Hispanic or Latino of any race were 3.06% of the population.

There were 396 households, out of which 36.1% had children under the age of 18 living with them, 53.0% were married couples living together, 15.7% had a female householder with no husband present, and 27.3% were non-families. 24.0% of all households were made up of individuals, and 15.7% had someone living alone who was 65 years of age or older. The average household size was 2.67 and the average family size was 3.08.

In the village, the population was spread out, with 29.0% under the age of 18, 8.2% from 18 to 24, 26.5% from 25 to 44, 16.2% from 45 to 64, and 20.1% who were 65 years of age or older. The median age was 36 years. For every 100 females, there were 81.4 males. For every 100 females age 18 and over, there were 79.1 males.

The median income for a household in the village was $33,611, and the median income for a family was $38,594. Males had a median income of $28,681 versus $22,955 for females. The per capita income for the village was $14,154. About 9.8% of families and 9.9% of the population were below the poverty line, including 12.8% of those under age 18 and 8.8% of those age 65 or over.

== Climate ==
This climatic region is typified by large seasonal temperature differences, with warm to hot (and often humid) summers and cold (sometimes severely cold) winters. According to the Köppen Climate Classification system, Lakeview has a humid continental climate, abbreviated "Dfb" on climate maps.
