= Stanton, Michigan =

- City
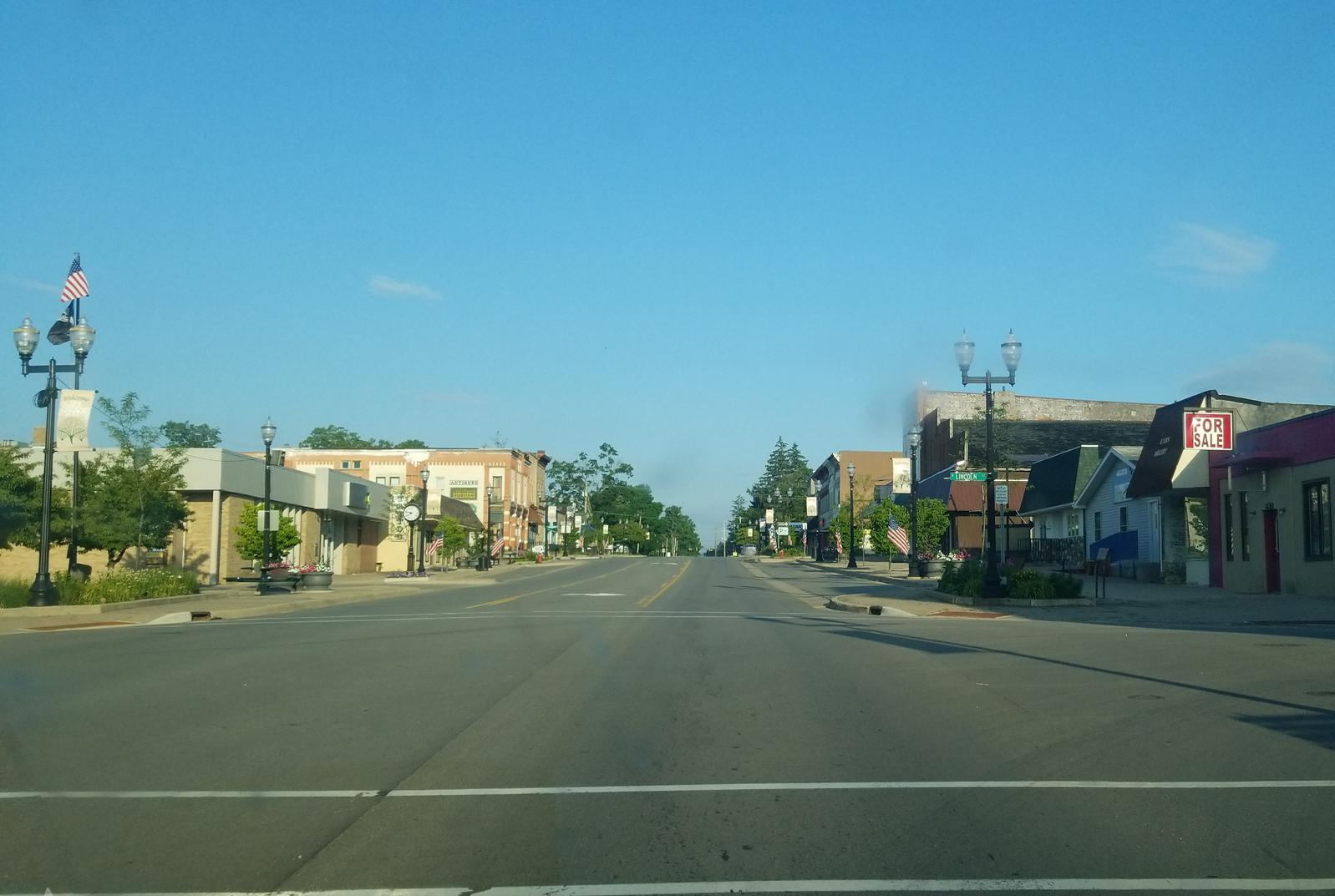
- East Main Street in Stanton

- Location within Montcalm County and the state of Michigan
- Coordinates: 43°17′34″N 85°04′44″W
- Country: United States
- State: Michigan
- County: Montcalm
- Founded: 1860
- Incorporated: 1869 (village); 1881 (city)

Government
  - Mayor: Bill Ferguson

Area
  - Total: 2.15 sq mi (5.57 km^{2})
  - Land: 2.15 sq mi (5.56 km^{2})
  - Water: 0.0039 sq mi (0.01 km^{2})
- Elevation: 902 ft (275 m)

Population (2020)
  - Total: 1,348
  - Density: 628.1/sq mi (242.51/km^{2})
- Time zone: UTC-5 (Eastern (EST))
  - Summer (DST): UTC-4 (EDT)
- ZIP code: 48888
- Area code: 989
- FIPS code: 26-76220
- GNIS feature ID: 1627122
- Website: www.stantononline.com

Stanton is a city in the U.S. state of Michigan. The population was 1,348 at the 2020 census. It is the county seat of Montcalm County.

== History ==
Stanton was organized in 1860 when the people of Montcalm County voted to move the county seat here from Greenville, which had been the original county seat since 1840. At that time, the County Board purchased 40 acres (160,000 m^{2}) from Fred Hall of Ionia and named the location "Fred" in his honor. The family of Levi Camburn was the first to settle here, and he became its first postmaster on March 10, 1862. The city was renamed for U.S. Secretary of War Edwin M. Stanton in 1863. Stanton was platted in 1865, incorporated as a village in 1869, and as a city in 1881. The Hotel Montcalm was established in 1863.

== Geography ==
Stanton is in central Montcalm County, 17 miles (27 km) by road northeast of Greenville, the largest city in the county. Stanton is located at the corners of four townships, incorporating land from each: Day Township to the northeast, Evergreen Township to the southeast, Sidney Township to the southwest, and Douglass Township to the northwest. According to the U.S. Census Bureau, the city has a total area of 2.15 square miles (5.57 km^{2}), all land.

The Stanton post office, with ZIP code 48888, also serves portions of the four surrounding townships list above, as well as areas of Ferris Township to the east of Day, Belvidere Township to the north of Douglass, and Pine Township to the west of Douglass.

== Transportation ==
- M-66 passes through the city as South Sheridan Road, Main Street, and North State Street. The highway leads south 21 miles (34 km) to Ionia and north 12 miles (19 km) to Six Lakes.

== Demographics ==
Historical population
Census	Pop.	Note	%±
1870	600		—
1880	1,760		193.3%
1890	1,352		−23.2%
1900	1,234		−8.7%
1910	1,012		−18.0%
1920	862		−14.8%
1930	955		10.8%
1940	908		−4.9%
1950	1,123		23.7%
1960	1,139		1.4%
1970	1,089		−4.4%
1980	1,315		20.8%
1990	1,504		14.4%
2000	1,504		0.0%
2010	1,417		−5.8%
2020	1,348		−4.9%
U.S. Decennial Census

=== 2020 census ===
As of the census of 2020, there were 1,348 people, 486 households, and 267 families living in the city. The population density was 628.1 inhabitants per square mile (242.51/km^{2}). There were 486 occupied housing units at an average density of 226.05 per square mile (87.25/km^{2}). The racial makeup of the city was 93.62% White, 0.67 % African American, 0.30% Asian, 1.33% from other races, and 4.08% from two or more races.

There were 486 households with an average household size of 2.42. Of 486 households 26.7% had children under the age of 18 living with them, 36.62% were married couples living together, 17.9% had a female householder with no husband present, 11.93% had a male householder with no wife present. 15.0% had someone living alone who was 65 years of age or older. The average household size was 2.42 and the average family size was 3.29.

The median age in the city was 44.6 years. 21.9% of residents were under the age of 18; 4.1% were between the ages of 18 and 24; 24.70% were from 25 to 44; 35.06% were from 45 to 64; and 14.2% were 65 years of age or older. The gender makeup of the city was 55.34% male and 44.67% female.

=== 2010 census ===
As of the census of 2010, there were 1,417 people, 508 households, and 315 families living in the city. The population density was 659.1 inhabitants per square mile (254.5/km^{2}). There were 579 housing units at an average density of 269.3 per square mile (104.0/km^{2}). The racial makeup of the city was 93.8% White, 1.8% African American, 0.7% Native American, 0.2% Asian, 1.8% from other races, and 1.7% from two or more races. Hispanic or Latino of any race were 5.9% of the population.

There were 508 households, of which 32.7% had children under the age of 18 living with them, 39.6% were married couples living together, 17.9% had a female householder with no husband present, 4.5% had a male householder with no wife present, and 38.0% were non-families. 33.3% of all households were made up of individuals, and 16.3% had someone living alone who was 65 years of age or older. The average household size was 2.42 and the average family size was 3.01.

The median age in the city was 33.8 years. 23.9% of residents were under the age of 18; 11.6% were between the ages of 18 and 24; 29.5% were from 25 to 44; 21.3% were from 45 to 64; and 13.8% were 65 years of age or older. The gender makeup of the city was 50.6% male and 49.4% female.

=== 2000 census ===
As of the census of 2000, there were 1,504 people, 555 households, and 362 families living in the city. The population density was 701.6 inhabitants per square mile (270.9/km^{2}). There were 609 housing units at an average density of 284.1 per square mile (109.7/km^{2}). The racial makeup of the city was 95.94% White, 0.20% African American, 0.40% Native American, 0.27% Asian, 1.13% from other races, and 2.06% from two or more races. Hispanic or Latino of any race were 4.85% of the population. 46.9% of the town was Finnish, the largest percentage of any populated place in the United States.

There were 555 households, out of which 37.3% had children under the age of 18 living with them, 42.7% were married couples living together, 17.1% had a female householder with no husband present, and 34.6% were non-families. 29.7% of all households were made up of individuals, and 14.6% had someone living alone who was 65 years of age or older. The average household size was 2.54 and the average family size was 3.13.

In the city, the population was spread out, with 29.9% under the age of 18, 9.0% from 18 to 24, 31.9% from 25 to 44, 16.9% from 45 to 64, and 12.2% who were 65 years of age or older. The median age was 32 years. For every 100 females, there were 96.1 males. For every 100 females age 18 and over, there were 92.3 males.

The median income for a household in the city was $29,286, and the median income for a family was $39,688. Males had a median income of $32,569 versus $22,500 for females. The per capita income for the city was $13,901. About 17.8% of families and 21.7% of the population were below the poverty line, including 30.3% of those under age 18 and 12.2% of those age 65 or over.

== Points of interest ==
- Mid Michigan Motorplex
- Corporate Home to Casair, Inc.
