= Cato =

Cato typically refers to either Cato the Elder or Cato the Younger, both of the Porcii Catones family of Rome.

It may also refer to:

== People ==
=== Ancient Romans ===
- Porcii Catones, a plebeian family at Ancient Rome
- Cato the Elder (Cato Maior) or "the Censor" (Marcus Porcius Cato 234–149 BC), Roman statesman
  - Marcus Porcius Cato Licinianus, son of Cato the Elder by his first wife Licinia, jurist
    - Marcus Porcius Cato, son of Cato Licinianus, consul 118 BC, died in Africa in the same year
    - Gaius Porcius Cato (consul 114 BC), son of Cato Licinianus, consul 114 BC
  - Marcus Porcius Cato Salonianus, son of Cato the Elder by his second wife Salonia, (born 154 BC, when his father had completed his eightieth year)
    - Marcus Porcius Cato, son of Cato Salonianus and father of Cato the Younger
      - Cato the Younger (Cato Minor) "Cato of Utica" (Marcus Porcius Catō Uticēnsis 95–46 BC), politician and statesman in the late Roman Republic
        - Marcus Porcius Cato (son of Cato the Younger), fell at the Battle of Philippi, 42 BC
    - Lucius Porcius Cato, son of Cato Salonianus, consul 89 BC, killed during the Social War (91–87 BC)
- Dionysius Cato, 3rd or 4th century AD author of Distichs of Cato

=== Others ===
- Cato (surname)
- Cato (given name)
- Jemmy, also known as "Cato", the leader of the Stono Rebellion, a 1739 slave revolt in South Carolina

== Pseudonym ==
- Cato, the pseudonym used in the 1720s by the authors of Cato's Letters, i.e. John Trenchard and Thomas Gordon
- Cato the anti-Federalist, pseudonym for an American author of the Anti-Federalist Papers in the late 1780s, probably the politician George Clinton
- Cato, the pseudonym for the authors of the 1940s polemic Guilty Men

== Fictional characters ==
- Cato Fong, Inspector Clouseau's manservant in the Pink Panther movies
- Cato, a tribute in The Hunger Games
- Quintus Licinius Cato, in Simon Scarrow’s Eagles of the Empire series
- Cato Weeksbooth, in the Terra Ignota series by Ada Palmer

== Places ==
=== Australia ===
- Cato Bank, the bank that contains the Cato Reef
- Cato Island, an island in the Cato Reef
- Cato Reef, a reef in the Coral Sea
- Cato Trough, a trough in the Coral Sea

=== United States ===
- Cato, Indiana, an unincorporated community
- Cato, Kansas, an unincorporated community
- Cato Township, Michigan
- Cato, Missouri, an unincorporated community
- Cato (town), New York
- Cato (village), New York
- Cato, Pennsylvania, an unincorporated community
- Cato, Tennessee, an unincorporated community in Trousdale County
- Cato, Wisconsin, a town
- Cato (community), Wisconsin, an unincorporated community

== Literature ==
- Distichs of Cato, or simply Cato, a Latin collection of proverbial wisdom and morality by Dionysius Cato from the 3rd or 4th century AD
- Cato, a Tragedy, an 18th-century drama by Joseph Addison

== Ships ==
- HMS Cato, three Royal Navy vessels
- Cato (1800 ship), an English merchant ship sunk on the Great Barrier Reef in 1803
- Cato (1807 ship), a merchant ship which foundered in 1841

== Technology ==
- CATO, an acronym used in rocketry, for Catastrophe At Take Off
- CATO, an acronym for Catapult Assisted take-off
- Corazón Artificial Total Ortotópico (Spanish for Orthotopic Total Artificial Heart) invented by Juan Giambruno

== Other uses ==
- Cato Corporation, an American fashion retailer
- Cato Networks, an Israeli network security company
- Cato Institute, an American libertarian think tank
- Cato, a South Devon Railway Eagle class 4-4-0ST steam locomotive

== See also ==
- Catto (disambiguation)
- Kato (disambiguation)
