= Kaito (disambiguation) =

Kaito is a Japanese surname and a male given name.

Kaito may also refer to:

== People ==
- Baruto Kaito (born 1984), Estonian professional sumo wrestler and politician
- Kaito Takahashi (born 1999), Japanese singer, actor, and manga artist
- Kaito Yamamoto (born 1985), Japanese football player

== Characters ==
- Kaito Kumon, Kamen Rider Baron in Kamen Rider Gaim
- Kaito Takahaya, a Japanese naval commander in The Last Ship
- Kaito Momota, a character in Danganronpa V3: Killing Harmony

== Other uses ==
- Phantom thief (怪盗; Kaitō), or "gentleman thief", a stock character in Japanese fiction
- KaitO, an English indie rock band
- Kaito (software), a voice synth developed by Yamaha Corporation for the Vocaloid engine
- Kaito, sometimes Kai-to, a type of small ferry in Hong Kong

== See also ==
- Cato (disambiguation)
- Kato (disambiguation)
