= Kato =

Kato or Katō may refer to:

== Places ==
- Kato, Guyana, a village in Guyana
- Katō, Hyōgo, a city in Hyōgo Prefecture, Japan
- Katō District, Hokkaido, a district located in Tokachi Subprefecture, Hokkaido, Japan
- Katowice, a city in Southern Poland, often abbreviated to Kato
- Mankato, a city in Southern Minnesota, often abbreviated to Kato

== Brands and enterprises ==
- Kato Airline, a small airline based in Evenes, Norway
- Kato Airport, an airport in Guyana
- Kato Precision Railroad Models, a manufacturer of model railroad equipment

== Fictional characters ==
- Kato (The Green Hornet), comic book character
- Kato, the main antagonist in Astrid Lindgren's book Mio, My Son
- Cato Fong (originally spelled "Kato"), character from the Pink Panther film series; see list of The Pink Panther characters

== People ==
- Kato (name), a given name and surname
- Katō (surname), a Japanese surname

=== Nickname or stage name ===
- Kato (DJ), Danish DJ
- Paul Diamond, Croatian and Canadian professional wrestler, also known as Kato
- Kate Lambert, British and American model and fashion designer, also known as Kato
- Kato Kaelin, American actor associated with O. J Simpson's trial
- Kato Ottio, Papua New Guinean rugby league player
- Kato Svanidze, first wife of Joseph Stalin

== Other uses ==
- Kato (instrument), a traditional musical instrument of Punjab
- Kato people or Kato tribe, a group of Native American people in the United States
  - Kato language, the language of the Kato tribe
- Kato technique, a method used for preparing faeces prior to examination for parasites
- KATO (AM), a radio station (1230 AM) licensed to Safford, Arizona, United States
- KATO-FM, a radio station (93.1 FM) licensed to New Ulm, Minnesota, United States
- Kato (restaurant), a Michelin-starred restaurant in West Los Angeles, California
- Young Kato, an English indie band
- KaitO, an English indie rock band, also known as Kato and Kaito

== See also ==
- Cato (disambiguation)
- Kaito (disambiguation)
