= Virgilius Maro Grammaticus =

Irish writer

Virgilius Maro Grammaticus (French: Virgile de Toulouse, fl. c. 625), known in English as Virgil the Grammarian or Virgil of Toulouse, is the author of two early medieval grammatical texts known as the Epitomae and the Epistolae.

== Biographical ==
It is unknown exactly when or where he was active: in the eleventh and twelfth centuries he was known to Abbo of Fleury and others as Virgil of Toulouse, and subsequent scholars have tried to attribute him to Spain, the Basque Country and Gaul. Apparent traces of Hebrew have also prompted suggestions that he may have been Jewish. Supposed knowledge of some Old Irish vocabulary and verse has led to the most recent attribution to Ireland, and there is good evidence that his writings were well known to early medieval Irish scholars. However, the Irish evidence is not watertight, and Virgil's origins remain undetermined.

However, Virgil can be dated with some confidence to the seventh century: he knew some parts of the Etymologiae by Isidore of Seville finished around 636; and was quoted before 709/10 by Aldhelm of Malmesbury. Quotations from Virgil in certain Irish computistical texts may place him in the first half of the seventh century, specifically before 658.

== Writings ==
His writings survive in around twenty manuscripts or fragments, dating from the eighth to the eleventh century. The three principal manuscripts (Paris, Bibliothèque nationale Latinus 13026; Amiens, Bibliothèque municipale, 426; and Naples, Biblioteca Nazionale IV.A.34) on which modern editions have been based were all written in early ninth-century France. In most manuscripts of Virgil also contain other grammatical and schoolroom texts. As a rule, the Epitomae travelled separately from the Epistolae, which are much more poorly represented in the surviving manuscripts: just one manuscript contains the entire text (Naples, Biblioteca Nazionale IV.A.34), and comparison with other fragments suggests its testimony may not always be trustworthy.

Virgil wrote at least two surviving works, the Epitomae and Epistolae. The number of books in both groups – 12 and 8 (though the last surviving Epitoma may have been numbered 15, implying there were once three more books now lost) – compares to the number of books in Donatus Ars Maior and Ars Minor. He displays knowledge of authors such as Isidore of Seville, Virgil and Aelius Donatus, but never quotes them by name. Instead one finds in his works a plethora of obscure and unlikely-sounding authorities mentioned nowhere else and quotations attributed to well-known authors which cannot be identified in their writings. Thus there are Varro, Cato (there are several people and writings called Cato from before Virgil's day, and which source he used is uncertain. The best known in his time may have been the Distichs of Cato, often called simply Cato), three Virgils, three Vulcans, Aeneas and Origenes, and also Sufphonias, Galbungus, Sagillus, Blastus, Gurgilius, Balapsidius, Ninus – the list can be expanded. Some of these names are clear fabrications, often displaying considerable knowledge of classical and patristic literature.

Although written in a similar style to late antique grammatical texts and incorporating some genuine grammatical material, there is much baffling and outlandish material contained in Virgil's writings: he discusses twelve kinds of Latin, of which only one is in regular use, and attributes much of his lore to grammarians up to a thousand years old, who debate questions such as the vocative of ego and write texts such as De laudibus indefunctorum (In praise of the undead). Often these grammatical authorities form the centre of anecdotes: Aeneas is often referred to as Virgil's teacher; an elderly Spanish grammarian visits Virgil in the dead of night; and others wage war with thousands of men over grammatical definitions. The oddity of Virgil's texts extends beyond ignorance or even parody, and it has been argued that his peculiar fabrications are a veiled plea for diversity and variety. However, a great deal remains uncertain about Virgil, his origins and his real purpose in writing.

== Bibliography ==
Editions and translations

- J. Huemer, ed., Virgilii Maronis grammatici opera (Leipzig, 1886)
- B. Löfstedt, ed., Virgilius Maro Grammaticus: Opera Omnia (Munich, 2003) [the most recent edition]
- A. Mai, ed., De octo partibus orationis (Epistolae I–VIII). Accedunt eiusdem epitomae (Rome, 1833) [the first edition]
- G. Polara, ed. and trans., Virgilio Marone grammatico: Epitomi ed Epistole (Naples, 1979) [contains facing page Italian translation]
- D. Tardi, trans., Les Epitomae de Virgile de Toulouse (Paris, 1928) [Huemer's text with French translation]

Recent secondary literature

- B. Bischoff, 'Die "zweite Latinität" des Virgilius Maro Grammaticus und seine jüdische Herkunft', Mittellateinisches Jahrbuch 23 (1988[1991]), 11–16
- M. Herren, 'Some New Light on the Life of Virgilius Maro Grammaticus', Proceedings of the Royal Irish Academy 79C (1979), 27–71
- M. Herren, 'The Hiberno-Latin Poems in Virgil the Grammarian', in De Tertullian aux Mozarabes. Mélanges offerts à J. Fontaine, ed. L. Holtz (Paris, 1992), pp. 141–55
- M. Herren, 'Virgil the Grammarian: a Spanish Jew in Ireland?', Peritia 9 (1995), 51–71
- D. Howlett, 'Seven Studies in Seventh-Century Texts', Peritia 10 (1996), 1–70
- P.-Y. Lambert, 'Deux notes sur Virgile le grammarien', in Mélanges François Kerlouégan, ed. D. Couso, N. Fick and B. Poulle (Paris, 1994), pp. 141–55
- V. Law, The Insular Latin Grammarians (Woodbridge, 1982)
- V. Law, 'Serious Aspects of the Wordplay of Virgilius Maro Grammaticus', in L’héritage des grammariens latins de l’Antiquité aux Lumières: Actes du colloque de Chantilly, 2–4 septembre 1987, ed. I. Rosier (Louvain and Paris, 1988), pp. 121–31; repr. with modifications in her Grammar and Grammarians in the Early Middle Ages (London, 1997), pp. 224–45
- V. Law, 'Learning to Read with the oculi mentis: Virgilius Maro Grammaticus', Journal of Literature and Theology 3 (1989), 159–72. JSTOR 23924768.
- V. Law, 'Fragments from the Lost Portions of the Epitomae of Virgilius Maro Grammaticus', Cambridge Medieval Celtic Studies 21 (1991), 113–25
- V. Law, Wisdom, Authority and Grammar in the Seventh Century: Decoding Virgilius Maro Grammaticus (Cambridge, 1995)
- B. Löfstedt, 'Zu den Quellen des Virgilius Maro Grammaticus', Eranos 79 (1981), 117–19
- B. Löfstedt, 'Spät- und Vulgarlateinsiches in der Sprache des Virgilius Maro Grammaticus', Latomus 40 (1981), 121–6
- B. Löfstedt, 'Textkritische Notizen zu Virgilius Maro Grammaticus', Latomus 40 (1981), 828–9
- B. Löfstedt, 'Zum Wortschatz des Virgilius Maro Grammaticus', Philologus 126 (1982), 99–110
- D. Ó Cróinín, 'The date, provenance, and earliest use of the writings of Virgilius Maro Grammaticus', in Tradition und Wertung. Festschrift für Franz Brunhölzl, ed. G. Bernt et al. (Sigmaringen, 1989), pp. 13–22
- A. P. McD. Orchard, 'Some Aspects of Seventh-Century Hiberno-Latin Syntax: a Statistical Approach', Peritia 6–7 (1987–88), 151–201
- G. Polara, 'Virgilio Marone e la parodia delle dottrini grammaticali', in L’héritage des grammariens latins de l’Antiquité aux Lumières: Actes du colloque de Chantilly, 2–4 septembre 1987, ed. I. Rosier (Louvain and Paris, 1988), pp. 109–20
- K. Smolak, 'Der dritte Virgil: ein Jüdischer Satiriker des Frühmittelalters?', Wiener Humanistisch Blätter 30 (1988), 16–27
