= Cato (ship) =

Several vessels have been named Cato:

- Cato (1800 ship) was launched at Stockton in 1800 and registered in London to Reeve & Green. She was wrecked on the Great Barrier Reef, Australia, in 1803.
- Cato (1807 ship) was a merchant vessel launched at Kingston upon Hull in 1807. She was a West Indiaman, a transport ship, and traded across the Atlantic between England and North America. She foundered in November 1841.

== See also ==
- HMS Cato, three British Royal Navy vessels
