= Miles Barber =

English slave-trader

Miles Barber (1733–1786+) was an English slave-trader from Lancaster who established a factory at Factory Island, Îles de Los in 1755.

== Slave trading voyages ==
These are some of the slave voyages connected to Miles Barber of the Slave Voyages database.

Voyage id	Ship	Date left	Date return	Captain	Owner	No. of enslaved Africans	Location in Africa	Location in Americas	Notes
#17434	Cato	20-1-1758	9-1-1759	Richard Millerson; John Tallon	Miles Barber; Richard Millerson; Thomas Hind; John Preston; Miles Houseman	288 of 336*	Sierra Leone estuary	Charleston	
#24029	Thetis	23-2-1759	1759/1760	John Preston	Miles Barber; Thomas Hinde; John Braithwaite; William Watson	212 of 248*	Windward Coast	Charleston	
#24504	Cato	1759	Aug 1760	Richard Millerson; Reed	Miles Barber; Richard Millerson; Thomas Hind; William Watson	360 of 400*	Sierra Leone estuary	Jamaica	
#24508	Thetis	1760	1760	John Preston	Miles Barber	209 of 250*	Africa, port unspecified	Martinique	
#24032	Marquis of Granby	1761	27 October 1761	Robert Dodson	Miles Barber	200 of 225*	Gambia	Charleston	
#90932	Lyon	30 May 1761	23 February 1763	William Parkinson	Miles Barber; William Parkinson; Thomas Hind	287 of 352	West Central Africa and St. Helena	Jamaica; Guadeloupe	
