= Wu Kai Sha =

Area of Hong Kong

- Traditional Chinese: 烏溪沙
- Simplified Chinese: 乌溪沙
Transcriptions
Standard Mandarin
- Hanyu Pinyin: Wūxīshā
Yue: Cantonese
- Jyutping: wu1 kai1 saa1

Wu Kwai Sha/U Kwai Sha
- Traditional Chinese: 烏龜沙
- Simplified Chinese: 乌龟沙
Transcriptions
Standard Mandarin
- Hanyu Pinyin: Wūguīshā
Yue: Cantonese
- Jyutping: wu1 gwai1 saa1

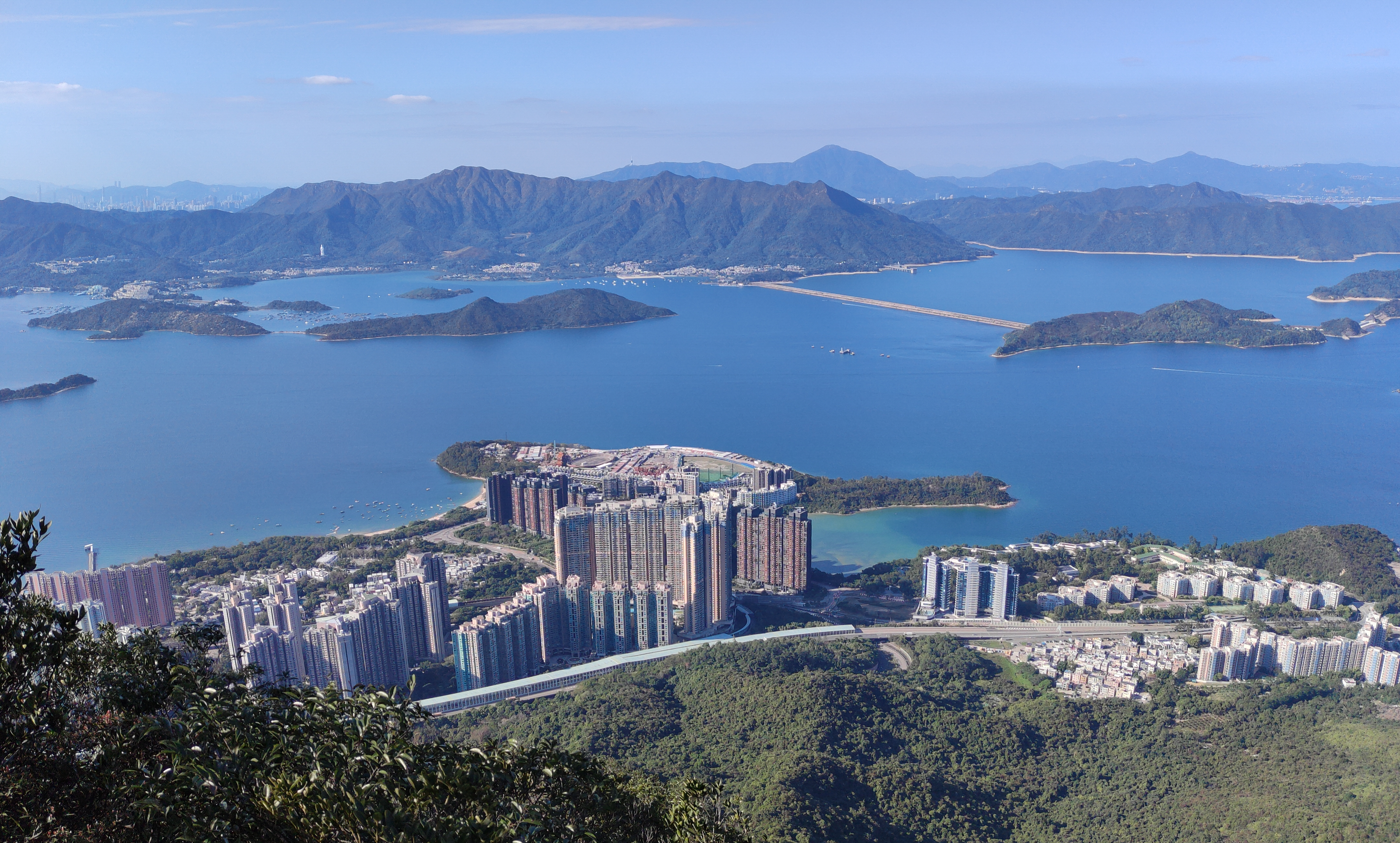
View of Wu Kai Sha in 2022. Tolo Harbour, Pat Sin Leng and Plover Cove Reservoir are visible in the background.

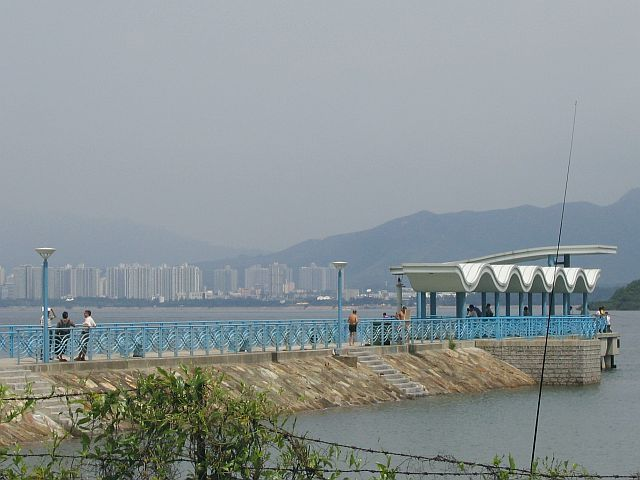
Wu Kai Sha Public Pier.

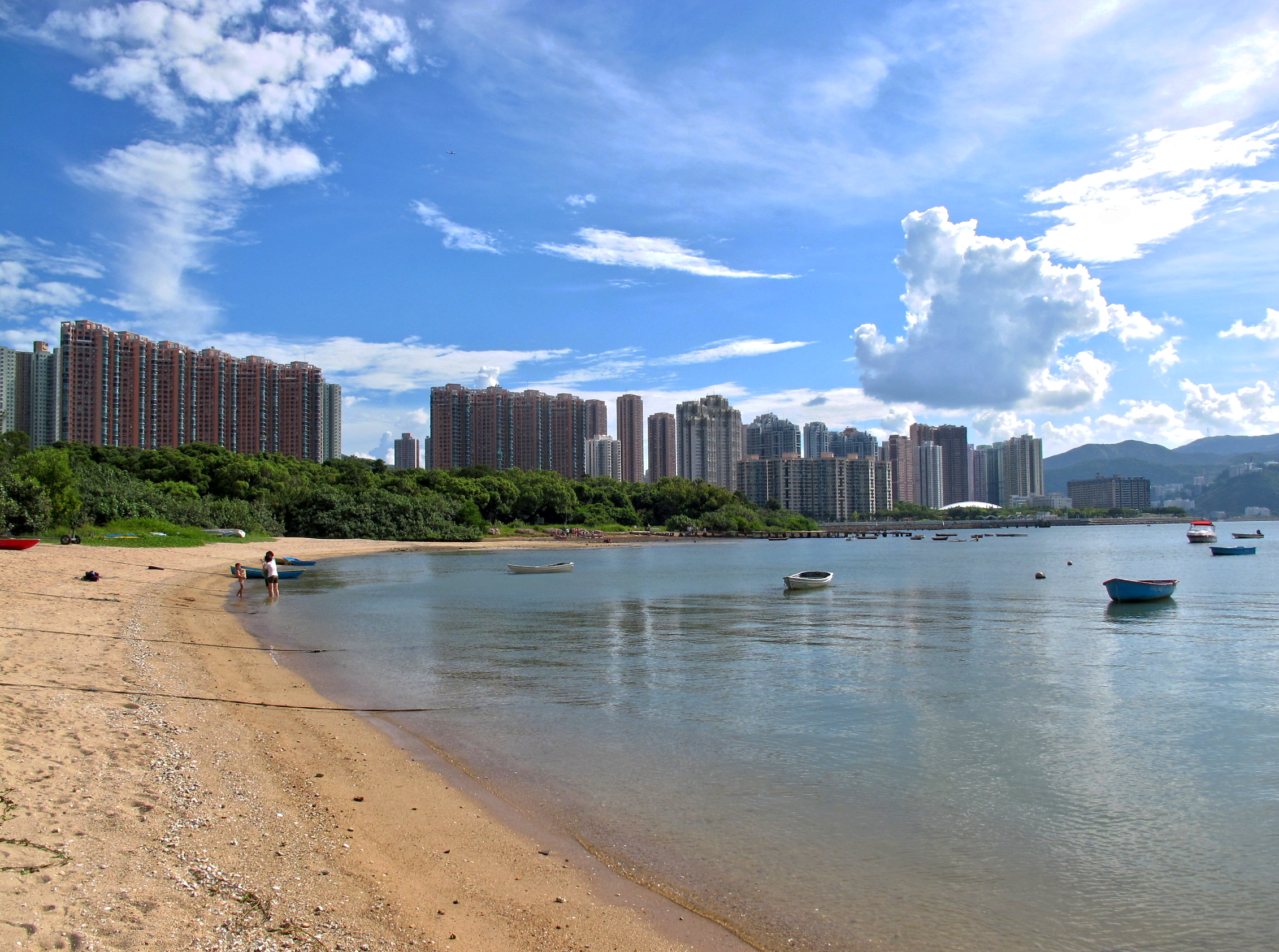
To Tau Wan.

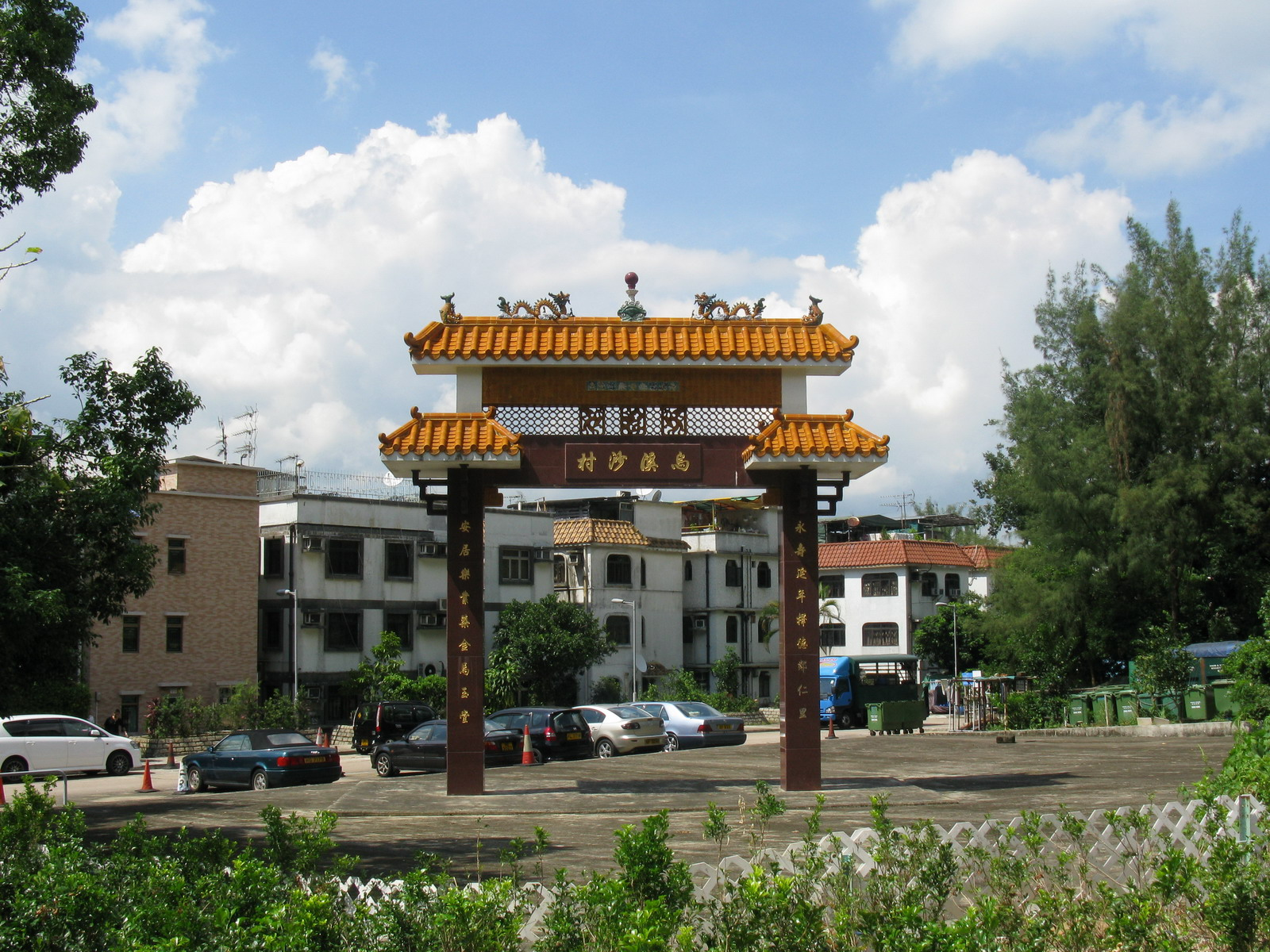
Wu Kai Sha Village.

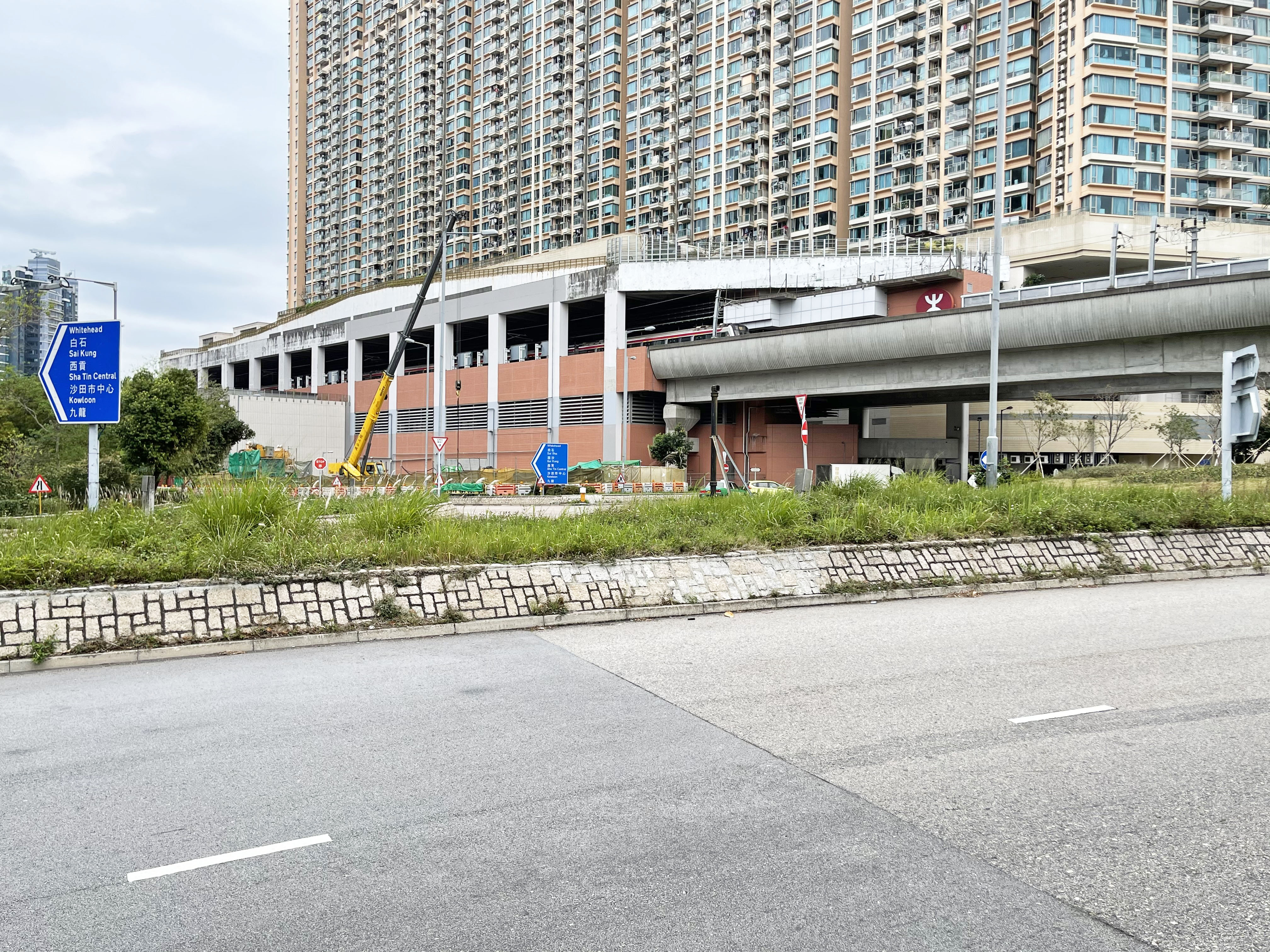
Wu Kai Sha station and Lake Silver private housing estate.

Wu Kai Sha (Chinese: 烏溪沙; lit. 'Black Sand Creek'), formerly known as Wu Kwai Sha or U Kwai Sha (烏龜沙; 'Black Turtle Sands'), is a place at the shore of Tolo Harbour, northwest of Ma On Shan in the New Territories, Hong Kong. Wu Kai Sha is within the Sha Tin District, one of the 18 districts of Hong Kong. The name roughly translates as 'Black Sand Creek', based on the accumulation of black iron ore which traditionally flowed down from the Ma On Shan peak.

== Administration ==
Wu Kai Sha (including Cheung Kang) is a recognized village under the New Territories Small House Policy. Wu Kai Sha is one of the villages represented within the Sha Tin Rural Committee. For electoral purposes, Wu Kai Sha is part of the Wu Kai Sha constituency, which is currently represented by Li Wing-shing.

== History ==
Originally there were only a few villages in the area, like Wu Kai Sha Village (烏溪沙村). It is now an extension of the Ma On Shan New Town.

At the time of the 1911 census, the population of Wu Kai Sha Village was 135. The number of males was 59.

The vicinity to the northeast is called Whitehead (白石) in English. The area was once home to Whitehead Detention Centre, the largest of the detention centres for Vietnamese boat people in Hong Kong.

== Villages ==
Villages in the Wu Kai Sha area include:

- Cheung Kang (長庚)
- To Tau Wan Village (渡頭灣)
- Wu Kai Sha Village (烏溪沙村)

== Features ==
Wu Kai Sha is famous for a campsite, Wu Kwai Sha Youth Village of Chinese Y M C A of Hong Kong. There is also a beach near the Wu Kwai Sha Youth Village.

Now Wu Kai Sha consists of several high-end housing estates, including Lake Silver (2218 units), Double Cove (928 units), The Altissimo (547 units), Seanorama (454 units), St Barths (353 units), Silversands, and The Entrance (148 units). It centers around Double Cove Place Shopping Arcade. The area also features a wet market.

Other features include:

- Li Po Chun United World College
- Starfish Bay
- Whitehead Club Golf Driving Range
- Wu Kai Sha Beach
- Wu Kai Sha Pebbles Beach
- Wu Kai Sha Pier
- Yong Cheng Yuan Market

== Transport ==
Before the area was developed, there existed only rough roads to the area. Many residents and visitors took kaito boats from Ma Liu Shui, near the MTR University station, across Tolo Harbour to the area.

With the extension of the new town to the northwestern side of Ma On Shan, roads were extended and expanded. Sai Sha Road is an alternative route to Sai Kung. In 2001, the Kowloon-Canton Railway Corporation began construction of the Ma On Shan Rail (now the Tuen Ma line), which currently terminates at Wu Kai Sha station.

There is a bus terminus with the following routes:

- Kowloon/New Territories: 40X, 86P, 87E, 89D, 89S, 99, 274P, 581, X89D, N287
- To Hong Kong Island: 680P, 680X, 682, 682A, 682P, 980X
- To Lantau Island: A41P, NA40, X40
- Minibus: 807B, 807K, 807X
