= Rudolf Steiner University College =

Private university college in Oslo, Norway

- Rudolf Steinerhøyskolen
- Type: Fully state-funded private university college
- Established: 1981; 45 years ago
- Rector: Gerd Eva Valøen
- Students: 165 (2008)
- Location: Oslo, Norway; 59°55′25″N 10°43′01″E
- Campus: Urban
- Website: www.rshoyskolen.no

Rudolf Steiner University College (Norwegian: Rudolf Steinerhøyskolen; RSH) is a state-accredited and state-funded private university college in Oslo, Norway.

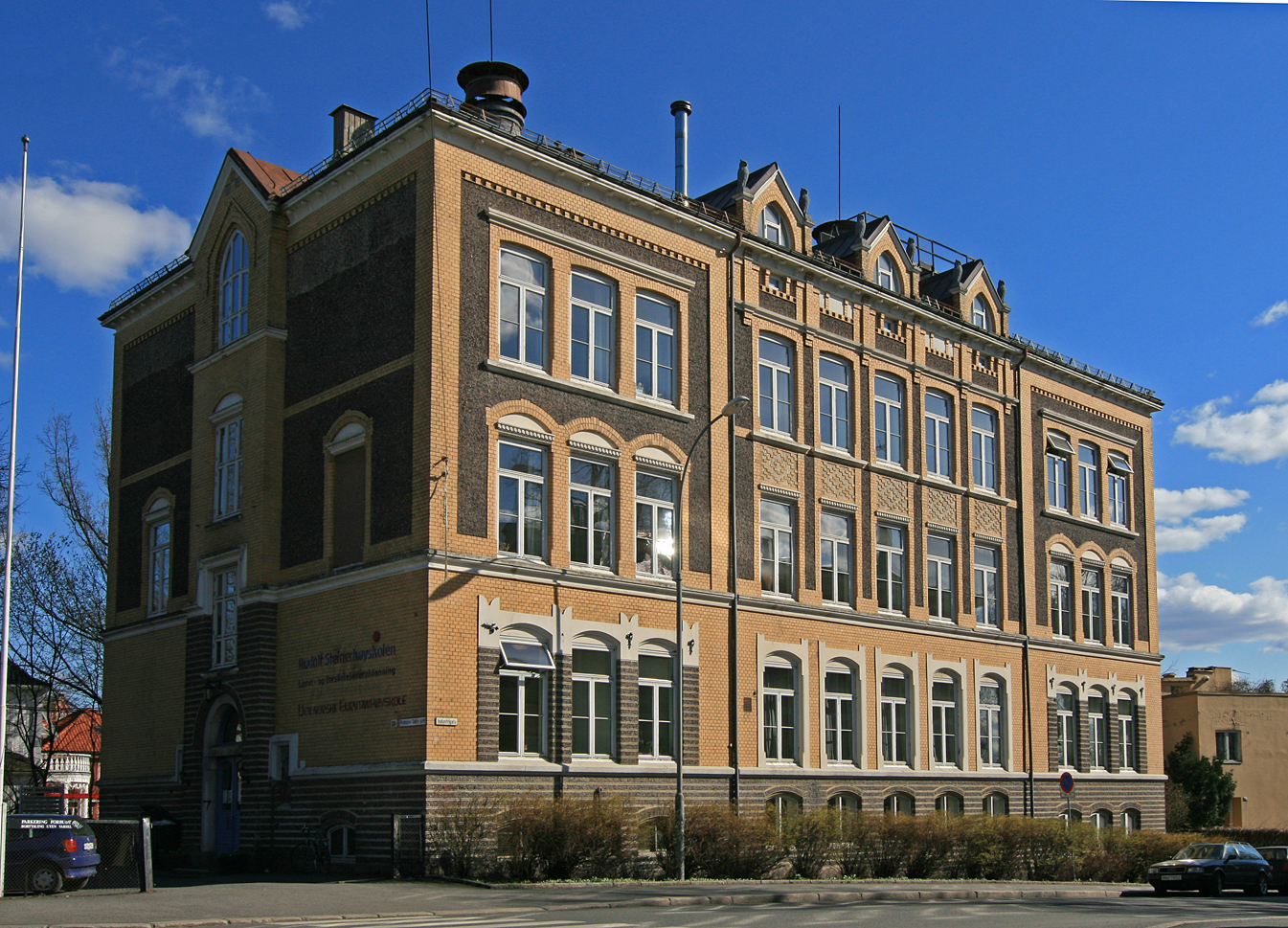
Rudolf Steiner University College, Oslo

It was founded in 1981 and is recognised under the Law for Private University Colleges and is fully state-funded (state funding increased gradually from 50% in 1983 to 100% from 1997 onwards). The university college offers bachelor's degrees in Waldorf education for teachers and kindergarten teachers, a master's degree in Waldorf education, and various other courses. It is organised as a non-profit foundation, and its board of trustees is chaired by Cato Schiøtz.

In cooperation with the Alanus University of Arts and Social Sciences (Germany), the university college publishes the international academic journal Research on Steiner Education. It is also involved in cooperation with East European countries, hosting the International Waldorf Summer Seminar.

Since 1994, the former Berle School in Professor Dahls gate 30, Frogner, has served as its main building. The college also has a campus in Fyresdal.
