= Cato (given name) =

Cato is the given name of:

- Cato Alexander (1780–1858), American emancipated slave and bar owner, considered by some to be "America's first celebrity bartender"
- Cato Erstad (born 1964), Norwegian footballer
- Cato Maximilian Guldberg (1836–1902), Norwegian mathematician and chemist
- Cato Guhnfeldt (born 1951), Norwegian journalist and non-fiction writer
- Cato Hansen (born 1988), Norwegian footballer
- Cato André Hansen (born 1972), Norwegian football coach and former player
- Cato (spy), Cato Howe, a slave who was an American Patriot spy and courier during the American Revolutionary War
- Cato June (born 1979), American former National Football League player
- Cato T. Laurencin (born 1959), American engineer, physician, scientist, innovator and professor
- Cato Nordbeck, Norwegian former professional racing cyclist, winner of the Norwegian National Road Race Championship in 1965
- Cato Perkins (died 1805), African-American slave who became a missionary to Sierra Leone
- Cato Schiøtz (born 1948), Norwegian barrister and former judge
- Cato Sells (1859–1948), American politician, lawyer and commissioner at the Bureau of Indian Affairs from 1913 to 1921
- Cato Sundberg (born 1981), Norwegian singer, guitarist and songwriter
- Cato van Ee (born 1990), Dutch-American fashion model
- Cato Wadel (1936−2011), Norwegian social anthropologist
- Cato West, American military officer and politician, Secretary of the Mississippi Territory and acting territorial governor of Mississippi in 1804 and 1805
