= Kaito =

- Pronunciation: [kaito] Tokyo:[keito]
- Gender: Male
- Language: Japanese

Origin
- Origin: (Japan) Japanese
- Meaning: Sea, Ocean, Soar, Fly.
- Region of origin: Japan

Other names
- Alternative spelling: かいと, カイト, 海斗, 凱斗, 開士, 魁斗, 海翔, 海人, 快斗, 界人, 嘉惟人, 海都
- Variant form: Kaitō

Kaito is a popular masculine Japanese given name. The name Kaito is a male name of Japanese origin. (written: かいと, カイト, 海斗, 凱斗, 開士, 魁斗, 海翔, 海人, 快斗, 界人, 嘉惟人 or 海都)

Notable people with the name include:

- Kaito Abe (阿部 海大; born 1999), Japanese footballer
- Kaito Anzai (安西 海斗; born 1998), Japanese footballer
- Kaito Chida (千田 海人; born 1994), Japanese footballer
- Kaito Ishikawa (石川 界人; born 1993), Japanese voice actor
- Kaito Kiyomiya (清宮 海斗; born 1996), Japanese professional wrestler
- Kaito Nakamura (中村 嘉惟人; born 1998), Japanese actor and model
- Kaito Taniguchi (谷口 海斗; born 1995), Japanese footballer
- Kaito Yamamoto (山本 海人; born 1985), Japanese football player

== Fictional characters ==
- Kaito (software), Vocaloid singing synthesizer
- Kaito, character in Hunter × Hunter
- Kaito, character in Project Kaito by Michael Chasteen
- Kaito, character in "The Last Ship" ... called by his last name, Takehaya
- Kaito, character in Road 96: Mile 0
- Kaito Daimon, a main character in the anime Phi Brain: Puzzle of God
- Kaito Domoto, main character in the anime Mermaid Melody as the love interest of the mermaid Princess Lucia of the Pacific Ocean
- Kaito Fuujin, character in Little Battlers Experience WARS
- Kaito Goshikida, character in Kikai Sentai Zenkaiger and Avataro Sentai Donbrothers
- Kaito Kumon, character in Kamen Rider Gaim
- Kaito Kuroba (黒羽 快斗), the Phantom Thief Kid from Detective Conan manga series
- Kaito Momota, character in Danganronpa V3: Killing Harmony
- Kaito Onogi, a character in the light novel series Tsurune.
- Kaito Saeki, character in Generation Xth
- Kaito Tenjo, character in Yu-Gi-Oh! Zexal
- Yuna D. Kaito, character in the manga and ongoing 2018 anime of Cardcaptor Sakura: Clear Card
- Kaito Fuji (歩二 魁斗), a character in the supernatural mobile game Tokyo Debunker

== See also ==
- Kaito (disambiguation)
- Kato (disambiguation)
