= To Tau Wan =

Coordinates: 22.433139°N 114.239654°E

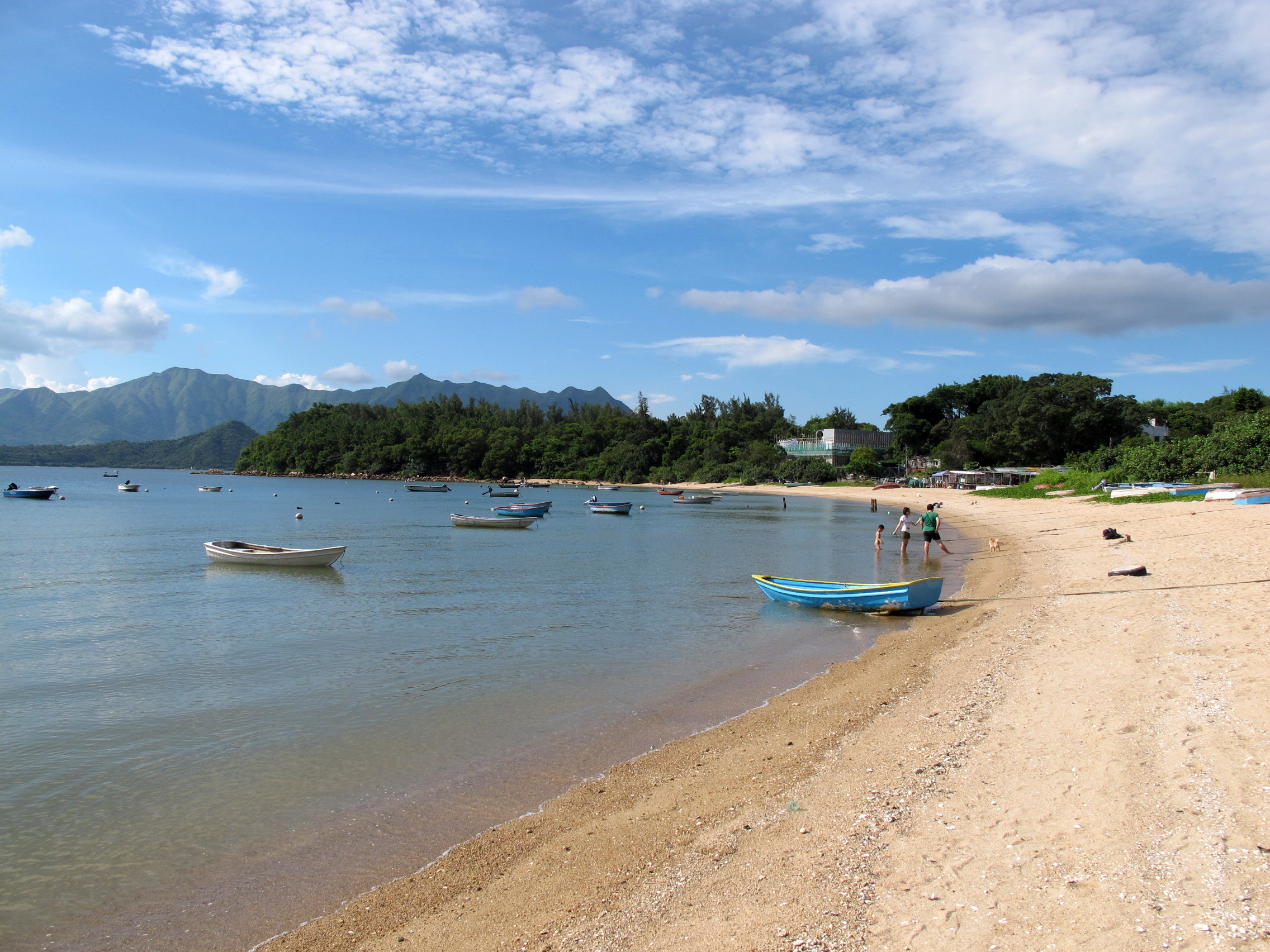
Beach at To Tau Wan.

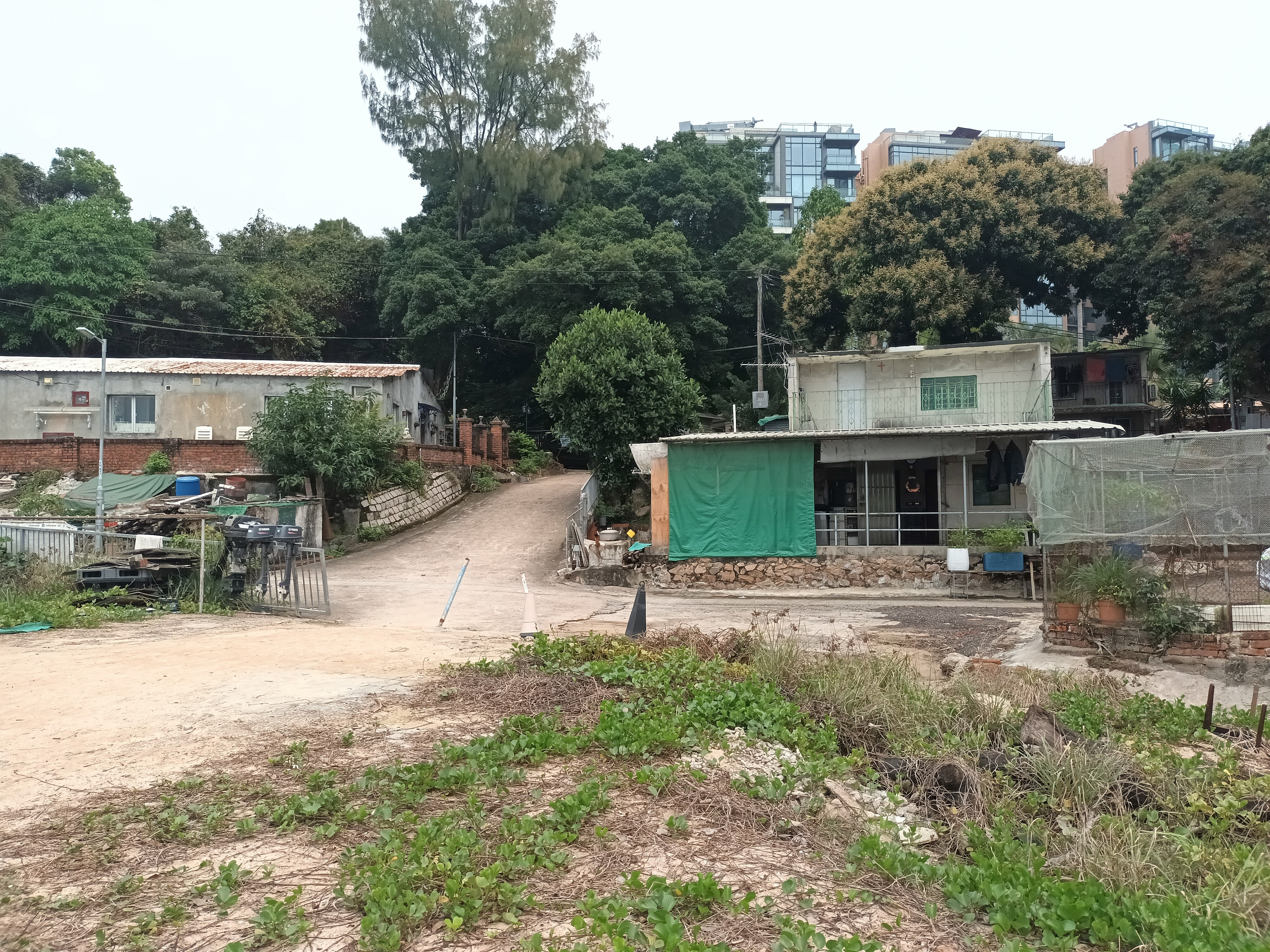
To Tau Wan Village.

To Tau Wan (Chinese: 渡頭灣) is a bay and a village in Wu Kai Sha, Sha Tin District, Hong Kong.
