= Wu Kwai Sha Youth Village =

Beach camp in Hong Kong

Coordinates: 22.428004°N 114.236121°E

- Traditional Chinese: 烏溪沙青年新村
- Simplified Chinese: 乌溪沙青年新村
Transcriptions
Standard Mandarin
- Hanyu Pinyin: Wūxīshā Qīngnián Xīncūn
Yue: Cantonese
- Jyutping: wu1 kai1 saa1 cing1 nin4 san1 cyun1

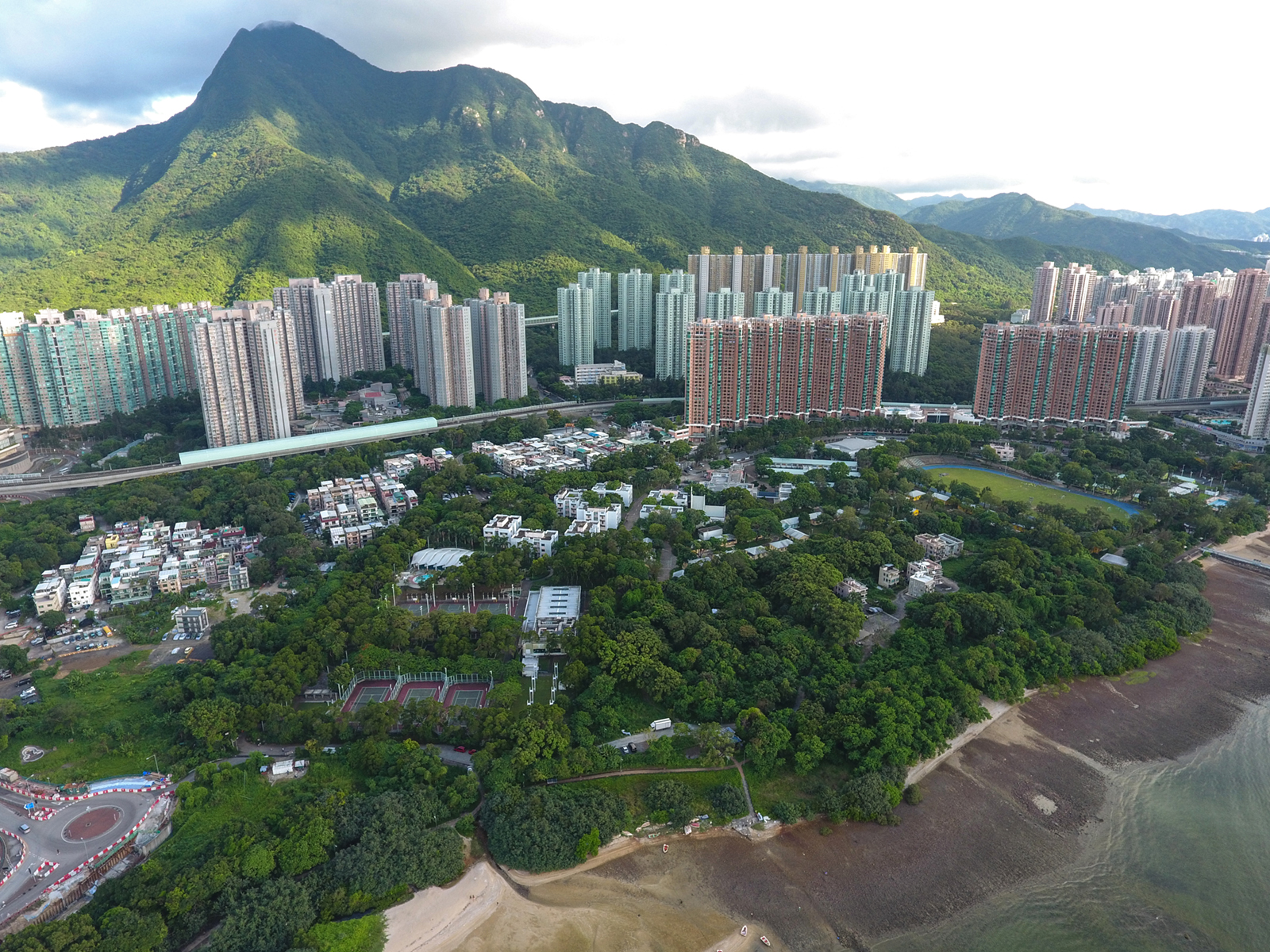
Wu Kai Sha Youth Village in July 2017

The Wu Kwai Sha Youth Village (Chinese: 烏溪沙青年新村) is a beach camp in Wu Kai Sha, Ma On Shan, Sha Tin, New Territories, operated by the Chinese YMCA of Hong Kong.

== History ==
The camp was originally constructed in 1955 (71 years ago) as the "Children's Village in Wu Kai Sha" (烏溪沙兒童新村), when it was an orphanage, or orphan's village, with up to 1,000 children. The orphanage and children's hospital services ceased in 1971 after which the land was handed over to the Chinese Y M C A of Hong Kong to develop into a holiday camp and beach resort, and renamed Chinese Y M C A of Hong Kong Wu Kai Sha Youth Village. When the camp was opened there was no road access, and the only transport was a kaito service from the Wu Kai Sha Public Pier to Ma Liu Shui. In the 1980s, roads were constructed.

== Features ==
The campsite comprises an area of 11 hectares, and can accommodate up to 1,100 residential campers and 1,000 day campers.

== Gallery ==
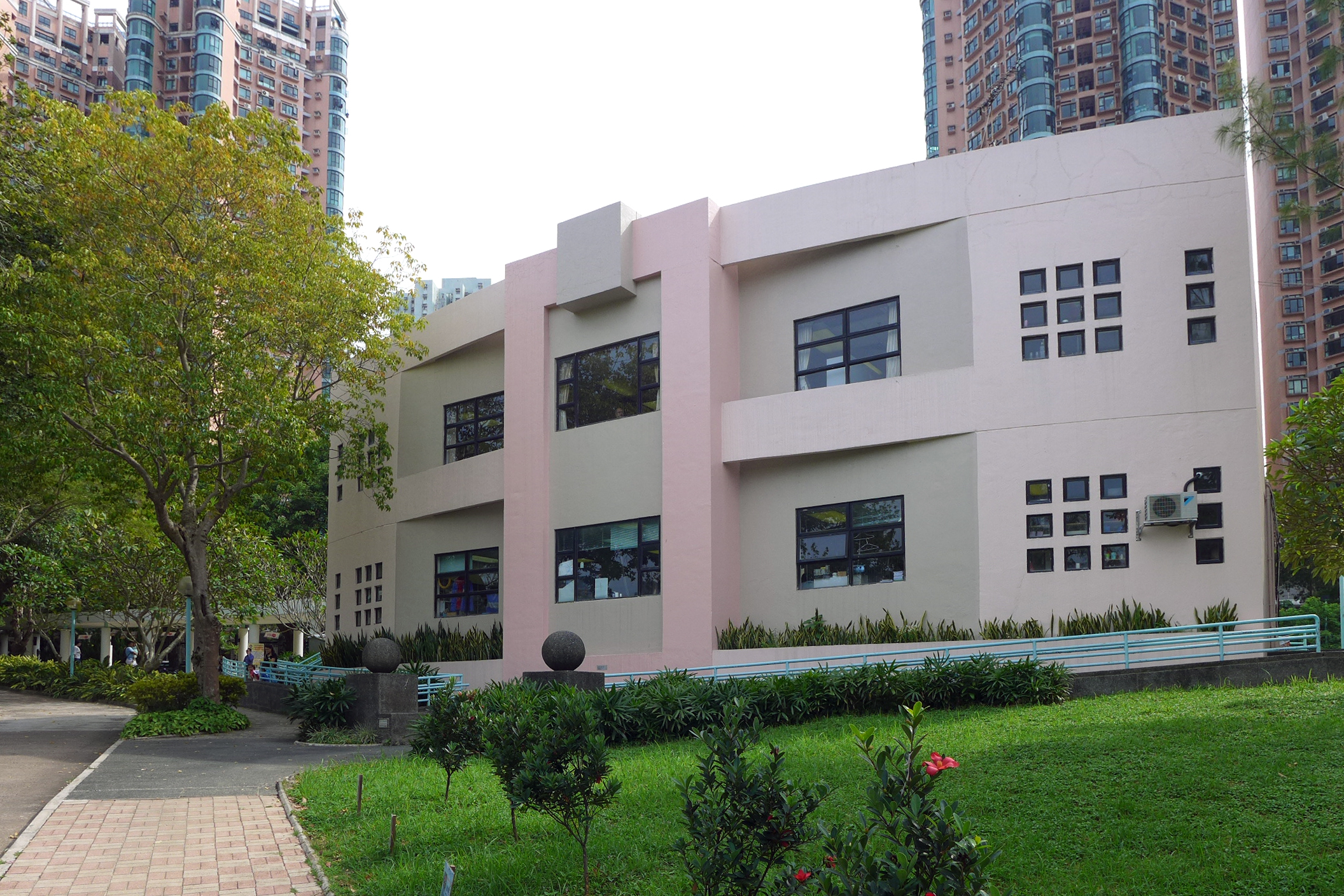
Admin building in October 2016

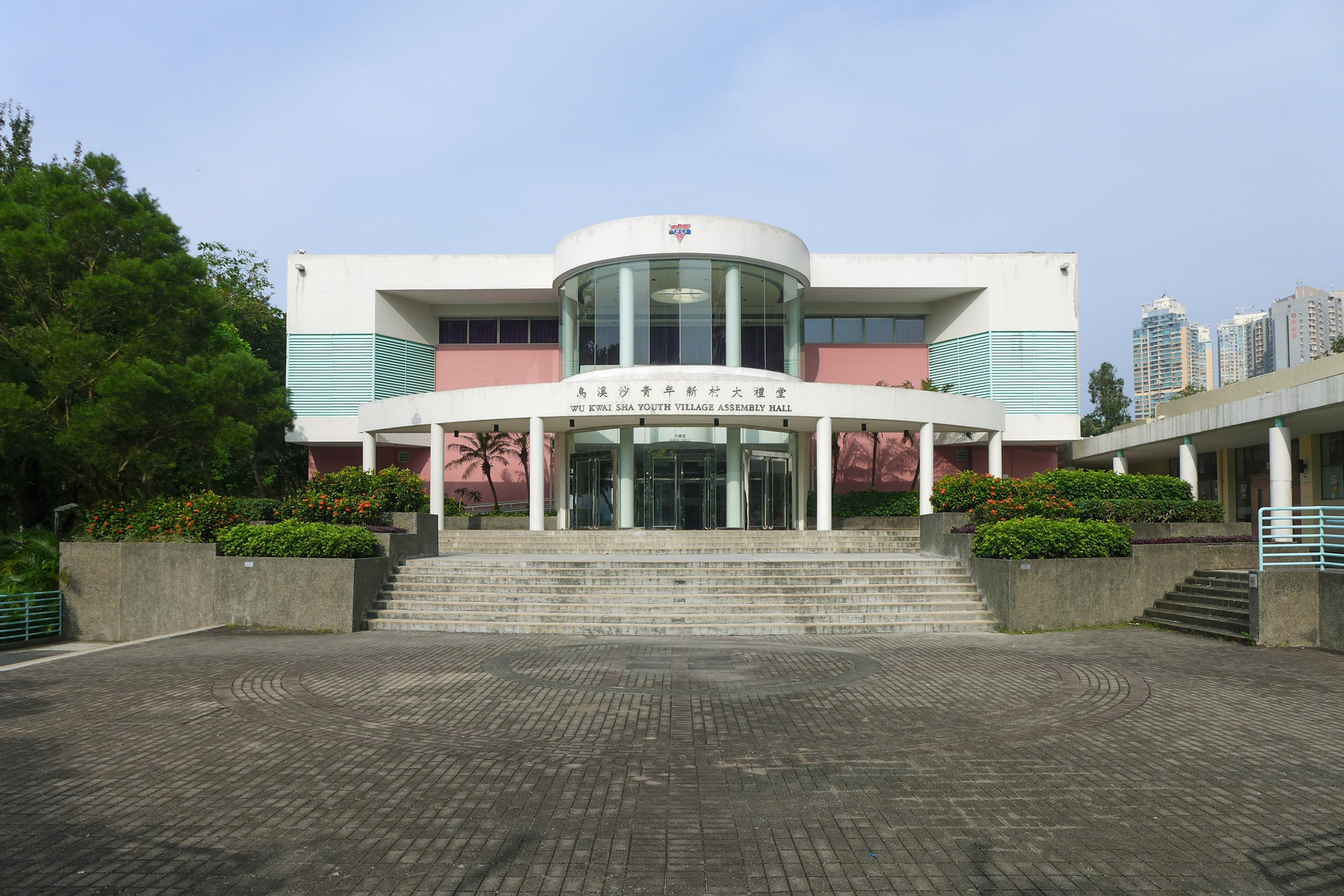
Village Hall in October 2016

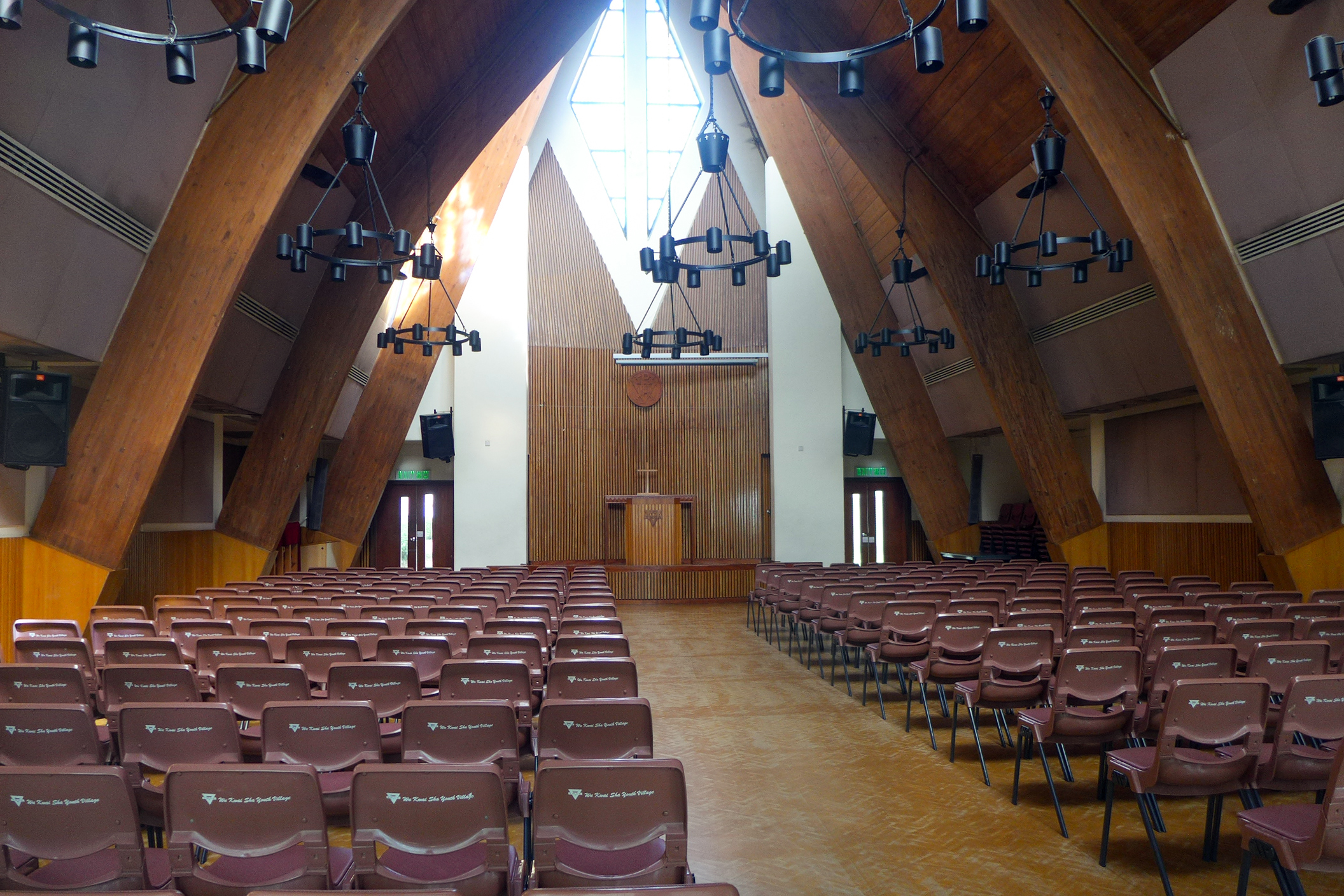
Chapel in October 2016

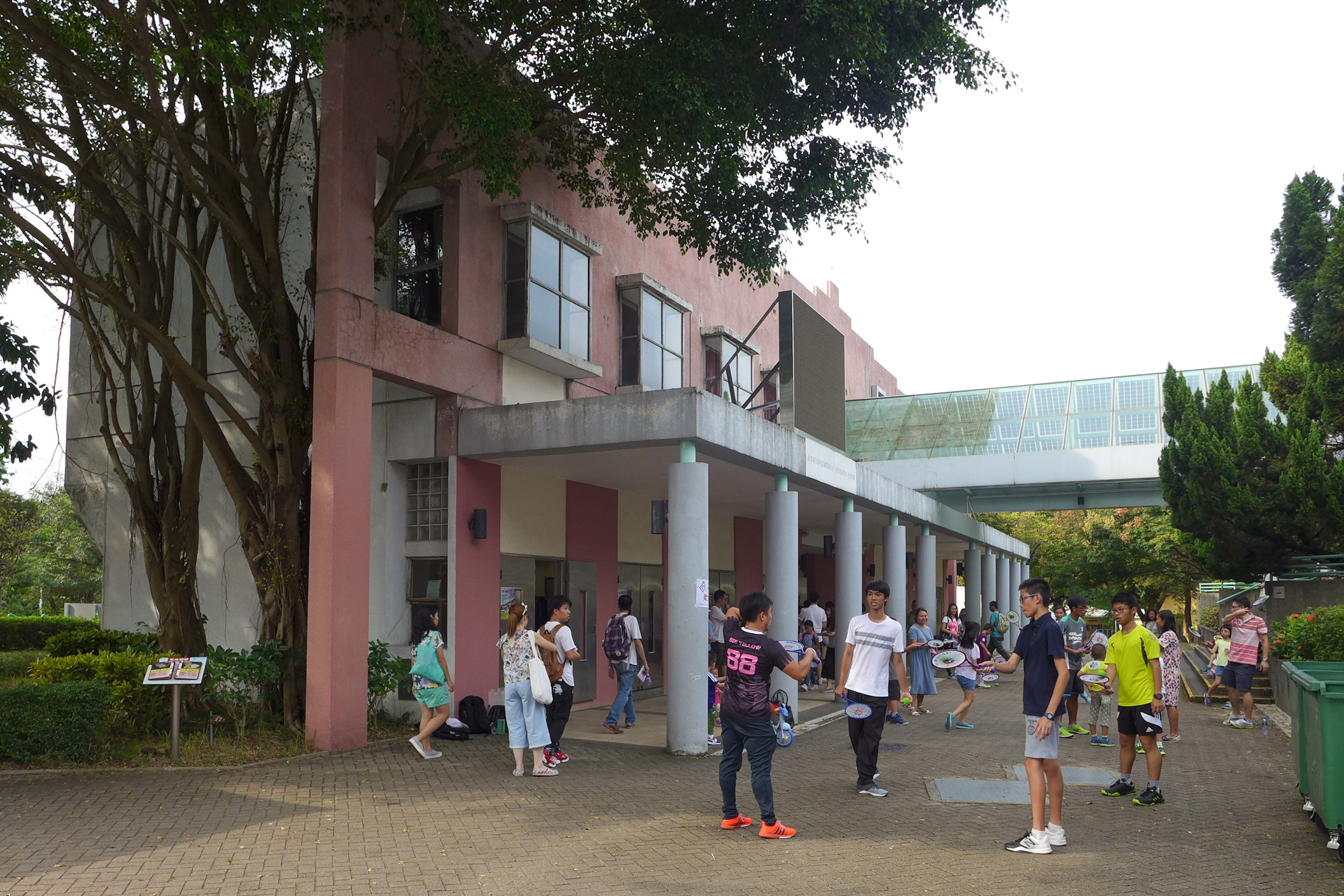
Function rooms in October 2016

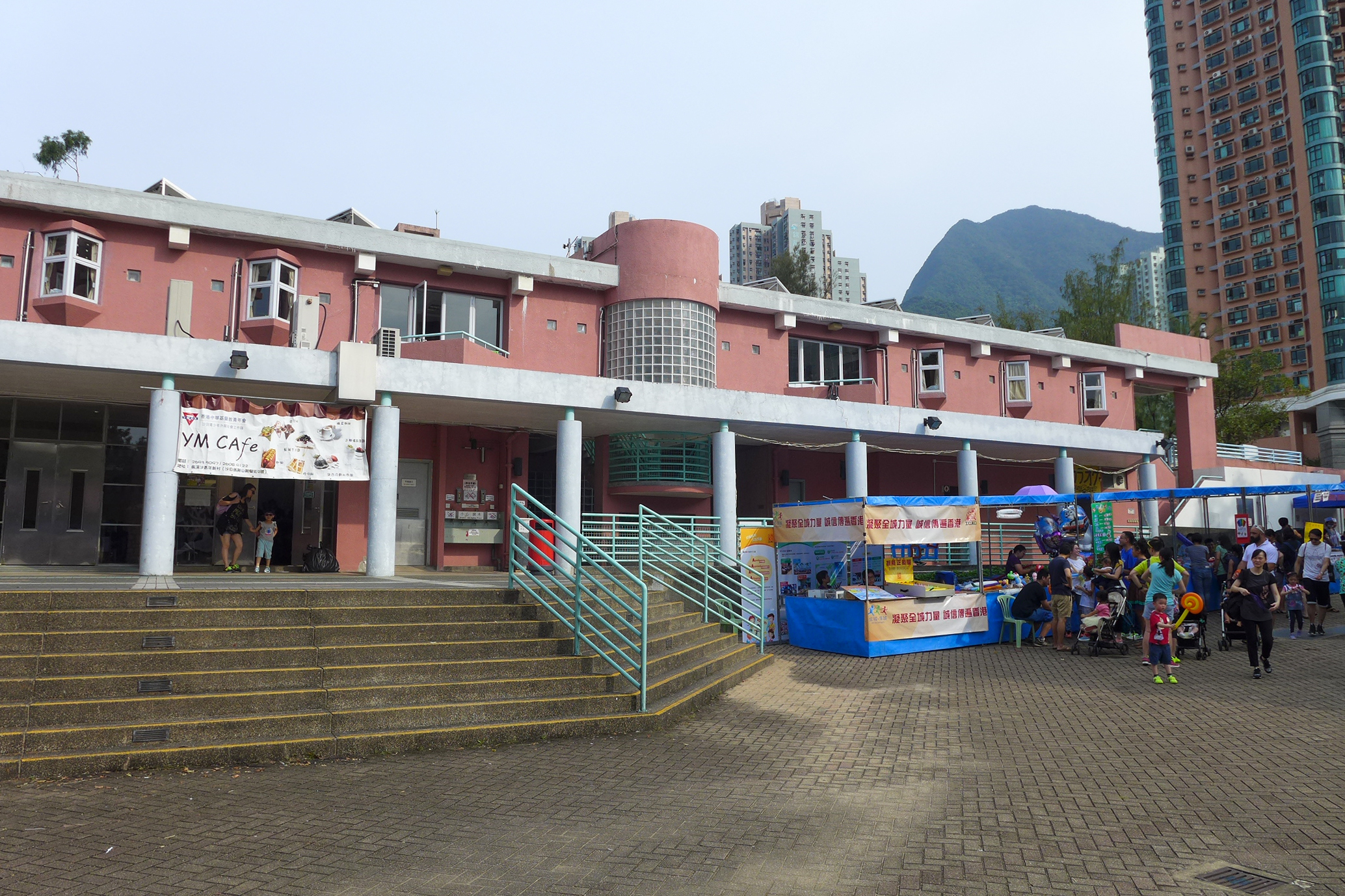
Canteen in October 2016

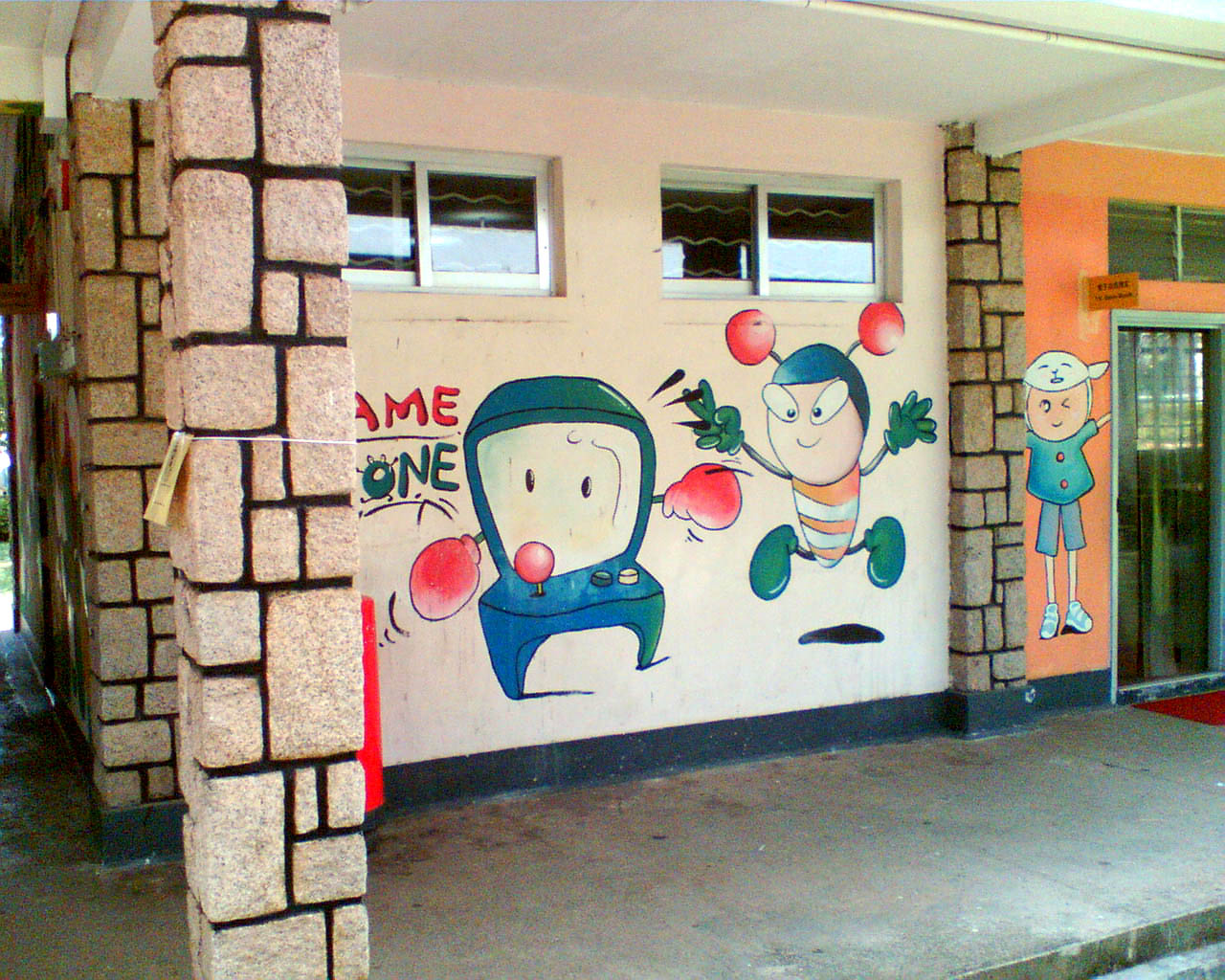
Play rooms in June 2006

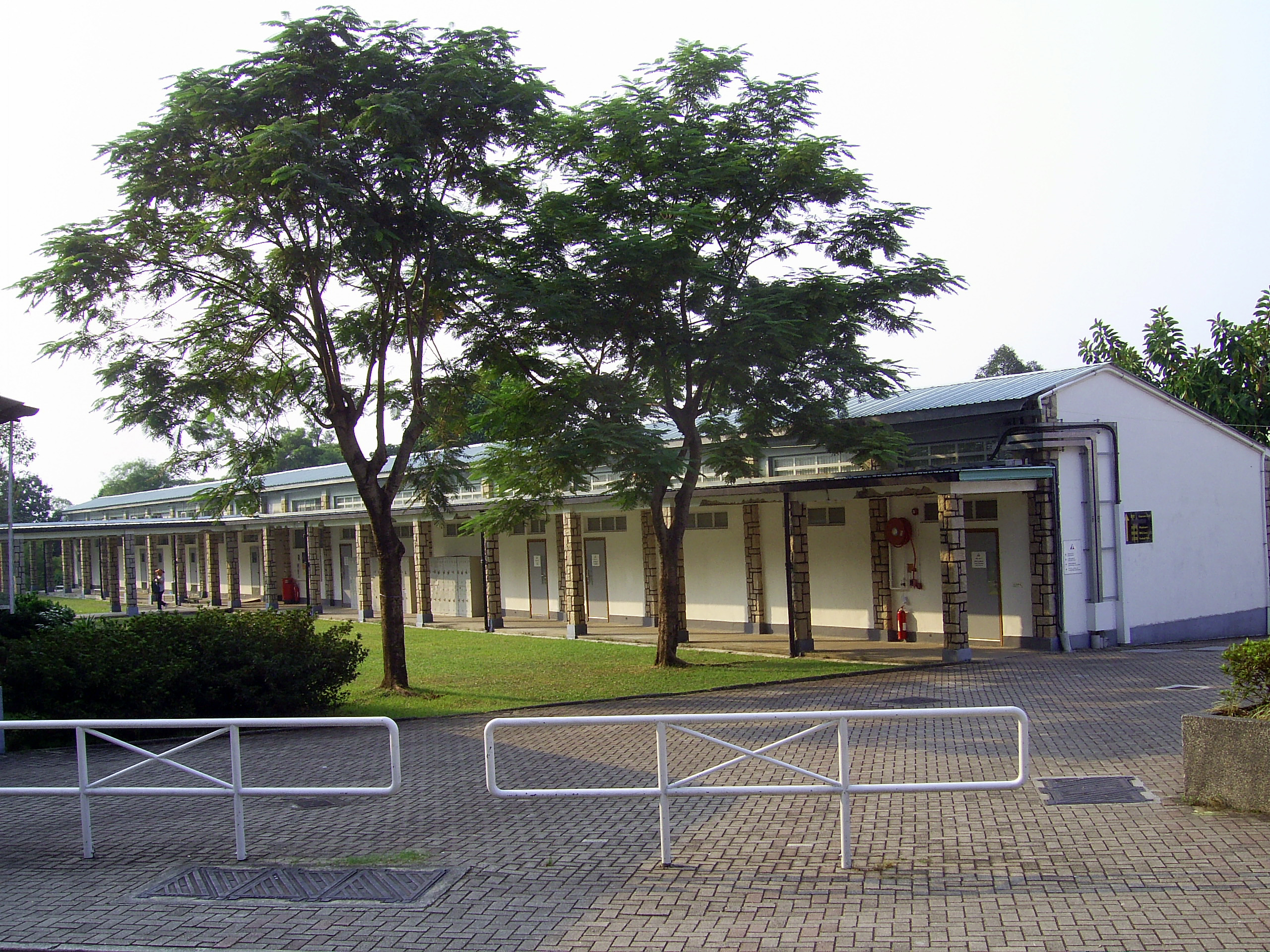
Classrooms in October 2009

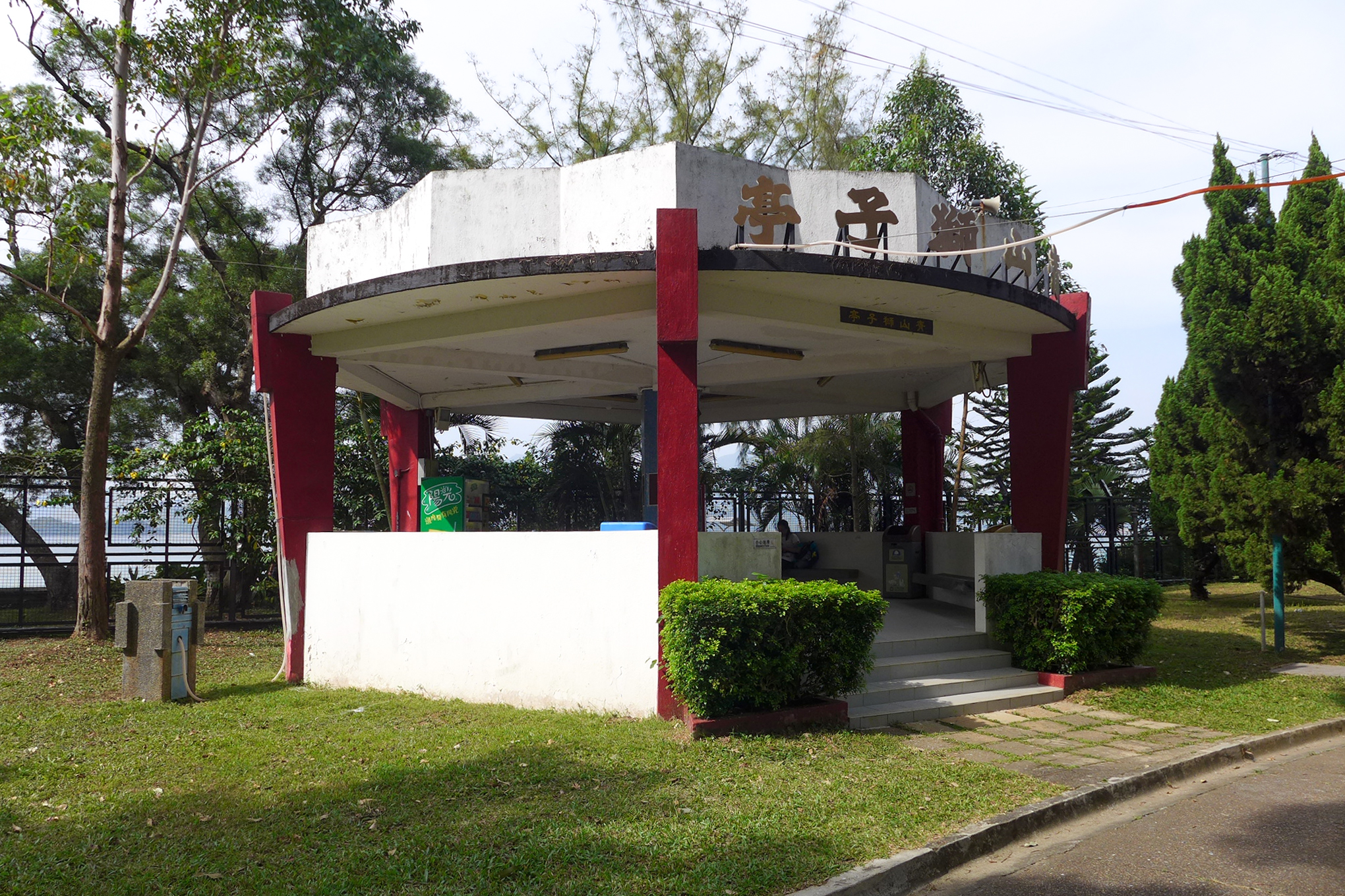
Lion pavilion in October 2016

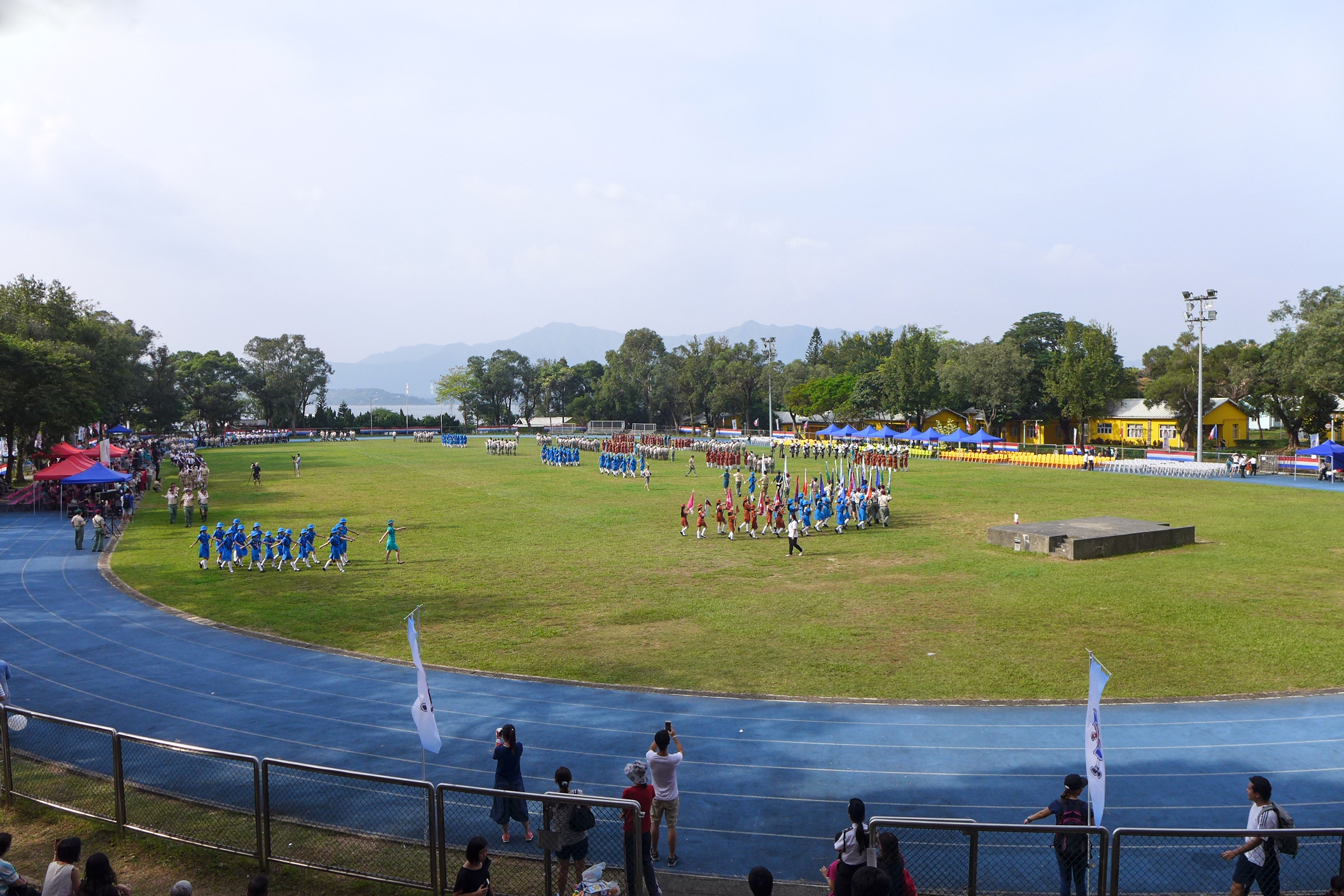
Soccer pitch in October 2016

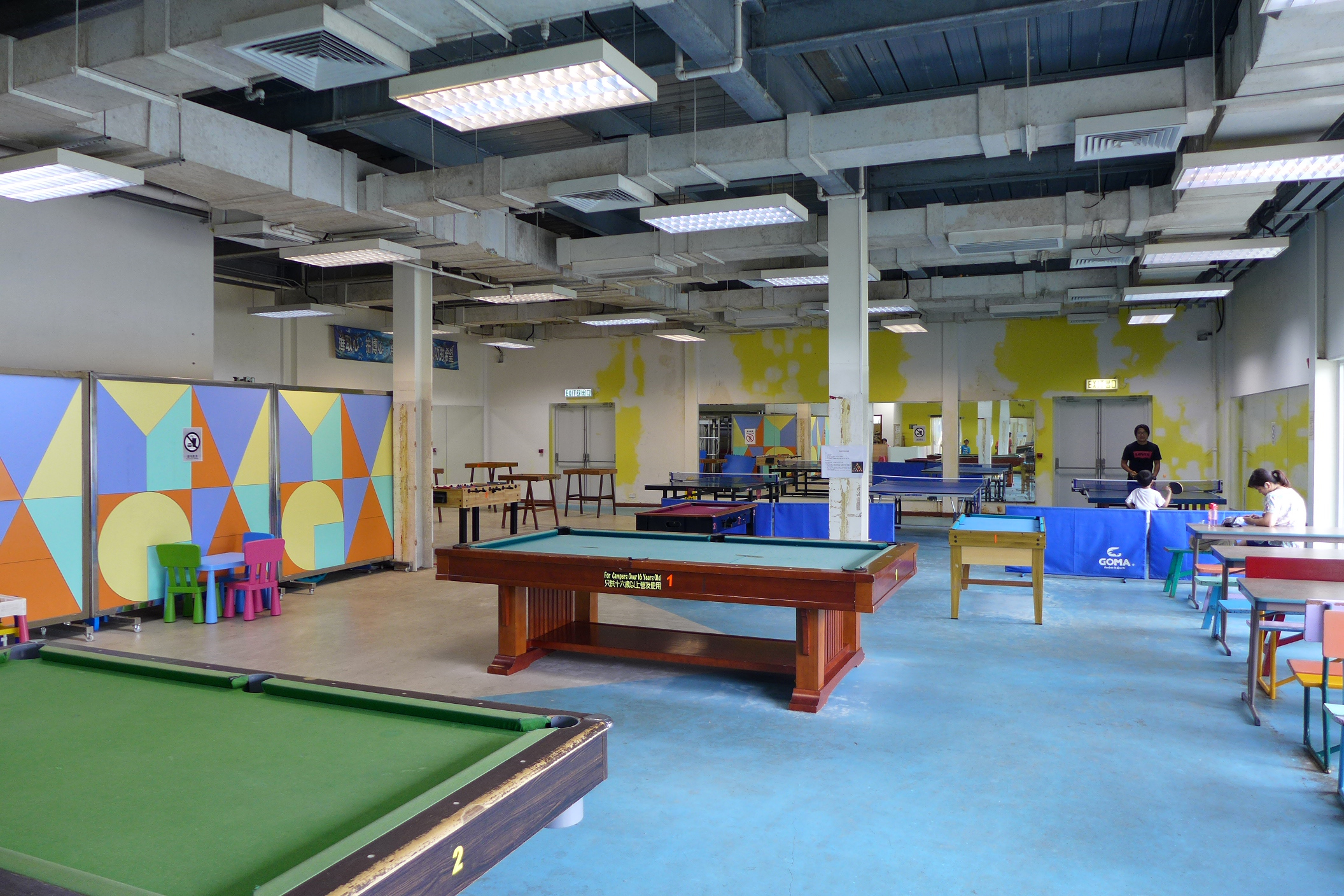
Recreation Room in October 2016

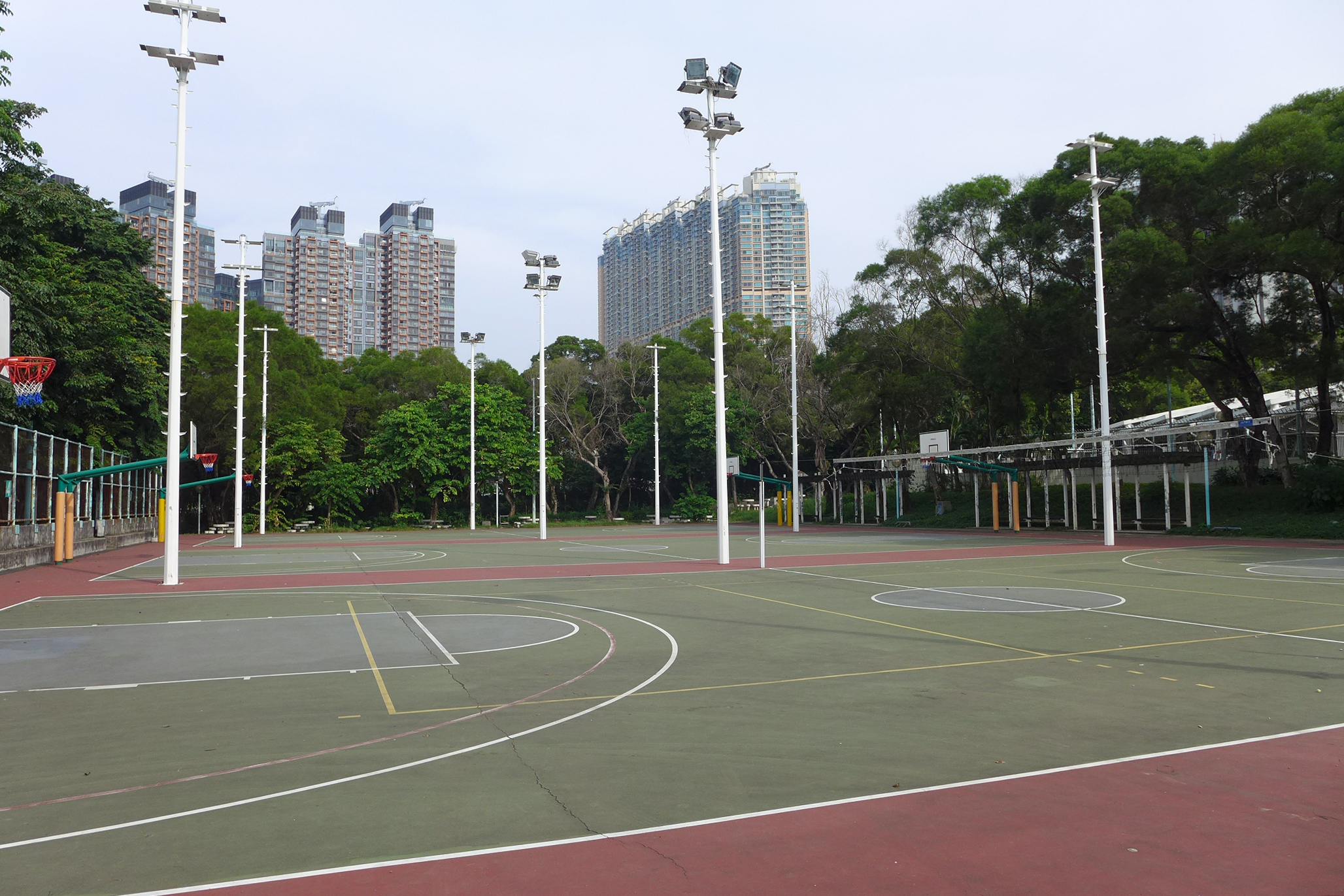
Basketball court in October 2016

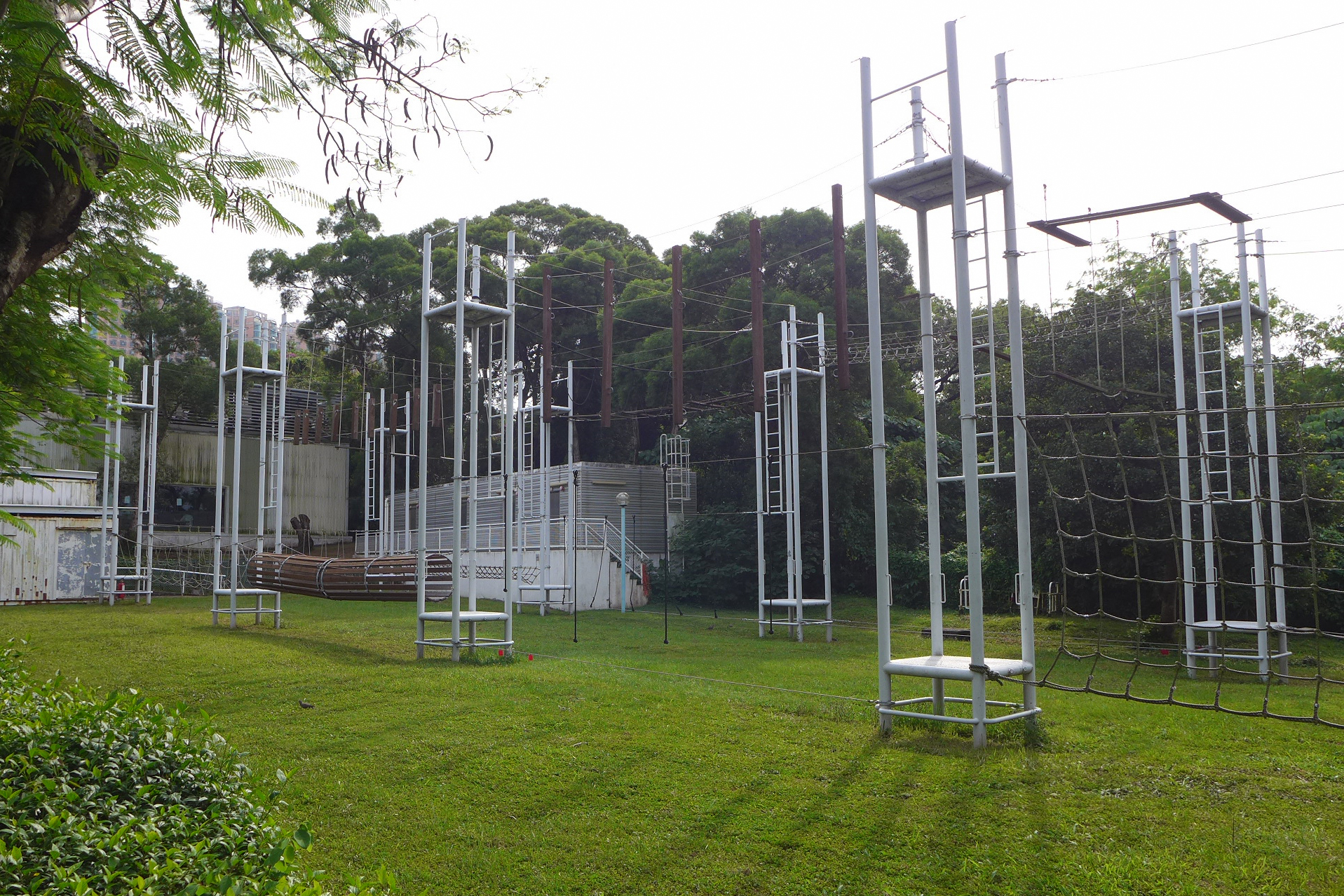
Rope Course in October 2016

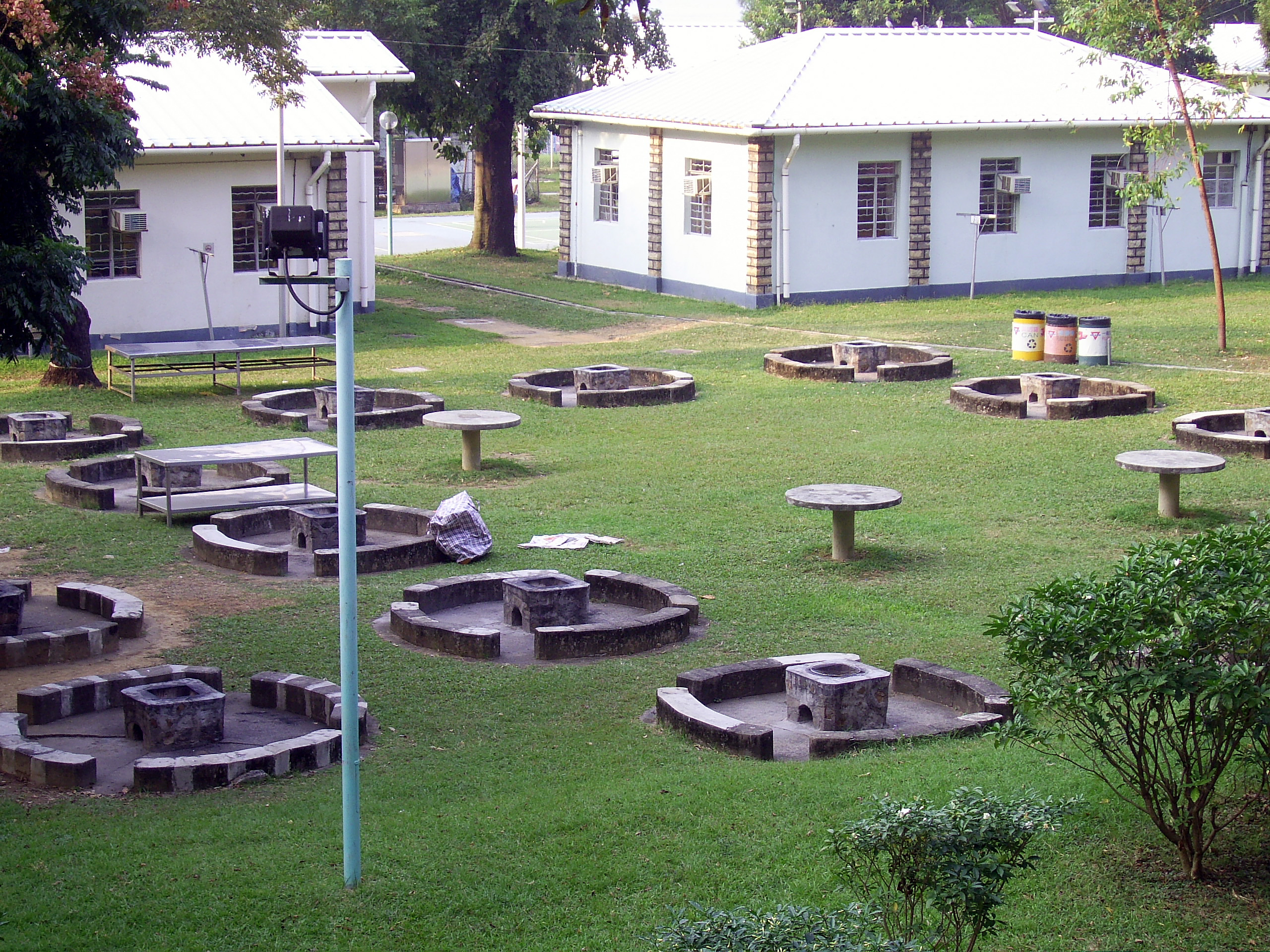
Barbecue area in October 2009
