= Wu Kai Sha (constituency) =

Hong Kong constituency

- Elected constituency for the Sha Tin District Council
- Boundary of Wu Kai Sha in Sha Tin District
- District: Sha Tin
- Legislative Council constituency: New Territories South East
- Population: 20,592 (2019)
- Electorate: 8,766 (2019)

Current constituency
- Created: 2015
- Number of members: One
- Member: Vacant
- Created from: Fu Lung, Lee On, Ma On Shan Town Centre

Wu Kai Sha is one of the 41 constituencies in the Sha Tin District in Hong Kong.

The constituency returns one district councillor to the Sha Tin District Council, with an election every four years.

Wu Kai Sha constituency is loosely based on part of the Villa Athena, Lake Silver, Double Cove and Wu Kai Sha Village in Wu Kai Sha with an estimated population of 20,592.

== Councillors represented ==
Election	Member	Party
2015	Li Wing-shing→Vacant	Democratic→Community Sha Tin
2019	Li Wing-shing→Vacant	Community Sha Tin→Independent

== Election results ==
=== 2010s ===
Sha Tin District Council Election, 2019: Wu Kai Sha
Party	Candidate	Votes	%	±%
Ind. democrat	Li Wing-shing	4,167	60.51	+2.21
DAB	Ng Cheuk-king	2,469	35.86	
Nonpartisan	Anderson Choi Kai-hang	250	3.63	
Majority		1,698	24.65	
Turnout		6,902	78.75	
Ind. democrat hold		Swing		

Sha Tin District Council Election, 2015: Wu Kai Sha
Party	Candidate	Votes	%	±%
Democratic	Li Wing-shing	1,567	58.3	
DAB	Devin Sio Chan-in	1,121	41.7	
Majority		446	15.4	
Turnout		2,731	50.4	
Democratic win (new seat)				
