= Double Cove =

Housing estate in Ma On Shan, Hong Kong

Coordinates: 22.432068°N 114.241160°E

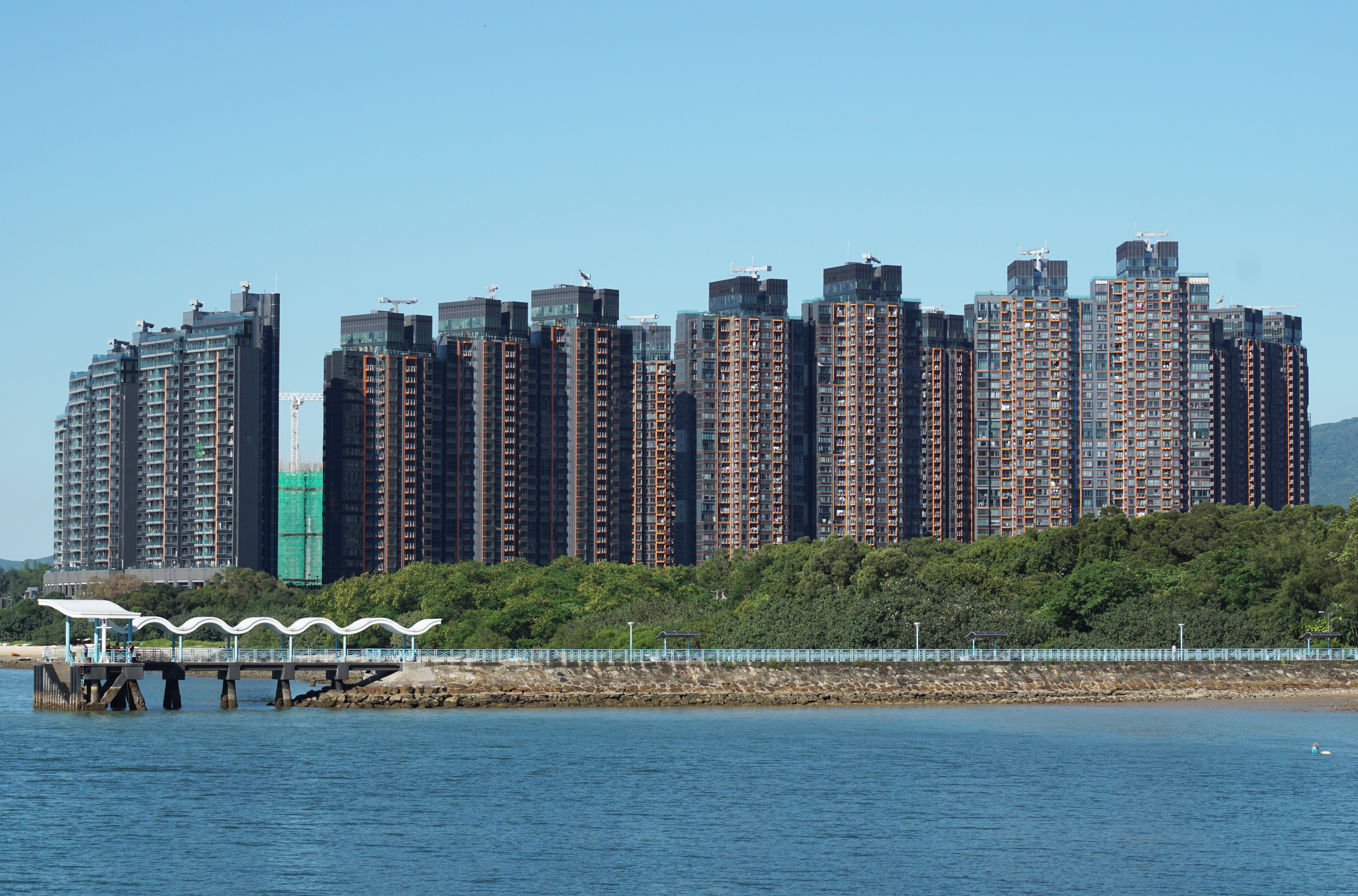
Double Cove.

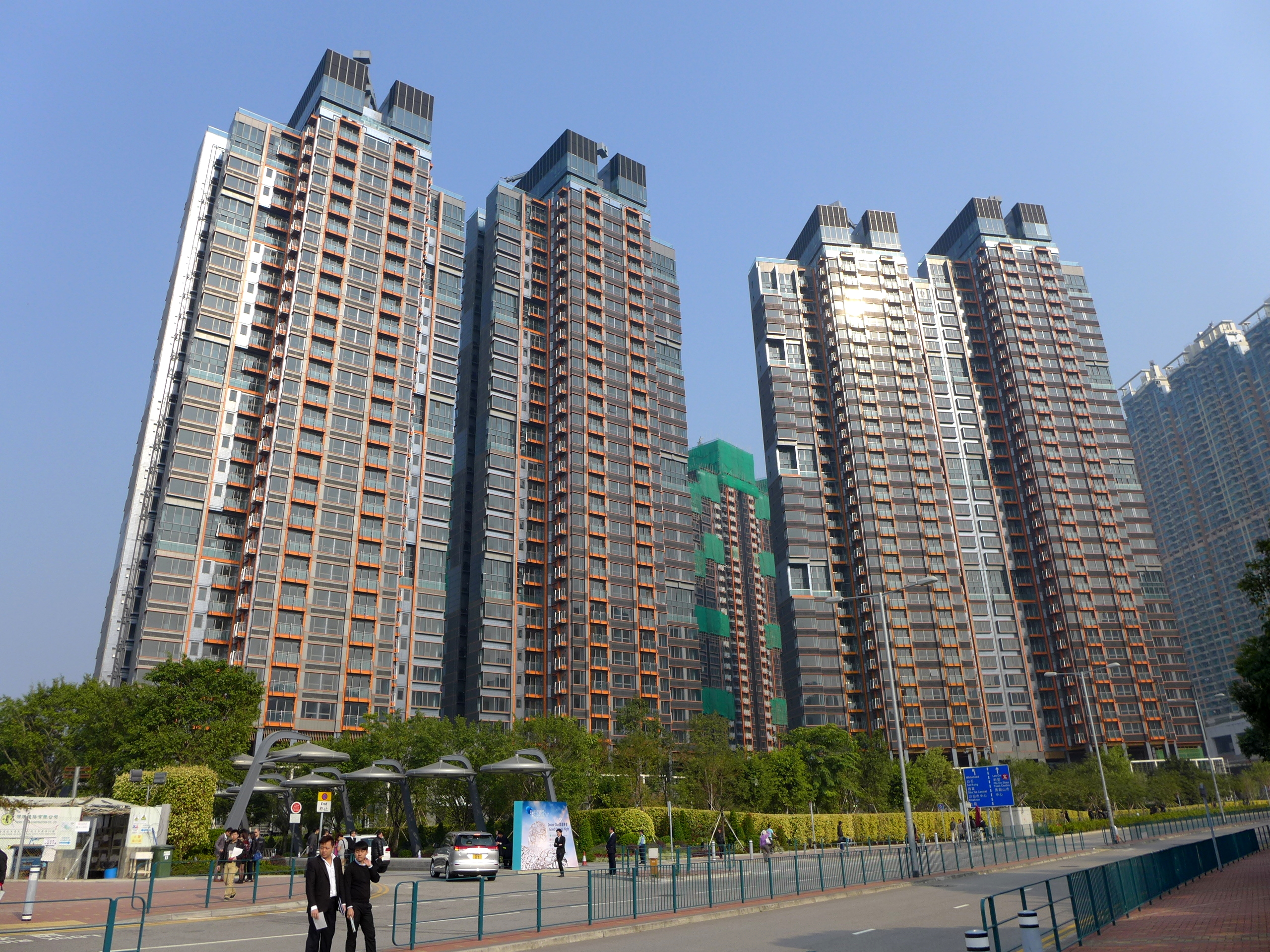
Double Cove.

Double Cove (Chinese: 迎海) is a private housing estate in Wu Kai Sha, Hong Kong near Wu Kai Sha station. It was developed mainly by Henderson Land Development.

== Demographics ==
According to the 2016 by-census, Double Cove had a population of 5,699. The median age was 37.1 and the majority of residents (89.5 per cent) were of Chinese ethnicity. The average household size was 2.8 people. The median monthly household income of all households (i.e. including both economically active and inactive households) was HK$64,160.

== Politics ==
Double Cove is located in Wu Kai Sha constituency of the Sha Tin District Council. It was formerly represented by Li Wing-shing, who was elected in the 2019 elections until July 2021.
