= Cato (surname) =

Cato is a surname. Notable people with the surname include:

- Beth Cato (born 1980), American speculative fiction writer and poet
- Bette Cato (1924–1996), American politician
- Bob Cato (1923–1999), American photographer and graphic designer, two-time Grammy Award winner for album covers
- Connie Cato (born 1955), American country music singer
- Cordell Cato (born 1992), Trinidadian footballer
- Daryl Cato (1920–1970), American National Football League player
- Diomedes Cato (1560 to 1565–1618), Italian-born Polish composer
- George Christopher Cato (1814–?), first mayor of Durban, South Africa
- Harry Cato (born 1958), American politician
- John Cato (1926–2011), Australian fine art photographer and teacher
- Kelvin Cato (born 1974), American basketball player
- Lennox Cato (born 1961), British antiques dealer, one of the experts on the British television series Antiques Roadshow
- Leo Cato, Speaker of the House of Representatives of Grenada since 2022
- Louis Cato (born 1985), American musician, bandleader of The Late Show Band
- Lurine Cato, British gospel singer and songwriter
- Milton Cato (1915–1997), first Prime Minister of Saint Vincent and the Grenadines
- Minto Cato (1900–1979), African-American singer and operatic mezzo-soprano
- Molly Scott Cato (born 1963), British politician and economist
- Nancy Cato (1917–2000), Australian writer
- Noah Cato (born 1988), English rugby union player
- Rakeem Cato (born 1992), American football player
- Roland Cato (born 1997), Grenadian cricketer
- Sam Cato (born 1992), English former first-class cricketer
- Suzy Cato (born 1968), New Zealand entertainer
