= Cheung Kang =

Village in New Territories, Hong Kong

Coordinates: 22.429243°N 114.236861°E

Cheung Kang (Chinese: 長庚) is a village in Wu Kai Sha, Ma On Shan, Sha Tin District, New Territories, Hong Kong.

== Recognised status ==
Wu Kai Sha (including Cheung Kang) is a recognised village under the New Territories Small House Policy.

== Features ==
A 15-metre-high (49-foot) cinnamomum camphora tree in Cheung Kang is listed on the Development Bureau's Register of Old and Valuable Trees.
