= Kato (name) =

Kato is both a given name and a surname. Notable people with the name include:

== People with the given name ==
- Kato Khandwala (died 2018), American record producer and audio engineer
- Kató Lomb, Hungarian interpreter
- Kato Serwanga (born 1976), American football player
- Kato Kaelin, an American radio and television personality

== People with the surname ==
- Ameril Umbra Kato, Filipino fighter
- David Kato, Ugandan activist
- Moriyuki Kato (加戸 守行; 1934–2020), Japanese politician
- Satori Kato (born 1847), Japanese inventor of instant coffee
- Sergio Kato (born 1960), Brazilian-American actor

== Fictional characters ==
- Hikaru Katō, Star Trek character
- Kato Fransen, the main character of the fourth season of the Belgian series wtFOCK.
- Kato Hoeven, the victim in the Belgian noir TV series Beau Séjour

== See also ==
- Cato (disambiguation)
