= Alanus University of Arts and Social Sciences =

Art school in Alfter, Germany

Coordinates: 50°43′57″N 6°59′58″E

- Alanus Hochschule für Kunst und Gesellschaft
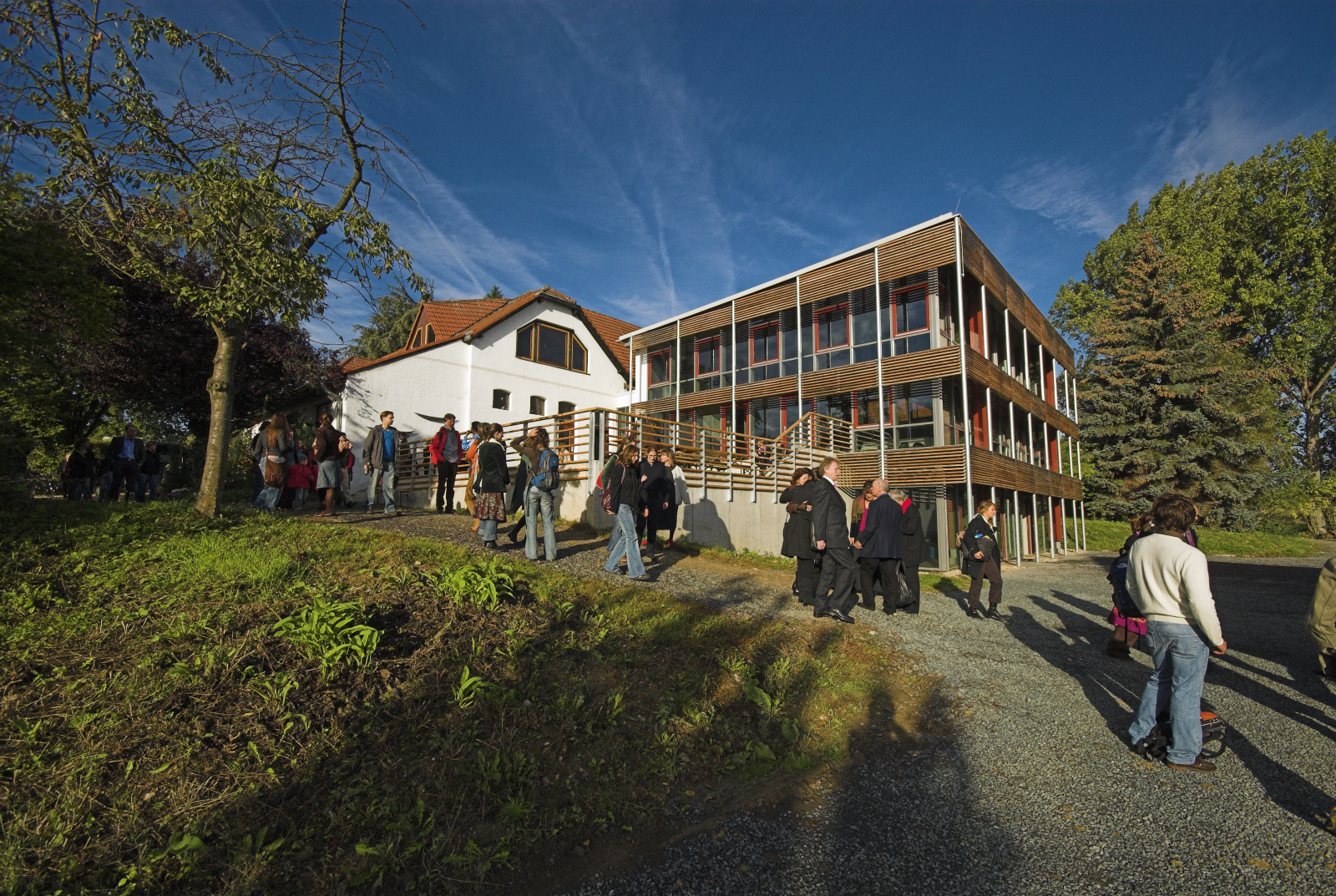
- Campus I
- Type: Private university
- Established: 1973
- Rector: Hans-Joachim Pieper
- Academic staff: 200
- Students: 1536
- Location: Alfter, Germany
- Website: www.alanus.edu

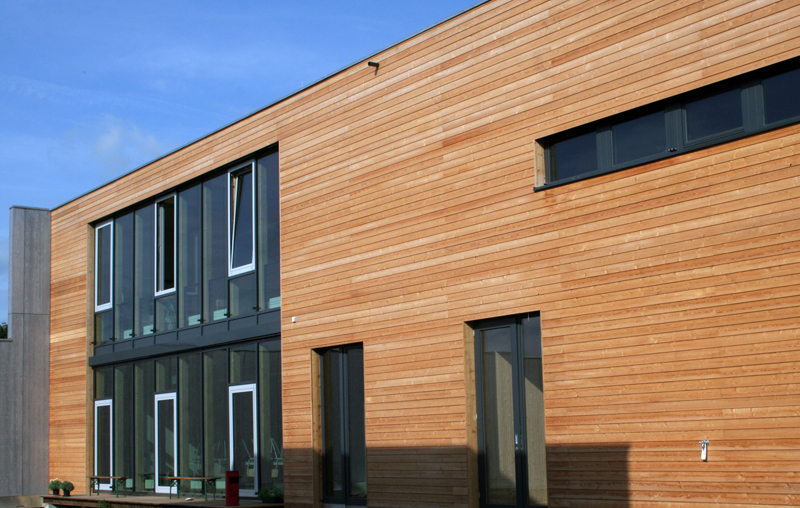
Campus II

Alanus University of Arts and Social Sciences (Alanus Hochschule für Kunst und Gesellschaft) is a state-accredited private university in Alfter (near Bonn), Germany, providing education in the arts and social sciences up to doctorate level. It has offered accredited arts degrees since 2003 and other degrees since 2006. In 2010, the university was awarded institutional accreditation and the right to award doctorates by the German Council of Science and Humanities.

The university was founded as an anthroposophical art school in 1973. In cooperation with Rudolf Steiner University College, it publishes the international academic journal Research on Steiner Education.
