= Cato Alexander =

American bartender

- Born: Cato Alexander c. 1780; New York City, New York, U.S.
- Died: 1858 (aged 77–78)

Cato Alexander (c. 1780–1858) was a freedman and bartender. He was born a slave in New York, where he was forced to work in an inn, frequently waiting on George Washington. After gaining his freedom in 1799, he continued to work in hotels and inns, before opening his own bar, Cato's Tavern, located on what is now the site of 2nd Avenue, 54th Street in Manhattan. Famed Irish actor Tyrone Power considered him "foremost amongst cullers of mint ... for julep" and "second to no man as a compounder of cock-tail." He was known for his expertise in crafting punches as well. The New York Post published a poem in celebration of his wedding.

Alexander's tavern closed in the 1840s, following a series of bad loans to his customers. He briefly opened a smaller restaurant, which lasted only a year.

Some cocktail historians consider him to be "America's first celebrity bartender."
