= Sam Cato =

English cricketer (born 1992)

Personal information
- Full name: Samuel John Cato
- Born: 23 November 1992 (age 33); Chiswick, London, England
- Height: 6 ft 0 in (1.83 m)
- Batting: Right-handed
- Bowling: Right-arm off break

Domestic team information
- Years: Team
- 2013–2015: Oxford University

Career statistics
Competition	First-class
Matches	3
Runs scored	100
Batting average	33.33
100s/50s	–/–
Top score	33
Balls bowled	421
Wickets	4
Bowling average	34.75
5 wickets in innings	–
10 wickets in match	–
Best bowling	2/43
Catches/stumpings	1/–
- Source: Cricinfo, 16 February 2020

Samuel John Cato (born 23 November 1992) is an English former first-class cricketer.

== Early life and career ==
Cato was born at Chiswick in November 1992. He was educated at St Paul's School, before going up New College, Oxford. While studying at Oxford, Cato made three first-class appearances in The University Match for Oxford University between 2013 and 2015. He scored exactly 100 runs in his three matches, with a high score of 33, in addition to taking 4 wickets with best figures of 2 for 43.
