= Juan Giambruno =

Uruguayan cardiac surgeon

Uruguayan scientists testing the CATO in a calf

Dr. Juan Giambruno (born February 23, 1950, in Montevideo) is a Uruguayan cardiac surgeon at Universidad de la República, Montevideo.

His major work is a fully implantable artificial heart called CATO (Corazón Artificial Total Ortotópico - Spanish for Orthotopic Total Artificial Heart), which looks and acts like a real heart. In the development of the CATO, Giambruno worked together with an important team of Uruguayan scientists (cardiac surgeons, engineers, veterinarians and others). The CATO has been tested in cows with good results. Giambruno has earned international patents for his invention. The main factor why the project hasn't been completed yet is the lack of economic resources. For years, the team of scientists has been working very hard and for free, in the living room of Giambruno's apartment in Montevideo.
