= Cato Township, Michigan =

- Township
- Location within Michigan Location within the United States
- Coordinates: 43°26′35″N 85°15′53″W
- Country: United States
- State: Michigan
- County: Montcalm

Area
  - Total: 36.01 sq mi (93.3 km^{2})
  - Land: 35.16 sq mi (91.1 km^{2})
  - Water: 0.85 sq mi (2.2 km^{2})
- Elevation: 955 ft (291 m)

Population (2020)
  - Total: 2,898
  - Density: 82.4/sq mi (31.8/km^{2})
- Time zone: UTC-5 (Eastern (EST))
  - Summer (DST): UTC-4 (EDT)
- ZIP Codes: 48850 (Lakeview); 48886 (Six Lakes)
- FIPS code: 26-117-14000
- GNIS feature ID: 1626045

Cato Township is a civil township of Montcalm County in the U.S. state of Michigan. The population was 2,898 at the 2020 census.

== History ==
Cato Township was established in 1857.

== Communities ==
- Bass Beach was a resort village platted by George Whitcomb and his wife in 1889.
- Lakeview is a village in the northern part of the township. The Lakeview ZIP Code (48850) serves all but the southeast corner of the township.

== Geography ==
The township is in northern Montcalm County and is bordered to the north by Mecosta County. State highway M-46 crosses the center of the township, leading east to Edmore and west to US 131 in Reynolds Township. M-91 has its northern terminus in Cato Township and leads south to Greenville.

According to the U.S. Census Bureau, the Cato Township has a total area of 36.0 square miles (93 km^{2}), of which 35.2 square miles (91 km^{2}) are land and 0.85 square miles (2.20 km^{2}), or 2.37%, are water. The township is drained to the west by Tamarack Creek, a tributary of the Little Muskegon River, and to the east by tributaries of the Flat River, a south-flowing tributary of the Grand River. Tamarack Lake is in the northern part of the township, partly within the village of Lakeview, and Townline Lake is in the northeast part of the township on the border with Belvidere Township.

== Demographics ==
Historical population
Census	Pop.	Note	%±
1860	191		—
1870	523		173.8%
1880	1,397		167.1%
1890	2,016		44.3%
1900	2,087		3.5%
1910	1,976		−5.3%
1920	1,831		−7.3%
1930	1,621		−11.5%
1940	1,486		−8.3%
1950	1,758		18.3%
1960	1,989		13.1%
1970	2,205		10.9%
1980	2,441		10.7%
1990	2,500		2.4%
2000	2,920		16.8%
2010	2,735		−6.3%
2020	2,898		6.0%
U.S. Decennial Census

As of the census of 2000, there were 2,920 people, 1,073 households, and 789 families residing in the township. The population density was 82.8 inhabitants per square mile (32.0/km^{2}). There were 1,307 housing units at an average density of 37.1 per square mile (14.3/km^{2}). The racial makeup of the township was 96.71% White, 0.17% African American, 0.41% Native American, 0.27% Asian, 0.07% Pacific Islander, 0.65% from other races, and 1.71% from two or more races. Hispanic or Latino of any race were 2.71% of the population.

There were 1,073 households, out of which 34.6% had children under the age of 18 living with them, 58.3% were married couples living together, 10.9% had a female householder with no husband present, and 26.4% were non-families. 22.2% of all households were made up of individuals, and 11.3% had someone living alone who was 65 years of age or older. The average household size was 2.67 and the average family size was 3.07.

In the township the population was spread out, with 28.8% under the age of 18, 7.6% from 18 to 24, 28.4% from 25 to 44, 19.6% from 45 to 64, and 15.6% who were 65 years of age or older. The median age was 36 years. For every 100 females, there were 92.4 males. For every 100 females age 18 and over, there were 90.4 males.

The median income for a household in the township was $35,919, and the median income for a family was $40,625. Males had a median income of $31,304 versus $22,000 for females. The per capita income for the township was $15,495. About 8.7% of families and 11.4% of the population were below the poverty line, including 13.6% of those under age 18 and 10.8% of those age 65 or over.
