= Cato (1807 ship) =

Merchant vessel launched at Kingston in 1807

History

United Kingdom
- Builder: Westerdell & Barnes, Hull
- Launched: 18 November 1807
- Fate: Foundered 11 November 1844

General characteristics
- Tons burthen: 306, or 309, or 315, or 316 (bm)
- Complement: 50
- Armament: 1808:20 × 18&9-pounder guns; 1815:6 × 6-pounder guns

Cato was a merchant vessel launched at Kingston upon Hull in 1807. She was a West Indiaman, a transport ship, and traded across the Atlantic between England and North America. She foundered in November 1841.

== Career ==
Cato first appeared in Lloyd's Register (LR) in 1808.

Year	Master	Owner	Trade	Source
1808	Orton; Hossack	Staniforth	London–West Indies; London–Hayti	LR

Captain John Hossack acquired a letter of marque on 6 December 1808.

Year	Master	Owner	Trade	Source & notes
1810	Archer	Staniforth	London–St Thomas	LR
1815	R. Morton	Pizzie & Co.	London–Antigua	LR
1820	R. Morton	Pizzie & Co.	London–Antigua	LR; large repair 1818
1825	W.Sadler	J.Rowe	Cork transport	LR; large repair 1818 & thorough repair 1823

A gale on 13 January 1828 drove the transport ship Cato, and several other vessels, ashore in Mountbatten Bay. The initial report was that her rudder had been unshipped and that her keel was much damaged, but that it was expected that she would be refloated.

Year	Master	Owner	Trade	Source & notes
1830	R.Moon; C.Crawford	Sope & Co.	Cork	LR; damages repaired 1828
1835	Crossman	Pope	Plymouth–America	LR; large repair 1835

Lloyd's List reported on 22 December 1835 that Cato had arrived at Liverpool from Quebec in a much damaged state.

Year	Master	Owner	Trade	Source & notes
1840	J.Taylor	Pope	Plymouth–America	LR; large repair 1835, damages repaired 1836, and small repairs 1841
1844	J.Taylor	Pope	Plymouth–Quebec	LR; large repair 1835, damages repaired 1836, and small repairs 1841

== Fate ==
On 11 November 1844 her crew, who were rescued, abandoned Cato 600 nautical miles (1,100 km) west south west of the Isles of Scilly. She had become waterlogged as she sailed from Quebec City, to Plymouth. Her entry in LR bears the annotation "Abandoned".
