= Cato Schiøtz =

Norwegian barrister (born 1948)

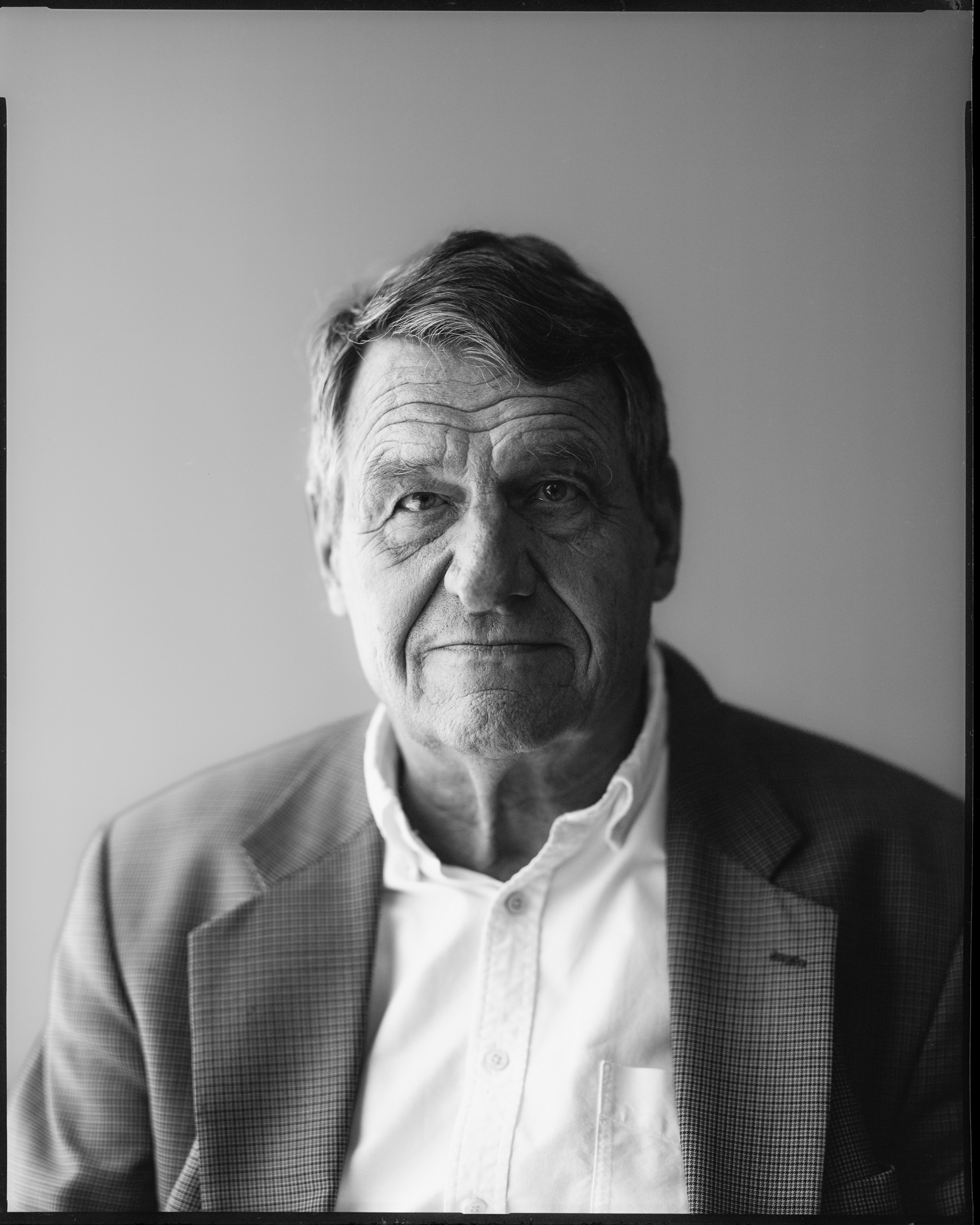
Cato Schiøtz, 2025. Photo: Bjørn Joachimsen

Cato Schiøtz (born 26 July 1948) is a Norwegian barrister.

He was born in Oslo. He worked as a lecturer at the University of Oslo from 1975 to 1978, and also as a deputy judge in Sør-Gudbrandsdal before being hired in the law firm Schjødt in 1978. He became a partner in the firm in 1983. After 40 years, in 2018 he moved on to the law firm Glittertind.

Schiøtz has also been active in the Liberal Party and is a well-known cultural figure in Norway, both as an anthroposophist and a member of the Bibliophile Club.
