= KaitO =

- Origin: England
- Genres: Indie rock
- Years active: 1996–2006
- Labels: Fierce Panda; Devil in the Woods; SpinART; Blast First
- Past members: Nikki Colk; Gemma Cullingford; Dave Lake; Dieta Quantrill

KaitO was an English indie rock band from Norwich, formed in 1996. Their music consisted of loud, pop-punk melodies combined with a unique mix of guitar effects. The band split up in 2006.

== History ==
The band was formed in 1996, and after five years in which they released three singles on small labels, the signed a European deal with Fierce Panda and an American deal with Devil in the Woods in 2001. They played mostly in England, but also toured the United States on many occasions.

The band's debut album was released in August 2001 on the Devil in the Woods label, entitled You've Seen Us..You Must Have Seen Us.... This was quickly followed up with a single, "Cat Nap", on the Fierce Panda label, while British music critics praised KaitO's unique punky sound.

2002 began with tours for the band, most notably with the Datsuns, Seafood and Imperial Teen. An EP was released (Montigola Underground) that summer despite the touring, and KaitO eventually left Devil in the Woods for SpinART in 2003. Their album Band Red was released in May 2003. The band performed at the South by Southwest festival in the same year. The band's final release was a self-titled EP on Blast First in 2003. In 2006, Kaito broke up.

== Post break-up ==
Colk later joined Factory Floor.

Cullingford became the co-founder of the Norwich Ukulele Society, and a ukulele instructor. In 2015 she formed new band Sink Ya Teeth, who released albums in 2018 and 2020. Since 2021 she released music solo under her own name, including 2021 album, Let Me Speak.

Lake later played as guitarist in the Norwich-based band Magoo.

== Musical style ==
The band's sound has been described as "scathing bubblegum pop", and "tightly coiled post-punk-pop". They have been compared to Elastica, Sonic Youth, Wire, PiL, and Sleater Kinney.

== Members ==
- Nikki Colk (vocals, guitar)
- Gemma Cullingford (bass guitar)
- Dave Lake (guitar)
- Dieta Quantrill (drums)

== Discography ==
=== Albums ===
- You've Seen Us..You Must Have Seen Us... (2001), Devil in the Woods
- Band Red (2003), SpinART/Mute

=== Singles and EPs ===
- "Who'ee Owee" (1997), Vibrations From The Edge of Sanity
- "60 Second Popstar" (1998), Vibrations From The Edge of Sanity
- "Go" (2000), Sickroom Gramophonic Collective
- "Cat Nap" (2001), Fierce Panda
- Montigola Underground EP (2001), Future Farmer
- Kaito EP (2003), Blast First
