= HMS Cato =

Three vessels named HMS Cato or Cato have served the Royal Navy:

- HMS Cato (1782) was a 50-gun Grampus-class fourth rate that disappeared, presumed to have foundered, circa January 1783.
- RFA Cato (1914) was launched on 5 May 1914, by Campbeltown Shipbuilding, Campbeltown for Bristol Steam Navigation. She was requisitioned as a store carrier on 4 November 1914, for the Royal Fleet Auxiliary. She sank on 3 March 1940, after having struck a mine that the German submarine U-29 had laid in the Bristol Channel (51.42°N 03.33°W).
- HMS Cato (J16) was a minesweeper launched on 7 September 1942, by Associated Shipbuilders, of Seattle, Washington, United States. She was transferred to the Royal Navy on 28 July 1943, under Lend Lease. A German Neger human torpedo sank her on 6 July 1944, off Normandy.
