= Bushnell Township, Michigan =

- Township
- Location within Michigan Location within the United States
- Coordinates: 43°9′34″N 85°0′36″W
- Country: United States
- State: Michigan
- County: Montcalm

Area
  - Total: 35.75 sq mi (92.6 km^{2})
  - Land: 35.59 sq mi (92.2 km^{2})
  - Water: 0.16 sq mi (0.41 km^{2})
- Elevation: 797 ft (243 m)

Population (2020)
  - Total: 1,516
  - Density: 42.6/sq mi (16.4/km^{2})
- Time zone: UTC-5 (Eastern (EST))
  - Summer (DST): UTC-4 (EDT)
- ZIP Codes: 48834 (Fenwick); 48884 (Sheridan); 48845 (Hubbardston)
- FIPS code: 26-117-12120
- GNIS feature ID: 1626012
- Website: bushnelltownship.com

Bushnell Township is a civil township of Montcalm County in the U.S. state of Michigan. As of the 2020 census, the township population was 1,516.

== History ==
Bushnell Township was organized in 1850.

== Communities ==
- Dean's Mills began around a sawmill in 1865. It had a post office from 1872 until 1877.

== Geography ==
The township is in southeastern Montcalm County and is bordered to the south by Ionia County. The southeast part of the village of Sheridan is in the northwest corner of the township. State highway M-57 crosses the northern part of the township, leading west to Greenville and east to Carson City, while M-66 runs along the western border of the township, leading north to Stanton, the county seat, and south to Ionia.

According to the U.S. Census Bureau, the township has a total area of 35.7 square miles (92 km^{2}), of which 35.6 square miles (92 km^{2}) are land and 0.16 square miles (0.41 km^{2}), or 0.43%, are water. The township is drained by Prairie Creek, which flows north to south across the eastern part of the township. The creek is a tributary of the Grand River leading to Lake Michigan.

== Demographics ==
Historical population
Census	Pop.	Note	%±
1850	66		—
1860	639		868.2%
1870	1,266		98.1%
1880	1,482		17.1%
1890	1,326		−10.5%
1900	1,216		−8.3%
1910	1,178		−3.1%
1920	1,050		−10.9%
1930	890		−15.2%
1940	928		4.3%
1950	932		0.4%
1960	912		−2.1%
1970	1,025		12.4%
1980	1,270		23.9%
1990	1,291		1.7%
2000	2,111		63.5%
2010	1,604		−24.0%
2020	1,516		−5.5%
U.S. Decennial Census

As of the census of 2000, there were 2,111 people, 536 households, and 427 families residing in the township. The population density was 59.3 inhabitants per square mile (22.9/km^{2}). There were 597 housing units at an average density of 16.8 per square mile (6.5/km^{2}). The racial makeup of the township was 82.66% White, 13.69% African American, 0.62% Native American, 0.47% Asian, 0.05% Pacific Islander, 0.66% from other races, and 1.85% from two or more races. Hispanic or Latino of any race were 3.88% of the population.

There were 536 households, out of which 35.6% had children under the age of 18 living with them, 67.5% were married couples living together, 7.5% had a female householder with no husband present, and 20.3% were non-families. 15.5% of all households were made up of individuals, and 5.8% had someone living alone who was 65 years of age or older. The average household size was 2.79 and the average family size was 3.08.

In the township the population was spread out, with 20.3% under the age of 18, 8.1% from 18 to 24, 41.6% from 25 to 44, 23.0% from 45 to 64, and 7.1% who were 65 years of age or older. The median age was 36 years. For every 100 females, there were 184.9 males. For every 100 females age 18 and over, there were 213.4 males.

The median income for a household in the township was $35,573, and the median income for a family was $38,550. Males had a median income of $31,140 versus $22,375 for females. The per capita income for the township was $13,376. About 9.2% of families and 14.6% of the population were below the poverty line, including 20.5% of those under age 18 and 10.1% of those age 65 or over.
