= Bloomer Township, Michigan =

- Township
- Location within Michigan Location within the United States
- Coordinates: 43°9′53″N 84°52′11″W
- Country: United States
- State: Michigan
- County: Montcalm

Area
  - Total: 34.80 sq mi (90.1 km^{2})
  - Land: 34.67 sq mi (89.8 km^{2})
  - Water: 0.13 sq mi (0.34 km^{2})
- Elevation: 774 ft (236 m)

Population (2020)
  - Total: 6,352
  - Density: 183.2/sq mi (70.7/km^{2})
- Time zone: UTC-5 (Eastern (EST))
  - Summer (DST): UTC-4 (EDT)
- ZIP Codes: 48811 (Carson City); 48884 (Sheridan); 48834 (Fenwick); 48845 (Hubbardston)
- FIPS code: 26-117-09040
- GNIS feature ID: 1625949
- Website: bloomertownship.org

Bloomer Township is a civil township of Montcalm County in the U.S. state of Michigan. As of the 2020 census, the township population was 6,352, up from a population of 3,904 in the 2010 census.

== History ==
Bloomer Township was organized in 1852.

== Geography ==
The township is in the southeast corner of Montcalm County, bordered to the east by Carson City and Gratiot County. Ionia County is to the south, and Clinton County borders the southeast corner of the township. It is about 20 miles (32 km) east of Greenville, Montcalm County's largest city. The Carson City Correctional Facility, with a capacity for 2,526 prisoners, is in the eastern part of the township.

According to the U.S. Census Bureau, the township has a total area of 34.8 square miles (90 km^{2}), of which 0.1 square miles (0.3 km^{2}), or 0.38%, are water. Fish Creek, a tributary of the Maple River and part of the Grand River watershed, flows north to south across the east side of the township.

== Demographics ==
Historical population
Census	Pop.	Note	%±
1860	628		—
1870	1,422		126.4%
1880	2,074		45.9%
1890	2,182		5.2%
1900	2,254		3.3%
1910	2,040		−9.5%
1920	2,077		1.8%
1930	1,945		−6.4%
1940	2,096		7.8%
1950	2,152		2.7%
1960	2,263		5.2%
1970	1,152		−49.1%
1980	1,226		6.4%
1990	2,922		138.3%
2000	3,039		4.0%
2010	3,904		28.5%
2020	6,352		62.7%
U.S. Decennial Census

As of the census of 2000, there were 3,039 people, 487 households, and 393 families residing in the township. The population density was 86.3 inhabitants per square mile (33.3/km^{2}). There were 520 housing units at an average density of 14.8 per square mile (5.7/km^{2}). The racial makeup of the township was 66.01% White, 28.36% African American, 1.18% Native American, 0.33% Asian, 0.76% from other races, and 3.36% from two or more races. Hispanic or Latino of any race were 4.11% of the population.

There were 487 households, out of which 40.9% had children under the age of 18 living with them, 66.3% were married couples living together, 9.9% had a female householder with no husband present, and 19.1% were non-families. 16.8% of all households were made up of individuals, and 9.4% had someone living alone who was 65 years of age or older. The average household size was 2.94 and the average family size was 3.26.

In the township the population was spread out, with 15.4% under the age of 18, 12.0% from 18 to 24, 49.0% from 25 to 44, 17.5% from 45 to 64, and 6.2% who were 65 years of age or older. The median age was 34 years. For every 100 females, there were 318.6 males. For every 100 females age 18 and over, there were 409.1 males.

The median income for a household in the township was $36,488, and the median income for a family was $40,000. Males had a median income of $37,292 versus $22,350 for females. The per capita income for the township was $11,351. About 11.8% of families and 15.8% of the population were below the poverty line, including 23.9% of those under age 18 and 7.1% of those age 65 or over.
