= Mayes Airport =

- IATA: none; ICAO: none; FAA LID: ~~47G~~

Summary
- Airport type: Public use
- Owner: Ruby Mayes
- Serves: Carson City, Michigan
- Elevation AMSL: 790 ft / 241 m
- Coordinates: 43°14′27″N 084°52′48″W
- Interactive map of Mayes Airport

Runways
Direction	Length		Surface
Direction	ft	m	Surface
10/28	2,300	701	Turf
18/36	2,200	671	Turf

Statistics (2005)
- Aircraft operations: 248
- Based aircraft: 6
- Sources: FAA Michigan Airport Directory

Mayes Airport (FAA LID: ~~47G~~) was a privately owned, public use airport located four nautical miles (7 km) north-northwest of the central business district of Carson City, in Montcalm County, Michigan, United States. Although an exact date is not known, it is believed the airport closed sometime in 2008.

== Facilities and aircraft ==
Mayes Airport covered an area of 40 acres (16 ha) at an elevation of 790 feet (241 m) above mean sea level. It had two runways with turf surfaces: 10/28 was 2,300 by 100 feet (701 x 30 m) and 18/36 was 2,200 by 100 feet (671 x 30 m) with an turf surface.

For the 12-month period ending December 31, 2005, the airport had 248 general aviation aircraft operations, an average of 20 per month. At that time there were six aircraft based at this airport, all single-engine.
