= John Logan (poet) =

American poet and teacher (1923–1987)

John B. Logan (born January 23, 1923, Red Oak, Iowa – died November 6, 1987, San Francisco, California) was an American poet and teacher.

Logan was born in Red Oak, Iowa. He earned a bachelor's degree from Coe College, his master's degree from the Iowa University, and did graduate work at Georgetown University and the University of Notre Dame in philosophy.

He authored over 14 books of poetry and essays including Spring of the Thief (1963) and Only the Dreamer Can Change the Dream, which won the Lenore Marshall Poetry Prize in 1982. The poet Hayden Carruth has written that Logan was responsible for "creating a new lyricism" through his poetry.

Logan taught at many colleges and universities including Saint John's College in Annapolis, University of Notre Dame, Saint Mary's College in California, and, finally at the State University of New York, Buffalo. His many students include the poets Marvin Bell and Bill Knott.

He was the poetry editor for The Nation and Critic. He also founded and co-edited Choice.

Logan died on November 6, 1987, in San Francisco, CA.

== Honors ==
- Rockefeller Foundation grant
- Morton Dauwen Zabel Award
- 1979 Guggenheim Fellowship
- 1981 Lenore Marshall/Nation Poetry Prize.
- Wayne State University's Miles Modern Poetry Prize

== Bibliography ==
=== Poetry ===
- A Cycle for Mother Cabrini, (1955)
- Ghosts of the Heart, (1960)
- Spring of the Thief: Poems 1960-1962, (1963)
- The Anonymous Lover: New Poems, W. W. Norton & Company, 1973, ISBN 978-87-14-00847-5
- The Zig Zag Walk: Poems 1963-1968, (1973)
- Poem In Progress, (1975)
- The Bridge of Change: Poems 1974-1980, (1979)
- Only the Dreamer Can Change the Dream: Selected Poems, (1981)
- The Transformation: Poems January to March 1981, (1983)
- John Logan: The Collected Poems, BOA Editions, Ltd., 1989, ISBN 978-0-918526-65-6

=== Prose ===
- The House That Jack Built: or, A Portrait of the Artist as a Sensualist, (1974)
- China, Old and New, (1982)
- A Ballet for the Ear: Interviews, Essays, and Reviews, (1983)
- John Logan: The Collected Fiction, (1991)

== Reviews ==
FEW of the American poets now in their 50s have placed the personal, the psychological, as squarely at the center of their work as the preceding generation, that of Lowell and Berryman, did. John Logan -three decades of whose work are brought together in these two books - is one of the few.
