= Sheridan, Michigan =

- Village
- Location in Montcalm County and the state of Michigan
- Coordinates: 43°12′31″N 85°04′26″W
- Country: United States
- State: Michigan
- County: Montcalm
- Townships: Bushnell, Evergreen, Fairplain, Sidney

Area
  - Total: 1.16 sq mi (3.00 km^{2})
  - Land: 1.10 sq mi (2.85 km^{2})
  - Water: 0.058 sq mi (0.15 km^{2})
- Elevation: 843 ft (257 m)

Population (2020)
  - Total: 692
  - Density: 629/sq mi (242.7/km^{2})
- Time zone: UTC-5 (Eastern (EST))
  - Summer (DST): UTC-4 (EDT)
- ZIP code: 48884
- Area code: 989
- FIPS code: 26-73100
- GNIS feature ID: 2399801
- Website: villageofsheridan.com

Sheridan is a village in Montcalm County in the U.S. state of Michigan. The population was 692 at the 2020 census, up from 649 in 2010. The village is located at the corners of four townships and incorporates land from each: Evergreen Township to the northeast, Bushnell Township to the southeast, Fairplain Township to the southwest, and Sidney Township to the northwest.

== History ==
In 1851, Louis Lovell recorded an entry for land here and John W. Winsor built the first business, a sawmill. A shingle-mill owner, Erastus P. Brown, became the first postmaster here on October 14, 1864. It was a station on the Toledo, Saginaw and Muskegon Railway. Sheridan incorporated as a village in 1877 and was named for Union Civil War General Philip Sheridan.

== Geography ==
Sheridan is in southern Montcalm County, along state highway M-66, which leads north 6 miles (10 km) to Stanton, the county seat. Greenville, the largest city in the county, is 11 miles (18 km) to the west-southwest.

According to the U.S. Census Bureau, Sheridan has a total area of 1.16 square miles (3.00 km^{2}), of which 1.10 square miles (2.85 km^{2}) are land and 0.06 square miles (0.16 km^{2}), or 5.00%, are water. Pearl Lake is in the western part of the village.

The Sheridan post office, with ZIP code 48884, also serves portions of the four surrounding townships: Evergreen Township to the northeast, Bushnell Township to the southeast, Fairplain Township to the southwest, and Sidney Township to the northwest, as well as part of Crystal Township to the east of Evergreen, Bloomer Township to the east of Bushnell, and Montcalm Township to the west of Sidney.

== Demographics ==
Historical population
Census	Pop.	Note	%±
1880	661		—
1900	437		—
1910	436		−0.2%
1920	489		12.2%
1930	530		8.4%
1940	542		2.3%
1950	535		−1.3%
1960	606		13.3%
1970	653		7.8%
1980	664		1.7%
1990	730		9.9%
2000	705		−3.4%
2010	649		−7.9%
2020	692		6.6%
U.S. Decennial Census

=== 2010 census ===
As of the census of 2010, there were 649 people, 277 households, and 186 families residing in the village. The population density was 590.0 inhabitants per square mile (227.8/km^{2}). There were 308 housing units at an average density of 280.0 per square mile (108.1/km^{2}). The racial makeup of the village was 95.2% White, 0.6% African American, 1.8% Native American, 0.5% Asian, 0.2% from other races, and 1.7% from two or more races. Hispanic or Latino of any race were 1.7% of the population.

There were 277 households, of which 29.2% had children under the age of 18 living with them, 49.8% were married couples living together, 13.7% had a female householder with no husband present, 3.6% had a male householder with no wife present, and 32.9% were non-families. 28.9% of all households were made up of individuals, and 13.4% had someone living alone who was 65 years of age or older. The average household size was 2.34 and the average family size was 2.83.

The median age in the village was 41.9 years. 23.3% of residents were under the age of 18; 7.1% were between the ages of 18 and 24; 23.2% were from 25 to 44; 25.9% were from 45 to 64; and 20.6% were 65 years of age or older. The gender makeup of the village was 46.1% male and 53.9% female.

=== 2000 census ===
As of the census of 2000, there were 705 people, 304 households, and 207 families residing in the village. The population density was 767.1 inhabitants per square mile (296.2/km^{2}). There were 324 housing units at an average density of 352.6 per square mile (136.1/km^{2}). The racial makeup of the village was 97.16% White, 0.99% African American, 0.43% Native American, 0.43% from other races, and 0.99% from two or more races. Hispanic or Latino of any race were 0.99% of the population.

There were 304 households, out of which 29.9% had children under the age of 18 living with them, 50.3% were married couples living together, 12.8% had a female householder with no husband present, and 31.9% were non-families. 28.3% of all households were made up of individuals, and 13.5% had someone living alone who was 65 years of age or older. The average household size was 2.32 and the average family size was 2.81.

In the village, the population was spread out, with 24.7% under the age of 18, 8.8% from 18 to 24, 24.1% from 25 to 44, 24.0% from 45 to 64, and 18.4% who were 65 years of age or older. The median age was 40 years. For every 100 females, there were 89.5 males. For every 100 females age 18 and over, there were 88.3 males.

The median income for a household in the village was $30,556, and the median income for a family was $40,536. Males had a median income of $31,167 versus $22,125 for females. The per capita income for the village was $16,781. About 7.8% of families and 9.6% of the population were below the poverty line, including 4.1% of those under age 18 and 12.4% of those age 65 or over.

Sheridan water tower, with the painting of the old tower on it

== Landmark ==
Sheridan was formerly known for its historic water tower. The importance of the water tower was so significant that, when it was demolished in recent years, the village chose to paint an image of the historic water tower on the new one.
