= Michigan Murders =

Series of homicides in the U.S. state of Michigan

- Police diagram released to the media June 10, 1969, depicting the locations of the first five victims linked to the Michigan Murderer
- Motive: Sexual gratification; sexual sadism; rage; control

Details
- Victims: 7+
- Span of crimes: July 9, 1967 – July 23, 1969
- Country: United States
- States: Michigan: 6 California: 1

The Michigan Murders were a series of highly publicized killings of young women committed between 1967 and 1969 in the Ann Arbor/Ypsilanti area of Michigan by an individual known as the Ypsilanti Ripper, the Michigan Murderer, and the Co-Ed Killer.

All the victims of the Michigan Murderer were young women between the ages of 13 and 21 who were abducted, raped, and extensively bludgeoned prior to their murder before their bodies were discarded within a 15-mile radius of Washtenaw County. The victims were typically murdered by stabbing or strangulation and their bodies were occasionally mutilated after death. Each victim had been menstruating at the time of her death, and investigators strongly believe this fact had invoked an extreme rage into the evident sexual motive of her murderer. The prime suspect, John Norman Chapman (then known as John Norman Collins) was arrested one week after the final murder. He was sentenced to life imprisonment for this final murder attributed to the Michigan Murderer on August 19, 1970, and is currently incarcerated at Carson City Correctional Facility.

Although never tried for the remaining five murders attributed to the Michigan Murderer, or the murder of a sixth girl killed in California whose death has been linked to the series, investigators believe Collins to be responsible for all seven murders linked to the same perpetrator.

== Murders ==
=== First known victim ===
The first known victim linked to the Michigan Murderer was a 19-year-old Eastern Michigan University (EMU) accounting student named Mary Terese Fleszar, who was last seen by a neighbor walking towards her Ypsilanti apartment at approximately 9 p.m. on July 9, 1967. This neighbor twice observed a young man in a blue-grey Chevrolet slow to a halt beside Fleszar and begin talking to her; each time, Fleszar had shaken her head and walked away from the car. Fleszar was reported missing by her parents the following day, after they learned from her roommate that she had failed to return home the previous evening. Her nude body was found by two 15-year-old boys near an abandoned farmhouse in Superior Township on August 7, and was formally identified via dental records the following day.

The corpse was badly decomposed, although the pathologist who examined Fleszar's remains was able to determine she had been stabbed approximately thirty times in the chest and abdomen with a knife or other sharp object, that her feet had been severed just above the ankle, the thumb and sections of the fingers of one hand were missing, and that one forearm had been severed from her body (the severed appendages were never found). Despite the advanced state of decomposition, the pathologist was also able to locate multiple linear abrasions upon the victim's chest and torso, indicating that Fleszar had been extensively beaten before her death. Although police theorized that Fleszar had been raped, the advanced state of decomposition of the corpse had erased any conclusive evidence of sexual assault.

A detailed examination of the crime scene revealed that the body had been moved three times throughout the month it had lain undiscovered. Initially, the body had been placed upon a pile of bottles and cans obscured from view by elder trees before being dragged five feet from this location into a field, where it had remained exposed throughout much of the time it had lain undiscovered. Shortly before the body was discovered, the murderer had again returned to the body, which he had moved a further three feet.

Two days after the formal identification of Fleszar's body, a young man claiming to be a friend of the Fleszar family arrived at the funeral home holding Fleszar's body prior to her scheduled burial. This individual asked for permission to take a photograph of the body as it lay in the coffin as a keepsake for her parents. When informed his request was impossible, the young man replied: "You mean you can't fix her up enough so I could just get one picture of her?" Sternly informed a second time he would not be allowed to view the body, the young man—who had not been carrying a camera—wordlessly exited the funeral home.

The receptionist could not offer any clear description of the man beyond that he was a handsome, dark-haired young white male, approximately twenty years old, and that he had driven an old blue-grey Chevrolet.

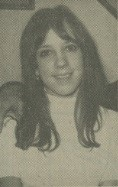
Joan Elspeth Schell

=== Subsequent murders ===
Almost one year later, on July 5, 1968, the mutilated and partially decomposed body of a 20-year-old art student named Joan Elspeth Schell was found by construction workers on an Ann Arbor roadside. She had been raped, then stabbed twenty-five times with a knife estimated to have measured four inches in length. Several of these wounds had punctured her lungs, liver and carotid artery, and one wound inflicted behind her left ear had fractured her skull. In addition, her throat had been slashed, and her miniskirt then tied around her neck. Although Schell had been dead for several days, her entire lower body was in a remarkably preserved condition, whereas her head, shoulders and breasts were in an advanced state of decomposition, leading the pathologist to conclude her body had been stored in a naturally cool environment, but with the upper third of her body exposed to natural heat.

The lack of blood beneath or near the corpse, plus the testimony of eyewitnesses, led investigators to determine Schell's body had lain in its present location for less than twenty-four hours. Her murderer had likely driven to the location to dispose of her body, before evidently making rudimentary efforts to conceal the corpse with clumps of grass. In addition, the "outstanding similarities" between the wounds inflicted upon her body and those inflicted upon Fleszar the previous year led investigators to establish a definite connection between both murders, and four detectives were assigned to work full-time on both cases.

Schell hailed from Plymouth and had recently moved into a house on Emmet Street in Ypsilanti; she was last seen by her roommate, Susan Kolbe, at a Washtenaw Avenue bus stop on the evening of June 30. Schell had intended to travel to Ann Arbor to visit her boyfriend, and her roommate had accompanied her to the bus stop. Kolbe later informed investigators that Schell had informed her of her intentions to hitchhike when it became apparent she had missed the last bus, and that one of the first vehicles to pass when Schell had begun hitchhiking was a red-and-black Pontiac Bonneville containing three young white men. This vehicle had slowed to a stop before the driver had asked her, "Hey, you want a ride?" (Note: Kolbe would inform investigators that shortly after Schell had announced her intentions to hitchhike to her boyfriend's house, this same vehicle had previously slowed as it had passed them as they walked along Cross Street.) The driver had worn a green EMU T-shirt and been aged around 20, approximately 6 feet (1.8 m) tall, clean-cut and with short, dark, side-parted hair.

Kolbe later stated she had attempted to dissuade Schell from entering this vehicle, but that Schell had opted to accept the driver's offer, promising to call her roommate to assure her of her safety once she reached her boyfriend's Ann Arbor residence. Less than three hours later, at 1:47 a.m. on July 1, Kolbe reported her roommate missing after failing to receive any contact.

Despite tracing and eliminating more than 150 registered owners of red-and-black vehicles in the state of Michigan, and establishing the alibis of numerous individuals whose physical features bore a likeness to the composite drawing of the driver the police had obtained from Kolbe, all investigative lines of inquiry into Schell's murder failed to bear fruit. On August 18, investigators announced that all significant leads had been exhausted, and that the number of officers assigned to investigate the case had been reduced. Nonetheless, the inquiry into both murders remained active, and a reward then-totaling $7,800 (equivalent to approximately $72,200 today). for information leading to the conviction of the perpetrator of both homicides remained.

Two months after Schell's murder, police inquiries produced two further eyewitnesses who stated they had observed Schell walking with a young man along Emmet Street on the evening she disappeared. Although neither eyewitness was certain, both believed this student to be John Norman Collins: a student at EMU majoring in elementary education, who lived directly across the street from Schell at 619 Emmet, and whose physical features bore a likeness to the composite drawing police had generated of the driver of the vehicle Schell had entered.

Questioned by police, Collins flatly denied even knowing Schell, and insisted he had spent the weekend of June 29–30 with his mother at her house in the Detroit suburb of Center Line, and had not returned to Ypsilanti until the morning of July 1. Initially, police took him at his word, and did not seek to verify his alibi.

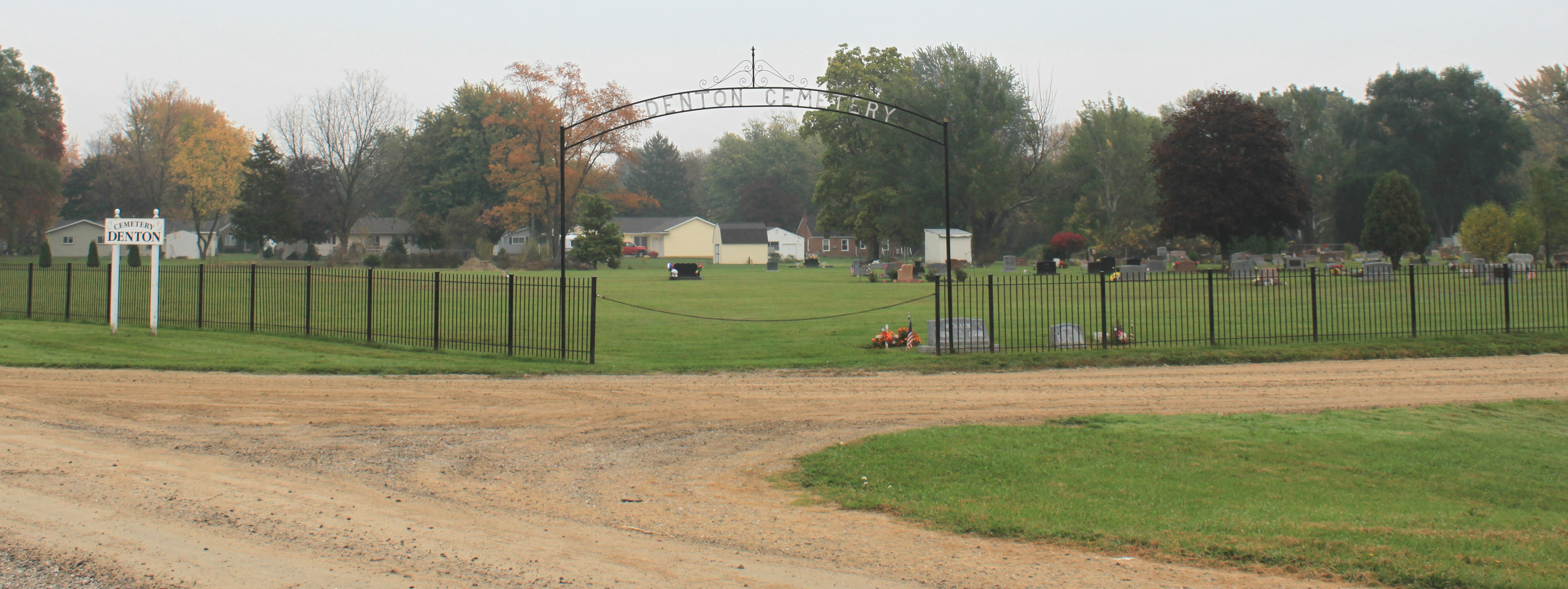
Denton Cemetery. The body of 23-year-old Jane Mixer was found at this location on March 21, 1969.

=== Spring 1969 ===
On March 20, 1969, a 23-year-old University of Michigan (U-M) law student named Jane Louise Mixer disappeared after posting a handwritten note on a college bulletin board seeking a lift from a fellow student across the state to her hometown of Muskegon, where she had intended to inform her family of her engagement and imminent move to New York City. Her fully clothed body, covered with her own raincoat and with a copy of the novel Catch-22 placed by her side, was found early the following morning atop a grave in Denton Cemetery in Van Buren Township. An autopsy revealed Mixer had been shot twice in the head with a .22-caliber pistol, then garroted with a nylon stocking which, the pathologist noted, had not belonged to her. The pathologist also stated that Mixer had not been sexually assaulted, that death had occurred at approximately 3 a.m. on March 21, and that she had not been killed at the location where her body had been discovered.

The note Mixer wrote requesting a lift to Muskegon had read: "Would appreciate hearing from anyone who might be driving to Muskegon or vicinity any time Thursday (3/20/69)" alongside her name, dormitory room number, and telephone number; further inquiries revealed she had attempted to telephone a student named David Johnson at 6:35 p.m., believing he had offered her a ride to Muskegon, although Johnson denied responding to Mixer's bulletin board message, and had a cast iron alibi for the evening in question. Despite the lack of sexual assault, the fact that Mixer's pantyhose had been pulled down to expose her thighs and sanitary napkin suggested a sexual motive behind the murder. Although she had not been beaten, stabbed or mutilated, her student status, the tying of a garment around her neck, and the proximity of her abduction and murder led investigators to tentatively link her murder to those of Fleszar and Schell. (Note: Another individual, Gary Earl Leiterman, would eventually be convicted of Mixer's murder in 2005.)

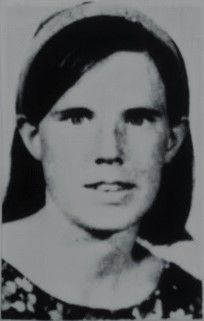
Jane Louise Mixer

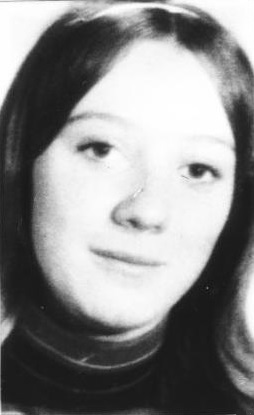
Maralynn Skelton

Four days after the discovery of Mixer's body, on March 25, a surveyor discovered the nude, mutilated body of a teenage girl lying face-upwards on a blue jacket at the top of a wooded knoll behind a vacant house on a remote, rural section of Earhart Road frequently used by U-M students as a lovers' lane. The location was just a few hundred yards from where the body of Joan Schell had been discovered eight months previously, although in this instance the victim had intentionally been discarded in a sexually degrading position. Investigators called to the crime scene noted a dramatic increase in the savagery exhibited against the victim, with one investigator describing the injuries inflicted upon the victim as being the worst he had seen in thirty years of police work. A subsequent autopsy revealed the victim had died of numerous fractures covering one-third of her skull and one side of her face, all of which had been inflicted with a heavy blunt instrument.

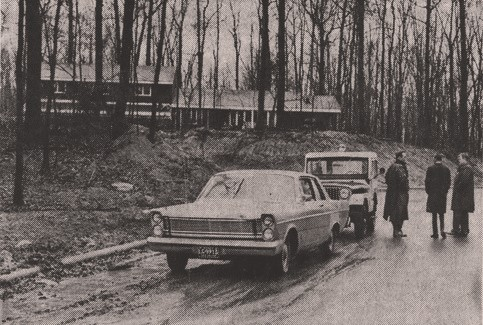
Investigators converge at Earhart Road, Ann Arbor, following the discovery of the body of Maralynn Skelton

The skull and facial fractures had been inflicted after the victim had been extensively beaten and tortured: her killer had placed a section of her own shirt into her trachea to muffle her screams as she received extensive blunt force trauma to the face, head and body, including several deep lacerations believed to have been inflicted with a leather strap. Welt marks upon the chest and shoulders indicated the killer had also used restraints to hold the victim prone as he whipped her torso and upper legs with a leather belt before tearing a branch from a nearby tree and inserting this instrument eight inches into her vagina, causing extensive tearing. Blood spatterings and churned soil close to the crime scene indicated the decedent had been beaten close to where her body was discovered, and that she may have attempted to escape her attacker, although recent heavy rainfall had obliterated any clear footprints or tire tracks her murderer may have left at the scene.

The victim was identified as a 16-year-old Romulus high school student named Maralynn Skelton, who had disappeared while hitchhiking in Ann Arbor. She was last seen alive outside a drive-in restaurant on Washtenaw Avenue two days before her body was discovered (although autopsy reports indicated Skelton had died between twenty-four and thirty-six hours before her body was discovered). Investigators noted strong similarities between this murder and previous killings attributed to the Michigan Murderer, including the fact that a garter belt had been tied around Skelton's neck and her clothes and shoes had been neatly placed beside her body. However, the dramatic increase in savagery exhibited against the victim and the fact that Skelton was a known drug user, dealer and occasional police informant as opposed to a university student led some junior investigators to speculate her murder may have been drug-related. Nonetheless, Ann Arbor Police Chief Walter Krasny formally linked Skelton's murder to the series.

== Formation of coordinated task force ==
Following the March 24 murder of Maralynn Skelton, police from the five separate jurisdictions where the murderer had abducted or disposed of the bodies of his victims formally combined resources in an effort to compare information and identify the perpetrator. Although investigators had informally exchanged information with agencies from other jurisdictions on an irregular basis since the previous summer, no coordination to combine efforts and resources had ensued until the discovery of the third victim definitely linked to the series. By early April, these law enforcement agencies had collectively assigned twenty investigators to work exclusively upon the four homicides.

Little physical evidence existed beyond eyewitness descriptions and forensic reports. Police had noted (and would continue to note) common denominators in the physical characteristics of the victims, and the manner in which they died: all of the victims had been slender, brunette Caucasians; each (excluding Mixer) had been the recipient of extensive violence inflicted with a blunt and/or bladed instrument prior to her murder; each of the victims' bodies had been found within a 15-mile radius of Washtenaw County; and each victim (excluding Mixer) had received knife wounds to the neck. Furthermore, each victim had been found with an item of clothing tied around her neck, and all four victims had been menstruating at the time of her death. These factors led police to publicly conclude the same perpetrator was responsible for at least three of the murders thus far committed.

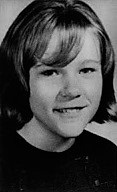
Dawn Louise Basom

=== Fifth and sixth murders ===
At 6:30 a.m. on April 16, the body of a 13-year-old schoolgirl named Dawn Louise Basom was found beside a desolate road in Ypsilanti. Clothed only in a white blouse and bra, which had been pushed up around her neck, she had been repeatedly stabbed in the chest and genitals, had received multiple slash wounds measuring up to eight inches across her breasts, buttocks and stomach, then strangled to death—most likely from behind—with a two-foot length of electrical flex that was left knotted around her neck. A handkerchief found stuffed in her mouth had likely been placed there to muffle her cries throughout her torture, and her murderer had placed her body in a location where rapid discovery was assured. An autopsy revealed Basom had died approximately ten hours before the discovery of her body. Investigators found no definite evidence Basom had been subjected to a sexual assault prior to her murder.

Basom had last been seen alive at 7:30 p.m. the previous evening, walking home from a friend's house located barely a mile from her own home. She had been accompanied part of the way by a friend named Earl Kidd, who informed police he and Basom had parted company at a desolate road just five blocks from her home, where Basom had begun walking alone alongside railroad tracks toward her home. One eyewitness reported seeing the girl at approximately 7:35 p.m., but her movements thereafter were never verified.

An orange mohair sweater belonging to Basom was found in a deserted farmhouse 100 yards from the desolate road on which her body had been placed. Glass particles found within the farmhouse basement were of a similar consistency to those found upon the soles of Basom's shoes. Upon conducting a search of the basement of this farmhouse, investigators discovered a further article of her clothing, a length of electrical flex of the same type used to strangle her, and fresh human bloodstains, indicating that the location was the site of Basom's murder.

One week after the murder of Dawn Basom, a detective conducting a routine examination of the farmhouse basement discovered a scrap of cloth from Basom's blouse, plus a gold earring later determined to belong to Maralynn Skelton. Each item had been deliberately placed in this location, indicating that the murderer had returned to the scene of the crime, and that the two homicides were definitely linked. The farmhouse itself was destroyed in an act of arson on May 13. When the fire was extinguished, five clipped lilac blossoms were found arranged in an even row across the driveway to the building, leading investigators to theorize they had been placed there by the murderer to symbolize each victim.

Less than two months after the murder of Dawn Basom, on June 9, three teenage boys discovered the partially nude body of a young woman in a field close to an abandoned farmhouse on North Territorial Road. The victim had received multiple slash and stab wounds to the body (including two stab wounds which had pierced her heart), and a gunshot wound to the forehead before her neck had been cut through to the spine. The victim's right thumb had also received a gunshot wound, suggesting the woman had raised her hand to protect herself before her killer had fired the gun at point-blank range. She had also been raped, although the pathologist was unable to determine whether this act had occurred before or after death. Pieces of her clothing were scattered around her body, although one of her shoes was missing.

The victim was identified the following day as a 21-year-old U-M graduate student named Alice Elizabeth Kalom, who had disappeared shortly after midnight on the morning of June 8. She was last seen walking towards her apartment on Thompson Street after attending a friend's party. The discovery of several dried bloodstains and two buttons from the victim's raincoat at a Northfield Township commercial gravel pit on June 10 indicated the victim had been murdered at this location. Investigators had publicly claimed prior to Kalom's murder they were satisfied that the third victim initially linked to the Michigan Murderer, Jane Mixer, had been killed by a separate perpetrator; the fact Kalom had also received a gunshot wound to the head led investigators to reconsider the possibility Mixer may have been murdered by the same perpetrator.

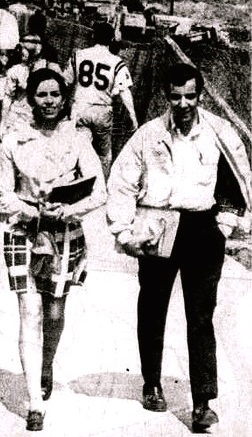
A female EMU student, pictured alongside a trusted male "buddy" in April 1969

=== Public unrest ===
By the spring of 1969, public outcry regarding the murders committed by the individual dubbed by the press as the Michigan Murderer and the Co-Ed Killer was increasing, particularly among the student population of Ann Arbor and Ypsilanti. The increase in frequency in which the killer was striking throughout the spring and summer of 1969, coupled with the fact most victims had been connected to the U-M or EMU, suggesting the killer may be a fellow student, further heightened the concerns of female students. Many female students opted to arm themselves with knives, with others adopting a "buddy system" whereby they would refuse to walk anywhere unless in the company of a trusted male friend or at least three other girls. Sales of tear gas, knives, and security locks increased, hitchhiking became a rarity among students, and the reward offered for information leading to the arrest and conviction of the murderer increased to $42,000 (the equivalent of approximately $369,000 as of 2026).

By July 1969, as a result of the coordinated investigation into the killings, more than 1,000 convicted sex offenders had been investigated and eliminated as suspects, over 800 tips from informants had been investigated, and several thousand individuals had been interviewed. Although Washtenaw County Sheriff Douglas Harvey conceded at a press conference that same month that investigators had little physical evidence to act upon and that the perpetrator had yet to make a serious error, he was adamant that the fact the murderer was still at large was due to pure luck, and not for lack of police effort.

At the request of an Ann Arbor citizen's community, a Dutch psychic named Peter Hurkos traveled to Washtenaw County on July 21 to generate a psychic profile of the murderer. Hurkos accurately predicted that the murderer was a strongly built white male under 25 years of age, who had been born outside the United States, and who rode a motorcycle. Having led investigators to the precise location where each of the victims' bodies had been discovered, Hurkos also revealed details of the murders to investigators which had not been released to the press. Although this information proved to be of little help throughout the actual manhunt, Hurkos also predicted that this individual would shortly strike one final time.

== Final murder ==
The final murder committed by the Michigan Murderer was that of 18-year-old Karen Sue Beineman, an EMU undergraduate student who was last seen alive on July 23, 1969. Beineman was reported missing by her roommate, Sherri Green, at 10 p.m. when she failed to return to her dormitory after curfew. Upon questioning both of Beineman's roommates, police were informed that she (Beineman) had last been seen shortly after noon on her way to a downtown wig shop.

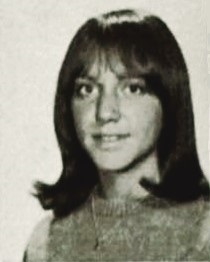
Karen Sue Beineman, seen here in 1968

Three days after Beineman's disappearance, her nude body was discovered face-down in a wooded gully alongside the Huron River parkway. A medical examination revealed Beineman had been extensively beaten about the face, genitalia and body, with some lacerations inflicted being so severe sections of skin had been removed, exposing subcutaneous tissues. She had received extensive skull and brain injuries which had been inflicted with a blunt instrument, had been forced to ingest a caustic substance, and her neck, shoulders, nipples and breasts had been burned with the same caustic agent. As had been the case with previous victims, her killer had placed a section of cloth in her throat to muffle her screams throughout her torture.

Beineman had died of strangulation, although the pathologist noted the blunt force injuries inflicted to her skull and brain had been so extensive they would likely have proven fatal. (Note: The blunt instrument used to inflict these injuries to Beineman's skull and brain was never found.) The forensic examination of Beineman's body further revealed she had been raped prior to her murder, and that her torn panties had been forcefully placed inside her vagina; these panties revealed the presence of human semen and 509 human hair clippings measuring less than three-eighths of an inch upon the material. These hair clippings were predominantly blond, and as such did not belong to the victim, whose own hair color had been dark brown.

Mindful of the fact the killer had evidently returned to sites of several of his previous murders to move the bodies, possibly in a sexual ritual, police theorized he may also attempt to return to this latest crime scene. Although earlier attempts to enforce news blackouts as to the discovery of Basom and Kalom had proven unsuccessful, on this occasion, police successfully ordered a news blackout relating to the discovery of this latest victim. Beineman's body was replaced with that of a tailor's mannequin, and the gully surrounding this mannequin monitored by undercover officers.

At approximately 12:15 a.m. on July 27, in the midst of a heavy, humid storm, one officer observed a young man running from the gully; the heavy rain and insect irritation had prevented the officer from observing the young man actually approaching the gully. Although this officer attempted to radio this sighting to his colleagues, the rain had rendered his radio inoperable.

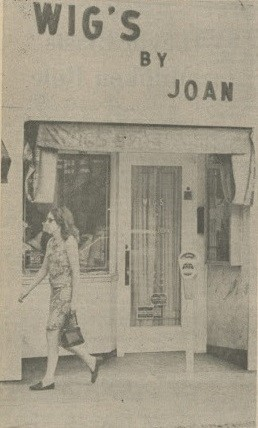
The wig shop at which Karen Sue Beineman was last seen alive on July 23, 1969

=== Investigation ===
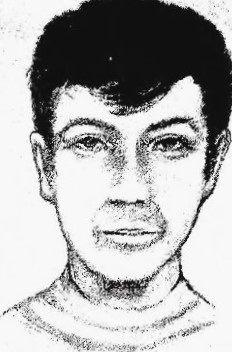
The composite drawing of the individual last seen with Beineman

Upon retracing Beineman's movements on the day of her disappearance, police questioned the proprietor of the Washington Street wig shop she had visited immediately prior to her disappearance, Diana Joan Goshe. Goshe recalled Beineman visiting her store to purchase a $20 hairpiece in the early afternoon of July 23. She also recalled observing a young man with short, side-parted dark hair and wearing a horizontal striped sweater, waiting on a blue motorcycle parked approximately 30 feet (9.1 m) outside the shop as Beineman made her purchase. Reportedly, Beineman had light-heartedly insisted Goshe observe the man with whom she had accepted a ride, stating that she had made two foolish errors in her life: purchasing a wig, and accepting a ride from a stranger. Beineman then stated: "I've got to be either the bravest or the dumbest girl alive, because I've just accepted a ride from this guy." Goshe then observed Beineman climb onto the motorcycle behind the young man before the two drove away.

Although Goshe would initially—and incorrectly—describe the motorcycle as being possibly a Honda 350 model, when police questioned Carol Wieczerca, a clerk in the chocolate store adjacent to the wig shop, Wieczerca was able to state that the model of the motorcycle was actually a Triumph.

The description of the young man with whom Beineman had last been seen alive was heard by a patrolman named Larry Mathewson, who believed the person described by Diana Goshe and others may be John Norman Collins — a former Theta Chi fraternity brother of his who had previously been interviewed but eliminated from police inquiries, and whom Mathewson had himself seen riding his motorcycle around the EMU campus on the afternoon of July 23. When Mathewson questioned Collins on July 25 as to his movements two days earlier, he admitted that on the date in question he had been riding his Triumph Bonneville in the vicinity, and that he had stopped to converse with a former girlfriend of his while doing so (the point at which Mathewson had observed him). This former girlfriend was able to provide Mathewson with two recent photographs of Collins. When Mathewson showed these photographs to both Goshe and her assistant, Patricia Spaulding, both women were adamant the man in the photographs was the same individual with whom Beineman had last been seen alive.

Police had already established that Collins was a known motorcycle enthusiast who owned several motorcycles, including a blue Triumph Bonneville. He held a part-time job as an inspector at a firm which manufactured drum brakes, and was majoring in elementary education at EMU. Prior to enrolling at EMU in the fall of 1966, he had been an honor student and football co-captain at his high school.

John Norman Collins
- Collins, pictured at his arraignment for the murder of Karen Sue Beineman, August 1, 1969
- Born: John Norman Collins; June 17, 1947 (age 79); Windsor, Ontario, Canada
- Height: 6 ft 0 in (183 cm)
- Conviction: First degree murder
- Penalty: Life imprisonment

Details
- Victims: 1–7+
- Span of crimes: July 9, 1967 – July 23, 1969
- Country: United States
- States: Michigan, California (suspected)
- Date apprehended: July 30, 1969
- Imprisoned at: Carson City Correctional Facility

Collins had established a reputation among his peers at EMU as an intelligent individual, but also a habitual thief who had once been evicted from a fraternity house for stealing from his roommates. Some acquaintances noted Collins' politeness around women, while others described him as lascivious, bad-tempered and prone to accuse women of inciting lust within him. He was known to engage in sexual violence, including one instance in which he had raped a woman who had resisted his advances. Moreover, several of these female acquaintances divulged that Collins would become enraged upon learning a woman was menstruating: one woman revealed to police that on one occasion, when Collins had begun groping her breasts, she had informed him she was experiencing her period; in response, Collins had yelled, "That is really disgusting!" before angrily walking out of her apartment. (Note: Investigators had established that each victim had been menstruating at the time of her death, and had theorized this may be a factor in the sexual violence exhibited upon the victims.)

Upon questioning Collins' co-workers, investigators learned that Collins had repeatedly taken delight in describing, in graphic detail, details of the injuries inflicted upon each successive victim linked to the Michigan Murderer to his female colleagues; he had claimed these details had been provided to him by an uncle of his named David Leik, who served as a sergeant in the police force. The injuries described by Collins were consistent with those inflicted upon the victims which had not been disclosed to the news media, and David Leik would inform investigators that he had not disclosed any information regarding the Michigan Murders to his nephew.

If a person wants something, he alone is the deciding factor of whether or not to take it, regardless of what society thinks is right or wrong ... if a person holds a gun on somebody—it's up to him to decide whether to take the other's life or not. The point is: It's not society's judgment that's important, but the individual's own choice of will and intellect.

— Evaluation of individual will and moral restraints within society, written by Collins while enrolled at Eastern Michigan University.

=== Prior connections with victims ===
Investigators also ascertained Collins had either been acquainted with most of the victims, had currently or previously lived close to their place of residence, or had likely established possible contact with the women prior to their murders. In the case of victims Mary Fleszar and Joan Schell, investigators were able to establish he had been a neighbor of both women, and that at the time of Fleszar's disappearance, Collins had actually worked in an office at the EMU located directly opposite the hallway from the office where Fleszar had worked. Through interviewing a recent girlfriend of Collins, investigators also learned that she had lived in an apartment complex directly across the road from the home of Dawn Basom, and that, throughout their courtship, Collins had been a regular visitor to her apartment. As such, he may have become acquainted with Basom during that time.

Shortly after an updated composite drawing of the suspect had been disseminated throughout the media following Beineman's murder, a janitor at a Woodland Hills apartment village also contacted investigators to state an individual matching this description had frequented an apartment adjacent to one Maralynn Skelton had frequently visited in the months prior to her murder. As such, Collins may have also known Skelton—at least by sight—prior to her murder.

=== Suspect identification and questioning ===
Following Diana Goshe's identification of a photograph of Collins, police asked her to identify the man she had seen with Beineman in a police lineup. In this lineup, Goshe positively identified Collins as the man she had seen with Beineman. In total, seven witnesses would be found who would later testify to having seen Collins in the area between the university campus and Mrs. Goshe's wig shop between 11 a.m. and 1 p.m. on July 23, including three young women who stated Collins had attempted to entice them onto his motorcycle. To one of these women, Collins had remarked he did not appreciate women having their ears pierced as piercings "[left] holes that defile their bodies". (Note: Autopsy reports had indicated five of the seven victims linked to the perpetrator, including Beineman, had had their ears pierced.)

On Sunday, July 27, police arrived at the Emmet Street apartment Collins shared with his roommate, Arnold Davis. Although Collins emphatically protested his innocence and insisted the eyewitnesses' identification of him had been an error, he refused to return to the police station to take a polygraph test. The following evening, Davis observed Collins emerging from his bedroom carrying a box partially covered by a blanket. As Davis opened the door for his roommate to leave the apartment, he observed that the contents of this box included a woman's purple leather shoe, rolled-up jean-like material, and a burlap purse. Thirty minutes later, Collins returned to the apartment and informed Davis he had simply decided to "get rid of" the box and its contents.

== Arrest ==
Collins' uncle, State Police Sergeant David Leik, had been on vacation with his family at the time of Beineman's disappearance, and had only returned home on July 29, three days after the discovery of her body. Throughout their vacation, Collins had been temporarily residing in the Leik family's Ypsilanti home, having been granted sole access to the house in order to feed their German Shepherd. Upon their return from their vacation, Leik's wife, Sandra, had noted numerous fresh paint marks covering the floor of the family basement, and that several items—including a bottle of ammonia, a box of laundry detergent, and a canister of black spray paint—were missing from the household.

The same day, Leik was advised by investigators of his nephew's suspect status, and the level of circumstantial evidence unfolding against him. Leik acknowledged that the evidence thus far gathered against his nephew was compelling, although in this first interview, he did not advise officers of the items missing from his household, or the paint marks he and his wife had found upon the floor of the family basement. However, the following morning, Leik scraped away some of the black paint which had been sprayed in his basement to reveal a stain which looked ominously like human blood and immediately returned to the police station to report his findings.

The basement of Sgt. Leik's home was subjected to an intense forensic examination. Although forensic experts would deduce later that morning that the stains covered by the black paint had actually been varnish stains, one of the investigators discovered numerous hair clippings—many measuring less than three-eights of an inch—beside the family washing machine. When questioned as to the source of these clippings, Leik (who had not been informed of the discovery of the hair clippings found upon Beineman's panties) informed investigators that his wife regularly cut their children's hair in this basement, and that she had done so shortly before the family had embarked upon their vacation. Moreover, this search also uncovered small bloodstains in nine areas of the basement which had not been concealed by varnish. Two of these bloodstains were discovered to be type A—the blood type of Karen Sue Beineman.

The hairs found upon Beineman's panties and those recovered from the basement of the Leik home were subjected to a detailed forensic neutron analysis to determine whether they had sourced from the same individuals. Samples recovered from both locations would prove to be a precise match. Evidently, despite Collins' protestations of innocence and denials of even knowing Karen Sue Beineman, she had been in the basement of Collins' uncle at the time of, shortly before, or shortly after her murder.

Questioning of Leik's neighbors yielded additional circumstantial evidence: one neighbor, Marjorie Barnes, recalled having witnessed Collins leaving his uncle's home with a deluxe laundry detergent box prior to the Leik family returning from their vacation; another neighbor informed investigators she had heard the muffled screams of a young female emanating from the Leik household on the evening of Beineman's disappearance.

The same afternoon police searched the Leik family's basement, Collins was confronted with evidence thus far gained and deduced. Although Collins burst into tears when informed the stains on the floor covered with paint had been varnish, he quickly regained his composure and continued to deny any knowledge of Beineman. Later that day, having received initial laboratory reports indicating the hair samples recovered from Beineman's panties matched those discovered in Leik's basement, and that the bloodstains recovered from this location were of the same type as hers, Collins was arrested and his apartment and vehicles thoroughly searched.

Despite recovering numerous stolen items from his apartment and being informed by Arnold Davis that Collins had been in the habit of committing burglaries with a former roommate of theirs named Andrew Manuel, no incriminating evidence linking Collins to Beineman or any victim of the Michigan Murders was discovered, although officers were informed by Davis on this date of the incident two days earlier in which he (Davis) had observed Collins carrying a laundry box containing women's clothing and jewelry from his apartment and towards his car.

== Arraignment ==
On August 1, 1969, John Norman Collins was formally arraigned for the murder of Karen Sue Beineman. He was held without bond. At a press conference held on this date, Police Superintendent Frederick Davids revealed that Collins had been a suspect in the Beineman case from the day she had disappeared, and that these suspicions had heightened following their forensic examination of David Leik's basement. Furthermore, surveillance of Collins had been initiated on July 26, following the submission of a report compiled by Patrolman Larry Mathewson detailing the positive eyewitness identification he had obtained, and he had been formally arrested upon an open charge on the evening prior to his arraignment.

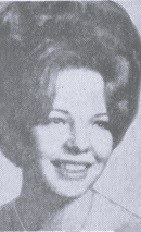
Roxie Ann Phillips

=== Link to additional murder ===
In early August, investigators were contacted by their counterparts in Salinas, California, who stated they had reason to believe a Michigan individual named John may be responsible for the June 30 death of a 17-year-old girl named Roxie Ann Phillips.

On August 3, two Washtenaw County detectives traveled to the Salinas Police Department to review information and determine whether a connection existed between Phillips' murder and those which Collins was suspected of committing in Michigan. Reviewing information regarding the murder of Roxie Ann Phillips, investigators discovered that immediately prior to her disappearance, Phillips had informed a close friend that she had become acquainted with an EMU student named John, who drove a silver-grey Oldsmobile Cutlass and who was temporarily residing with a friend in a camper-trailer.

Upon tracing Collins' movements in relation to the dates of the disappearance and murder of the seven murder victims linked to the Michigan Murderer (which then included Jane Mixer), police discovered that on June 21, Collins and his roommate, Andrew Manuel, had traveled to Monterey in Collins' Oldsmobile Cutlass, which the pair used to tow a camper-trailer they had rented under false names, and had paid for with a stolen check, for the vacation. Collins had later returned to Michigan alone in his vehicle; Manuel would later be located in Scottsdale, Arizona, following Collins' arrest.

Through interviewing acquaintances of Phillips, investigators established that she had been introduced to the individual she had referred to as "John from Michigan" through a 17-year-old friend named Nancy Ann Albrecht, who informed police she had herself become acquainted with Collins on June 29, and that she had mentioned her friend (Phillips) to Collins on this date. Albrecht described this individual, whose surname she did not know, as being 5 ft 11 in tall, clean-cut, with dark brown hair and who had described himself as an EMU senior with aspirations to become a teacher. Albrecht had provided Monterey County investigators with an identikit which, in addition to her descriptions of the suspect's possessions, circumstances and status, bore a striking resemblance to John Norman Collins. She had made arrangements to meet Collins at her home on the evening of June 30, but Collins had never arrived.

Phillips' nude, battered body had been found in a ravine in Carmel Highlands on July 13, with the belt belonging to her culotte dress knotted around her neck. She had been strangled to death and, as with several Michigan victims linked to Collins, one earring was missing. Several of Phillips' personal possessions would later be found strewn along State Route 68.

The rented trailer in which Collins and Manuel had traveled to California was located on August 1 in Monterey County, behind the home of Andrew Manuel's grandfather. A forensic examination of this trailer revealed it had been completely wiped of fingerprints. Upon questioning Manuel's grandfather, investigators were informed that his grandson and one John Collins had temporarily resided in the trailer—which they had hired from an Ypsilanti rental firm—between June and July, before both men had abandoned the trailer and (he believed) returned to Michigan.

Having compared case notes, investigators in both California and Michigan agreed enough similarities existed between the murder of Roxie Ann Phillips and the Michigan Murders to establish a definite connection between the cases. On August 5, this connection was formally announced to the public. An FBI arrest warrant was issued against Andrew Manuel, who was located in Phoenix on August 6 and detained by FBI agents. Manuel was extensively questioned as to his potential involvement in both Phillips' murder and those committed in Michigan which investigators had linked to Collins, and agreed to submit to a polygraph test. No hard evidence would ever arise suggesting his involvement in any murders, and the Washtenaw County prosecutor's office would publicly announce on December 18 their satisfaction that Manuel had "no knowledge of the murders." (Note: In November 1969, Andrew Manuel would plead guilty to charges of larceny by conversion and possession of stolen goods relating to the theft of, and failure to return, the camper-trailer, and the theft of property from a Michigan apartment.)

Michigan Murder victims
1. Mary Terese Fleszar (19): July 9, 1967
2. Joan Elspeth Schell (20): June 30, 1968
3. Maralynn Skelton (16): March 24, 1969
4. Dawn Louise Basom (13): April 15, 1969
5. Alice Elizabeth Kalom (21): June 8, 1969
6. Roxie Ann Phillips (17): June 30, 1969 (California)
7. Karen Sue Beineman (18): July 23, 1969

A formal indictment would later be served against Collins for the first-degree murder of Roxie Ann Phillips in April 1970, although the evidence surrounding this indictment was ordered to be sealed until after the trial of Collins for the murder of Beineman had concluded.

== Pretrial hearings ==
On August 14, 1969, Collins attended a pretrial hearing at Ypsilanti District Court. After hearing six hours of testimony from nine prosecution witnesses, Judge Edward Deake ruled that probable cause had been established, and Collins was formally ordered to stand trial for Beineman's murder.

At a second hearing in September, Collins refused to enter a plea; Washtenaw County Circuit Court Judge John Conlin ordered a plea of not guilty entered on his behalf. At this hearing, Collins' court-appointed attorney, Richard Ryan, challenged the validity of the physical evidence and the credibility of the circumstantial evidence before formally requesting the case against his client be dismissed and the evidence seized from his rooming house and vehicle suppressed upon the grounds Collins had not consented to a police search of his property. Ryan further stated at this hearing he was "undecided" as to whether he would argue that the upcoming trial should be held away from the Ann Arbor-Ypsilanti district due to pretrial publicity, and this final motion was held in abeyance until an impartial jury could be selected.

On October 14, Judge Conlin rejected further defense motions to dismiss the case and to suppress any evidence obtained, ruling Collins' arrest had been on the reasonable grounds he had committed a felony.

=== Independent polygraph test ===
In November, Ryan, in an effort to determine the most effective defense strategy, persuaded Collins to undergo a private and independent polygraph test. Prosecutor William F. Delhey agreed to a proviso that the test be conducted off the record and its results remain confidential. Three weeks after the examination, at a meeting with the family in Judge Conlin's chambers, Ryan summarized its tentative conclusions and suggested a "diminished capacity" plea for an insanity defense. Mrs. Collins, incensed at the implication, immediately dismissed Ryan from the case.

In January 1970, Neil Fink and Joseph Louisell, partners at one of Detroit's highest-priced law firms, agreed to take over Collins' defense. Mrs. Collins reportedly remortgaged her home to secure their services. Judge Conlin set a trial date of June 1.

== Trial ==
The trial of John Norman Collins for the murder of Karen Sue Beineman began in the Washtenaw County Court Building on June 2, 1970. Collins was tried in Ann Arbor, before Judge John Conlin. The prosecution consisted of William Delhey and Booker Williams; the defense consisted of Neil Fink and Joseph Louisell.

Initial jury selection began on June 2 and continued until July 9. Several motions by the defense counsel throughout the jury selection process that the trial should be moved to a jurisdiction outside of Washtenaw County were rejected by Judge Conlin, who ruled on June 29 that the fourteen members of the jury selected from Ann Arbor by this date and considered satisfactory by both counsels would serve as jurors throughout the trial. Upon recommendation from his lawyers, Collins chose not to testify in his own defense.

The prosecutors at Collins' trial opted to charge Collins only with the murder of Beineman, with the state arguing that she had been murdered by Collins in the basement of the Leik household. In his opening statement to the jury on July 20, Delhey outlined the prosecution's contention that the evidence to be presented would form a clear pattern indicating that Collins had been in the company of Beineman at the time she was last seen alive by Joan Goshe and her assistant; that he had taken her to the home of his own uncle, where he had tortured and beaten her before strangling her to death at this location; and that he had then discarded her body, before attempting to persuade his roommate to provide him with a false alibi.

The two primary questions before the jury, Delhey stated, would be the accuracy of eyewitnesses who would be called to testify and, ultimately, whether the more than 500 hair samples found upon Beineman's panties matched the hair clippings later recovered from the basement of Collins' uncle. Delhey also stated the prosecution's intent to prove that Collins had had sole access to his uncle's home and basement on the afternoon of Beineman's disappearance, and although he had made concerted efforts to remove physical evidence from the crime scene, blood samples recovered from this location were a match for the blood type of the victim. Delhey formally closed his opening statement to the jury by requesting they return a verdict of life imprisonment with no possibility of parole. (Note: The death sentence was not an option for the prosecution to seek as Michigan had legislatively abolished the death penalty for murder in 1846.)

The defense contended that although the murder of Beineman was a "vicious, sadistic attack" which had degraded her body "to a point almost beyond human comprehension," the prosecution's case that Collins was the perpetrator of the crime was a weak one at best. Defense attorneys Neil Fink and Joseph Louisell, in their opening statement, labeled the eyewitnesses' identification of both Collins and his motorcycle as flawed and unreliable, and stated their intentions to introduce several witnesses who would provide an alibi for their client for the afternoon Beineman had been abducted and murdered. Collins' attorneys also alleged these alibi witnesses had been subjected to police harassment, that the tests conducted upon the hair samples found upon Beineman's panties were unreliable, and that Collins' uncle had refused to divulge the blood type(s) of his own family to defense attorneys.

=== Witness testimony ===
Formal witness testimony began on July 20. The first two witnesses to testify were Beineman's two roommates, each of whom discussed Beineman's character and her movements on the day of her disappearance. These two witnesses were followed on July 26 by the individual who had found Beineman's body, and by the medical examiner called to the crime scene, Dr. Craig Barlow. Barlow testified that although Beineman had been deceased for almost seventy-two hours, her body had only lain in the location where she was found for twenty-four hours before discovery.

The following day, Washtenaw County Sheriff Douglas Harvey testified as to the discovery of Beineman's body, her subsequent autopsy, and his obtaining an updated composite drawing of the suspect from Joan Goshe and her assistant, Patricia Spaulding. Both women had agreed this composite drawing was accurate, and only disagreed as to the structure of the suspect's chin. Furthermore, Goshe also testified to having identified, prior to his arrest, a photograph shown to her of Collins as being the man she had seen with Beineman.

To expand on their allegations that certain defense witnesses had been subjected to police harassment and that eyewitness accounts had been flawed, defense attorney Joseph Louisell subjected Sheriff Harvey to a 45-minute cross-examination as to his contact with the two eyewitnesses prior to completion of this composite drawing. In this cross-examination, Sheriff Harvey admitted to having driven Mrs. Goshe and her assistant to East Lansing to view the updated composite drawing of the suspect in Beineman's murder, and that he had shown photographs of various suspects, including Collins, to Goshe prior to her formally identifying Collins in a lineup.

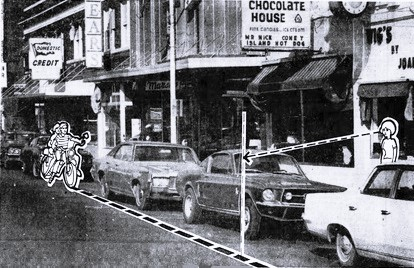
Scale illustration depicting the approximate location of Collins' motorcycle, as parked upon Washington Street and seen by eyewitnesses Joan Goshe and Patricia Spaulding

Three days after both counsels had begun introducing witnesses, Joan Goshe was called to testify on behalf of the prosecution. In response to questioning from prosecution attorneys, Goshe described how, on the afternoon of her disappearance, Beineman had informed her she had accepted a lift home from the man waiting outside her wig shop. When asked to formally identify the individual upon whose motorcycle she had observed waiting outside her shop, Goshe pointed directly at Collins. The testimony of Joan Goshe was further supported by Patricia Spaulding, who testified as to having observed Collins for between three and four minutes as he had waited upon Washington Street for Beineman to return to his motorcycle, which she remained adamant had been a "well-kept" blue Triumph Bonneville with a square rear-view mirror. Spaulding further testified the timing of this sighting had been approximately 12:20 p.m.

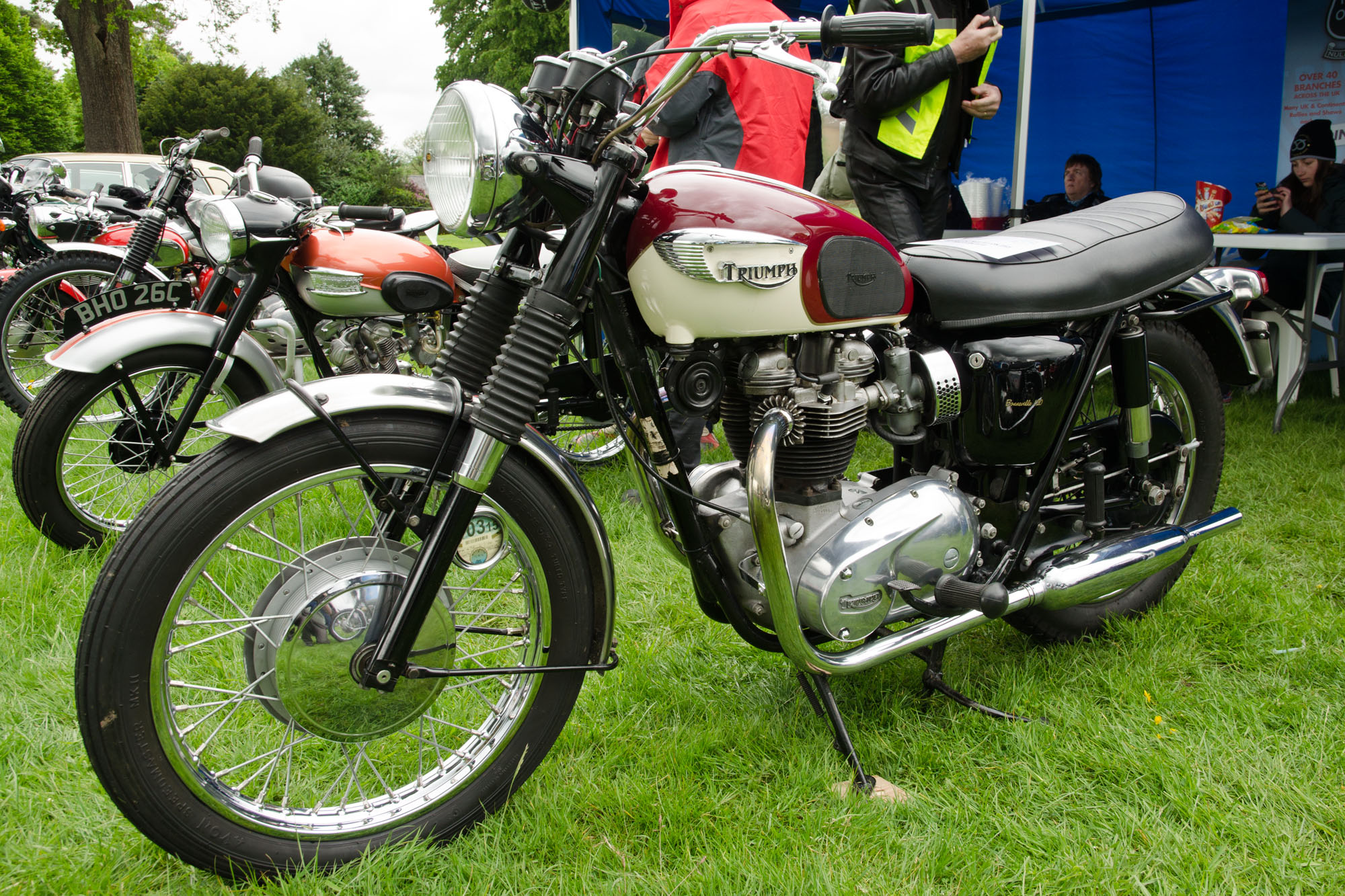
A Triumph Bonneville T120. Three witnesses testified as to Collins riding a distinctive blue chrome model of this motorcycle in the vicinity of Beineman's abduction on the third and fourth day of his trial.

Although subject to intense cross-examination by Neil Fink as to the credibility of her testimony, Goshe remained insistent in her identification of Collins as being the individual who had waited for Beineman to return to his motorcycle. In an effort to discredit Goshe's testimony, Fink diverted questioning as to the model of motorcycle she had seen outside her shop, to which Goshe conceded her initial belief as to the model being a Honda 350 was inaccurate. In response to questions as to her personal character, Goshe further conceded she had previously lied under oath on two occasions (one instance of which was unrelated to the trial).

Also to testify on July 23 was a young woman named Karen Naylor, who had frequently gone on motorcycle rides with Collins between March and June 1969, and whom he had promised to take swimming on the date of Beineman's murder, although he stood her up. Naylor—herself a motorcycle enthusiast—stated Collins typically rode a small green Triumph Bonneville with markedly high handlebars and a square rear-view mirror on the left handlebar, but that in the days prior to Beineman's murder, he had ridden a larger "blue, heavy chromed" 650cc model of the motorcycle with standard handlebars and a square rear-view mirror, which he had told her he had recently acquired in California. Furthermore, this witness stated that on the day Collins was arrested, she had entered his garage to observe that he had switched the handlebars on his motorcycles in order that his green Triumph now had the standard handlebars, and the larger, blue chromed model bore the distinctive high handlebars. Furthermore, his green Triumph now had a round "bent and crushed" rear-view mirror upon the handlebar, whereas the blue Triumph had no rear-view mirror upon the handlebars.

On July 27, Arnold Davis testified as to his being in the company of Collins throughout the late afternoon and evening of July 23, 1969 (hours after Beineman had last been seen alive). The following day, following a consultation with opposing counsels, Judge Conlin allowed Davis to testify as to having observed Collins hurriedly remove a laundry box containing women's clothing and jewelry from his apartment and place this box in the trunk of his car two days prior to his arrest. (Note: The prosecution had initially intended to question Davis in detail as to each of the contents of this laundry box upon the grounds that the contents Davis had previously described to investigators may include Beineman's missing cut-off blue jeans; however, Collins' attorneys successfully objected to this motion upon the grounds that Collins was solely on trial for the murder of Karen Sue Beineman, and this testimony could suggest a link to the six other victims of the Michigan Murders then linked to the same perpetrator. The prosecution was therefore limited to questioning Davis with regards to whether the contents of this box included women's clothing and jewelry, without specifically describing any particular item.)

Also testifying at the trial on behalf of the prosecution was Marjorie Barnes, who testified on July 30 to having observed Collins leaving his uncle's home carrying a laundry box covered with a blanket on either July 24 or 25, 1969. In addition, Mrs. Sandra Leik testified to Collins being given a key to the family home in order to feed the family's German shepherd. Mrs. Leik also testified to having cut her children's hair in her basement two days prior to embarking on a vacation with her family, and that when they had returned home, she had noticed that several items from her basement had been moved, that she had discovered a wet, soiled cloth containing hair aside a laundry tub, and that other items—including a nearly-full bottle of ammonia—were missing.

The same day, the head of the state police crime laboratory, Sgt. Kennard Christensen, testified as to the results of forensic tests conducted in the Leik family basement, which confirmed evidence of bloodstains in four separate areas. In response to defense questioning, Sgt. Christensen further stated that although partial fingerprints had been discovered in the basement of the Leik family, no full fingerprints had been discovered in the basement which had not belonged to a Leik family member.

On July 31, the prosecution introduced two forensic witnesses to testify in relation to physical evidence indicating the victim had been killed inside the Leik family home. The first witness to testify was the head of the Michigan Health Department's Crime Detective Laboratory, Walter Holz, who testified as to the human hair clippings found inside Karen Sue Beineman's panties being an exact match to those recovered from the basement of Sgt. David Leik. Although subjected to intense cross-examination by Joseph Louisell as to the reliability of his findings, Holz remained adamant the color, length, type and diameter of the hair samples found upon Beineman's panties were a precise match to those found in the Leik family basement. Immediately following the testimony of Walter Holz, a colleague of his named Curtis Fluker testified that the blood type of the tissue samples recovered from the Leik family basement matched that of Beineman.

The final witness to appear for the prosecution at Collins' trial was a University of California chemistry professor named Dr. Vincent P. Guinn, who testified on August 5 as to his conclusions that the hair samples retrieved from Beineman's panties bore "a remarkable similarity" to those retrieved from the Leik household and that, upon statistical calculations he had begun the previous month, the odds of erroneous matching of the hair samples earlier testified to by Walter Holz were quite low. Upon cross-examination, Dr. Guinn did agree with defense attorney Neil Fink that a statistical analysis of hair mixtures had never been attempted in a court of law, although he remained firm that his applications had been performed via scientific principles.

=== Defense witnesses ===
Five independent witnesses were called to testify on behalf of the defense as to Collins' whereabouts on the dates Beineman had disappeared and her body had been found. Four of these witnesses were employees of a motorcycle sales firm which Collins had visited on the afternoon of Beineman's disappearance. Each testified on August 6. The timing of these four witnesses' recollections as to when Collins had actually entered the motorcycle shop varied slightly, although consensus among three of these men was that he had entered the premises as they were eating lunch, which they typically did anytime between 1 and 2 p.m.

Upon cross-examination, the time factor of these witnesses as to when they had actually seen Collins expanded to between noon and 2 p.m. Two of these employees had signed statements affirming the time Collins had entered their premises was approximately 2 p.m., although one of these witnesses stated he had been repeatedly harassed by an Ann Arbor Police Sergeant as to the actual time he had seen Collins.

On August 8, Collins' attorneys introduced a renowned neutron analyst named Dr. Robert Jervis in an effort to discredit the earlier testimony of the forensic experts who had testified on behalf of the prosecution. Dr. Jervis testified as to his belief that insufficient chemical samples had existed in the samples retrieved from the basement which the prosecution scientists had worked with to form their conclusions, and that to form a conclusive neutron activation analysis, at least ten components in a hair sample must be compared, whereas only five components had been used by the prosecution's forensic experts to determine their findings. The forensic experts who had testified on behalf of the prosecution, Dr. Jervis stated, had therefore based their conclusions on "insufficient data".

Dr. Jervis' conclusions were supported by a private consultant named Auseklis Perkons, and a Massachusetts-based Director of Forensic Research named Samuel Golub. Perkons testified as to his belief that the hair samples retrieved from Beineman's panties were of a "different origin" than the hair samples retrieved from the Leiks' basement, whereas Golub stated that because he had found only one single fiber upon the victim's panties, the likelihood of her undergarments accumulating these hairs from a basement was extremely remote. In rebuttal to the testimony of Dr. Golub, the defense recalled Dr. Walter Holz on August 12 to testify as to the samples he had himself taken to Dr. Golub for identification; Dr. Holz affirmed that he had taken twenty magnified photographic slides of samples retrieved from Beineman's panties to Dr. Golub's laboratory for analysis, and that they had contained numerous man-made fibrous materials.

=== Closing arguments ===
On August 13–14, both prosecution and defense attorneys delivered their closing arguments to the jury. Prosecuting attorney William Delhey argued first, recounting the evidence the state had presented and Collins' conscious efforts to destroy physical evidence at the Leik household, before telling the jury that their collective application of common sense could only dictate a guilty verdict.

Following the state's closing argument, both Neil Fink and Joseph Louisell delivered separate closing arguments on behalf of the defense, describing Collins as a "young victim of circumstances" and dismissing much of the evidence presented as "fuzzy allegations," with Louisell being particularly scornful as to the testimony of Walter Holz, to whose conclusions, he asserted, the prosecution hinged its entire case. In a brief final argument on behalf of the prosecution, Booker Williams re-emphasized the physical and circumstantial evidence against Collins, before accusing the defense attorneys of attempting to sow doubt in, particularly, the forensic evidence presented by the prosecution.

In a final address to the jury on August 14, Judge Conlin informed the panel they had two choices in the verdict they could render: guilty of first-degree murder, or not guilty. The jury then retired to consider their verdict, and would deliberate for over twenty-seven hours over a period of three days, with an additional five-and-a-half hours devoted to their re-reading portions of testimony, before announcing they had reached their verdict.

== Conviction and incarceration ==
On August 19, 1970, John Norman Collins was unanimously found guilty of the first-degree murder of Karen Sue Beineman. He remained impassive while the jury foreman announced the verdict, although many spectators gasped audibly, and his mother and sister left the courtroom in tears. Formal sentencing was scheduled for 8:30 a.m. on August 28. Collins was sentenced to life imprisonment with no possibility of parole. Prior to passing the sentence, Judge Conlin asked Collins if he wished to address the court before mandatory life sentencing was imposed. In response, Collins rose from his chair and made the following speech:

I have two things to say: I think they [the jury] conscientiously tried to give me a fair trial. The jury did not take its task lightly, but, I think things were blown out of proportion. The circumstances surrounding this case prevented me from getting a fair trial. It was a travesty of justice that took place in this courtroom. I hope some day it will be corrected; second, I never knew a girl named Karen Sue Beineman; I never had a conversation with her. I never took her to a wig shop; I never took her to my uncle's home ... I never took her life.

Collins was then informed by Judge Conlin that if the jurors' verdict was wrong, the error would be corrected in due course. He was then sentenced to serve a term of life imprisonment with hard labor, in solitary confinement, at Southern Michigan Prison in Jackson, Michigan. (Note: Collins' sentencing to a mandatory term of life imprisonment at the age of 23 made him the youngest inmate incarcerated at Southern Michigan Prison to receive this sentence.)

Upon receipt of the guilty verdict against their client, Collins' defense attorneys announced their intention to appeal upon the grounds of "tainted identification and the change of venue question." The first motion by Collins' attorneys, contending denial of defense motions to move the trial outside of Washtenaw County and the prejudice of prosecution witnesses, was filed with the Michigan Court of Appeals on December 14, 1970. This first appeal was formally rejected on October 24, 1972.

== Post-sentencing appeals ==
Between 1972 and 1976, Collins appealed his murder conviction on four further occasions, citing contentions that the Michigan Murders had received extensive media publicity in Washtenaw County, and that five separate motions for change of venue had been submitted by the defense counsel (two of which had been filed throughout the actual jury selection process) upon the grounds of pretrial publicity minimizing any chance of obtaining an unbiased jury in Washtenaw County. Each motion filed had been reserved or, in the final instance, denied.

His lawyers further argued that, at an evidentiary hearing in April 1970, shortly before jury selection had begun, Collins' indictment for the California murder of Roxie Ann Phillips had likewise received extensive media coverage in Washtenaw County—further reducing the chances of potential jurors being unbiased. Moreover, a psychologist retained by the defense had testified to this on April 20, 1970. This psychologist had been adamant that Collins' trial should be held outside Washtenaw County, and this motion had likewise been reserved. Furthermore, Collins' lawyers argued issues such as the admissibility of testimony relating to the microscopic analysis of hair samples presented at his trial and the denial of defense motions to suppress prosecution witnesses.

In each appeal instance, Collins' conviction was upheld, with successive appellate judges of the Supreme Court announcing in October 1974 their refusal to review his conviction and the Court of Appeals for the Sixth Circuit announcing their own satisfaction with the earlier findings of the district court. Each ruling stated no evidence existed to suggest extensive publicity had interfered with pretrial or trial proceedings, and that police had not broken any protocol in showing two eyewitnesses photographs of Collins prior to his arrest and their being asked to identify him in a police lineup.

At his 1972 appeal hearing, Collins' lawyers did succeed in securing the partial striking of the testimony of Dr. Vincent P. Guinn, the final prosecution witness at his trial, who had testified as to the odds of erroneous matching of the hairs found upon Karen Beineman's panties to those in the Leik family basement being "more than a million-to-one." This appeal motion was partly upheld upon the basis that Dr. Guinn's testimony relating to probabilities was based upon on the statistical probability of another prosecution expert, and therefore, this part of his testimony was impermissible. Nonetheless, the three appellate judges at this appeal hearing concluded thus: "In our view, improperly admitted testimony that is merely corroborative of properly admitted evidence is not the basis for holding the error reversible."

== Subsequent developments ==
=== Waiver of California extradition ===
At the time of his 1970 conviction, a grand jury indictment against Collins remained outstanding in relation to the murder of Roxie Ann Phillips in Monterey County, California. The physical and circumstantial evidence linking Collins to this particular murder was stronger than any of the six outstanding murders then linked to him in Michigan, and authorities in Monterey filed several motions to extradite Collins to California to stand trial for Phillips' murder in 1970 and 1971. These motions were repeatedly contested by Collins' attorney, Neil Fink, who opposed and successfully delayed his client's extradition upon the grounds of due process.

The state of California postponed their requests to extradite Collins to face charges relating to Phillips' murder in June 1971, citing Collins' then-ongoing appeals against his convictions in the state of Michigan as the cause, and their likely resubmittal should any of his Michigan appeals be successful. Just six months later, in January 1972, Monterey County District Attorney William Curtis formally announced, via a spokesman, the intention of California authorities to waive all extradition proceedings against Collins for Phillips' murder. This spokesman indicated the reasoning being that, as Collins had already received a life sentence in Michigan, the case therefore was undeserving of "priority attention" by California authorities, in part due to the fact Collins would be returned to Michigan to serve his sentence if convicted. At the time of the announcement of this decision, preliminary legal maneuvers between Michigan and California authorities had been ongoing to extradite Collins to Monterey County to face trial for Phillips' murder.

=== Evidence of culpability in remaining cases ===
Although he was never tried for the murders of Fleszar, Schell, Skelton, Basom, Kalom, or Phillips, physical and circumstantial evidence exists in each case indicating that Collins did indeed commit these murders. For example, in the case of Mary Fleszar, investigators discovered that at the time of her disappearance, Collins had worked part-time in the EMU administration unit, and that his office had been located directly opposite the hallway from the office where Fleszar had worked. One of the personal items missing from Fleszar's body was a distinctive Expo 67 Canadian silver dollar she is known to have worn around her neck. This item was discovered in Collins' dresser when police conducted a search of his room. When confronted with this finding, Collins reportedly denied any knowledge of the existence of this item and insisted it had never been in his room; he had apparently neglected to dispose of this item as he had the personal possessions of other victims two days prior to his arrest.

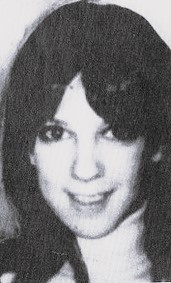
Joan Schell, c. spring 1968

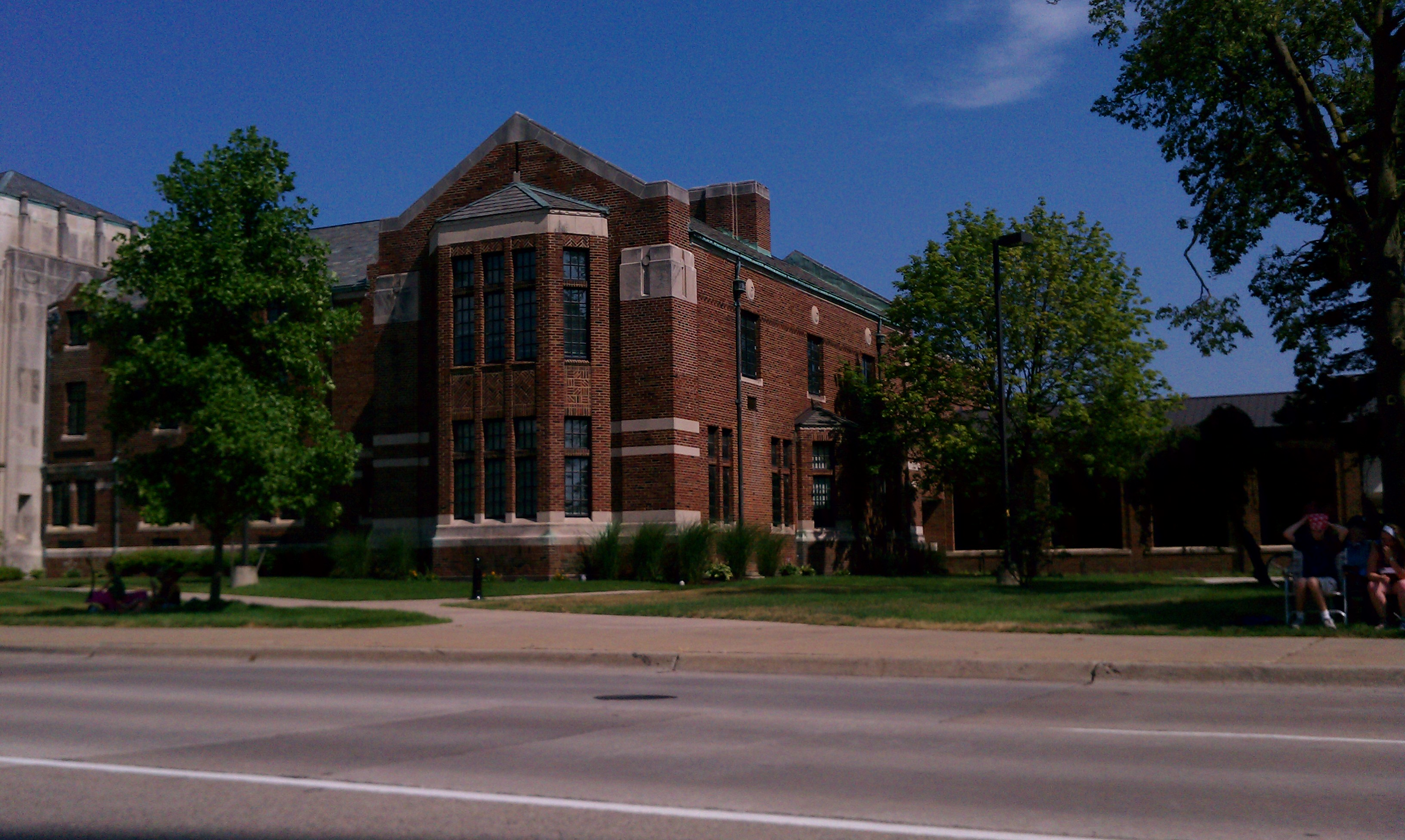
McKenny Hall, Eastern Michigan University. Joan Schell was last seen by her roommate entering a vehicle with a man matching Collins' description at this location on June 30, 1968.

In the case of Joan Elspeth Schell, two separate witness accounts had placed the victim both entering a car with three men on the night of her disappearance, and walking alone in the company of a man believed to be Collins later that evening. One of the men in the car Schell had entered was Collins' roommate, Arnold Davis, who later informed police the girl had indeed entered the car he had been driving, but that Collins had insisted he give Schell the lift she was seeking to Ann Arbor in his own car. Collins and Schell had alighted from Davis's car together, and he (Davis) had not seen his roommate for almost three hours before Collins had returned to their apartment, alone, referring to Schell as a "bitch" and claiming he had "dropped her [Schell] off" in Ann Arbor after being unable to obtain the sexual encounter he had hoped to achieve with her. According to Davis, Collins had been carrying a red handbag, which he claimed Schell had left in his car. He had further informed his roommate he had agreed to drive Schell from Ann Arbor to Ypsilanti the following day. Davis informed police he had long suspected Collins had murdered Schell, but had been too afraid to report his suspicions. Although Collins had claimed to police that he had been with his mother in the Detroit suburb of Center Line on the weekend of Schell's disappearance, police had never sought to verify his alibi.

The circumstantial evidence linking Collins to Schell's abduction and murder was stronger than that of any other Michigan victim linked to him, and police formally announced this fact within days of his arrest. Nonetheless, the decision of the prosecution at his 1970 trial was to try Collins solely with the murder of Beineman.

Arnold Davis also informed police Collins had been in the company of victim Alice Kalom on the evening of her disappearance. According to Davis, he had heard Collins and Kalom arguing behind closed doors, before Kalom had run out of his (Collins') apartment, with Collins chasing after her. Collins had returned to their shared apartment shortly thereafter before asking Davis to hide a knife for him and accusing Kalom of being a "tease". Davis had reported this incident to police, and later handed them the knife Collins had allegedly asked him to hide. Investigators determined the knife was consistent with the weapon used to stab Kalom.

When Kalom's body was found, a distinctive boot print on her skirt was found to be a perfect match to a boot Collins had owned, and although Collins had evidently cleaned his car in an effort to destroy evidence prior to his arrest, investigators found bloodstains in the vehicle and on a raincoat he owned which were determined to match Kalom's blood type. Moreover, although the prosecution at Collins' trial had been unable to question Arnold Davis in detail as to the contents of the laundry box he had observed his roommate hurriedly remove from their apartment and towards his car two days prior to his arrest, one of the items he had seen within this laundry box had been a distinctive purple leather shoe, which may have belonged to Kalom.

In the case of California victim Roxie Ann Phillips, police had discovered that, prior to her murder, the victim had told a close friend she had met an Eastern Michigan University student named John, who owned a silver Oldsmobile Cutlass and several motorcycles; her nude, strangled body was found discarded in a patch of poison oak on July 13, with the distinctive red-and-white floral patterned belt from her culotte dress knotted around her neck. Following Collins' arrest, a section of a red-and-white belt bearing the same distinctive floral pattern was found in the trailer he and Manuel had towed to Salinas on June 21. Moreover, a sweater found in Collins' closet was found to contain 22 pubic hairs which had not originated from Collins or any of the seven Michigan victims. At the request of Michigan authorities, Phillips' body was exhumed in Oregon in order that pubic hair samples could be obtained from her for comparison with those found upon Collins' sweater: The pubic hairs upon Collins' sweater proved to be a precise match to those obtained from Phillips' body, and investigators believe they may have transferred from her body to Collins' sweater as she was carried to the location in which her body was discarded. In addition, prior to his returning to Michigan, Collins is known to have visited a California hospital to receive treatment for poison oak anaphylaxis.

=== Investigative error ===
Three days prior to Collins' July 30 arrest, in direct breach of a Washtenaw County Prosecutor order, two young Ann Arbor detectives had arrived at the Emmet Street apartment Collins shared with his roommate to question him as to the circumstantial evidence then-obtained against him. Collins had protested his innocence on this occasion, and insisted the eyewitnesses' identifications of him had been erroneous, although he refused requests to return to the police station to take a polygraph test. No search warrant had been sought prior to Collins being questioned on this date, and his apartment would only be searched on July 30—two days after Arnold Davis had observed Collins hurriedly remove a box containing women's clothing and jewelry from his apartment.

Had this violation of the county prosecutor's order not taken place, Collins may not have realized how seriously he was considered a suspect at that stage, and thus may not have disposed of the physical evidence which would have assisted in linking him to other victims linked to the Michigan Murderer.

== Aftermath ==
In the years immediately following his conviction, Collins' mother, siblings and several of his friends remained steadfast in their belief that Collins had been the victim of a miscarriage of justice. While incarcerated at Southern Michigan Prison, he received regular visits from family and friends. Collins' mother, Loretta, and his two siblings, Jerry and Gail, refused to speak with Sgt. David Leik and his wife, Sandra, following their testimony against Collins at his trial. Despite the evident distress of Sandra Leik throughout her testimony, during which she had testified that Collins had been as "close to me" as her own sons, and that she had remained in an uncomposed state since his arrest, Collins' family remained steadfast in their resolve to avoid contact with the Leiks.

For several years following his incarceration, Collins refused to grant interviews to the media. However, six years after his conviction, Collins formally requested a personal interview with reporters from The Ann Arbor News. In this interview, Collins vehemently denied his guilt in any of the Michigan Murders. He asserted that key evidence attesting to his innocence had been suppressed by the prosecution team at his 1970 trial, that the jury had been biased, and the scientific testimony related to blood and hair comparisons had been invalid.

In October 1977, Collins was transferred from Southern Michigan Prison to Marquette Branch Prison, a more secure facility, due to his repeated dealing in contraband drugs and his conspiring with a fellow inmate to escape. Collins was unable to participate in the actual (successful) escape due to having a broken foot. Another escape attempt at Marquette Branch Prison, via a tunnel with six fellow inmates, was thwarted on January 31, 1979, and Collins and his co-conspirators were transferred to a more secure cell block.

In 1980, Collins legally changed his surname to that of his biological father, Chapman. The following year, he formally requested transfer to a Canadian prison, in the belief this would facilitate his prospects of eventual release. (Chapman holds dual citizenship and under Canadian law, would then have been eligible for parole after serving just nine years in Canada.) His application was granted, then reversed in the wake of public outrage. Despite Chapman repeatedly challenging the overturning of the 1981 decision to transfer him to a Canadian prison, a federal appellate court ruled in May 1988 that Chapman should remain incarcerated at Marquette Branch Prison.

In September 1988, Chapman agreed to participate in a live interview conducted by the WXYZ-TV talk show Kelly & Company, to discuss his conviction. For security reasons, this proposed live interview was cancelled, although Chapman agreed to submit to a filmed interview. In this interview, he again denied culpability for any of the Michigan Murders, and insisted the prosecution case against him was flawed.

Chapman was transferred to the Ionia Correctional Facility in August 1990. Throughout his earlier incarceration at Southern Michigan Prison and Marquette Branch Prison, he had earned a reputation as a troublesome inmate who repeatedly flouted prison rules, was known to deal in contraband goods, and who had served several periods of isolation for various breaches of prison rules. He would later be returned to Marquette Branch Prison.

On July 11, 2005, a 62-year-old former nurse named Gary Earl Leiterman was charged with the murder of Jane Mixer, who was once considered the possible third chronological victim of the Michigan Murderer, although the modus operandi of her murder was significantly different than that of the Michigan Murders. Leiterman had lived 20 miles from the University of Michigan at the time of Mixer's murder, and had never been considered a suspect in any of the crimes. After the case was reopened in 2001, advancements in DNA analysis identified the DNA on Mixer's pantyhose as sourcing from Leiterman, (Note: Leiterman's DNA had been entered into a national database due to a 2001 felony conviction he had received for forging prescriptions.) and there were partial matches to his DNA on both the bloody towel placed beneath her head and the nylon stocking used to garrote her. He was convicted on July 22, and sentenced to life imprisonment without parole. His conviction was upheld by the Michigan Court of Appeals in 2007. (Note: DNA from a convicted murderer named John Ruelas—who had been four-and-a-half-years-old at the time of Mixer's murder—was matched to a single drop of blood found on Mixer's left hand. As the Ruelas and Mixer cases had been processed at approximately the same time in the state laboratory, Leiterman's attorney, Mark Satawa, had argued upon appeal that the test results had been contaminated, and were therefore unreliable.)

Chapman is currently serving his life sentence at the Carson City Correctional Facility. He maintains frequent correspondence with individuals–particularly women–who write to him, and continues to maintain his innocence of the murder of Beineman, as well as other victims linked to the Michigan Murderer, despite having refused a 1977 offer to submit to a further, public polygraph test.

== Media ==
=== Film ===
- An unreleased movie, Now I Lay Me Down to Sleep, draws direct inspiration from Edward Keyes' book, The Michigan Murders. Filmed in 1977 and directed by William Martin, Now I Lay Me Down to Sleep remains unreleased.

=== Books ===
- Buhk, Tobin (2011). True Crime: Michigan: The State's Most Notorious Criminal Cases. Stackpole Books. ISBN 0-8117-0713-X.
- Fournier, Gregory (2016) Terror in Ypsilanti: John Norman Collins Unmasked. Wheatmark. ISBN 978-1-627-87403-8.
- James, Earl (1991). Catching Serial Killers: Learning from Past Serial Murder Investigations. International Forensic Services. ISBN 0-9629-7140-5.
- Keyes, Edward (1976). The Michigan Murders. Reader's Digest Press. ISBN 978-0-472-03446-8.
- Marriott, Trevor (2013). The Evil Within. John Blake Publishing. ISBN 978-1-85782-798-9.
- Wilson, Colin; Seaman, Donald (1988). Encyclopedia of Modern Murder: 1962–1982. Bonanza Books. ISBN 978-0-517-66559-6.

=== Television ===
- Detroit-based talk show Kelly & Company broadcast an episode focusing on the Michigan Murders in October 1988. This episode featured prerecorded prison interviews with Collins in addition to live interviews with police and legal personnel connected to the case.
- Investigation Discovery broadcast an episode focusing upon the Michigan Murders. The episode, A New Kind of Monster, was first broadcast December 10, 2013 as part of the series A Crime to Remember.

== See also ==
- Capital punishment in Michigan
- Capital punishment in the United States
- List of homicides in Michigan
- List of serial killers by number of victims
- List of serial killers in the United States

== Cited works and further reading ==
- Buhk, Tobin (2011). True Crime: Michigan:The State's Most Notorious Criminal Cases. Pennsylvania: Stackpole Books. pp. 91–106. ISBN 978-0-8117-0713-8.
- Cawthorne, Nigel; Tibballs, Geoff (1994) [1993]. Killers: The Ruthless Exponents of Murder. London: Boxtree Publishing. pp. 463–467. ISBN 0-752-20850-0.
- Dobbert, Duane (2009). Psychopathy, Perversion, and Lust Homicide: Recognizing the Mental Disorders that Power Serial Killers. Westport, Connecticut: Praeger Publishers. pp. 115–119. ISBN 978-0-313-36621-5.
- Flowers, R. Barri (2001). Murders in the United States: Crimes, Killers and Victims of the Twentieth Century. Jefferson, North Carolina: McFarland & Company Inc. pp. 91–92. ISBN 978-0-786-42075-9.
- Fournier, Gregory A. (2016). Terror in Ypsilanti: John Norman Collins Unmasked. Tucson, Arizona: Wheatmark Publishing. ISBN 978-1-627-87403-8.
- Holloway, Diane (2016). Legendary Lawman: Johannes F. Spreen. Bloomington, Indiana: iUniverse. ISBN 978-1-440-11517-2.
- Hubbard, Jim (2013). Shooting Back from the Heart. Bloomington, Indiana: Author Solutions. ISBN 978-1-452-57767-8.
- James, Earl (1991). Catching Serial Killers: Learning from Past Serial Murder Investigations. County Durham, England: International Forensic Services. ISBN 978-0-962-97140-2.
- Jessel, David (1992). Murder Casebook, Investigations into the Ultimate Crime. London, England: Marshall Cavendish. pp. 3963–3983. ISBN 0748535209.
- Keyes, Edward (2010) [1976]. The Michigan Murders. Ann Arbor, Michigan: University of Michigan Press. ISBN 978-0-472-03446-8.
- Lane, Brian; Gregg, Wilfred (1995) [1992]. The Encyclopedia Of Serial Killers. New York City: Berkley Book. pp. 110–112. ISBN 0-425-15213-8.
- Levin, Jack; Fox, Thomas (1991). Mass Murder: America's Growing Menace. New York: Penguin Publishing Group. ISBN 978-0-425-12443-7.
- Mayo, Michael (2013). American Murder: Criminals, Crime, and the Media. Canton, Michigan: Visible Ink Press. ISBN 978-1-578-59191-6.
- Newton, Michael (2002). The Encyclopedia of Kidnappings. New York City: Facts on File, Inc. ISBN 978-1-438-12988-4.
- Power, Alan (2003). World's Infamous Killers: Ruthless Serial Killers and Notorious Murderers. London, England: Octopus Publishing Group. ISBN 978-0-785-81746-8.
- Rossmo, Kim (1999). Geographic Profiling. Oxford: Routledge Publishing. p. 166. ISBN 0-8493-8129-0.
- Smyth, Frank (1995). "The Ypsilanti Ripper". Real-Life Crimes (110). London, England: Eaglemoss Publications Ltd.: 2407–2417. ISBN 978-1-856-29970-1.
- Wilson, Colin; Seaman, Donald (1988). Encyclopedia of Modern Murder: 1962-1982. Prineville, Oregon: Bonanza Books. pp. 110–112. ISBN 978-0-517-66559-6.
- Wynn, Douglas (1996). On Trial for Murder. London: Pan Books. pp. 59–61. ISBN 0-330-33947-8.
