= Bill Knott (poet) =

American writer (1940–2014)

- Born: William Kilborn Knott; February 17, 1940; Carson City, Michigan, United States
- Died: March 12, 2014 (aged 74)
- Occupations: Writer, poet

William Kilborn Knott (17 February 1940 – 12 March 2014) was an American poet.

== Life ==
Born in Carson City, Michigan, US, Knott received his MFA from Norwich University and studied with John Logan in Chicago.

His first collection of poems, The Naomi Poems: Corpse and Beans, was published in 1968 under the name Saint Geraud, a fictional persona whose backstory included a suicide two years prior to the publishing. The Naomi Poems was well received and brought him to the attention of such poets as James Wright, who called him an "unmistakable genius." The Naomi referenced in the poems was fellow poet, Naomi Lazard, Bill Knott's muse in his earlier poems.

Knott taught at Emerson College for more than 25 years, published many books of poetry, and was awarded the Iowa Poetry Prize and a Guggenheim fellowship.

== Work ==
Early in his career, Knott was noted for writing unusually short poems, some as short as one line, and untitled. Later he became interested in metrical verse forms and syllabics. He was not a believer in poetic "branding" and throughout his career refused to restrict himself to one particular school or style of writing. His poetry's subjects, themes and tones were also wide-ranging. His work often displayed a wry, self-deprecating sense of humor, and he was critical of what he saw as an epidemic of humorlessness in contemporary American poetry. Poets who cite him as an influence include Thomas Lux, Mary Karr, Stephen Dobyns, Denise Duhamel, Denis Johnson, and Janaka Stucky. One of Johnson's novels, Already Dead: A California Gothic, was inspired by Knott's "Poem Noir."

A selection of his work, I Am Flying Into Myself: Selected Poems, 1960–2014, was compiled by Thomas Lux and published by Farrar, Straus and Giroux in February 2017.

Knott was also a visual artist, known for giving away booklets of his poetry with hand-painted covers.

== Bibliography ==
Books published by Bill Knott include:

- The Naomi Poems: Book One: Corpse and Beans (1968), Follett, under the pseudonym 'Saint Geraud'
- Aurealism: A Study (1969), Salt Mound Press. (chapbook)
- Auto-Necrophilia; The _____ Poems, Book 2 (1971), Big Table Pub., ISBN 0-695-80188-0
- Nights of Naomi (1972), Big Table (chapbook)
- Love Poems to Myself (1974), Barn Dream Press, Boston, OCLC 3709433 (chapbook)
- Rome in Rome (1976), Release Press.
- Lucky Darryl (1977), Release Press. (novel in collaboration with James Tate) ISBN 978-0913722107
- Selected and Collected Poems (1977), SUN
- Becos (1983), Random House, ISBN 0-394-52924-3
- Outremer (1989), University of Iowa Press, ISBN 0-87745-255-5
- Poems 1963–1988 (1989), University of Pittsburgh Press, ISBN 0-8229-5416-8
- Collected Political Poems 1965–1993 (1993) Self-published chapbook
- Sixty Poems of Love and Homage (1994) Self-published chapbook
- The Quicken Tree (1995), Boa Editions, Hardcover ISBN 1-880238-24-1 Softcover ISBN 1-880238-25-X
- Laugh at the End of the World: Collected Comic Poems 1969–1999 (2000), Boa Editions, ISBN 1-880238-84-5
- The Unsubscriber (2004), Farrar, Straus and Giroux, ISBN 0-374-53014-9
- Stigmata Errata Etcetera (2007), Saturnalia Books, ISBN 978-0-9754990-4-7
