= Carson City Correctional Facility =

Prison in Carson City, Michigan

Carson City Correctional Facility (DRF)
- Interactive map of Carson City Correctional Facility (DRF)
- Location: Carson City, Michigan; 43.16268°N 84.87014°W
- Status: Open
- Security class: Levels I, II, and IV
- Capacity: 1,246
- Opened: 1989
- Managed by: Michigan Department of Corrections
- Warden: Randee Rewerts
- Website: Official website

Carson City Correctional Facility (DRF) is a Michigan prison, located near Carson City, for adult male prisoners.

== History ==
The prison was opened in 1989. In 1997, two gun towers were added to the facility to enhance security.

On August 9, 2009, Boyer Road Correctional Facility was consolidated into Carson City Correctional Facility.

== Facility ==
The prison has seven housing units used for Michigan Department of Corrections male prisoners 18 years of age and older. A 120-bed unit houses Level I (low security) prisoners. Three units, with 720 beds total, house Level II prisoners. Two units, with 384 beds total, house Level IV prisoners. There is also one housing unit with 22 beds used for segregating inmates from the general prison population. All housing units, except the one used for segregating prisoners, use bunk beds.

=== Security ===
The facility is surrounded by double fences with razor-ribbon wire and two gun towers. Electronic detection systems and patrol vehicles are also utilized to maintain perimeter security.

== Services ==
The facility offers education programs and Level I prisoners may work, under supervision, on public work assignments in the area. Onsite medical and dental care is supplemented by local hospitals and the Duane L. Waters Hospital in Jackson, Michigan.

== Notable Inmates ==
- Leslie Allen Williams - Murdered 4 women in the early 1990s.
- John Norman Collins - murdered 7 people in Michigan and California in the 1960s.

== See also ==
- List of Michigan state prisons
