= Fairplain Township, Michigan =

- Township
- Location within Michigan Location within the United States
- Coordinates: 43°09′45″N 85°7′49″W
- Country: United States
- State: Michigan
- County: Montcalm

Area
  - Total: 36.0 sq mi (93 km^{2})
  - Land: 35.2 sq mi (91 km^{2})
  - Water: 0.7 sq mi (1.8 km^{2})
- Elevation: 840 ft (256 m)

Population (2020)
  - Total: 1,802
  - Density: 51.2/sq mi (19.8/km^{2})
- Time zone: UTC-5 (Eastern (EST))
  - Summer (DST): UTC-4 (EDT)
- ZIP codes: 48834 (Fenwick); 48838 (Greenville); 48884 (Sheridan); 48809 (Belding)
- FIPS code: 26-117-27180
- GNIS feature ID: 1626267
- Website: www.montcalm.us/390/Fairplain-Township

Fairplain Township is a civil township of Montcalm County in the U.S. state of Michigan. The population was 1,802 at the 2020 census.

== Communities ==
- Fenwick is an unincorporated community in the southeast part of the township at 43°08′57″N 85°04′49″W. The Fenwick post office, with ZIP code 48834, serves the southeastern portion of Fairplain Township as well as portions of surrounding townships. Fenwick was founded in 1872 by B. C. Loree, who named it after his home town, Fenwick, Ontario. A post office opened on April 28, 1873, with James R. Hall as its first postmaster. It was platted and recorded on May 22, 1874, by S. C. Alderman for the proprietors Simon M., Sarah, and David Griswold.
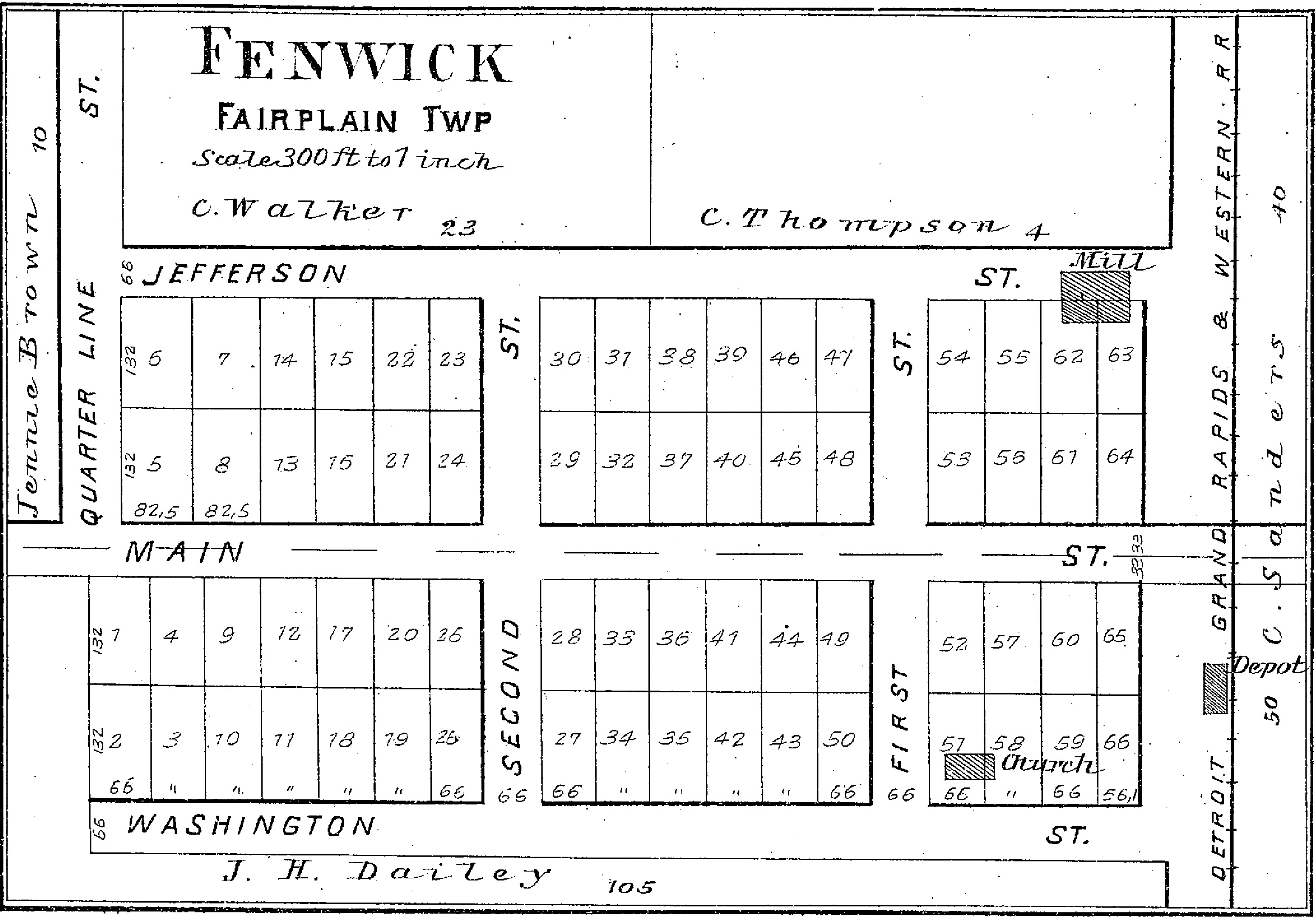

== Geography ==
Fairplain Township is in southern Montcalm County and is bordered to the south by Ionia County. State highway M-57 crosses the central part of the township, leading west to Greenville and east to Carson City.

According to the U.S. Census Bureau, the township has a total area of 36.0 square miles (93 km^{2}), of which 35.2 square miles (91 km^{2}) are land and 0.7 square miles (1.8 km^{2}), or 2.05%, are water. The township is drained by Dickerson Creek, a tributary of the Flat River, except for small areas on the eastern border which drain to Prairie Creek. The Flat River and Prairie Creek are each south-flowing tributaries of the Grand River, flowing to Lake Michigan.

== Demographics ==
Historical population
Census	Pop.	Note	%±
1850	229		—
1860	491		114.4%
1870	974		98.4%
1880	1,422		46.0%
1890	1,131		−20.5%
1900	1,183		4.6%
1910	1,171		−1.0%
1920	961		−17.9%
1930	930		−3.2%
1940	877		−5.7%
1950	862		−1.7%
1960	932		8.1%
1970	1,087		16.6%
1980	1,380		27.0%
1990	1,575		14.1%
2000	1,826		15.9%
2010	1,836		0.5%
2020	1,802		−1.9%
U.S. Decennial Census

As of the census of 2000, there were 1,826 people, 615 households, and 492 families residing in the township. The population density was 51.5 inhabitants per square mile (19.9/km^{2}). There were 664 housing units at an average density of 18.7 per square mile (7.2/km^{2}). The racial makeup of the township was 95.78% White, 1.26% African American, 0.33% Native American, 0.33% Asian, 0.55% from other races, and 1.75% from two or more races. Hispanic or Latino of any race were 2.52% of the population.

There were 615 households, out of which 41.6% had children under the age of 18 living with them, 66.3% were married couples living together, 8.5% had a female householder with no husband present, and 20.0% were non-families. 15.3% of all households were made up of individuals, and 5.2% had someone living alone who was 65 years of age or older. The average household size was 2.90 and the average family size was 3.17.

In the township the population was spread out, with 29.2% under the age of 18, 7.4% from 18 to 24, 30.4% from 25 to 44, 23.7% from 45 to 64, and 9.2% who were 65 years of age or older. The median age was 35 years. For every 100 females, there were 106.3 males. For every 100 females age 18 and over, there were 105.7 males.

The median income for a household in the township was $42,955, and the median income for a family was $46,830. Males had a median income of $32,632 versus $21,442 for females. The per capita income for the township was $15,833. About 3.8% of families and 8.3% of the population were below the poverty line, including 4.4% of those under age 18 and 8.6% of those age 65 or over.

== Notable people ==
- Ivy Winters, drag queen
