= Michigan's 99th House of Representatives district =

American legislative district

Michigan's 99th State House of Representatives district
Representative
| Mike Hoadley; R–Au Gres |
- Demographics: 92.3% White; 0.6% Black; 2.4% Hispanic; 0.6% Asian; 0.2% Native American; 0.3% Other; 3.6% Multiracial
- Population (2024): 90,280

Michigan's 99th House of Representatives district (also referred to as Michigan's 99th House district) is a legislative district within the Michigan House of Representatives located in parts of Bay, Clare, and Gladwin counties, as well as all of the Arenac, Iosco, and Ogemaw counties. The district was created in 1965, when the Michigan House of Representatives district naming scheme changed from a county-based system to a numerical one. The district lines were redrawn to now consist of Iosco, Ogemaw and Arenac counties in their entirety and portions of Bay, Clare and Gladwin counties.

== List of representatives ==
| Representative | Party | Dates | Residence | Notes |
|---|---|---|---|---|
| Donald E. Holbrook Jr. | Republican | 1965–1972 | Clare | |
| Donald Van Singel | Republican | 1973–1982 | Grant | |
| Colleen Engler | Republican | 1983–1986 | Mount Pleasant | |
| Joanne G. Emmons | Republican | 1987–1990 | Big Rapids | |
| James E. McBryde | Republican | 1991–1998 | Mount Pleasant | |
| Sandy Caul | Republican | 1999–2004 | Mount Pleasant | |
| Bill Caul | Republican | 2005–2010 | Mount Pleasant | |
| Kevin Cotter | Republican | 2011–2016 | Mount Pleasant | |
| Roger Hauck | Republican | 2017–2022 | Mount Pleasant | |
| Mike Hoadley | Republican | 2023–present | Au Gres | |

== Recent elections ==
=== 2020s ===
2026 Michigan House of Representatives election
| Party | Candidate | Votes | % |
|---|---|---|---|
| Republican | Mike Hoadley (incumbent) | 28,839 | 66.72 |
| Democratic | David Forgione | 13,645 | 31.57 |
| Libertarian | Steven Jacob Lull | 739 | 1.71 |
| Total votes | | 43,223 | 100 |
| Republican hold | | | |

2024 Michigan House of Representatives election
| Party | Candidate | Votes | % |
|---|---|---|---|
| Republican | Mike Hoadley | 36,710 | 71.1 |
| Democratic | Jon LeRoux | 14,926 | 28.6 |
| Total votes | | 51,636 | 100 |
| Republican hold | | | |

2022 Michigan House of Representatives election
| Party | Candidate | Votes | % |
|---|---|---|---|
| Republican | Mike Hoadley | 28,126 | 67.7 |
| Democratic | Kenneth Kish | 13,449 | 32.3 |
| Total votes | | 41,575 | 100 |
| Republican hold | | | |

2020 Michigan House of Representatives election
| Party | Candidate | Votes | % |
|---|---|---|---|
| Republican | Roger Hauck | 24,017 | 61.1 |
| Democratic | John Zang | 14,363 | 36.5 |
| Green | Melissa Noelle Lambert | 949 | 2.4 |
| Total votes | | 39,329 | 100 |
| Republican hold | | | |

2018 Michigan House of Representatives election
| Party | Candidate | Votes | % |
|---|---|---|---|
| Republican | Roger Hauck | 16,127 | 53.4 |
| Democratic | Kristen Brown | 14,062 | 46.6 |
| Total votes | | 30,189 | 100 |
| Republican hold | | | |

2016 Michigan House of Representatives election
| Party | Candidate | Votes | % |
|---|---|---|---|
| Republican | Roger Hauck | 18,358 | 54.6 |
| Democratic | Bryan Mielke | 15,291 | 45.4 |
| Total votes | | 33,649 | 100 |
| Republican hold | | | |

2014 Michigan House of Representatives election
| Party | Candidate | Votes | % |
|---|---|---|---|
| Republican | Kevin Cotter | 11,347 | 51.5 |
| Democratic | Bryan Mielke | 10,676 | 48.5 |
| Total votes | | 22,023 | 100 |
| Republican hold | | | |

2012 Michigan House of Representatives election
| Party | Candidate | Votes | % |
|---|---|---|---|
| Republican | Kevin Cotter | 18,150 | 57.4 |
| Democratic | Adam Lawrence | 13,468 | 42.6 |
| Total votes | | 31,618 | 100 |
| Republican hold | | | |

2010 Michigan House of Representatives election
| Party | Candidate | Votes | % |
|---|---|---|---|
| Republican | Kevin Cotter | 16,647 | 64.4 |
| Democratic | Toni Sessoms | 9,202 | 35.6 |
| Total votes | | 25,849 | 100 |
| Republican hold | | | |

2008 Michigan House of Representatives election
| Party | Candidate | Votes | % |
|---|---|---|---|
| Republican | Bill Caul | 22,486 | 54.4 |
| Democratic | Nancy White | 17,578 | 42.6 |
| Libertarian | Devon Smith | 1,244 | 3.0 |
| Total votes | | 41,308 | 100 |
| Republican hold | | | |

== Historical district boundaries ==
| Map | Description | Apportionment Plan | Notes |
|---|---|---|---|
| | Clare County; Mecosta County; Newaygo County; Osceola County | 1964 Apportionment Plan | |
| | Isabella County (part); Broomfield Township; Coldwater Township; Mecosta County; Montcalm County (part); Belvidere Township; Cato Township; Douglass Township; Eureka Township; Greenville; Maple Valley Township; Montcalm Township; Pierson Township; Pine Township; Reynolds Township; Stanton (part); Winfield Township; Newaygo County; Osceola County (part); Evart Township | 1972 Apportionment Plan | |
| | Isabella County Mecosta County | 1982 Apportionment Plan | |
| | Clare County Isabella County | 1992 Apportionment Plan | |
| | Isabella County Midland County (part): Coleman; Edenville Township; Geneva Township; Greendale Township; Hope Township; Jasper Township; Jerome Township; Larkin Township (part); Lee Township; Lincoln Township (part); Mills Township; Porter Township; Warren Township | 2001 Apportionment Plan | |
| | Isabella County Midland County (part): Coleman; Edenville Township; Geneva Township; Greendale Township; Hope Township; Ingersoll Township; Jasper Township; Mills Township; Mount Haley Township; Porter Township; Warren Township | 2011 Apportionment Plan | |
