= Fred Meijer White Pine Trail State Park =

Rail trail and state park in Michigan, United States

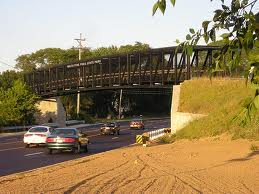
- Length: 92 mi (148 km)
- Location: Lower Peninsula, Kent County, Mecosta County, Montcalm County, Osceola County, Wexford County, Michigan USA
- Established: 1996
- Trailheads: Comstock Park, Michigan; Rockford, Michigan; Cedar Springs, Michigan; Sand Lake, Michigan; Howard City, Michigan; Morley, Michigan; Big Rapids, Michigan; Paris, Michigan; Reed City, Michigan; Tustin, Michigan; Cadillac, Michigan
- Use: Cycling, Hiking, Snow-mobiling, XC skiing
- Difficulty: Easy
- Season: All
- Surface: Asphalt, Packed Gravel, Cinders
- Maintained by: Michigan Department of Natural Resources
- Website: Official site
- Bike trail route highlighted in red
Trail map

Fred Meijer White Pine Trail State Park is a 92-mile (148 km) long linear state park in the U.S. state of Michigan.

The trail extends from northern Grand Rapids to Cadillac, and it lies on the path graded for the Grand Rapids and Indiana Railroad (later absorbed by the Pennsylvania Railroad). The White Pine Trail is a rail trail park. It was named the "Fred Meijer White Pine Trail State Park" after a donation by grocery store executive Fred Meijer.

== History ==
As the railroad ceased operation in the mid-1980s, the Michigan Department of Transportation came to own the rail bed. By 1994 the property was transferred to the Michigan Department of Natural Resources (DNR), which began replacing the rails with a trail for public recreational use.

== Current Condition ==
The trail extends from Ann Street in Grand Rapids north to Cadillac. The trail is completely paved as of the fall of 2023.

Snowmobiles are permitted on most of the trail, between Russell Road (near Cedar Springs) and South Street in Cadillac. Motorized wheel vehicles (other than personal accessibility devices) are not permitted.

In addition to the Michigan DNR doing maintenance on the trail, volunteers, organized by Friends of the White Pine Trail. also provide hundreds of volunteer hours of maintenance and advocacy work.

== Communities Along Trail ==
The trail passes through the following communities:

- Comstock Park, Michigan
- Belmont, Michigan
- Rockford, Michigan
- Cedar Springs, Michigan
- Sand Lake, Michigan
- Pierson, Michigan
- Howard City, Michigan
- Morley, Michigan
- Stanwood, Michigan
- Big Rapids, Michigan
- Paris, Michigan
- Reed City, Michigan
- Ashton, Michigan
- Le Roy, Michigan
- Tustin, Michigan
- Cadillac, Michigan

== Waypoints ==
Waypoints for the Fred Meijer White Pine Trail State Park. ↑ in the Distance column points to the other waypoint that the distance is between.

Location	Services	Distance (approx.)	Coordinates
Cadillac, Michigan	Parking, Restroom, Drinking Fountain		44°14′49″N 85°24′01″W
Waypoint 2	Parking, Restroom	↑ 2.2 miles (3.5 km)	44°13′22″N 85°25′37″W
Tustin, Michigan	Parking, Restroom	↑ 8.5 miles (13.7 km)	44°06′09″N 85°27′29″W
Le Roy, Michigan	Parking, Restroom	↑ 4.5 miles (7.2 km)	44°02′19″N 85°27′00″W
Reed City, Michigan	Drinking Fountain, Restroom, Parking	↑ 12 miles (19 km)	43°52′41″N 85°30′32″W
Paris, Michigan	Restroom, Parking	↑ 6.2 miles (10.0 km)	43°47′20″N 85°30′08″W
Big Rapids, Michigan	Parking, Restroom, Parking, Repair Station, Water Fountain	↑ 5 miles (8.0 km)	43°43′04″N 85°29′09″W
Morley, Michigan	Drinking Fountain, Parking, Restroom	↑ 16 miles (26 km)	43°29′26″N 85°26′42″W
Howard City, Michigan	Drinking Fountain, Restroom, Parking	↑ 6.5 miles (10.5 km)	43°23′49″N 85°28′12″W
Cedar Springs, Michigan	Parking, Drinking Fountain, Restroom	↑ 12.1 miles (19.5 km)	43°11′01″N 85°34′00″W
Comstock Park, Michigan	Parking	↑ 16 miles (26 km)	43°01′30″N 85°39′56″W

== Plans ==
The trail is also connected to other trail systems in the state, including the Kent Trails system in Grand Rapids (currently connected with a designated bike route through the city between Butterworth Ave SW and the Lake Michigan Credit Union Ballpark,) Musketawa Trail, much as the White Pine Trail already connects with the Pere Marquette State Trail in Reed City.
