= Tri County Area Schools =

American public school district

Address
- 94 Cherry Street Sand Lake, Kent County, Michigan, 49343; United States

District information
- Grades: Pre-Kindergarten-12
- Superintendent: Ryan J. Biller
- Schools: 3
- Budget: $41,005,000 2022-2023 expenditures
- NCES District ID: 2633930

Students and staff
- Students: 1,643 (2024-2025)
- Teachers: 90.9 (on an FTE basis) (2024-2025)
- Staff: 244.58 FTE (2024-2025)
- Student–teacher ratio: 18.07 (2024-2025)

Other information
- Website: www.tricountyschools.com

Tri County Area Schools is a public school district in West Michigan. In Kent County, it serves Sand Lake and parts of the townships of Nelson and Solon. In Montcalm County it serves Howard City, Pierson, Pierson Township and Reynolds Township and parts of the townships of Maple Valley and Winfield. In Newaygo County, it serves parts of the townships of Croton and Ensley.

== History ==
Sand Lake and Howard City were in separate districts prior to 1962. The state mandated curriculum improvements that the small Sand Lake High School would find difficult to meet. The Howard City district was in a similar situation.

Sand Lake had a K-12 school district within a single building built in 1924. It was the third school in Sand Lake, the first being built in 1872 and the second in 1907. By 1957, the 1924 brick school was so overcrowded that classes were held in other locations around town, and the village auditorium was used for gym class.

Howard City High School, later known as the Edgerton Building, was located on the corner of Grant and Edgerton Streets and contained all grades. The first school in Howard City was established in 1869. The Edgerton Building was built around 1937, (replacing the school next door built around 1883) funded in part by the Public Works Administration.

The districts' solution was to combine resources by consolidating. Tri County Area Schools came into existence on April 3, 1962, the day members of those communities voted in favor of consolidating their schools; 415 voted, with 366 favoring consolidation. The consolidated schools began operation in fall 1962. The Howard City High School became the Tri County High School, and the Sand Lake High School became a junior high school.

Tri County Middle School was built as the district's new high school in 1964. Wold & Bowers Architects of Grand Rapids designed the building. It was replaced by the current high school in 1993. Greiner, Inc. was the architect.

The current Tri County Elementary opened in fall 2023 on the campus of the high school and middle school.

== Schools ==
Schools in Tri County Area Schools district
| School | Address | Notes |
|---|---|---|
| Tri County High School | 21338 Kendaville Rd., Howard City | Grades 9–12. Built 1993. |
| Tri County Middle School | 21350 Kendaville Rd., Howard City | Grades 6–8. Built 1964. |
| Tri County Elementary School | 21502 Kendaville Rd., Howard City | Grades K–5. Built 2023. |
| McNaughton Learning Center | 415 S.Cedar Street, Howard City | Preschool and alternative education programs housed in former McNaughton Elementary. |
