= Reynolds Township, Michigan =

- Township
- Location within Michigan Location within the United States
- Coordinates: 43°24′30″N 85°28′45″W
- Country: United States
- State: Michigan
- County: Montcalm

Area
  - Total: 36.1 sq mi (93 km^{2})
  - Land: 35.7 sq mi (92 km^{2})
  - Water: 0.4 sq mi (1.0 km^{2})
- Elevation: 896 ft (273 m)

Population (2020)
  - Total: 5,431
  - Density: 152.3/sq mi (58.8/km^{2})
- Time zone: UTC-5 (Eastern (EST))
  - Summer (DST): UTC-4 (EDT)
- ZIP Codes: 49329 (Howard City); 49336 (Morley); 49337 (Newaygo)
- FIPS code: 26-117-68120
- GNIS feature ID: 1626966
- Website: www.reynoldstwp.com

Reynolds Township is a civil township of Montcalm County in the U.S. state of Michigan. The population was 5,431 at the 2020 census.

== Geography ==
The township is in the northwest corner of Montcalm County, bordered to the north by Mecosta County and to the west by Newaygo County. The village of Howard City is in the southeast part of the township.

The U.S. Route 131 freeway crosses the center of the township, leading north to Big Rapids and southwest to Grand Rapids. State highway M-46 enters the township from the east, then joins US 131 to leave the township to the south. M-82 leads west from US 131 in the southern part of the township.

According to the U.S. Census Bureau, Reynolds Township has a total area of 36.1 square miles (93 km^{2}), of which 35.7 square miles (92 km^{2}) are land and 0.4 square miles (1.0 km^{2}), or 1.15%, are water. The Little Muskegon River crosses the northwestern part of the township, and its tributary, Tamarack Creek, flows across the southern part. The township is part of the Muskegon River watershed, running westward toward Lake Michigan.

=== Communities ===
- Conger is an unincorporated place established in 1872.
- Howard City (population 1,835 in 2020) is a village located within the township.

== Demographics ==
Historical population
Census	Pop.	Note	%±
1870	457		—
1880	1,569		243.3%
1890	1,804		15.0%
1900	2,015		11.7%
1910	1,544		−23.4%
1920	1,295		−16.1%
1930	1,182		−8.7%
1940	1,194		1.0%
1950	1,236		3.5%
1960	1,560		26.2%
1970	1,830		17.3%
1980	2,362		29.1%
1990	3,028		28.2%
2000	4,279		41.3%
2010	5,310		24.1%
2020	5,431		2.3%
U.S. Decennial Census

As of the census of 2000, there were 4,279 people, 1,534 households, and 1,142 families residing in the township. The population density was 118.7 inhabitants per square mile (45.8/km^{2}). There were 1,693 housing units at an average density of 47.0 per square mile (18.1/km^{2}). The racial makeup of the township was 96.24% White, 0.47% African American, 0.56% Native American, 0.14% Asian, 0.02% Pacific Islander, 0.44% from other races, and 2.13% from two or more races. Hispanic or Latino of any race were 1.66% of the population.

There were 1,534 households, out of which 38.3% had children under the age of 18 living with them, 58.7% were married couples living together, 11.1% had a female householder with no husband present, and 25.5% were non-families. 20.7% of all households were made up of individuals, and 8.3% had someone living alone who was 65 years of age or older. The average household size was 2.79 and the average family size was 3.17.

In the township the population was spread out, with 31.0% under the age of 18, 7.8% from 18 to 24, 30.6% from 25 to 44, 21.4% from 45 to 64, and 9.1% who were 65 years of age or older. The median age was 33 years. For every 100 females, there were 95.2 males. For every 100 females age 18 and over, there were 94.3 males.

The median income for a household in the township was $40,799, and the median income for a family was $45,046. Males had a median income of $32,367 versus $22,157 for females. The per capita income for the township was $15,589. About 7.8% of families and 11.6% of the population were below the poverty line, including 15.9% of those under age 18 and 8.7% of those age 65 or over.

== Education ==
Tri County Area Schools, including Tri County High School, serves the community.
