= Pierson Township =

Pierson Township may refer to the following places in the United States:

- Pierson Township, Vigo County, Indiana
- Pierson Township, Michigan
