= Aetna Township, Mecosta County, Michigan =

Aetna Township, Michigan
- Township
- Location within Michigan Location within the United States
- Coordinates: 43°29′49″N 85°28′20″W
- Country: United States
- State: Michigan
- County: Mecosta

Area
  - Total: 35.95 sq mi (93.1 km^{2})
  - Land: 35.55 sq mi (92.1 km^{2})
  - Water: 0.39 sq mi (1.0 km^{2})
- Elevation: 1,001 ft (305 m)

Population (2020)
  - Total: 2,241
  - Density: 63/sq mi (24/km^{2})
- Time zone: UTC-5 (Eastern (EST))
  - Summer (DST): UTC-4 (EDT)
- ZIP Codes: 49336 (Morley); 49337 (Newaygo); 49346 (Stanwood)
- FIPS code: 26-107-00500
- GNIS feature ID: 1625805
- Website: aetnatownshipmecosta.com

Aetna Township is a civil township of Mecosta County in the U.S. state of Michigan. As of the 2020 census, the township population was 2,241.

== History ==
The township was established in 1865.

== Geography ==
Aetna Township is in the southwest corner of Mecosta County, bordered to the west by Newaygo County and to the south by Montcalm County. The village of Morley is in the southeastern part of the township and extends east into Deerfield Township. U.S. Route 131 crosses the township, leading north 14 miles (23 km) to Big Rapids, the Mecosta county seat, and south 40 miles (64 km) to Grand Rapids.

According to the United States Census Bureau, Aetna Township has a total area of 35.9 square miles (93 km^{2}), of which 35.6 square miles (92 km^{2}) are land and 0.4 square miles (1.0 km^{2}), or 1.10%, are water. The east side of the township is drained by the west-flowing Little Muskegon River, which crosses the township's southeast corner, and by its tributary Big Creek. The western side of the township drains directly to the southwest-flowing Muskegon River, which crosses the township's northwest corner.

== Demographics ==
As of the census of 2000, there were 2,044 people, 736 households, and 537 families residing in the township. The population density was 57.4 inhabitants per square mile (22.2/km^{2}). There were 866 housing units at an average density of 24.3 per square mile (9.4/km^{2}). The racial makeup of the township was 95.60% White, 0.39% African American, 1.52% Native American, 0.05% Asian, 0.59% from other races, and 1.86% from two or more races. Hispanic or Latino of any race were 0.83% of the population.

There were 736 households, out of which 36.5% had children under the age of 18 living with them, 57.2% were married couples living together, 9.1% had a female householder with no husband present, and 27.0% were non-families. 22.3% of all households were made up of individuals, and 7.3% had someone living alone who was 65 years of age or older. The average household size was 2.76 and the average family size was 3.19.

In the township the population was spread out, with 29.8% under the age of 18, 9.0% from 18 to 24, 28.9% from 25 to 44, 23.1% from 45 to 64, and 9.2% who were 65 years of age or older. The median age was 33 years. For every 100 females, there were 100.6 males. For every 100 females age 18 and over, there were 98.9 males.

The median income for a household in the township was $34,571, and the median income for a family was $36,683. Males had a median income of $31,397 versus $19,635 for females. The per capita income for the township was $14,141. About 10.2% of families and 18.3% of the population were below the poverty line, including 23.2% of those under age 18 and 10.0% of those age 65 or over.
