= Deerfield Township, Mecosta County, Michigan =

Deerfield Township, Michigan
- Township
- Location within Michigan Location within the United States
- Coordinates: 43°30′5″N 85°24′1″W
- Country: United States
- State: Michigan
- County: Mecosta

Area
  - Total: 35.9 sq mi (93 km^{2})
  - Land: 35.7 sq mi (92 km^{2})
  - Water: 0.2 sq mi (0.52 km^{2})
- Elevation: 902 ft (275 m)

Population (2020)
  - Total: 1,785
  - Density: 50/sq mi (19/km^{2})
- Time zone: UTC-5 (Eastern (EST))
  - Summer (DST): UTC-4 (EDT)
- ZIP Codes: 49336 (Morley); 49346 (Stanwood)
- FIPS code: 26-107-21240
- GNIS feature ID: 1626172
- Website: deerfieldmecosta.org

Deerfield Township is a civil township of Mecosta County in the U.S. state of Michigan. The population was 1,785 at the 2020 census.

== History ==
Deerfield Township was established in 1861.

== Geography ==
The township is in southern Mecosta County and is bordered to the south by Montcalm County. The village of Morley sits on the township's western border, extending west into Aetna Township. According to the U.S. Census Bureau, Deerfield Township has a total area of 35.9 square miles (93 km^{2}), of which 35.7 square miles (92 km^{2}) are land and 0.2 square miles (0.5 km^{2}), or 0.62%, are water. The Little Muskegon River flows east to west across the center of the township.

== Communities ==
- Borland was a hamlet in Deerfield Township. It was founded in 1869 by John A. Bell and named Bell Crossing. When the Grand Rapids and Indiana Railroad came through the place was renamed Bell Siding. The name was changed to Borland when the post office was established in the general store operated by Daniel Borland.

== Demographics ==
As of the census of 2000, there were 1,630 people, 531 households, and 420 families residing in the township. The population density was 45.6 inhabitants per square mile (17.6/km^{2}). There were 625 housing units at an average density of 17.5 per square mile (6.8/km^{2}). The racial makeup of the township was 95.95% White, 1.04% African American, 1.29% Native American, 0.43% Asian, 0.31% from other races, and 0.98% from two or more races. Hispanic or Latino of any race were 1.53% of the population.

There were 531 households, out of which 43.1% had children under the age of 18 living with them, 65.0% were married couples living together, 8.5% had a female householder with no husband present, and 20.9% were non-families. 16.4% of all households were made up of individuals, and 6.6% had someone living alone who was 65 years of age or older. The average household size was 3.07 and the average family size was 3.40.

In the township the population was spread out, with 33.6% under the age of 18, 9.2% from 18 to 24, 28.1% from 25 to 44, 19.0% from 45 to 64, and 10.1% who were 65 years of age or older. The median age was 30 years. For every 100 females, there were 100.5 males. For every 100 females age 18 and over, there were 98.2 males.

The median income for a household in the township was $36,293, and the median income for a family was $38,750. Males had a median income of $30,900 versus $24,886 for females. The per capita income for the township was $13,693. About 9.4% of families and 13.4% of the population were below the poverty line, including 17.8% of those under age 18 and 6.0% of those age 65 or over.
