= Green Charter Township, Michigan =

Charter township in Mecosta County, Michigan, United States

Green Charter Township
- Charter township
- Location within Michigan Location within the United States
- Coordinates: 43°46′21″N 85°30′14″W
- Country: United States
- State: Michigan
- County: Mecosta

Area
  - Total: 37.57 sq mi (97.3 km^{2})
  - Land: 36.97 sq mi (95.8 km^{2})
  - Water: 0.59 sq mi (1.5 km^{2})
- Elevation: 950 ft (290 m)

Population (2020)
  - Total: 3,219
  - Density: 87/sq mi (33.6/km^{2})
- Time zone: UTC-5 (Eastern (EST))
  - Summer (DST): UTC-4 (EDT)
- ZIP codes: 49338 (Paris); 49307 (Big Rapids; 49639 (Hersey)
- FIPS code: 26-107-34760
- GNIS feature ID: 1626393
- Website: www.greentownship.org

Green Charter Township is a charter township of Mecosta County in the U.S. state of Michigan. As of the 2020 census, the township population was 3,219. The township was organized in 1858, before Mecosta County was detached from Newaygo County.

== Communities ==
Paris is an unincorporated community, census-designated place, and the largest settlement within the township. It is located at 43°46′24″N 85°30′09″W on the Muskegon River about 5 miles (8 km) north of Big Rapids.

== Geography ==
Green Township is in the northwest corner of Mecosta County, bordered to the north by Osceola County, to the west by Newaygo County, and at its northwest corner by Lake County. U.S. Route 131 crosses the west side of the township, leading south to Big Rapids and Grand Rapids, and north to Reed City and Cadillac.

According to the United States Census Bureau, the township has a total area of 37.6 square miles (97 km^{2}), of which 37.0 square miles (96 km^{2}) are land and 0.6 square miles (1.6 km^{2}), or 1.58%, are water. The Muskegon River, a tributary of Lake Michigan, flows southward through the eastern part of the township. The river forms the township's northeast border with Grant Township.

== Demographics ==
As of the census of 2000, there were 3,209 people, 1,247 households, and 864 families residing in the township. The population density was 86.9 inhabitants per square mile (33.6/km^{2}). There were 1,414 housing units at an average density of 38.3 per square mile (14.8/km^{2}). The racial makeup of the township was 97.20% White, 0.87% African American, 0.47% Native American, 0.03% Asian, 0.22% from other races, and 1.22% from two or more races. Hispanic or Latino of any race were 1.03% of the population.

There were 1,247 households, out of which 34.0% had children under the age of 18 living with them, 56.0% were married couples living together, 10.0% had a female householder with no husband present, and 30.7% were non-families. 23.9% of all households were made up of individuals, and 6.8% had someone living alone who was 65 years of age or older. The average household size was 2.57 and the average family size was 3.05.

In the township the population was spread out, with 26.7% under the age of 18, 9.6% from 18 to 24, 28.8% from 25 to 44, 23.5% from 45 to 64, and 11.3% who were 65 years of age or older. The median age was 36 years. For every 100 females, there were 99.3 males. For every 100 females age 18 and over, there were 96.7 males.

The median income for a household in the township was $39,036, and the median income for a family was $43,884. Males had a median income of $36,970 versus $25,036 for females. The per capita income for the township was $18,212. About 11.1% of families and 10.6% of the population were below the poverty line, including 10.0% of those under age 18 and 7.7% of those age 65 or over.

== Factory controversy ==
In 2023, plans to build a battery factory by the China-based manufacturer Gotion have been met with resistance with some local residents because of Gotion's connection to the Chinese government. This controversy resulted in the entire town board being recalled. On November 7, 2023 and following two earlier resignations, the remaining five members of the Green Charter Township board were recalled. Before the recall, the board had unanimously approved a property tax abatement initiative to attract the Gotion plant to Mecosta County.

Construction for the plant has not begun due to community pressure and the unresolved lawsuit filed by Gotion against the Township. In March 2024, Gotion filed a federal lawsuit against the township for breach of contract regarding the connection of the plan to the township's water system.
