= Roger Hauck =

American politician (born 1961)

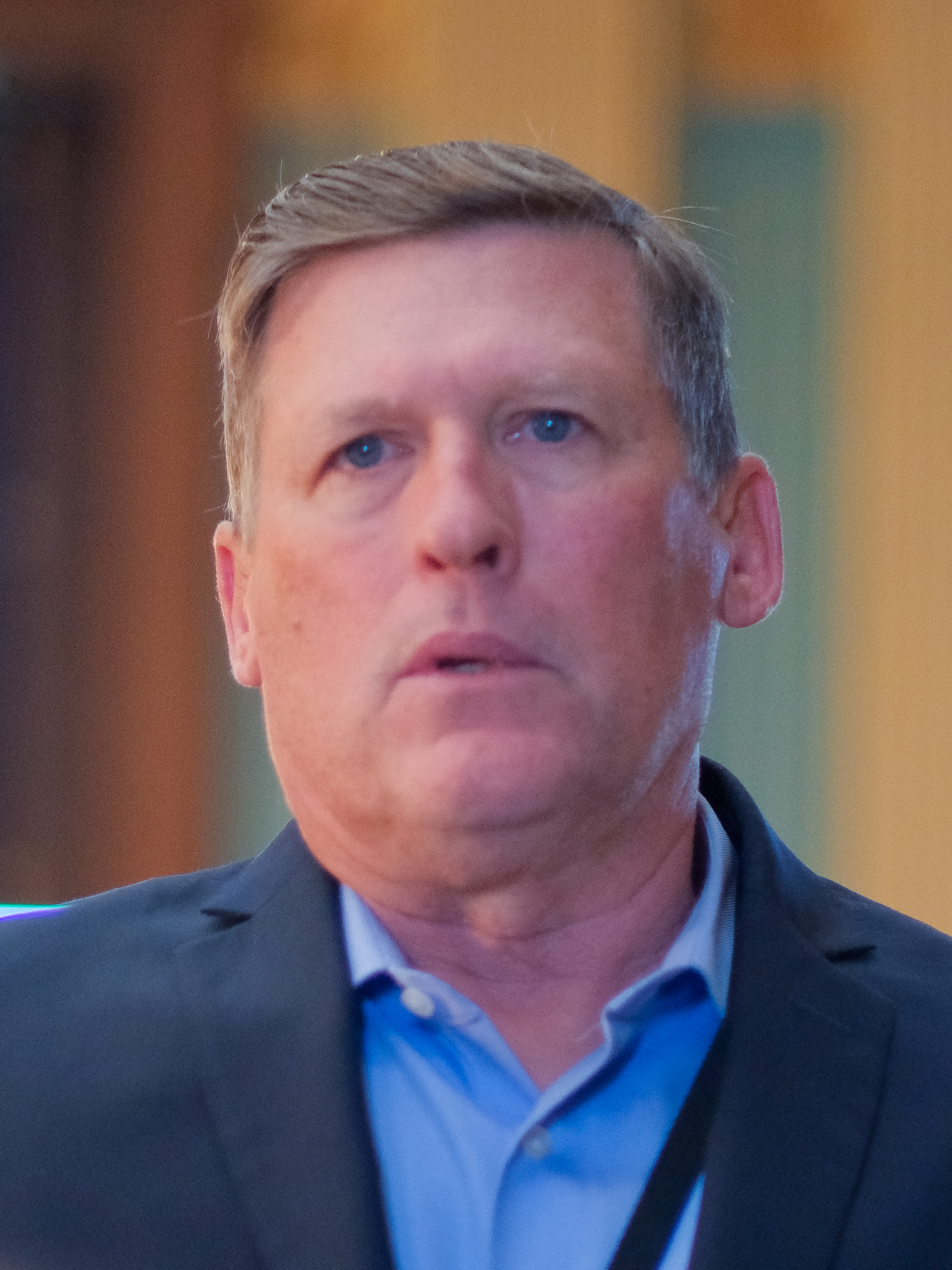
- Hauck in 2023

Minority Leader-elect of the Michigan Senate
- Assuming office January 2027
- Succeeding: Aric Nesbitt

Member of the Michigan Senate from the 34th district
- Incumbent
- Assumed office January 1, 2023
- Preceded by: Jon Bumstead

Member of the Michigan House of Representatives from the 99th district
- In office January 1, 2017 – January 1, 2023
- Preceded by: Kevin Cotter
- Succeeded by: Mike Hoadley

Personal details
- Born: October 8, 1961 (age 65) Beal City, Michigan
- Party: Republican

Roger Hauck (born October 8, 1961) is an American politician who has served in the Michigan Senate from the 34th district since 2023. Roger grew up on a beef and dairy farm and graduated from Beal City High School. He then attended Central Michigan University before starting a 24-year career at The Delfield Company. He also co-owns a small building company.

Prior to serving as state representative, Hauck was elected to serve as a Union Township Trustee.

Hauck was elected in 2016 to the Michigan House of Representatives, and reelected in 2018 and 2020.

Hauck was elected in 2022 to represent Michigan's 34th district in the Michigan Senate. Hauck currently serves as minority vice chair of the Senate Regulatory Affairs Committee and as a member of Health Policy, and Energy & Environment committees.

Following the 2026 Michigan Senate election, Hauck was chosen by the caucus to become the minority leader.

== Electoral history ==
2022 Michigan Senate 34th District General Election
Party	Candidate	Votes	%	±%
Republican	Roger Hauck	71,202	64.4	+5.7
Democratic	Christine Gerace	36,757	33.2	−4.9
U.S. Taxpayers'	Becky McDonald	2,682	2.4	−0.7
Republican hold				

2020 Michigan House of Representatives 99th District General Election
Party	Candidate	Votes	%	±%
Republican	Roger Hauck	24,017	61.1	+9.7
Democratic	John Zang	14,363	36.5	−9.7
Republican hold				

2018 Michigan House of Representatives 99th District General Election
Party	Candidate	Votes	%	±%
Republican	Roger Hauck	16,127	53.4	−0.8
Democratic	Kristen Brown	14,062	46.2	+0.8
Republican hold				

2016 Michigan House of Representatives 99th District General Election
Party	Candidate	Votes	%	±%
Republican	Roger Hauck	18,358	54.6	+3.1
Democratic	Bryan Mielke	12,762	45.4	−3.1
Republican hold				
