= Maple Valley Township, Montcalm County, Michigan =

Maple Valley Township, Michigan
- Township
- Location within Michigan Location within the United States
- Coordinates: 43°19′50″N 85°23′35″W
- Country: United States
- State: Michigan
- County: Montcalm

Area
  - Total: 36.1 sq mi (93 km^{2})
  - Land: 35.3 sq mi (91 km^{2})
  - Water: 0.8 sq mi (2.1 km^{2})
- Elevation: 915 ft (279 m)

Population (2020)
  - Total: 1,908
  - Density: 54/sq mi (21/km^{2})
- Time zone: UTC-5 (Eastern (EST))
  - Summer (DST): UTC-4 (EDT)
- ZIP codes: 49322 (Coral); 49347 (Trufant); 49329 (Howard City); 49339 (Pierson); 49343 (Sand Lake)
- FIPS code: 26-117-51340
- GNIS feature ID: 1626680
- Website: maplevalleytwpmi.gov

Maple Valley Township is a civil township of Montcalm County in the U.S. state of Michigan. The population was 1,908 at the 2020 census.

== Geography ==
The township is in western Montcalm County and is bordered to the south by Kent County. The center of the township is 8 miles (13 km) southeast of Howard City, 17 miles (27 km) west of Stanton, the county seat, and 16 miles (26 km) northwest of Greenville.

According to the U.S. Census Bureau, the township has a total area of 36.1 square miles (93 km^{2}), of which 35.3 square miles (91 km^{2}) are land and 0.8 square miles (2.1 km^{2}), or 2.17%, are water. There are at least 12 named lakes in the township, the largest of which are Cowden Lake in the northeast and Muskellunge Lake in the southeast, next to the community of Trufant. The northern part of the township drains toward Tamarack Creek, a west-flowing tributary of the Little Muskegon River, while the remainder is part of the watershed of the Flat River, a south-flowing tributary of the Grand River.

=== Communities ===
- Colwell was an unincorporated community centered on a station of the Detroit, Lansing and Northern Railroad. It had a post office from 1879 until 1882.
- Coral is an unincorporated community in the northwest part of the township at 43°21′46″N 85°24′10″W. Coral began as a lumber camp organized by Rev. Charles Parker, who purchased land in sections 7 and 9 in 1861. A sawmill built by Morris and Henry Stump was key to its growth, and for a while the place was known as "Stumptown". Parker recorded a plat in 1862 and named it "Coral", reportedly "because it was easy to spell."
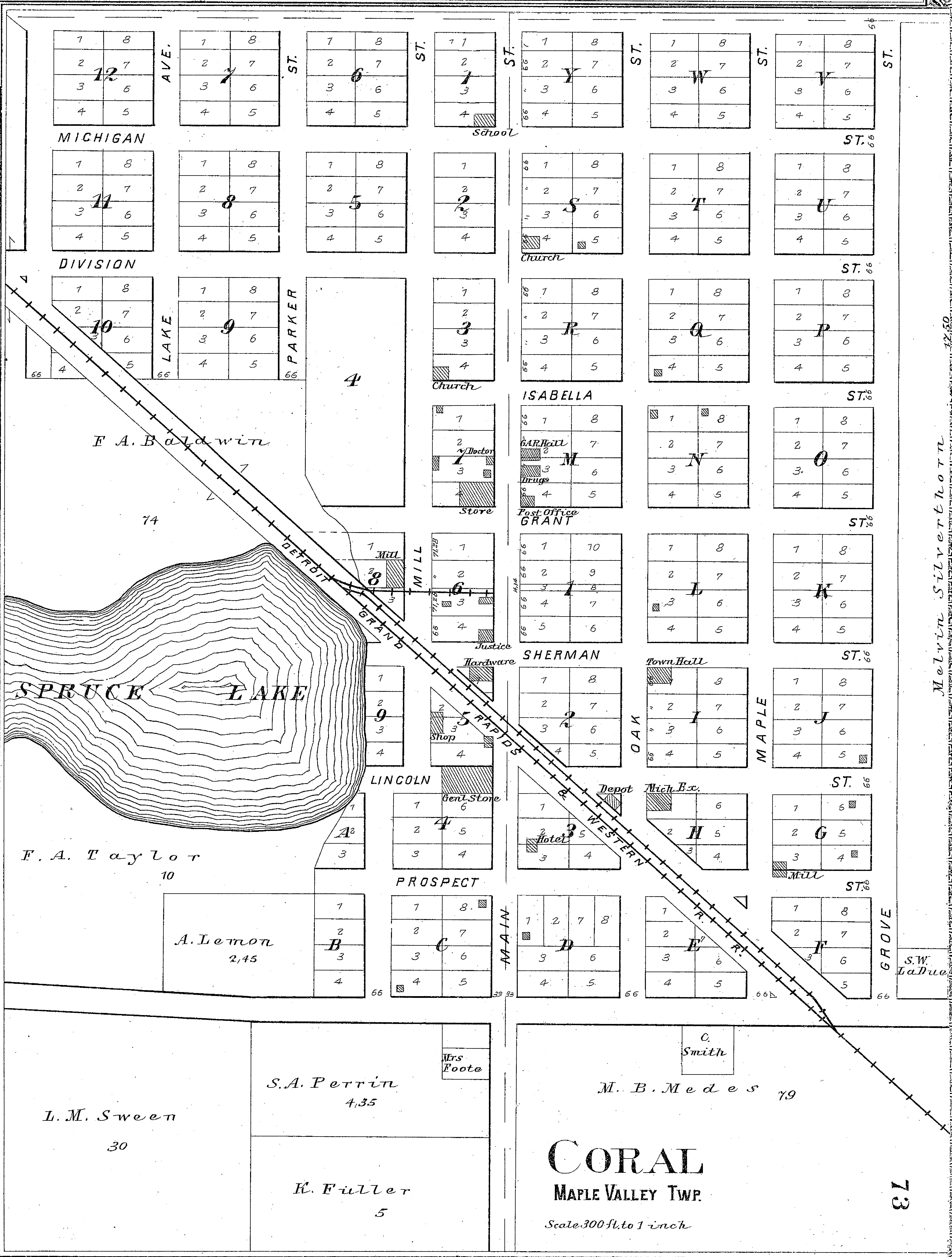
  It was a station on the Detroit, Lansing and Northern Railroad, and John Holcomb became the first postmaster on March 22, 1869. The Coral post office, with ZIP code 49322, serves most of northern Maple Valley Township, as well as portions of Pine Township to the east and Winfield Township to the north.
- Trufant is an unincorporated community and census-designated place in the southeast part of the township. The post office, with ZIP code 49347, serves the southern part of Maple Valley Township, as well as portions of Pine Township to the east and a small area in Spencer Township to the south.

== Demographics ==
Historical population
Census	Pop.	Note	%±
1870	462		—
1880	2,293		396.3%
1890	1,808		−21.2%
1900	1,842		1.9%
1910	1,698		−7.8%
1920	1,472		−13.3%
1930	1,322		−10.2%
1940	1,225		−7.3%
1950	1,213		−1.0%
1960	1,396		15.1%
1970	1,476		5.7%
1980	1,815		23.0%
1990	1,824		0.5%
2000	2,083		14.2%
2010	1,944		−6.7%
2020	1,908		−1.9%
U.S. Decennial Census

As of the census of 2000, there were 2,083 people, 755 households, and 567 families residing in the township. The population density was 58.8 inhabitants per square mile (22.7/km^{2}). There were 910 housing units at an average density of 25.7 per square mile (9.9/km^{2}). The racial makeup of the township was 97.70% White, 0.19% African American, 0.14% Native American, 0.29% Asian, 0.10% Pacific Islander, 0.29% from other races, and 1.30% from two or more races. Hispanic or Latino of any race were 0.82% of the population.

There were 755 households, out of which 34.8% had children under the age of 18 living with them, 61.7% were married couples living together, 7.9% had a female householder with no husband present, and 24.8% were non-families. 20.7% of all households were made up of individuals, and 9.4% had someone living alone who was 65 years of age or older. The average household size was 2.75 and the average family size was 3.20.

In the township the population was spread out, with 29.0% under the age of 18, 8.5% from 18 to 24, 27.1% from 25 to 44, 22.9% from 45 to 64, and 12.6% who were 65 years of age or older. The median age was 35 years. For every 100 females, there were 102.4 males. For every 100 females age 18 and over, there were 104.8 males.

The median income for a household in the township was $36,583, and the median income for a family was $40,433. Males had a median income of $32,738 versus $24,236 for females. The per capita income for the township was $15,163. About 5.1% of families and 7.8% of the population were below the poverty line, including 6.3% of those under age 18 and 9.2% of those age 65 or over.
