= Bill Caul =

American politician (born 1942)

Member of the Michigan House of Representatives from the 99th district
- In office January 1, 2005 – December 31, 2010
- Preceded by: Sandra Caul
- Succeeded by: Kevin Cotter

Personal details
- Party: Republican
- Spouse: Sandra Caul

Bill Caul (born September 2, 1942) is a United States politician, who was a member of the Michigan House of Representatives from 2004 to 2010, representing the 99th District, as a member of the Republican Party.

Caul, formerly a teacher in the Mount Pleasant Public Schools, ran for the seat formerly occupied by his wife, Sandra Caul, after she was forced out by term limits. In November 2004, Caul defeated Democrat Sharon Tilmann, a former mayor of Mount Pleasant and city commissioner.

Caul was a member of the Michigan House of Representatives State Appropriation Committee. Caul won his final term in 2008, defeating Central Michigan University professor Nancy White, the Democratic nominee, and Libertarian Party nominee Devon Smith. Caul's 54 percent of the vote was the lowest percentage of the vote carried by a Republican candidate in the 99th district since his wife's re-election in 2000.

He was term limited in 2010, and was succeeded by Kevin Cotter.

== Electoral history ==
Michigan's 99th state House of Representatives District General Election, 2004
Party	Candidate	Votes	%
Republican	Bill Caul	21,486	56.8
Democratic	Sharon Tillman	16,352	43.2
Republican hold			

Michigan's 99th state House of Representatives District General Election, 2006
Party	Candidate	Votes	%
Republican	Bill Caul (I)	17,198	57.7
Democratic	Loren Partlo	12,632	42.3
Republican hold			

Michigan's 99th state House of Representatives District General Election, 2008
Party	Candidate	Votes	%
Republican	Bill Caul (I)	22,486	54.4
Democratic	Nancy J. White	17,578	42.6
Libertarian	Devon K. Smith	1,244	3.0
Republican hold			
