= Trufant, Michigan =

- Census-designated place
- Nickname: Stump Fence Capital of the World
- Location within Michigan Location within the United States
- Coordinates: 43°19′02″N 85°21′10″W
- Country: United States
- State: Michigan
- County: Montcalm
- Township: Maple Valley

Area
  - Total: 1.12 sq mi (2.89 km^{2})
  - Land: 0.96 sq mi (2.48 km^{2})
  - Water: 0.16 sq mi (0.41 km^{2})
- Elevation: 906 ft (276 m)

Population (2020)
  - Total: 510
  - Density: 532.8/sq mi (205.73/km^{2})
- Time zone: UTC-5 (Eastern (EST))
  - Summer (DST): UTC-4 (EDT)
- ZIP Code: 49347
- FIPS code: 26-80720
- GNIS feature ID: 2804352

Trufant is an unincorporated community and census-designated place (CDP) in Maple Valley Township, Montcalm County, Michigan, United States. As of the 2020 census, the population of Trufant was 510.

== History ==
Emery Trufant built the first water-powered sawmill here in 1872. He sold out to J. B. Hileman and Jacob Hesser, who later built a steam-powered mill on the site. Their firm platted the village of Trufant on March 10, 1875, and named it after Trufant, recognizing him as the first settler.

The community was first listed as a census-designated place prior to the 2020 census.

== Geography ==
Trufant is in western Montcalm County, in the southeast part of Maple Valley Township. It is 11 miles (18 km) southeast of Howard City, 15 miles (24 km) northeast of Cedar Springs, and 13 miles (21 km) northwest of Greenville.

According to the U.S. Census Bureau, the Trufant CDP has a total area of 1.12 square miles (2.90 km^{2}), of which 0.96 square miles (2.49 km^{2}) are land and 0.16 square miles (0.41 km^{2}), or 14.25%, are water. Muskellunge Lake is in the eastern part of the CDP; it drains south through a chain of lakes to Clear Creek and eventually the Flat River, a tributary of the Grand River.

== Demographics ==
Historical population
Census	Pop.	Note	%±
2020	510		—
U.S. Decennial Census
