= Kevin Cotter =

American politician and businessman

72nd Speaker of the Michigan House of Representatives
- In office January 14, 2015 – January 1, 2017
- Preceded by: Jase Bolger
- Succeeded by: Tom Leonard

Member of the Michigan House of Representatives from the 99th district
- In office January 1, 2011 – January 1, 2017
- Preceded by: Bill Caul
- Succeeded by: Roger Hauck

Personal details
- Born: September 26, 1977 (age 48) Mt. Pleasant, Michigan, U.S.
- Party: Republican
- Spouse: Jennifer Cotter
- Education: Central Michigan University (B.S., M.S); WMU Cooley Law School (J.D.)

Kevin M. Cotter (born September 26, 1977) is an American politician who represented the 99th District in the Michigan House of Representatives. He is a member of the Michigan Republican Party. He worked as an attorney in Mt. Pleasant before winning election to the state House in 2010. After serving as chair of the House Judiciary Committee and vice chair of the Elections and Ethics Committee, in November 2014 he was selected by the Republican caucus to serve as Speaker of the Michigan House of Representatives for the 2015-16 legislative session. On September 8, 2016, a federal lawsuit was filed against Representative Cotter (and numerous other defendants) by former State Representative Todd Courser.

== Personal life ==
Cotter is a graduate of Shepherd High School and holds a bachelor's degree in Entrepreneurship and Business Administration, as well as a Master's of Science in Administration, both from Central Michigan University. He also earned a Juris Doctor degree from Western Michigan University Cooley Law School.

== Electoral history ==
Michigan's 99th state House of Representatives District Republican Primary, 2010
Party	Candidate	Votes	%	±%
Republican	Kevin Cotter	6,108	60.7	N/A
Republican	Christine Alwood	3,960	39.3	N/A

Michigan's 99th state House of Representatives District General Election, 2010
Party	Candidate	Votes	%	±%
Republican	Kevin Cotter	16,647	64.4	+10.0
Democratic	Toni Sessoms	9,202	35.6	−7.0
Republican hold				

Michigan's 99th state House of Representatives District General Election, 2012
Party	Candidate	Votes	%	±%
Republican	Kevin Cotter (I)	18,150	57.4	−7.0
Democratic	Adam Lawrence	13,468	42.6	+7.0
Republican hold				

Michigan's 99th state House of Representatives District General Election, 2014
Party	Candidate	Votes	%	±%
Republican	Kevin Cotter (I)	11,347	51.5	−5.9
Democratic	Bryan Mielke	10,676	48.5	+5.9
Republican hold				
