= Nelson Township, Michigan =

- Civil township
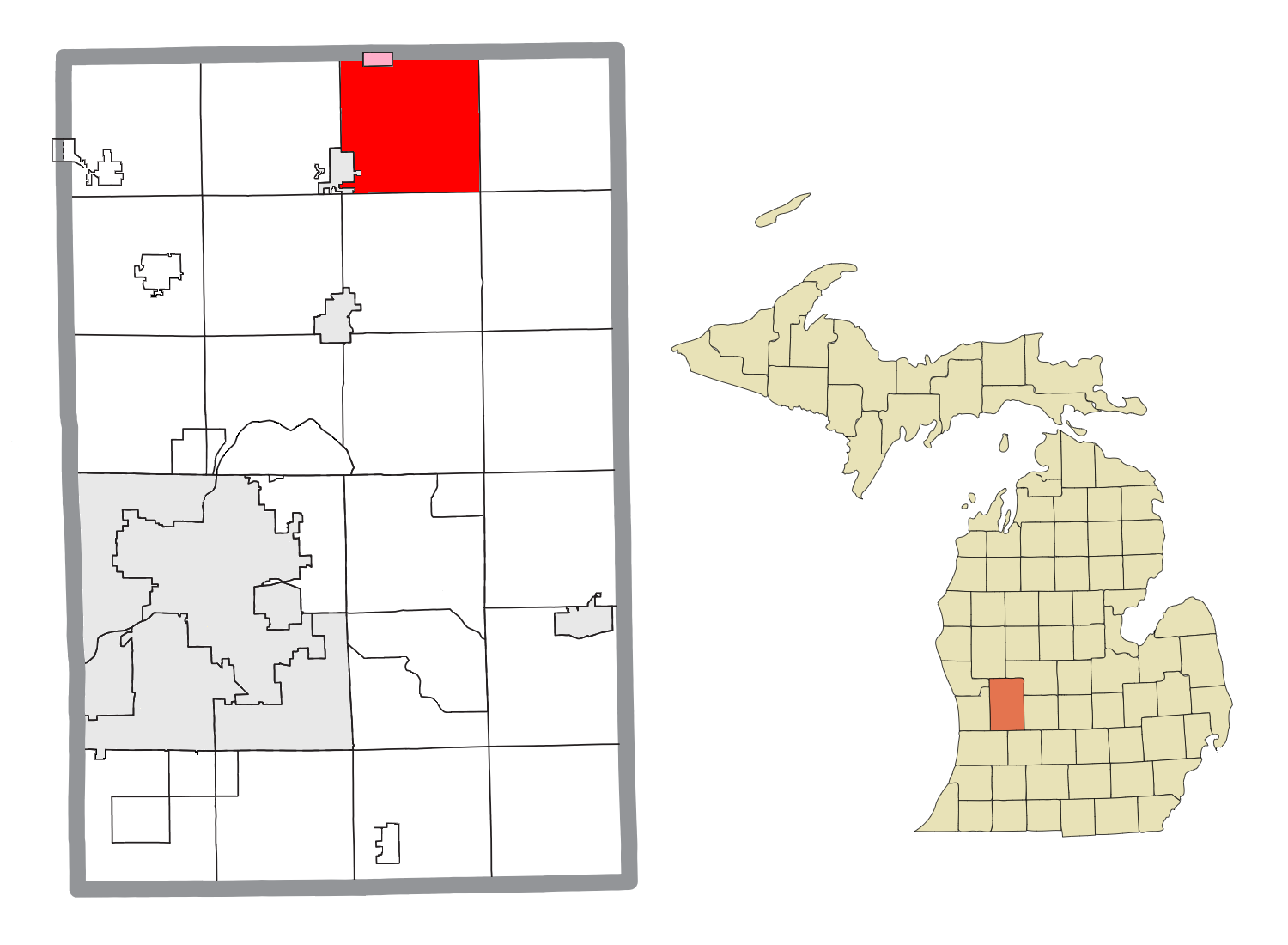
- Location within Kent County (red) and the administered village of Sand Lake (pink)

- Location within the state of Michigan Location within the United States
- Coordinates: 43°16′14″N 85°30′18″W
- Country: United States
- State: Michigan
- County: Kent
- Settled: 1851
- Established: 1854

Government
  - Supervisor: Robyn Britton

Area
  - Total: 35.96 sq mi (93.14 km^{2})
  - Land: 35.21 sq mi (91.19 km^{2})
  - Water: 0.75 sq mi (1.94 km^{2})
- Elevation: 906 ft (276 m)

Population (2020)
  - Total: 4,895
  - Density: 139.0/sq mi (53.68/km^{2})
- Time zone: UTC-5 (Eastern (EST))
  - Summer (DST): UTC-4 (EDT)
- ZIP code(s): 49319 (Cedar Springs); 49343 (Sand Lake)
- Area code: 616
- FIPS code: 26-081-56920
- GNIS feature ID: 1626792
- Website: Official website

Nelson Township is a civil township of Kent County in the U.S. state of Michigan. The population was 4,895 at the 2020 census, which was up from 4,774 at the 2010 census.

It is part of the Grand Rapids metropolitan area and is located about 20 miles (32 km) northeast of the city of Grand Rapids. The village of Sand Lake is located within Nelson Township.

== History ==
The area was first settled in 1851 by William Bailey. The township itself was organized in 1854 and received its first post office on November 26, 1856.

== Geography ==
According to the U.S. Census Bureau, the township has a total area of 35.96 square miles (93.14 km^{2}), of which 35.21 square miles (91.19 km^{2}) is land and 0.75 square miles (1.94 km^{2}) (2.09%) is water.

=== Major highways ===
- US 131 / M-46 is a dual-signed highway that runs north through the northwest corner of the township.

== Demographics ==
As of the census of 2010, there were 4,764 people, 1,427 households, and 1,117 families residing in the township. The population density was 116.4 inhabitants per square mile (44.9/km^{2}). There were 1,499 housing units at an average density of 41.6 per square mile (16.1/km^{2}). The racial makeup of the township was 97.54% White, 0.36% African American, 0.31% Native American, 0.26% Asian, 0.60% from other races, and 0.93% from two or more races. Hispanic or Latino of any race were 1.67% of the population.

There were 1,427 households, out of which 42.3% had children under the age of 18 living with them, 66.2% were married couples living together, 7.4% had a female householder with no husband present, and 21.7% were non-families. 17.9% of all households were made up of individuals, and 6.1% had someone living alone who was 65 years of age or older. The average household size was 2.91 and the average family size was 3.28.

In the township the population was spread out, with 31.8% under the age of 18, 7.1% from 18 to 24, 31.3% from 25 to 44, 22.1% from 45 to 64, and 7.7% who were 65 years of age or older. The median age was 34 years. For every 100 females, there were 102.5 males. For every 100 females age 18 and over, there were 102.3 males.

The median income for a household in the township was $50,521, and the median income for a family was $54,375. Males had a median income of $36,974 versus $25,897 for females. The per capita income for the township was $18,861. About 8.1% of families and 11.7% of the population were below the poverty line, including 10.7% of those under age 18 and 13.4% of those age 65 or over.

== Education ==
Nelson Township is served by two separate school districts. The majority of the township is served by Cedar Springs Public Schools. A smaller northern portion, including the village of Sand Lake, is served by Tri County Area Schools.
