= Mike Hoadley =

American politician from Michigan

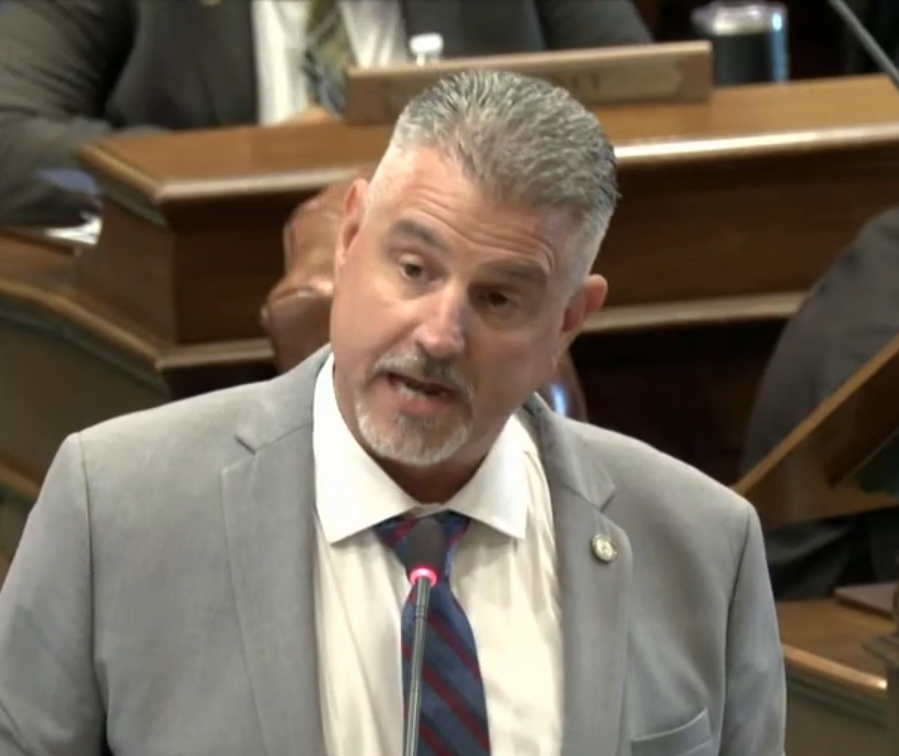
- Hoadley at the Michigan State Capitol, 2025

Member of the Michigan House of Representatives from the 99th district
- Incumbent
- Assumed office January 1, 2023
- Preceded by: Roger Hauck (redistricting)

Personal details
- Born: Flint, Michigan
- Party: Republican
- Education: Delta College (Michigan)

Military service
- Branch: United States Army
- Service years: 1990–1994

Mike Hoadley is an American politician from Michigan who has represented the 99th district in the Michigan House of Representatives since the 2022 election. He was reelected in 2024.

== Early life and education ==
Hoadley graduated from Au Gres Sims High School in 1988. He served in the United States Army from 1990 to 1994. He studied at Delta College.

== See also ==
- Official website at the Michigan House of Representatives
