= Winfield Township, Michigan =

- Township
- Location within Michigan Location within the United States
- Coordinates: 43°25′43″N 85°23′36″W
- Country: United States
- State: Michigan
- County: Montcalm

Area
  - Total: 36.2 sq mi (94 km^{2})
  - Land: 35.4 sq mi (92 km^{2})
  - Water: 0.8 sq mi (2.1 km^{2})
- Elevation: 942 ft (287 m)

Population (2020)
  - Total: 2,279
  - Density: 64.4/sq mi (24.9/km^{2})
- Time zone: UTC-5 (Eastern (EST))
  - Summer (DST): UTC-4 (EDT)
- ZIP Codes: 49329 (Howard City); 49336 (Morley); 48850 (Lakeview); 49322 (Coral)
- FIPS code: 26-117-87880
- GNIS feature ID: 1627280
- Website: winfieldtownshipmi.gov

Winfield Township is a civil township of Montcalm County in the U.S. state of Michigan. As of the 2020 census, the township population was 2,279.

== Geography ==
The township is in northwestern Montcalm County, bordered to the north by Mecosta County. State highway M-46 crosses the center of the township, leading east to Lakeview and west to U.S. Route 131 near Howard City.

According to the United States Census Bureau, the township has a total area of 36.2 square miles (94 km^{2}), of which 35.4 square miles (92 km^{2}) are land and 0.8 square miles (2.1 km^{2}), or 2.17%, are water. The township is drained to the west by tributaries of the Little Muskegon River, most notably Tamarack Creek, which crosses the center of the township.

=== Communities ===
Amble is an unincorporated community in the township on M-46 at 43°25′53″N 85°23′19″W. Located near the center of the township, the community was a station on the Pere Marquette Railroad and was platted and recorded by on July 8, 1886. A post office operated from February 5, 1887, until December 31, 1953. It was named in honor of Rev. Ole Amble, minister in the Danish Lutheran Church.

Decora was an unincorporated community in Winfield Township that had a post office from 1879 until 1880.

== Demographics ==
Historical population
Census	Pop.	Note	%±
1870	326		—
1880	789		142.0%
1890	1,137		44.1%
1900	1,095		−3.7%
1910	982		−10.3%
1920	861		−12.3%
1930	781		−9.3%
1940	783		0.3%
1950	702		−10.3%
1960	684		−2.6%
1970	839		22.7%
1980	1,145		36.5%
1990	1,336		16.7%
2000	2,049		53.4%
2010	2,235		9.1%
2020	2,279		2.0%
U.S. Decennial Census

As of the census of 2000, there were 2,049 people, 709 households, and 560 families residing in the township. The population density was 57.7 inhabitants per square mile (22.3/km^{2}). There were 886 housing units at an average density of 24.9 per square mile (9.6/km^{2}). The racial makeup of the township was 97.32% White, 0.10% African American, 0.34% Native American, 0.39% Asian, 0.44% from other races, and 1.42% from two or more races. Hispanic or Latino of any race were 0.78% of the population.

There were 709 households, out of which 37.4% had children under the age of 18 living with them, 69.7% were married couples living together, 4.9% had a female householder with no husband present, and 20.9% were non-families. 16.5% of all households were made up of individuals, and 5.4% had someone living alone who was 65 years of age or older. The average household size was 2.88 and the average family size was 3.21.

In the township the population was spread out, with 29.6% under the age of 18, 8.2% from 18 to 24, 31.7% from 25 to 44, 21.5% from 45 to 64, and 9.1% who were 65 years of age or older. The median age was 34 years. For every 100 females, there were 107.8 males. For every 100 females age 18 and over, there were 105.3 males.

The median income for a household in the township was $44,524, and the median income for a family was $49,792. Males had a median income of $37,039 versus $25,526 for females. The per capita income for the township was $17,779. About 6.2% of families and 8.6% of the population were below the poverty line, including 11.1% of those under age 18 and 10.0% of those age 65 or over.
