= Pine Township, Michigan =

- Township
- Location within Michigan Location within the United States
- Coordinates: 43°20′0″N 85°15′28″W
- Country: United States
- State: Michigan
- County: Montcalm

Area
  - Total: 36.1 sq mi (93 km^{2})
  - Land: 35.0 sq mi (91 km^{2})
  - Water: 1.1 sq mi (2.8 km^{2})
- Elevation: 950 ft (290 m)

Population (2020)
  - Total: 1,870
  - Density: 53.4/sq mi (20.6/km^{2})
- Time zone: UTC-5 (Eastern (EST))
  - Summer (DST): UTC-4 (EDT)
- ZIP Codes: 48850 (Lakeview); 48888 (Stanton); 49322 (Coral); 49347 (Trufant); 49326 (Gowen); 48838 (Greenville)
- FIPS code: 26-117-64200
- GNIS feature ID: 1626903
- Website: pinetownship.net

Pine Township is a civil township of Montcalm County in the U.S. state of Michigan. The population was 1,870 according to the 2020 census.

== Geography ==
The township is in western Montcalm County and is bordered to the southwest by Kent County. The unincorporated community of Langston is in the southeast part of the township. State highway M-91 crosses the center of the township, leading north to Lakeview and south to Greenville. Stanton, the Montcalm county seat, is to the southeast.

According to the United States Census Bureau, Pine Township has a total area of 36.1 square miles (93 km^{2}), of which 35.0 square miles (91 km^{2}) are land and 1.1 square miles (2.8 km^{2}), or 2.99%, are water. The township is drained by the Flat River, which crosses the southeast part of the township, flowing south toward the Grand River.

== Demographics ==
Historical population
Census	Pop.	Note	%±
1870	283		—
1880	1,029		263.6%
1890	1,072		4.2%
1900	1,186		10.6%
1910	1,114		−6.1%
1920	970		−12.9%
1930	724		−25.4%
1940	758		4.7%
1950	759		0.1%
1960	832		9.6%
1970	984		18.3%
1980	1,224		24.4%
1990	1,392		13.7%
2000	1,654		18.8%
2010	1,834		10.9%
2020	1,870		2.0%
U.S. Decennial Census

At the 2000 census, there were 1,654 people, 610 households and 466 families residing in the township. The population density was 47.0 per square mile (18.1/km^{2}). There were 789 housing units at an average density of 22.4 per square mile (8.6/km^{2}). The racial makeup was 97.52% White, 0.18% African American, 0.60% Native American, 0.12% Asian, 0.48% Pacific Islander, 0.12% from other races, and 0.97% from two or more races. Hispanic or Latino of any race were 0.85% of the population.

There were 610 households, of which 33.8% had children under the age of 18 living with them, 67.5% were married couples living together, 4.4% had a female householder with no husband present, and 23.6% were non-families. 19.7% of all households were made up of individuals, and 6.6% had someone living alone who was 65 years of age or older. The average household size was 2.71 and the average family size was 3.05.

27.9% of the population were under the age of 18, 6.8% from 18 to 24, 29.3% from 25 to 44, 26.3% from 45 to 64, and 9.7% who were 65 years of age or older. The median age was 37 years. For every 100 females, there were 107.0 males. For every 100 females age 18 and over, there were 104.8 males.

The median household income was $41,583 and the median family income was $46,042. Males had a median income of $36,037 and females $22,216. The per capita income was $17,381. About 4.8% of families and 8.5% of the population were below the poverty line, including 13.1% of those under age 18 and 7.2% of those age 65 or over.
