= Pierson, Michigan =

- Village
- Location in Montcalm County and the state of Michigan
- Coordinates: 43°19′11″N 85°29′52″W
- Country: United States
- State: Michigan
- County: Montcalm
- Township: Pierson

Area
  - Total: 0.25 sq mi (0.65 km^{2})
  - Land: 0.25 sq mi (0.65 km^{2})
  - Water: 0 sq mi (0.00 km^{2})
- Elevation: 912 ft (278 m)

Population (2020)
  - Total: 229
  - Density: 918.1/sq mi (354.47/km^{2})
- Time zone: UTC-5 (Eastern (EST))
  - Summer (DST): UTC-4 (EDT)
- ZIP code: 49339
- Area code: 616
- FIPS code: 26-64020
- GNIS feature ID: 2399671

Pierson is a village in Montcalm County in the U.S. state of Michigan. The population was 229 at the 2020 census, up from 172 in 2010. The village is within Pierson Township.

== History ==
In 1856, David S. Pierson acquired 40 acres (16 ha) of land here. With Dexter Clark and John L. Shar, Pierson founded the community while it was still part of Mecosta County. Pierson opened the first post office in his home on January 29, 1857. It was platted in 1870 and incorporated as a village in 1873.

== Geography ==
Pierson is in far western Montcalm County, in the southern part of Pierson Township. The U.S. 131 freeway passes west of the village, with access from Exit 114, 2 miles (3 km) to the northwest. Pierson is 22 miles (35 km) northwest of Greenville and 29 miles (47 km) northwest of Grand Rapids.

According to the U.S. Census Bureau, the village has a total area of 0.25 square miles (0.65 km^{2}), all land.

The Pierson post office, with ZIP code 49339, also serves most of Pierson Township, as well as portions of Maple Valley Township to the east.

== Demographics ==
Historical population
| Census | Pop. | Note | %± |
|---|---|---|---|
| 1880 | 372 | | — |
| 1890 | 215 | | −42.2% |
| 1900 | 215 | | 0.0% |
| 1910 | 183 | | −14.9% |
| 1920 | 164 | | −10.4% |
| 1930 | 144 | | −12.2% |
| 1940 | 147 | | 2.1% |
| 1950 | 169 | | 15.0% |
| 1960 | 219 | | 29.6% |
| 1970 | 193 | | −11.9% |
| 1980 | 216 | | 11.9% |
| 1990 | 207 | | −4.2% |
| 2000 | 185 | | −10.6% |
| 2010 | 172 | | −7.0% |
| 2020 | 229 | | 33.1% |
U.S. Decennial Census

=== 2010 census ===
As of the census of 2010, there were 172 people, 62 households, and 45 families residing in the village. The population density was 688.0 inhabitants per square mile (265.6/km^{2}). There were 73 housing units at an average density of 292.0 per square mile (112.7/km^{2}). The racial makeup of the village was 98.3% White, 0.6% African American, and 1.2% from other races. Hispanic or Latino of any race were 1.7% of the population.

There were 62 households, of which 43.5% had children under the age of 18 living with them, 45.2% were married couples living together, 12.9% had a female householder with no husband present, 14.5% had a male householder with no wife present, and 27.4% were non-families. 19.4% of all households were made up of individuals, and 4.8% had someone living alone who was 65 years of age or older. The average household size was 2.77 and the average family size was 3.16.

The median age in the village was 30.3 years. 29.1% of residents were under the age of 18; 10.5% were between the ages of 18 and 24; 31.9% were from 25 to 44; 21.5% were from 45 to 64; and 7% were 65 years of age or older. The gender makeup of the village was 56.4% male and 43.6% female.

=== 2000 census ===
As of the census of 2000, there were 185 people, 62 households, and 46 families residing in the village. The population density was 730.2 inhabitants per square mile (281.9/km^{2}). There were 73 housing units at an average density of 288.1 per square mile (111.2/km^{2}). The racial makeup of the village was 96.22% White, 1.62% Native American, 0.54% from other races, and 1.62% from two or more races. Hispanic or Latino of any race were 2.16% of the population.

There were 62 households, out of which 41.9% had children under the age of 18 living with them, 59.7% were married couples living together, 6.5% had a female householder with no husband present, and 24.2% were non-families. 16.1% of all households were made up of individuals, and 9.7% had someone living alone who was 65 years of age or older. The average household size was 2.98 and the average family size was 3.38.

In the village, the population was spread out, with 31.4% under the age of 18, 14.1% from 18 to 24, 32.4% from 25 to 44, 15.1% from 45 to 64, and 7.0% who were 65 years of age or older. The median age was 27 years. For every 100 females, there were 103.3 males. For every 100 females age 18 and over, there were 108.2 males.

The median income for a household in the village was $37,500, and the median income for a family was $39,000. Males had a median income of $29,063 versus $17,500 for females. The per capita income for the village was $10,456. About 8.7% of families and 11.8% of the population were below the poverty line, including 10.5% of those under the age of eighteen and 12.5% of those 65 or over.

== Education ==
Tri County Area Schools, which operates Tri County High School, serves Pierson.
