= Howard City, Michigan =

- Village
- Location in Montcalm County and the state of Michigan
- Coordinates: 43°23′41″N 85°28′06″W
- Country: United States
- State: Michigan
- County: Montcalm
- Townships: Reynolds, Pierson
- Founded: 1868
- Incorporated: 1873 (village)

Area
  - Total: 2.45 sq mi (6.34 km^{2})
  - Land: 2.41 sq mi (6.25 km^{2})
  - Water: 0.035 sq mi (0.09 km^{2})
- Elevation: 879 ft (268 m)

Population (2020)
  - Total: 1,835
  - Density: 759.9/sq mi (293.41/km^{2})
- Time zone: UTC-5 (Eastern (EST))
  - Summer (DST): UTC-4 (EDT)
- ZIP code: 49329
- Area code: 231
- FIPS code: 26-39500
- GNIS feature ID: 2398547
- Website: www.howardcity.org

Howard City is a village in Montcalm County, Michigan, United States. The population was 1,835 at the 2020 census. The village is within Reynolds Township.

== History ==
Benjamin Ensley owned the land on which he, E. W. Muenscher, and Mr. Shaw began the settlement that Muenscher platted in 1868. It was named for William A. Howard, a Detroit railroad attorney. The Detroit, Grand Rapids and Western Railroad depot opened in 1869. A post office was established on January 12, 1870, with John B. Spencer as the first postmaster. It incorporated as a village in 1873. The post office name was shortened to "Howard" on February 2, 1895, but restored to Howard City on January 19, 1899.

The village's Main Street was initially constructed on Ensley Street, which was named after early settler Benjamin Ensley. In 1883, however, many of the wooden buildings on Ensley Street burned down. Main Street was then shifted over to Edgerton Street, its present location. The Hudson Knife factory and the Skinner and Steenman sideboard factory were two of the earliest businesses. Later, Hudson Knife Co. went through changes and became the Joslin and eventually Olsen Knife Company, which had the somewhat famous jingle, "Fatty Fatty run for your life, here comes Skinny with an Olsen Knife." Howard City schools were combined with Sand Lake schools to the south in 1962, and renamed Tri County, because students from Kent, Montcalm, and Newaygo counties all attended. The school still runs under the same moniker.

== Geography ==
Howard City is in northwestern Montcalm County, in the southeast corner of Reynolds Township. A small portion of the village extends south into Pierson Township. The U.S. 131 freeway passes 2 miles (3 km) west of the village, with access from Exit 118. U.S. 131 leads south-southwest 34 miles (55 km) to Grand Rapids and north 63 miles (101 km) to Cadillac. Greenville, the largest city in Montcalm County, is 25 miles (40 km) southeast of Howard City.

According to the U.S. Census Bureau, the village has a total area of 2.44 square miles (6.32 km^{2}), of which 0.03 square miles (0.08 km^{2}), or 1.39%, are water. Tamarack Creek, a west-flowing tributary of the Little Muskegon River, passes through the north side of the village.

The Howard City post office, with ZIP code 49329, also serves much of southern Reynolds Township, as well as a large part of Winfield Township to the east, a small area of Maple Valley Township to the southeast, portions of Pierson Township to the south. It also serves parts of Croton Township to the west and Ensley Township to the southwest in Newaygo County.

== Demographics ==
Historical population
Census	Pop.	Note	%±
1880	924		—
1890	1,137		23.1%
1900	1,398		23.0%
1910	1,046		−25.2%
1920	913		−12.7%
1930	872		−4.5%
1940	839		−3.8%
1950	791		−5.7%
1960	1,004		26.9%
1970	1,060		5.6%
1980	1,118		5.5%
1990	1,351		20.8%
2000	1,585		17.3%
2010	1,808		14.1%
2020	1,835		1.5%
U.S. Decennial Census

=== 2020 census ===
As of the 2020 census, Howard City had a population of 1,835. The median age was 32.2 years. 27.8% of residents were under the age of 18 and 13.4% of residents were 65 years of age or older. For every 100 females there were 91.9 males, and for every 100 females age 18 and over there were 90.5 males age 18 and over.

0.0% of residents lived in urban areas, while 100.0% lived in rural areas.

There were 696 households in Howard City, of which 38.5% had children under the age of 18 living in them. Of all households, 41.5% were married-couple households, 15.9% were households with a male householder and no spouse or partner present, and 29.5% were households with a female householder and no spouse or partner present. About 26.8% of all households were made up of individuals and 12.5% had someone living alone who was 65 years of age or older.

There were 744 housing units, of which 6.5% were vacant. The homeowner vacancy rate was 3.6% and the rental vacancy rate was 6.3%.

Racial composition as of the 2020 census
Race	Number	Percent
White	1,653	90.1%
Black or African American	16	0.9%
American Indian and Alaska Native	11	0.6%
Asian	3	0.2%
Native Hawaiian and Other Pacific Islander	0	0.0%
Some other race	11	0.6%
Two or more races	141	7.7%
Hispanic or Latino (of any race)	60	3.3%

=== 2010 census ===
As of the census of 2010, there were 1,808 people, 685 households, and 464 families residing in the village. The population density was 714.6 inhabitants per square mile (275.9/km^{2}). There were 743 housing units at an average density of 293.7 per square mile (113.4/km^{2}). The racial makeup of the village was 96.3% White, 0.6% African American, 0.6% Native American, 0.2% Asian, 0.8% from other races, and 1.5% from two or more races. Hispanic or Latino of any race were 2.4% of the population.

There were 685 households, of which 39.7% had children under the age of 18 living with them, 45.1% were married couples living together, 17.4% had a female householder with no husband present, 5.3% had a male householder with no wife present, and 32.3% were non-families. 26.4% of all households were made up of individuals, and 10.9% had someone living alone who was 65 years of age or older. The average household size was 2.63 and the average family size was 3.13.

The median age in the village was 33.6 years. 29.4% of residents were under the age of 18; 9.1% were between the ages of 18 and 24; 26.9% were from 25 to 44; 21.8% were from 45 to 64; and 12.9% were 65 years of age or older. The gender makeup of the village was 46.6% male and 53.4% female.

=== 2000 census ===
As of the census of 2000, there were 1,585 people, 576 households, and 410 families residing in the village. The population density was 631.5 inhabitants per square mile (243.8/km^{2}). There were 626 housing units at an average density of 249.4 per square mile (96.3/km^{2}). The racial makeup of the village was 95.90% White, 0.19% African American, 0.57% Native American, 0.13% Asian, 0.95% from other races, and 2.27% from two or more races. Hispanic or Latino of any race were 2.59% of the population.

There were 576 households, out of which 38.7% had children under the age of 18 living with them, 52.4% were married couples living together, 14.1% had a female householder with no husband present, and 28.8% were non-families. 25.2% of all households were made up of individuals, and 13.9% had someone living alone who was 65 years of age or older. The average household size was 2.75 and the average family size was 3.22.

In the village, the population was spread out, with 32.3% under the age of 18, 8.9% from 18 to 24, 27.9% from 25 to 44, 17.7% from 45 to 64, and 13.2% who were 65 years of age or older. The median age was 32 years. For every 100 females, there were 84.9 males. For every 100 females age 18 and over, there were 83.4 males.

The median income for a household in the village was $34,556, and the median income for a family was $41,250. Males had a median income of $32,241 versus $22,917 for females. The per capita income for the village was $14,076. About 5.7% of families and 10.4% of the population were below the poverty line, including 13.4% of those under age 18 and 13.1% of those age 65 or over.

== Transportation ==
- Indian Trails provides daily intercity bus service between Grand Rapids, Michigan and Petoskey, Michigan.

== Schools ==
Tri County Area Schools is the main school district in Howard City. Schools include Tri County High School, Tri County Middle School, MacNaughten Elementary, Sand Lake Elementary and Edgerton Upper Elementary. The School mascot is the Viking. Sports include football, basketball, softball, baseball, wrestling, sideline cheer, competitive cheer, golf, track and field, cross country, bowling, poms and soccer. In 2009, the varsity softball team took a District title, but fell short at regionals to Petosky. Neighboring schools include Newaygo, Grant, Morley-Stanwood, Lakeview and Cedar Springs.

The district was a consolidation of the Sand Lake and Howard City school boards. It came into existence on April 3, 1962, the day members of those communities voted in favor of consolidating their schools. The consolidated schools began operation in fall 1962. Prior to the consolidation, Howard City High School served the community. Impetus for consolidation occurred when the State of Michigan adopted new standards for education which required school systems to spend additional funds. A former member of the school board of Sand Lake, Charles Northup, stated, "Howard City was almost in the same predicament as us. We figured we would have a good school system coming together." Sand Lake was a community which sought consolidation due to the financial strain from meeting the new requirements.
