= Morley, Michigan =

- Village
- Location of Morley, Michigan
- Coordinates: 43°29′27″N 85°26′38″W
- Country: United States
- State: Michigan
- County: Mecosta
- Townships: Aetna, Deerfield

Area
  - Total: 0.99 sq mi (2.56 km^{2})
  - Land: 0.90 sq mi (2.32 km^{2})
  - Water: 0.097 sq mi (0.25 km^{2})
- Elevation: 915 ft (279 m)

Population (2020)
  - Total: 517
  - Density: 577.7/sq mi (223.04/km^{2})
- Time zone: UTC-5 (Eastern (EST))
  - Summer (DST): UTC-4 (EDT)
- ZIP code: 49336
- Area code: 231
- FIPS code: 26-55540
- GNIS feature ID: 1620897
- Website: http://villageofmorley.com/

Morley is a village in Mecosta County in the U.S. state of Michigan. The population was 517 at the 2020 census.

== Geography ==
Morley is in southwestern Mecosta County on the border between Aetna Township to the west and Deerfield Township to the east. It is 18 miles (29 km) south of Big Rapids, the county seat, and 7 miles (11 km) north of Howard City.

According to the United States Census Bureau, Morley village has a total area of 0.99 square miles (2.56 km^{2}), of which 0.90 square miles (2.33 km^{2}) are land and 0.10 square miles (0.26 km^{2}), or 9.60%, are water. The Little Muskegon River flows southwesterly through the southeast part of the village, where it is impounded to form Morley Pond.

== Demographics ==
Historical population
| Census | Pop. | Note | %± |
|---|---|---|---|
| 1880 | 299 | | — |
| 1890 | 485 | | 62.2% |
| 1900 | 334 | | −31.1% |
| 1910 | 337 | | 0.9% |
| 1920 | 336 | | −0.3% |
| 1930 | 322 | | −4.2% |
| 1940 | 366 | | 13.7% |
| 1950 | 413 | | 12.8% |
| 1960 | 445 | | 7.7% |
| 1970 | 481 | | 8.1% |
| 1980 | 507 | | 5.4% |
| 1990 | 528 | | 4.1% |
| 2000 | 495 | | −6.2% |
| 2010 | 493 | | −0.4% |
| 2020 | 517 | | 4.9% |
U.S. Decennial Census

=== 2010 census ===
As of the census of 2010, there were 493 people, 182 households, and 115 families residing in the village. The population density was 547.8 inhabitants per square mile (211.5/km^{2}). There were 223 housing units at an average density of 247.8 per square mile (95.7/km^{2}). The racial makeup of the village was 94.3% White, 1.0% African American, 0.6% Native American, 0.4% Asian, 1.0% from other races, and 2.6% from two or more races. Hispanic or Latino of any race were 5.7% of the population.

There were 182 households, of which 35.2% had children under the age of 18 living with them, 40.7% were married couples living together, 17.6% had a female householder with no husband present, 4.9% had a male householder with no wife present, and 36.8% were non-families. 28.0% of all households were made up of individuals, and 17.6% had someone living alone who was 65 years of age or older. The average household size was 2.71 and the average family size was 3.28.

The median age in the village was 33.6 years. 30% of residents were under the age of 18; 7.7% were between the ages of 18 and 24; 24% were from 25 to 44; 24% were from 45 to 64; and 14.4% were 65 years of age or older. The gender makeup of the village was 46.7% male and 53.3% female.

=== 2000 census ===
As of the census of 2000, there were 495 people, 194 households, and 120 families residing in the village. The population density was 536.9 inhabitants per square mile (207.3/km^{2}). There were 218 housing units at an average density of 236.5 per square mile (91.3/km^{2}). The racial makeup of the village was 97.58% White, 0.20% African American, 1.01% Native American, 0.20% Asian, 0.20% from other races, and 0.81% from two or more races. Hispanic or Latino of any race were 0.40% of the population.

There were 194 households, out of which 35.1% had children under the age of 18 living with them, 42.8% were married couples living together, 13.9% had a female householder with no husband present, and 38.1% were non-families. 30.9% of all households were made up of individuals, and 14.9% had someone living alone who was 65 years of age or older. The average household size was 2.55 and the average family size was 3.16.

In the village, the population was spread out, with 31.7% under the age of 18, 6.3% from 18 to 24, 26.9% from 25 to 44, 21.6% from 45 to 64, and 13.5% who were 65 years of age or older. The median age was 35 years. For every 100 females, there were 76.2 males. For every 100 females age 18 and over, there were 77.0 males.

The median income for a household in the village was $31,442, and the median income for a family was $34,688. Males had a median income of $28,750 versus $18,438 for females. The per capita income for the village was $11,634. About 11.3% of families and 17.7% of the population were below the poverty line, including 15.6% of those under age 18 and 19.7% of those age 65 or over.

== Transportation ==
- Indian Trails provides daily intercity bus service between Grand Rapids and Petoskey, Michigan.
- Bus service between Morley and nearby cities is also provided by the Mecosta Osceola Transit Authority (MOTA).
- A portion of the Fred Meijer White Pine Trail State Park extends through Morley at mile marker 35. A multi-use trail constructed on the former Grand Rapids and Indiana Railroad bed, the trail runs 92 miles (148 km) from Comstock Park near Grand Rapids on the south to Cadillac on the north. It is used primarily by bicyclists in the summer and by snowmobilers in the winter.
