= Paris, Michigan =

- Census-designated place (CDP) & unincorporated community
- Location within the state of Michigan Location within the United States
- Coordinates: 43°46′25″N 85°30′11″W
- Country: United States
- State: Michigan
- County: Mecosta
- Township: Green
- Settled: 1851

Area
  - Total: 0.89 sq mi (2.31 km^{2})
  - Land: 0.86 sq mi (2.23 km^{2})
  - Water: 0.031 sq mi (0.08 km^{2})
- Elevation: 935 ft (285 m)

Population (2020)
  - Total: 271
  - Density: 315.12/sq mi (121.67/km^{2})
- Time zone: UTC-5 (Eastern (EST))
  - Summer (DST): UTC-4 (EDT)
- ZIP code(s): 49338
- Area code: 231
- FIPS code: 26-62400
- GNIS feature ID: 2804350

Paris is an unincorporated community and census-designated place (CDP) in Green Charter Township, Mecosta County, Michigan, United States. The population was 271 at the 2020 census, the first which recorded data specifically for the community.

== History ==
John Parish is considered the "father" of the village, having arrived in the 1850s and then platting the village in 1865. It was at first named "Parish" after him, but the name later became Paris. A fire on May 26, 1879, destroyed a large portion of the village, including records of Green Township. The Paris ZIP code, 49338, serves the northwest portion of Green Township.

Paris Park, at the northern edge of the community, was the site of the second fish hatchery in the state of Michigan. The Paris Fish Hatchery opened in 1881, and from 1913 to 1938, salmon and brown trout fingerlings were shipped by rail baggage cars in milk cans painted a distinctive red. The Works Progress Administration renovated and expanded the facility in the mid-1930s. The hatchery operated until 1964, and in 1972 was acquired by the Mecosta County Park Commission and refurbished as a park that reopened in July 1976. In 1980, students from the Mecosta-Osceola Career Center in Big Rapids built a 20-foot-tall (6.1 m) replica of the Eiffel Tower out of metal frames from WPA workers' beds that had been stored in barns.

== Geography ==
Paris is in northwestern Mecosta County, slightly north of the center of Green Township. It is bordered to the east by the Muskegon River, a south-flowing tributary of Lake Michigan. Big Rapids, the Mecosta county seat, is 6 miles (10 km) to the south, and Reed City is 7 miles (11 km) to the north.

According to the U.S. Census Bureau, the Paris CDP has a total area of 0.9 square miles (2.3 km^{2}), of which 0.03 square miles (0.08 km^{2}), or 2.94%, are water.
