= Pierson Township, Michigan =

- Township
- Location within Michigan Location within the United States
- Coordinates: 43°19′42″N 85°30′30″W
- Country: United States
- State: Michigan
- County: Montcalm

Area
  - Total: 36.2 sq mi (94 km^{2})
  - Land: 34.6 sq mi (90 km^{2})
  - Water: 1.6 sq mi (4.1 km^{2})
- Elevation: 965 ft (294 m)

Population (2020)
  - Total: 3,363
  - Density: 97.1/sq mi (37.5/km^{2})
- Time zone: UTC-5 (Eastern (EST))
  - Summer (DST): UTC-4 (EDT)
- ZIP codes: 49339 (Pierson); 49329 (Howard City); 49343 (Sand Lake)
- Area code: 616
- FIPS code: 26-117-64040
- GNIS feature ID: 1626900
- Website: www.piersontwp.org

Pierson Township is a civil township of Montcalm County in the U.S. state of Michigan. The population was 3,363 at the 2020 census. The village of Pierson is located within the township.

== History ==
The historical tribes inhabiting the region were the Ottawa, Chippewa and Potawatomi. Settlers began arriving in the 1830s.

== Geography ==
The township is in far western Montcalm County, bordered to the west by Newaygo County and to the south by Kent County. The village of Pierson is in the southern part of the township. U.S. Route 131 crosses the township, leading north 27 miles (43 km) to Big Rapids and southwest the same distance to Grand Rapids.

According to the U.S. Census Bureau, the township has a total area of 36.2 square miles (94 km^{2}), of which 34.6 square miles (90 km^{2}) are land and 1.6 square miles (4.1 km^{2}), or 4.37%, are water. Several natural lakes, including Whitefish Lake and Little Whitefish Lake, are in the western part of the township.

== Demographics ==
Historical population
Census	Pop.	Note	%±
1870	755		—
1880	1,572		108.2%
1890	1,410		−10.3%
1900	1,250		−11.3%
1910	1,129		−9.7%
1920	929		−17.7%
1930	802		−13.7%
1940	805		0.4%
1950	857		6.5%
1960	964		12.5%
1970	1,261		30.8%
1980	1,701		34.9%
1990	2,177		28.0%
2000	2,866		31.6%
2010	3,216		12.2%
2020	3,363		4.6%
U.S. Decennial Census

As of the census of 2000, there were 2,866 people, 1,015 households, and 795 families residing in the township. The population density was 82.6 inhabitants per square mile (31.9/km^{2}). There were 1,343 housing units at an average density of 38.7 per square mile (14.9/km^{2}). The racial makeup of the township was 96.27% White, 0.07% African American, 0.87% Native American, 0.28% Asian, 0.10% Pacific Islander, 0.59% from other races, and 1.81% from two or more races. Hispanic or Latino of any race were 1.36% of the population.

There were 1,015 households, out of which 40.8% had children under the age of 18 living with them, 68.1% were married couples living together, 5.9% had a female householder with no husband present, and 21.6% were non-families. 16.9% of all households were made up of individuals, and 5.7% had someone living alone who was 65 years of age or older. The average household size was 2.82 and the average family size was 3.18.

In the township the population was spread out, with 30.4% under the age of 18, 6.9% from 18 to 24, 30.5% from 25 to 44, 23.4% from 45 to 64, and 8.8% who were 65 years of age or older. The median age was 35 years. For every 100 females, there were 103.1 males. For every 100 females age 18 and over, there were 102.8 males.

The median income for a household in the township was $48,519, and the median income for a family was $50,573. Males had a median income of $36,921 versus $27,344 for females. The per capita income for the township was $19,216. About 3.4% of families and 5.0% of the population were below the poverty line, including 3.4% of those under age 18 and 5.7% of those age 65 or over.

== Education ==
Tri County Area Schools serves the township. Tri County High School and Tri County Middle School are in the township.
