= Ensley Township, Michigan =

- Township
- Location within the state of Michigan Ensley Township, Michigan (the United States)
- Coordinates: 43°19′50″N 85°37′56″W
- Country: United States
- State: Michigan
- County: Newaygo

Area
  - Total: 36.1 sq mi (93.5 km^{2})
  - Land: 35.7 sq mi (92.4 km^{2})
  - Water: 0.42 sq mi (1.1 km^{2})
- Elevation: 932 ft (284 m)

Population (2020)
  - Total: 2,603
  - Density: 73.0/sq mi (28.2/km^{2})
- Time zone: UTC-5 (Eastern (EST))
  - Summer (DST): UTC-4 (EDT)
- FIPS code: 26-26160
- GNIS feature ID: 1626243

Ensley Township is a civil township of Newaygo County in the U.S. state of Michigan. The population was 2,603 at the 2020 census.

== Geography ==
According to the United States Census Bureau, the township has a total area of 36.1 square miles (93 km^{2}), of which 35.7 square miles (92 km^{2}) is land and 0.4 square miles (1.0 km^{2}) (1.14%) is water.

== History ==
Ensley Township was established in 1858.

== Demographics ==
As of the census of 2000, there were 2,474 people, 841 households, and 686 families residing in the township. The population density was 69.3 inhabitants per square mile (26.8/km^{2}). There were 939 housing units at an average density of 26.3 per square mile (10.2/km^{2}). The racial makeup of the township was 96.52% White, 0.28% African American, 0.57% Native American, 0.16% Asian, 0.93% from other races, and 1.54% from two or more races. Hispanic or Latino of any race were 2.02% of the population.

There were 841 households, out of which 43.3% had children under the age of 18 living with them, 69.4% were married couples living together, 7.5% had a female householder with no husband present, and 18.4% were non-families. 14.9% of all households were made up of individuals, and 4.4% had someone living alone who was 65 years of age or older. The average household size was 2.94 and the average family size was 3.25.

In the township the population was spread out, with 31.8% under the age of 18, 7.3% from 18 to 24, 32.3% from 25 to 44, 21.2% from 45 to 64, and 7.4% who were 65 years of age or older. The median age was 34 years. For every 100 females, there were 107.6 males. For every 100 females age 18 and over, there were 106.9 males.

The median income for a household in the township was $47,993, and the median income for a family was $50,104. Males had a median income of $40,507 versus $22,317 for females. The per capita income for the township was $17,845. About 7.5% of families and 6.5% of the population were below the poverty line, including 5.7% of those under age 18 and 8.5% of those age 65 or over.

== See also ==
- Grant Public School District
