= Sand Lake, Michigan =

- Village
- Village of Sand Lake
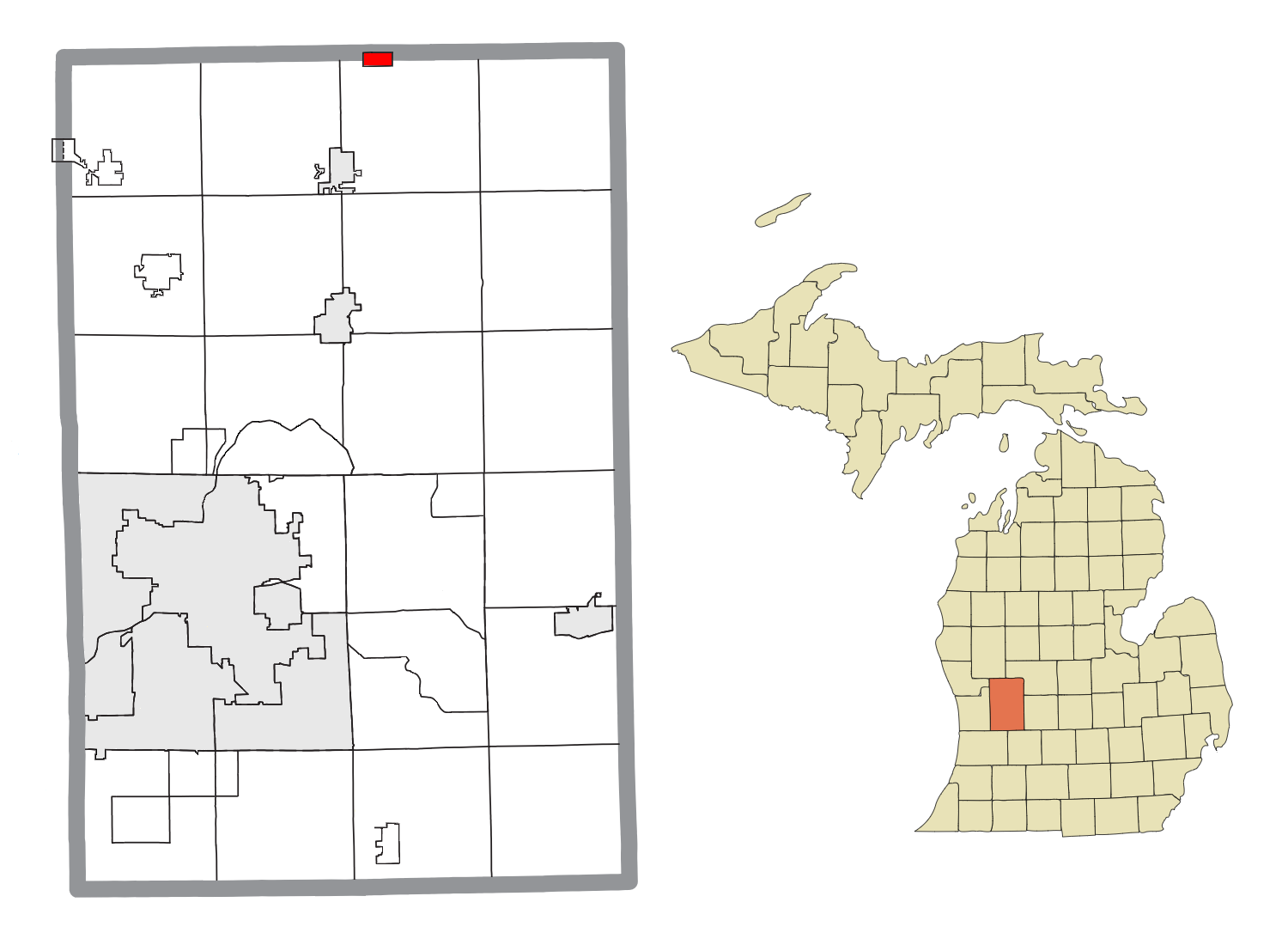
- Location within Kent County

- Location within the state of Michigan Location within the United States
- Coordinates: 43°17′31″N 85°31′06″W
- Country: United States
- State: Michigan
- County: Kent
- Founded: 1869

Government
  - Type: Village council
  - President: Mollie Doerr
  - Clerk: Donna Westerbrink

Area
  - Total: 0.74 sq mi (1.92 km^{2})
  - Land: 0.71 sq mi (1.84 km^{2})
  - Water: 0.031 sq mi (0.08 km^{2})
- Elevation: 915 ft (279 m)

Population (2020)
  - Total: 522
  - Density: 735.8/sq mi (284.08/km^{2})
- Time zone: UTC-5 (Eastern (EST))
  - Summer (DST): UTC-4 (EDT)
- ZIP code(s): 49343
- Area code: 616
- FIPS code: 26-71360
- GNIS feature ID: 1675442
- Website: Official website

Sand Lake is a village in Kent County in the U.S. state of Michigan. It is located in Nelson Township. The population was 522 at the 2020 census.

== History ==
The village of Sand Lake was founded in 1869 in northern Kent County and has long served as a bedroom community about 25 miles (40.2 km) northeast of the city of Grand Rapids. In 2009, the village had the highest tax rates of the five villages in Kent County, and some residents petitioned for a vote to have the village disincorporated in order to lower taxes. This proposal was defeated, and Sand Lake continued as an incorporated village. For years, the village operated its own police department, but the department was dissolved by the village council in 2019. This followed, among other things, complaints made by a police officer, alleging that internal misconduct was afoot. Simultaneously, the village maintained a fire department which also served a portion of Nelson Township, and Ensley Township in Newaygo County.

== Geography ==
According to the U.S. Census Bureau, the village has a total area of 0.74 square miles (1.92 km^{2}), of which 0.71 square miles (1.84 km^{2}) is land and 0.03 square miles (0.08 km^{2}) (4.05%) is water.

== Demographics ==
Historical population
Census	Pop.	Note	%±
1880	581		—
1890	386		−33.6%
1900	326		−15.5%
1910	370		13.5%
1920	366		−1.1%
1930	358		−2.2%
1940	365		2.0%
1950	394		7.9%
1960	394		0.0%
1970	380		−3.6%
1980	388		2.1%
1990	456		17.5%
2000	492		7.9%
2010	500		1.6%
2020	522		4.4%
U.S. Decennial Census

=== 2010 census ===
As of the census of 2010, there were 500 people, 188 households, and 116 families living in the village. The population density was 625 per square mile. There were 211 housing units at an average density of 263.75 per square mile. The racial makeup of the village was 94.6% White, 0.80% African American, 0.2% Native American, 1% Asian, 1.4% from other races, and 2% from two or more races. Hispanic or Latino of any race were 5.2% of the population.

There were 188 households, of which 34% had children under the age of 18 living with them, 39.9% were married couples living together, 14.4% had a female householder with no husband present, and 38.3% were non-families. 33% of all households were made up of individuals, and 26.1% had someone living alone who was 65 years of age or older. The average household size was 2.66 and the average family size was 3.34.

In the village, the population was spread out, with 33% under the age of 20, 7% from 20 to 24, 23.4% from 25 to 44, 24.8% from 45 to 64, and 11.8% who were 65 years of age or older. The median age was 33.2 years. For every 100 females, there were 65.29 males. For every 100 females age 20 and over, there were 95.91 males.

=== 2000 census ===
As of the census of 2000, there were 492 people, 184 households, and 110 families living in the village. The population density was 670.5 inhabitants per square mile (258.9/km^{2}). There were 207 housing units at an average density of 282.1 per square mile (108.9/km^{2}). The racial makeup of the village was 96.34% White, 0.20% African American, 1.22% Native American, 0.81% Asian, 1.02% from other races, and 0.41% from two or more races. Hispanic or Latino of any race were 1.02% of the population.

There were 184 households, out of which 35.9% had children under the age of 18 living with them, 47.3% were married couples living together, 9.8% had a female householder with no husband present, and 40.2% were non-families. 34.2% of all households were made up of individuals, and 19.6% had someone living alone who was 65 years of age or older. The average household size was 2.64 and the average family size was 3.43.

In the village, the population was spread out, with 32.1% under the age of 18, 8.3% from 18 to 24, 28.7% from 25 to 44, 15.0% from 45 to 64, and 15.9% who were 65 years of age or older. The median age was 33 years. For every 100 females, there were 85.7 males. For every 100 females age 18 and over, there were 80.5 males.

The median income for a household in the village was $31,875, and the median income for a family was $46,250. Males had a median income of $27,500 versus $21,985 for females. The per capita income for the village was $14,184. About 9.3% of families and 14.5% of the population were below the poverty line, including 9.0% of those under age 18 and 34.0% of those age 65 or over.

== Education ==
Tri County Area Schools, which operates Tri County High School, serves Sand Lake. The district was a consolidation of the Sand Lake and Howard City school boards. It came into existence on April 3, 1962, the day members of those communities voted in favor of consolidating their schools. The consolidated schools began operation in fall 1962.

Prior to the consolidation, Sand Lake High School, a K-12 school, served the community. Impetus for consolidation occurred when the State of Michigan adopted new standards for education which required school systems to spend additional funds. Some Sand Lake residents wished to consolidate with Cedar Springs Schools in Cedar Springs due to the strength of the Cedar Springs industrial economy and the good reputation of its school system, while others wished to consolidate with Howard City. Charles Northup, a former member of the Sand Lake school board, stated that Cedar Springs residents would have had primary control and naming of a consolidated school district including Sand Lake, while a consolidation with Howard City would result in joint control between the communities. According to a former principal of Sand Lake High, Earl Clegg, "community friction" occurred in the consolidation debate. About 300 people went to a meeting in Sand Lake on proposed school consolidation on February 13, 1961.

The Nelson Township Branch of the Kent District Library is located in Sand Lake.

== Notable people ==
- Dick Terwilliger — MLB pitcher
