= Little Muskegon River =

Coordinates: 43°26′30″N 85°39′46″W

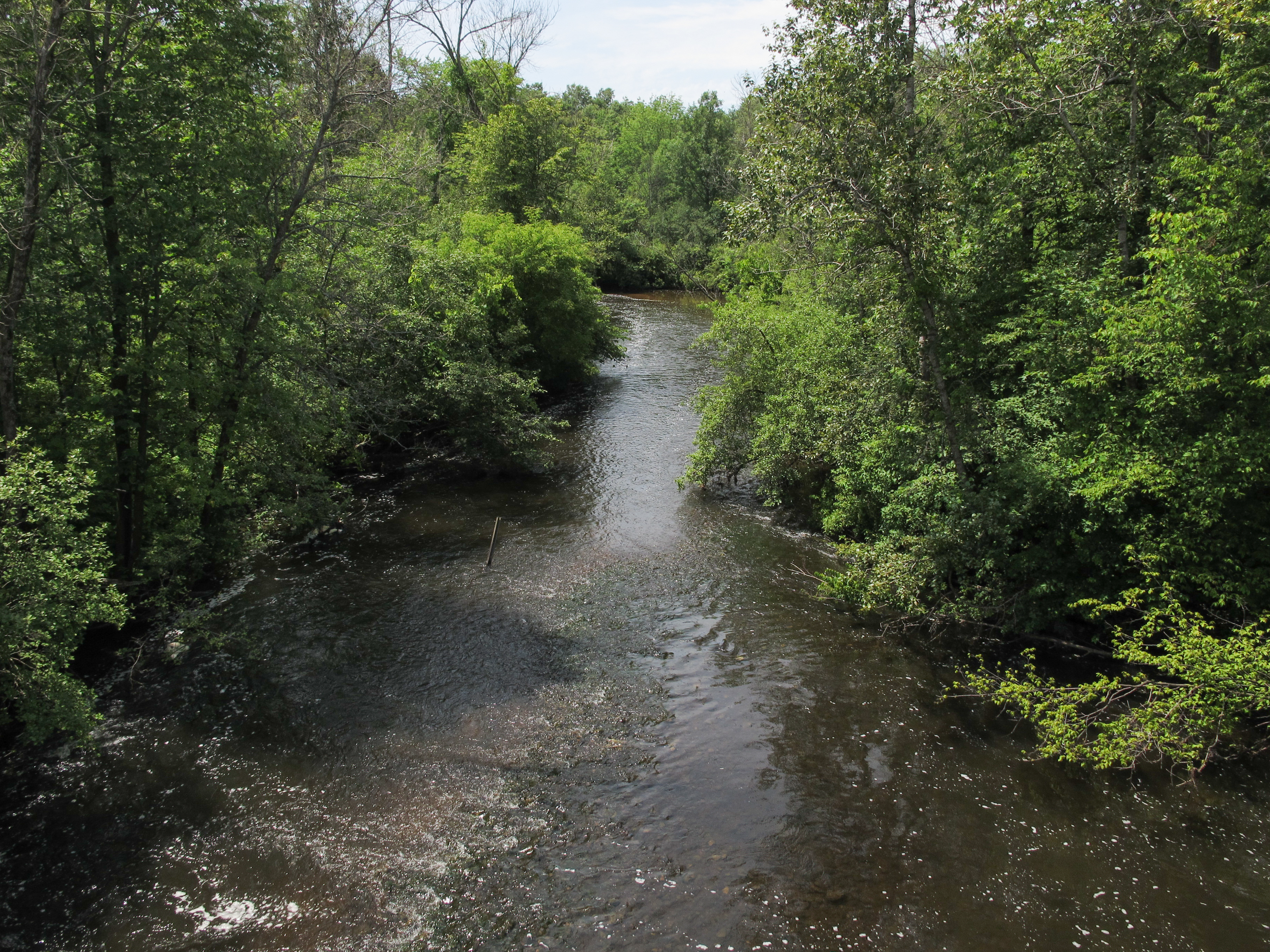
- The Little Muskegon River as viewed from the White Pine Trail in Morley

Location
- Country: United States

Physical characteristics
- Source
  - location: Michigan
- Mouth
  - location: Muskegon River

The Little Muskegon River is a 44.1-mile-long (71.0 km) tributary of the Muskegon River in western Michigan in the United States. Flowing primarily through the Huron-Manistee National Forest. The river supports a diverse assortment of fish such as smallmouth bass, trout, walleye, and catfish. Due to its moderate current it is also suitable for different paddling.

== See also ==
- List of rivers of Michigan
